= USS Barb =

Three submarines of the United States Navy have been named USS Barb, named after the fish, may refer to:

- USS Barb (SS-220), a Gato-class submarine in commission from 1942 to 1947, from 1951 to February 1954, and from August to December 1954
- USS Barb (SSN-596), a Permit-class submarine in commission from 1963 to 1989
- USS Barb (SSN-804), a planned Virginia-class submarine
