= USS Barb (SSGN-804) =

US Navy Virginia-class submarine

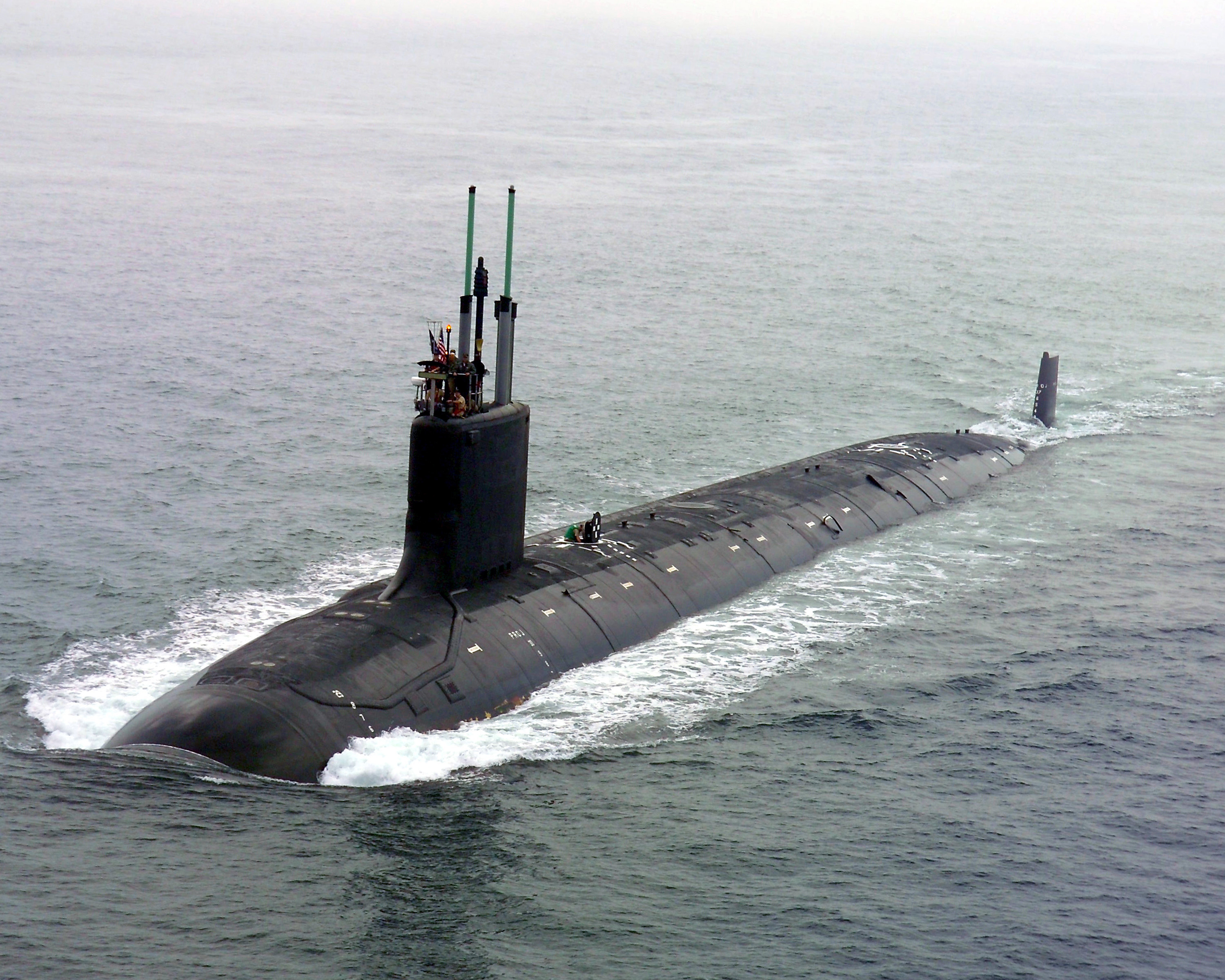
- The lead boat of the Virginia class, USS Virginia (SSN-774).

History

United States
- Name: USS Barb
- Namesake: Barb
- Ordered: 2 December 2019
- Builder: Newport News Shipbuilding
- Laid down: 9 December 2025
- Status: Under construction

General characteristics
- Class & type: Virginia-class submarine
- Displacement: 10,200 tons
- Length: 460 ft (140 m)
- Beam: 34 ft (10.4 m)
- Draft: 32 ft (9.8 m)
- Propulsion: S9G reactor auxiliary diesel engine
- Speed: 25 knots (46 km/h)
- Endurance: can remain submerged for up to 3 months
- Test depth: greater than 800 ft (244 m)
- Complement: 15 officers; 120 enlisted men
- Armament: 40 VLS tubes, four 21 inch (530 mm) torpedo tubes for Mk-48 torpedoes BGM-109 Tomahawk

USS Barb (SSGN-804) will be a Block 5 Virginia-class submarine nuclear powered attack submarine of the United States Navy. She will be the third United States Navy vessel named for the barb fish. She will also be the first Virginia-class submarine to be named after an aquatic animal and the first US Navy submarine to be named after an aquatic animal in more than 30 years. Secretary of the Navy Kenneth Braithwaite officially announced the name on 13 October 2020, in a ceremony unveiling plans to construct a new National Museum of the United States Navy in Washington, D.C. This particular variation from the naming convention is in reference to the World War II era submarine USS Barb (SS-220), which achieved one of the most outstanding combat records in US Navy history, specifically under the command of Commander Eugene B. Fluckey who was awarded the Medal of Honor while Barb received the Presidential Unit Citation. However this Barb will also carry the legacy of the 2nd Barb SSN-596, best remembered for rescuing a B-52 crew Colbalt-2 in July of 1972 (downed in Typhoon Rita (1972)), and test platform for BGM-109 Tomahawk.

== Design ==
Compared to Blocks I-IV of Virginia-class submarines, Block V vessels will incorporate previously introduced modifications to the base design in addition to a Virginia Payload Module (VPM). The VPM inserts a segment into the boat's hull which adds four vertical launch tubes. Each tube allows for the carrying of seven Tomahawk strike missiles, increasing her armament to a total of 40 missiles.

As August 3, 2026 all Block V Virginia-class SSNs from 803 onward, configured with the VPM, are considered as fast attack boats but very much capable of working as true guided missile submarine. Thus submarines from USS Arizona on have been redesignated as SSGNs, and USS Barb is now SSGN-804.
