= USS Pintado (SSN-672) =

United States submarine

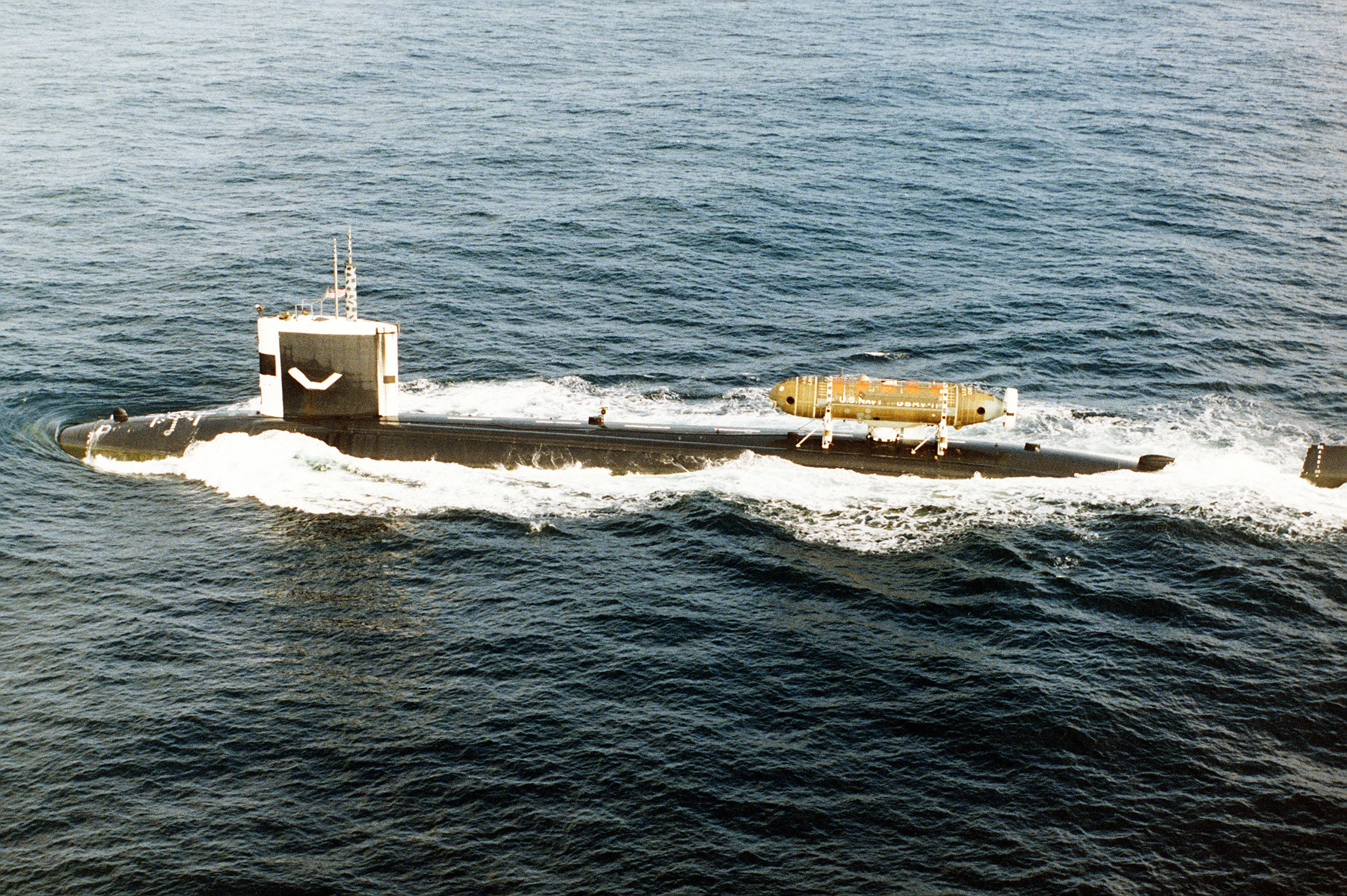
- USS Pintado (SSN-672) off San Diego, California, on 28 March 1977, with the Deep Submergence Rescue Vehicle DSRV-1 Mystic mounted behind her sail.

History

United States
- Name: Pintado
- Namesake: The pintado, a large mackerel-like fish
- Awarded: 29 December 1965
- Builder: Mare Island Naval Shipyard, Vallejo, California
- Laid down: 27 October 1967
- Launched: 16 August 1969
- Sponsored by: Mrs. Bernard A. Clarey
- Commissioned: 11 September 1971
- Decommissioned: 26 February 1998
- Stricken: 26 February 1998
- Identification: Hull symbol: SSN-672; Call sign: NKMZ
- Motto: Al Mas Pintado; (To the most able, to the wisest)
- Honors and awards: Navy Unit Commendation (1981)
- Fate: Scrapping via Ship and Submarine Recycling Program, completed 27 October 1998
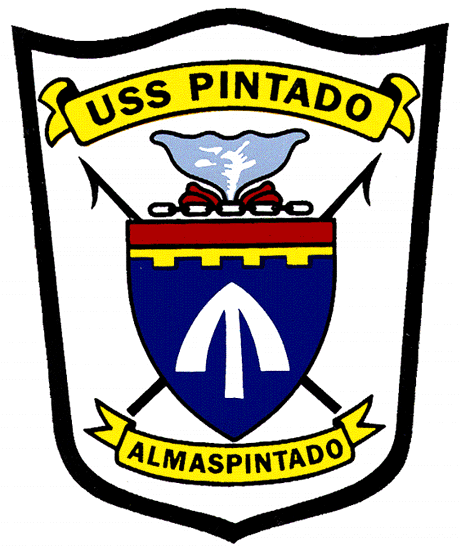
- Badge

General characteristics
- Class & type: Sturgeon-class attack submarine
- Displacement: 4,250 long tons (4,318 t) surfaced; 4,780 long tons (4,857 t) submerged
- Length: 292 ft 3 in (89.08 m)
- Beam: 31 ft 8 in (9.65 m)
- Draft: 28 ft 8 in (8.74 m)
- Installed power: 15,000 shp (11,000 kW)
- Propulsion: 1 × S5W nuclear reactor; 2 × steam turbines; 1 × screw
- Speed: 15 knots (28 km/h; 17 mph) surfaced; 25 knots (46 km/h; 29 mph) submerged
- Test depth: 1,300 ft (400 m)
- Complement: 109 (14 officers, 95 enlisted personnel )
- Armament: 4 × 21-inch (533 mm) torpedo tubes, MK 48 torpedo; UUM-44 SUBROC; UGM-84A/C Harpoon; Mk 60 Deep water mine

USS Pintado (SSN-672), a short hull Sturgeon-class attack submarine, was the second ship of the United States Navy to be named for the pintado, a large mackerel-like fish, whose elongated spots suggested the Spanish language word meaning "painted."

== Construction and commissioning ==
The contract to build Pintado was awarded to Mare Island Naval Shipyard, at Vallejo, California, on 29 December 1965, and her keel was laid down there on 27 October 1967. She was launched on 16 August 1969, sponsored by Mrs. Bernard A. Clarey, the wife of the Vice Chief of Naval Operations, Admiral Bernard A. "Chick" Clarey (1912–1996), and commissioned on 11 September 1971.

== Service history ==
Pintado was assigned San Diego, California, as her home port. She commenced her first operational deployment to the United States Seventh Fleet in the Western Pacific in November 1972, returning to San Diego, in February 1973. Pintado conducted her second operational deployment from April to September 1974.

In May 1974 Pintado collided with a Soviet Navy YANKEE class ballistic missile submarine in the approaches to the Petropavlovsk-Kamchatsky naval base on the Soviet Union's Kamchatka Peninsula. The collision smashed much of Pintado's sonar sphere, jammed one of her a starboard-side torpedo hatches shut, and moderately damaging one of her diving planes. The commanding officer, then-Commander J. Guy Reynolds, later retired as a vice admiral. The Soviet submarine surfaced immediately, but the extent of damage to her was not known. Pintado, meanwhile, remained submerged and departed the area at top speed. She proceeded to Guam, where she entered drydock for repairs that lasted seven weeks.

From end October 1974 to September 1975, Pintado conducted routine training operations in the San Diego area. In March 1975, Pintado became the first submarine to successfully launch the Harpoon missile. In August 1975,Pintado changed homeport to Bremerton, Washington, where she underwent upgrades and repairs at Puget Sound Naval Shipyard. Finishing the yard period early, Pintado returned to San Diego, in June 1976, and resumed routine training operations in the San Diego area.

Following her year of routine training, Pintado deployed to the Western Pacific in August 1977. She was operating with Republic of Korea Navy vessels on 6 December 1977, when a South Korean surface ship abruptly turned toward her. She executed a crash dive, but the two ships collided, and Pintado sustained damage to the top of her rudder. She returned to San Diego in February 1978.

From February to September 1978, Pintado conducted local training operations in the San Diego area.

From September to December 1978, Pintado operated in the Arctic under the polar ice cap, surfacing at the North Pole on 10 October 1978.

In September 1979, Pintado deployed to the Indian Ocean and supported Carrier battle groups Alpha and Bravo during the early weeks of the Iranian hostage crisis. She returned to San Diego, in January 1980.

Pintado again deployed to the Western Pacific from February to August 1981, earning a Navy Unit Commendation.

In June 1982, Pintado entered Pearl Harbor Naval Shipyard, at Pearl Harbor, Hawaii, for a 16-month regular overhaul and refueling, during which her combat systems were extensively upgraded. The overhaul was completed in December 1983, and in December 1983 she resumed operations out of San Diego.

Pintado returned to the Arctic Ocean in September 1984, operating under the polar ice cap until December 1984, in company with one of her sister ships, the attack submarine Gurnard. On 12 November 1984, Pintado and Gurnard became the third pair of submarines to surface together at the North Pole.

From July 1985 to January 1986, Pintado conducted her fifth operational deployment to the United States Seventh Fleet, in the Western Pacific. During this deployment, Pintado steamed over 33,000 nmi (61,000 km; 38,000 mi) and conducted numerous fast-paced and highly successful operations. Following her return to San Diego, she completed repairs and alteration and celebrated the 15th anniversary of her commissioning. During the autumn of 1986, Pintado conducted over 50 days of highly successful operations as the Commander, Submarine Force, Pacific ready nuclear-powered attack submarine.

Pintado surfaced at the North Pole, for the third time on 16 June 1987, during arduous Arctic operations extending from January to June 1987.

In January 1990 Pintado entered Mare Island Naval Shipyard, for a regular overhaul and refueling.

In January 1992, Pintado's home port was changed to Pearl Harbor and became a member of Submarine Squadron 1.

From August 1992 through October 1992, Pintado conducted her fourth Arctic operation, also marking her 1000th surfacing and dive on 23 August 1992. She surfaced at the North Pole for an unprecedented fourth time on 4 September 1992, and returned to Pearl Harbor, in November 1992, after circumnavigating North America, and steaming over 20,000 nmi (37,000 km; 23,000 mi).

In July 1993, Pintado made a six-month UNITAS deployment in company with several U.S. Navy surface units, circumnavigating South America while visiting numerous ports and working extensively in exercises with various South American navies.

From February 1996 through August 1996, Pintado conducted her sixth and final deployment to the Western Pacific. During this deployment Pintado participated in several exercises with the Japanese Maritime Self-Defense Force and the Republic of Korea Navy.

== Decommissioning and disposal ==
Pintado was decommissioned on 26 February 1998, and stricken from the Naval Vessel Register the same day. Her scrapping via the Nuclear-Powered Ship and Submarine Recycling Program at Puget Sound Naval Shipyard, in Bremerton, was completed on 27 October 1998.

== Bibliography ==
- Pike, John (28 November 1999). "SSN-637 Sturgeon class".
- "Pintado II (SS(N)-672)". Naval History and Heritage Command. 21 August 2015. This article incorporates text from this source, which is in the public domain.
- "USS Pintado (SSN-672)". NavSource.
- "J. Guy Reynolds". legacy.com.
- "U.S.S. PINTADO (SSN-672)".
