= Vermo (disambiguation) =

Vermo may refer to:

- Vermo, a harness racing track in Finland
- Vermo (village), Italian name for the village of Beram in Istria
- VERMO, the EPPO code of Veronica montana

== See also ==
- Vermont (disambiguation) (French pronunciation: [vɛʁmɔ̃])
