= James Kowalski =

United States Air Force general

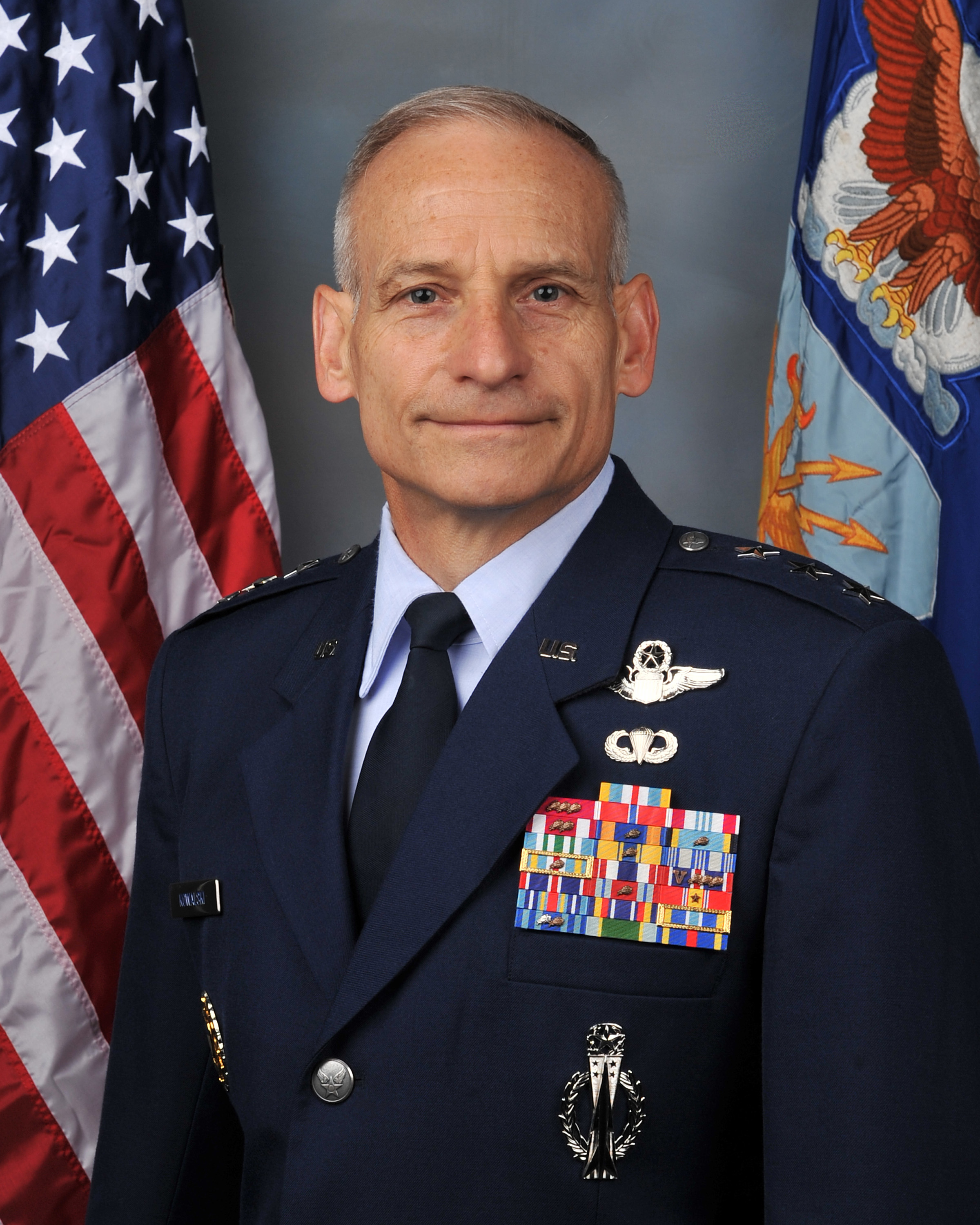
- Born: October 30, 1957 (age 68); Columbus, Ohio
- Military career
- Allegiance: United States
- Branch: United States Air Force
- Service years: 1980–2015
- Rank: Lieutenant General
- Commands: Air Force Global Strike Command; 28th Bomb Squadron; 2d Operations Group; 28th Bomb Wing; 552nd Air Control Wing
- Awards: Defense Distinguished Service Medal; Air Force Distinguished Service Medal; Defense Superior Service Medal; Legion of Merit (4); Bronze Star Medal

James M. Kowalski (born October 30, 1957) is a retired United States Air Force lieutenant general who served as the Deputy Commander, United States Strategic Command from 2013 to 2015.

== Military career ==
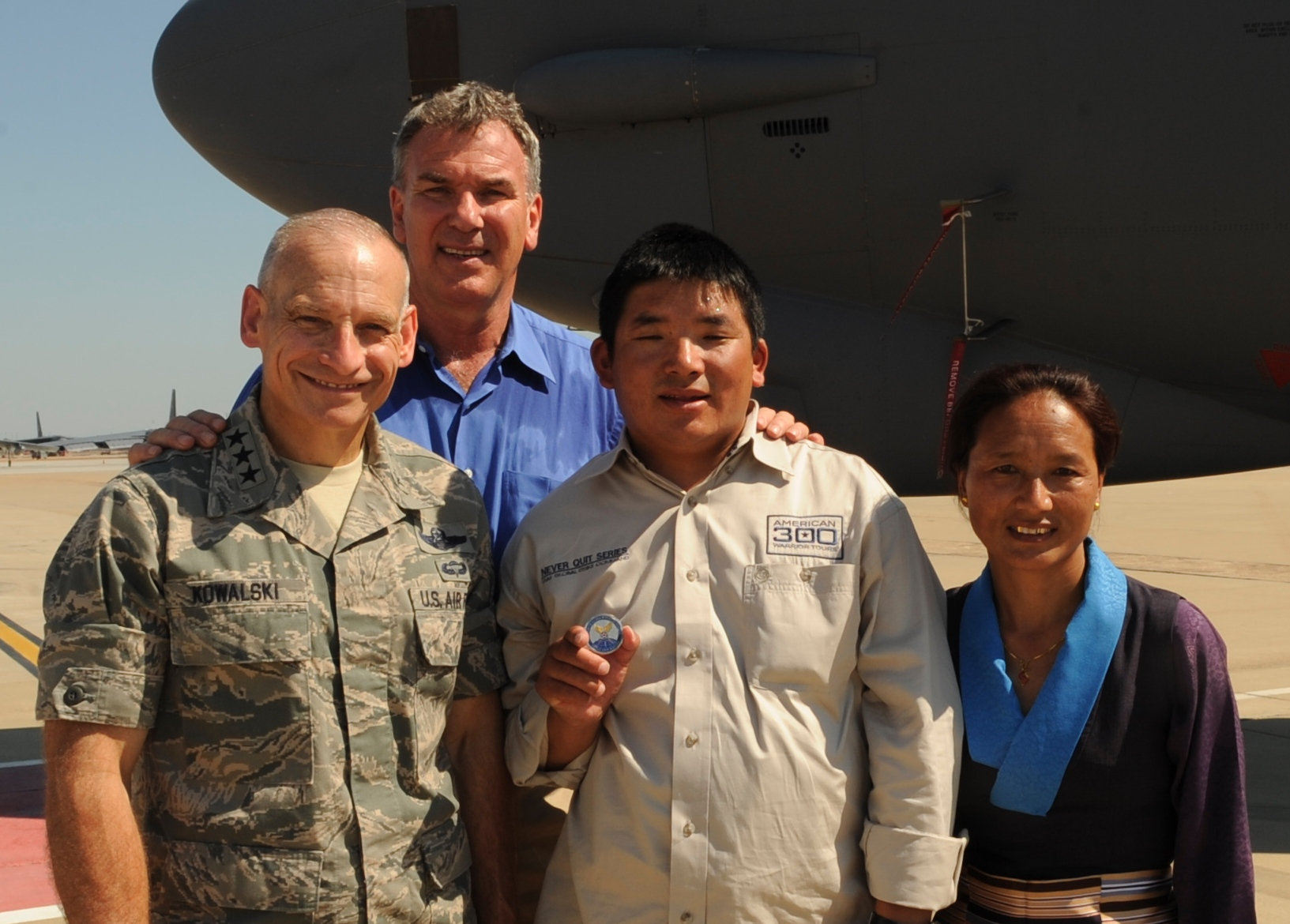
Kowalski, Tom Whittaker, Chhiring Dorje Sherpa and Dawa Yangzum Sherpa

Kowalski entered active duty in 1980 through the ROTC program at the University of Cincinnati. He held a variety of operational commands, including a bomb squadron, an operations group, a bomb wing and an air control wing over his 35-year career. Kowalski retired from active duty on 1 September 2015.

Kowalski's contingency and wartime experience include command of the 2nd Operations Group when the unit deployed B-52s for combat during operations Noble Anvil and Allied Force, and command of the 28th Bomb Wing when it deployed B-1Bs for Operation Iraqi Freedom. From January 2003 to May 2003, Kowalski commanded the 405th Air Expeditionary Wing in Southwest Asia where he led a combined wing of B-1Bs, E-3s and KC-135s to provide strike, battle management, and air refueling for operations Iraqi Freedom, Enduring Freedom and Southern Watch. His previous staff assignments include Headquarters Air Combat Command, Headquarters U.S. Air Force and the Joint Chiefs of Staff. He served as Commander, Air Force Global Strike Command until October 2013, when he became Deputy Commander of U.S. Strategic Command. He retired on September 1, 2015.

== Awards and decorations ==
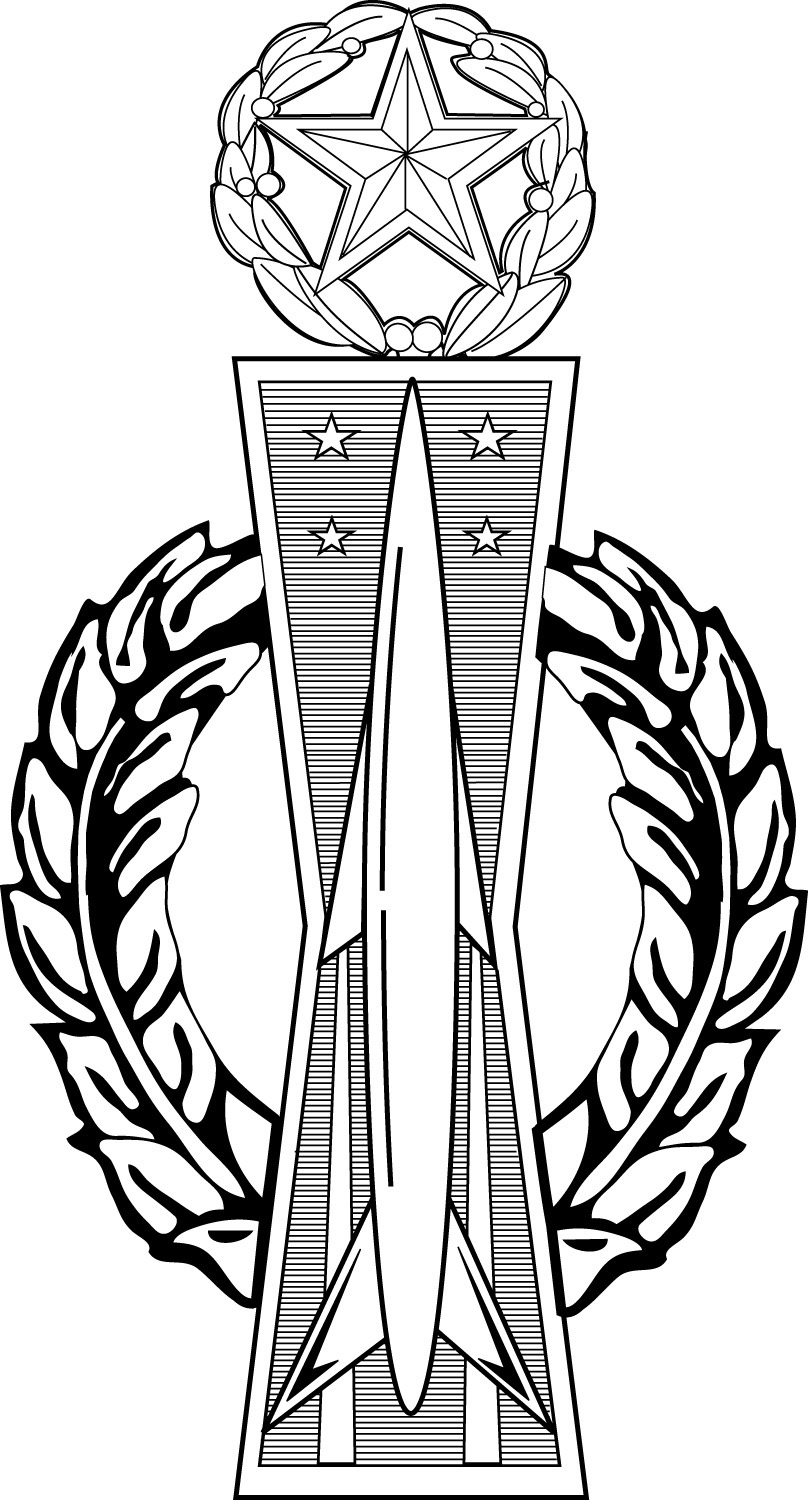
US Air Force Command Pilot Badge
Basic Parachutist Badge
Master Missile Operations Badge
Office of the Joint Chiefs of Staff Identification Badge

Defense Distinguished Service Medal
Air Force Distinguished Service Medal
Defense Superior Service Medal
Legion of Merit with three bronze oak leaf clusters
Bronze Star Medal
Defense Meritorious Service Medal
Meritorious Service Medal with two oak leaf clusters
Air Medal with oak leaf cluster
Aerial Achievement Medal with oak leaf cluster
Joint Service Commendation Medal
Air Force Commendation Medal with oak leaf cluster
Air Force Achievement Medal
Joint Meritorious Unit Award with oak leaf cluster
Air Force Meritorious Unit Award
Air Force Outstanding Unit Award with Valor device and three bronze oak leaf clusters
Air Force Outstanding Unit Award (second ribbon to denote fifth award)
Combat Readiness Medal with oak leaf cluster
National Defense Service Medal with one bronze service star
Global War on Terrorism Expeditionary Medal
Global War on Terrorism Service Medal
Nuclear Deterrence Operations Service Medal
Air Force Expeditionary Service Ribbon with gold frame
Air Force Longevity Service Award with one silver and two bronze oak leaf clusters
Small Arms Expert Marksmanship Ribbon
Air Force Training Ribbon

== Dates of promotion ==
Insignia	Rank	Date
	Lieutenant general	Jan. 6, 2011
	Major general	May 7, 2009
	Brigadier general	Nov. 1, 2005
	Colonel	May 1, 1999
	Lieutenant colonel	Mar. 1, 1994
	Major	Jan. 1, 1990
	Captain	Mar. 14, 1983
	First lieutenant	Mar. 14, 1981
	Second lieutenant	Jun. 9, 1979

Military offices
New command	Commander, Air Force Global Strike Command (Provisional); 2009	Succeeded by Frank Klotz
Preceded by Frank Klotz	Commander of the Air Force Global Strike Command; 2011–2013	Succeeded by Stephen W. Wilson
Preceded by Timothy Giardina	Deputy Commander of the United States Strategic Command; 2013–2015	Succeeded by Stephen W. Wilson
