= USS Vermont (SSN-792) =

US Navy Virginia-class submarine

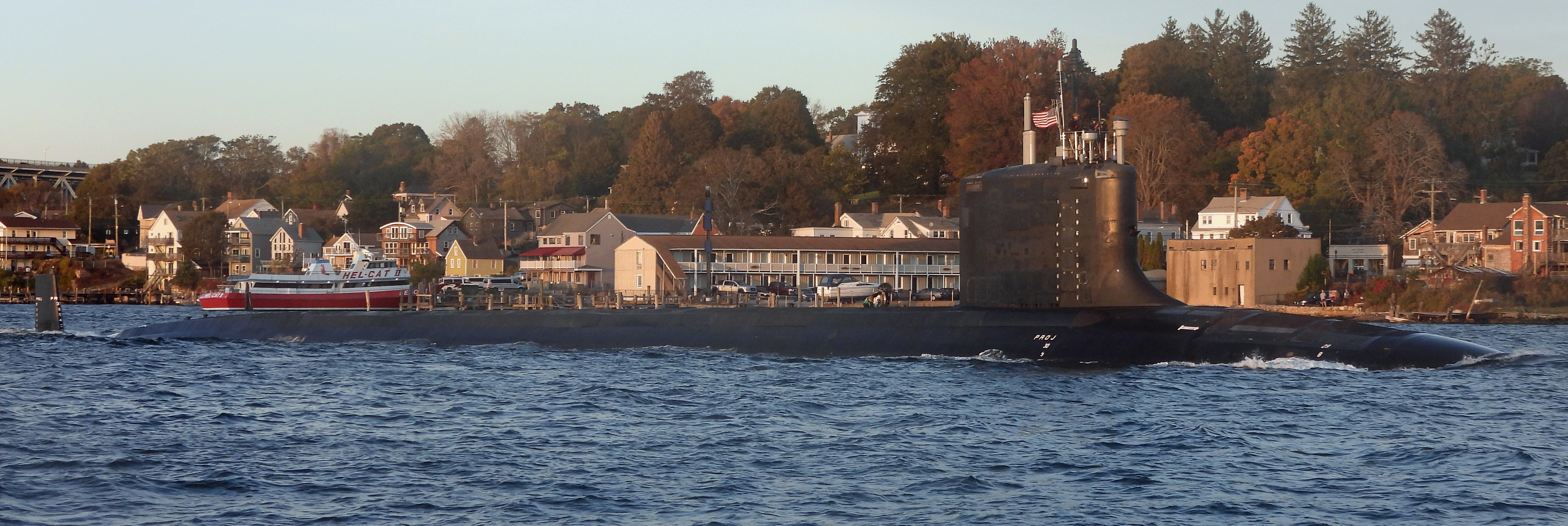
- USS Vermont, in October 2020

History

United States
- Name: USS Vermont
- Namesake: State of Vermont
- Ordered: 28 April 2014
- Builder: General Dynamics Electric Boat, Groton, Connecticut
- Laid down: February 2017
- Launched: 29 March 2019
- Sponsored by: Gloria L. Valdez
- Christened: 20 October 2018
- Acquired: 17 April 2020
- Commissioned: 18 April 2020
- Home port: Pearl Harbor, HI
- Identification: Hull symbol:SSN-792
- Status: In active service

General characteristics
- Class & type: Virginia-class submarine
- Displacement: 7,800 tons
- Length: 377 ft (115 m)
- Beam: 34 ft (10.4 m)
- Draft: 32 ft (9.8 m)
- Propulsion: 1 × S9G PWR nuclear reactor 280,000 shp (210 MW), HEU 93%; 2 × steam turbines 40,000 shp (30 MW); 1 × single shaft pump-jet propulsor; 1 × secondary propulsion motor
- Speed: 25 knots (46 km/h)
- Endurance: can remain submerged indefinitely dependent on food stores and maintenance requirements.
- Test depth: greater than 800 ft (244 m)
- Complement: 15 officers; 120 enlisted
- Armament: 12 VLS tubes, four 21 inch (530 mm) torpedo tubes for Mk-48 torpedoes BGM-109 Tomahawk

USS Vermont (SSN-792) is a Virginia-class nuclear powered attack submarine in the United States Navy. She is the 19th boat of the class and the third vessel of the Navy to be named for the U.S. state of Vermont. Then Secretary of the Navy, Ray Mabus, announced her name on 18 September 2014.

Vermont, the first of the Block IV type, was part of a construction contract, worth US$17.6 billion, awarded to General Dynamics Electric Boat to build ten Virginia-class submarines.

On 20 October 2018, Vermont was christened with a bottle of Vermont sparkling apple wine during a ceremony held at the Electric Boat facility in Groton, Connecticut. She was delivered to the Navy on 17 April 2020, and commissioned on 18 April 2020.

On July 27, 2023, Vermont arrived in her new home port of Pearl Harbor, HI. The submarine is assigned under Submarine Squadron ONE.

== Service history ==
In December 2020, Vermont sailed to Brazil to attend the launch of Brazilian Navy submarine Humaitá and perform an exercise with submarine Tupi
