= Cecil D. Haney =

United States Navy admiral

Admiral Cecil D. Haney
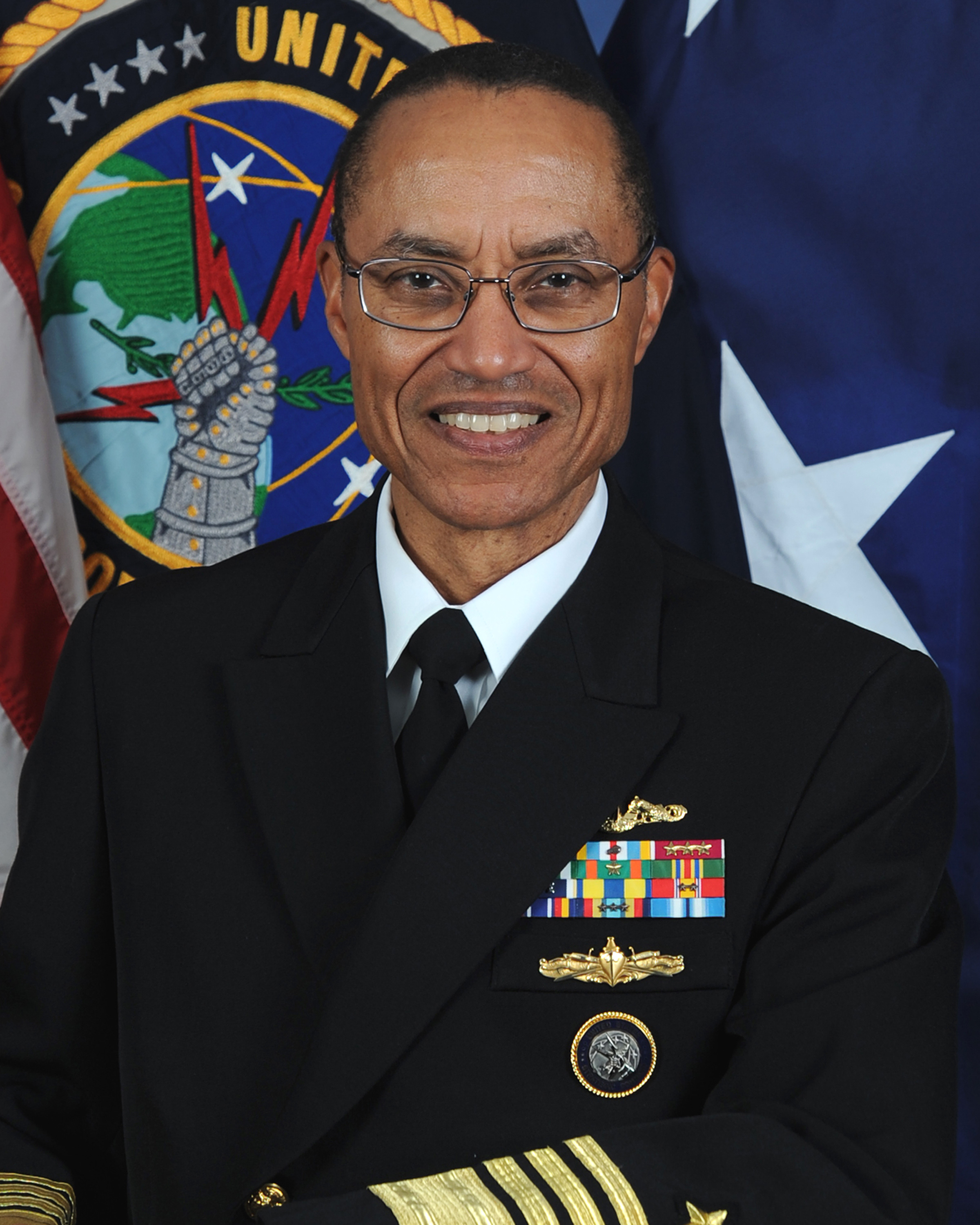
- Admiral Cecil D. Haney
- Born: December 1, 1955 (age 70); Washington, D.C., United States
- Military career
- Allegiance: United States of America
- Branch: United States Navy
- Service years: 1978—2017
- Rank: Admiral
- Commands: United States Strategic Command; United States Pacific Fleet; Submarine Group 2 Submarine Squadron 1 USS Honolulu
- Conflicts: War on terror
- Awards: Defense Distinguished Service Medal; Navy Distinguished Service Medal (2); Defense Superior Service Medal (2); Legion of Merit (4)

Cecil Eugene Diggs Haney (born December 1, 1955) is a retired United States Navy admiral who served as Commander, United States Strategic Command (STRATCOM) from November 15, 2013 to November 3, 2016. Prior to STRATCOM, he served as Commander, United States Pacific Fleet. He received the Defense Distinguished Service Medal, the Navy Distinguished Service Medal, the Defense Superior Service Medal, and the Legion of Merit.

== Early life and education ==
Haney was born and raised in Washington, D.C., graduating from the United States Naval Academy in 1978, where he received a Bachelor of Science degree in Ocean Engineering. He holds master's degrees in Engineering Acoustics and System Technology from the Naval Postgraduate School, and a master's degree in National Security Strategy from the National Defense University.

== Naval career ==
Speaking during an All Hands call.

Haney completed operational assignments in USS John C. Calhoun in various division officer assignments and in USS Frank Cable, where he completed surface warfare qualifications while serving as radiological controls officer. He served as engineer in USS Hyman G. Rickover, executive officer in USS Asheville, and assistant squadron deputy at Submarine Squadron 8 before taking command of USS Honolulu in June 1996. Haney commanded Submarine Squadron 1 from June 2002 to July 2004, and Submarine Group 2 from October 2006 to March 2008.

Haney's shore duty tours include administrative assistant for enlisted affairs at Naval Reactors, and congressional appropriations liaison officer for the Office of the Secretary of Defense (Comptroller); Deputy Chief of Staff of Plans, Policies and Requirements, U.S. Pacific Fleet (N5N8); and director, Submarine Warfare Division (N87); director, Naval Warfare Integration Group (N00X) and deputy commander, U.S. Strategic Command, Offutt Air Force Base, Nebraska.

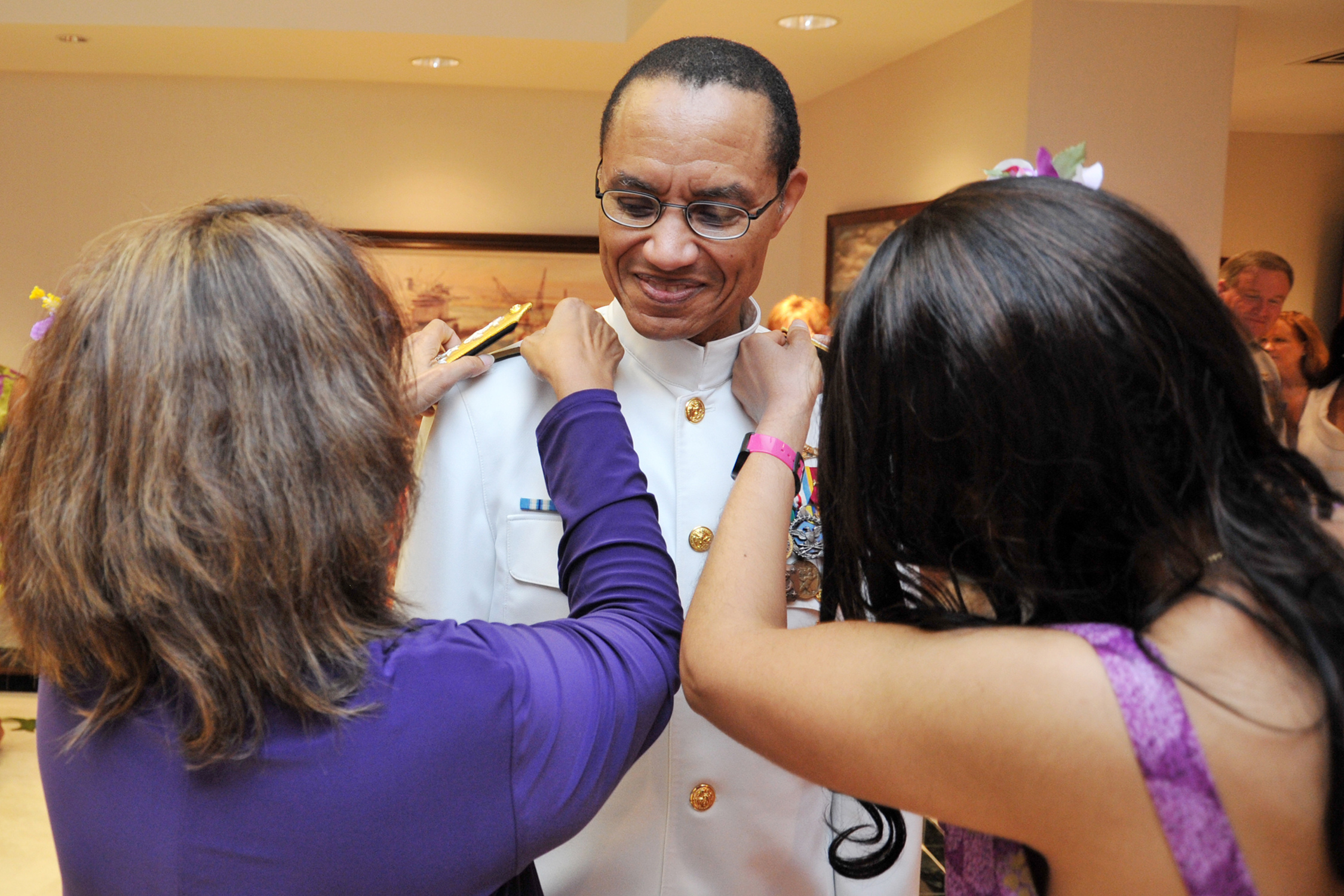
His family pinning his new shoulder boards

Haney assumed his assignment as Commander, United States Pacific Fleet on January 20, 2012.

Haney relinquished command of the United States Strategic Command on November 3, 2016 to General John E. Hyten.

== Retirement ==
Haney serves on the Johns Hopkins University Applied Physics Laboratory Board of Managers and the Pennsylvania State University Applied Research Laboratory advisory board. On March 6, 2019, General Dynamics elected Haney as a member of its board of directors.

== Awards and decorations ==
Submarine Warfare insignia
Surface Warfare Officer badge
United States Strategic Command Badge

Defense Distinguished Service Medal
Navy Distinguished Service Medal (with gold award star)
Defense Superior Service Medal (with one bronze oak leaf cluster)
Legion of Merit (with three gold award stars)
Navy Commendation Medal (with two gold award stars)
Navy Achievement Medal (with one gold award star)
Joint Meritorious Unit Award
Navy Meritorious Unit Commendation
Navy "E" Ribbon (with two Battle E devices)
Navy Expeditionary Medal
National Defense Service Medal (with two bronze service stars)
Global War on Terrorism Service Medal
Navy Sea Service Deployment Ribbon (with three bronze service stars)
Navy Arctic Service Ribbon

Haney was the 1998 Vice Admiral James Bond Stockdale Award for Inspirational Leadership recipient for the Pacific fleet.

Military offices
Preceded by Carl V. Mauney	Deputy Commander of the United States Strategic Command; 2010–2011	Succeeded by Timothy Giardina
Preceded by Patrick M. Walsh	Commander, United States Pacific Fleet; 2012–2013	Succeeded by Harry B. Harris Jr.
Preceded by C. Robert Kehler	Commander, United States Strategic Command; 2013–2016	Succeeded by John E. Hyten
