= Timothy Giardina =

Timothy M. Giardina
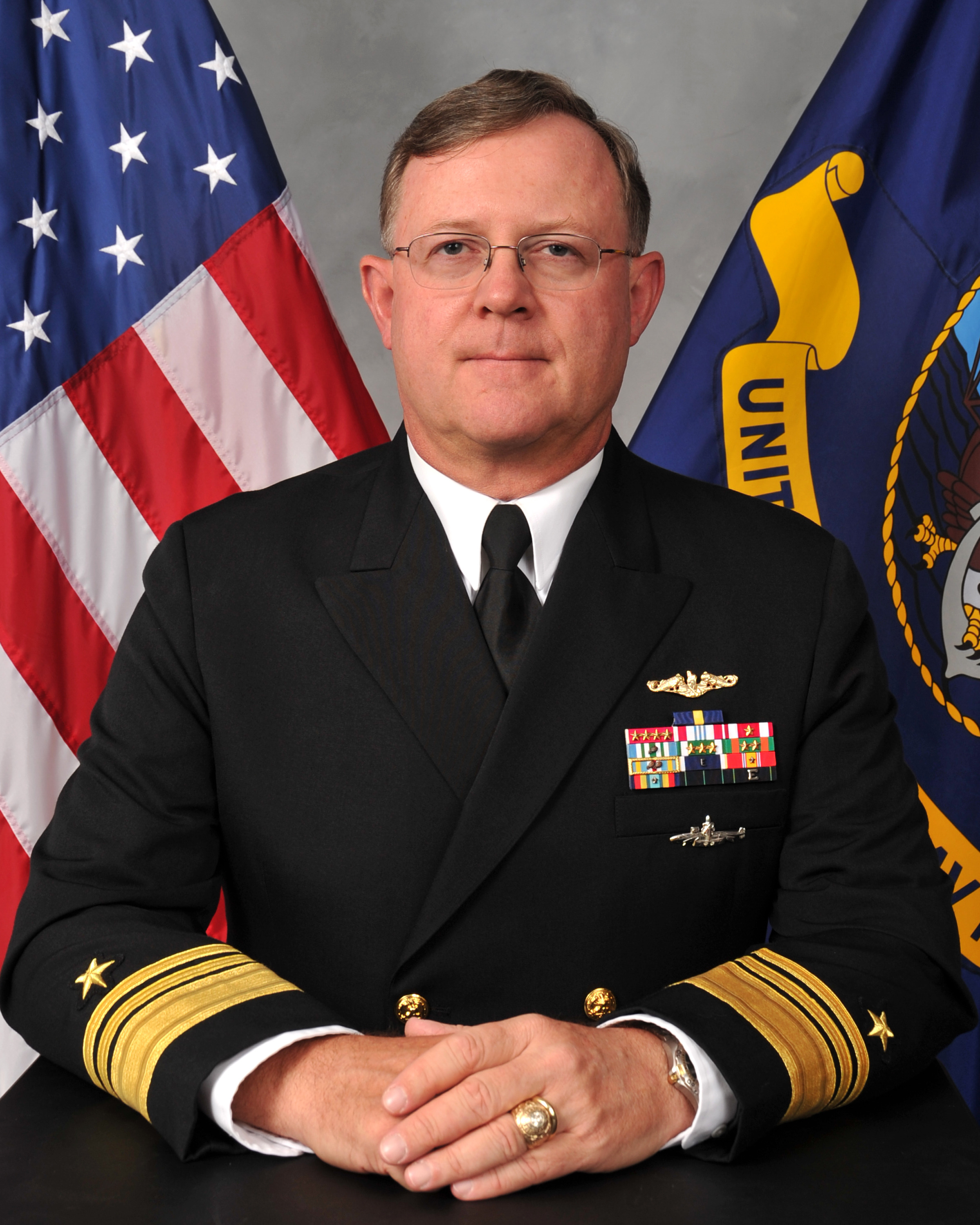
- Giardina in 2011
- Born: 1957 or 1958 (age 68–69)
- Military career
- Allegiance: United States
- Branch: United States Navy
- Service years: 1979–2015
- Rank: Rear Admiral
- Commands: Submarine Group 9; Submarine Group 10; Submarine Squadron 17; USS Kentucky
- Awards: Navy Distinguished Service Medal; Legion of Merit (6); Meritorious Service Medal (2); Navy and Marine Corps Commendation Medal (3); Navy Achievement Medal (4)

Timothy Michael "Tim" Giardina (born 1957) is a retired United States Navy officer and formerly the deputy commander of U.S. nuclear forces. In May 2014, all charges associated with counterfeiting were dropped by the Navy, but he was fined and reprimanded for two specifications of conduct unbecoming an officer and gentleman. The specifications included 1) not reporting exactly what valuables he found in a casino bathroom when he initially reported finding valuables to casino management and 2) lying to an Iowa investigator in the casino when questioned about the incident. As a result of being suspended pending resolution of the ongoing investigation, Giardina reverted to the rank of rear admiral

== Navy career ==
Giardina graduated from the United States Naval Academy in 1979 with a Bachelor of Science degree in mathematics.

== Counterfeit poker chips ==
In June 2013, Giardina was caught using three counterfeit gambling chips in a Council Bluffs, Iowa, casino. Giardina was investigated by the Navy and suspended from duty in September 2013. Later investigation revealed that someone had altered several $1 chips into $500 chips with adhesive tape and paint. It was further alleged that Giardina would spend approximately 15 hours a week on occasion playing poker. In May 2014, he was found guilty of two counts of "conduct unbecoming an officer and a gentleman." He reverted from vice admiral to rear admiral, was removed from his position as deputy commander at Strategic Command, and was given a staff officer position in Washington, D.C.

== Guilty plea for obstruction of justice ==
In 2025, Giardina pled guilty to obstruction of justice after he gave false testimony for a tenant of his during a bail bond proceeding.

Military offices
Preceded by Cecil D. Haney	Deputy Commander of the United States Strategic Command; 2011–2013	Succeeded by James Kowalski
