= USS Illinois (SSN-786) =

US Navy Virginia-class submarine

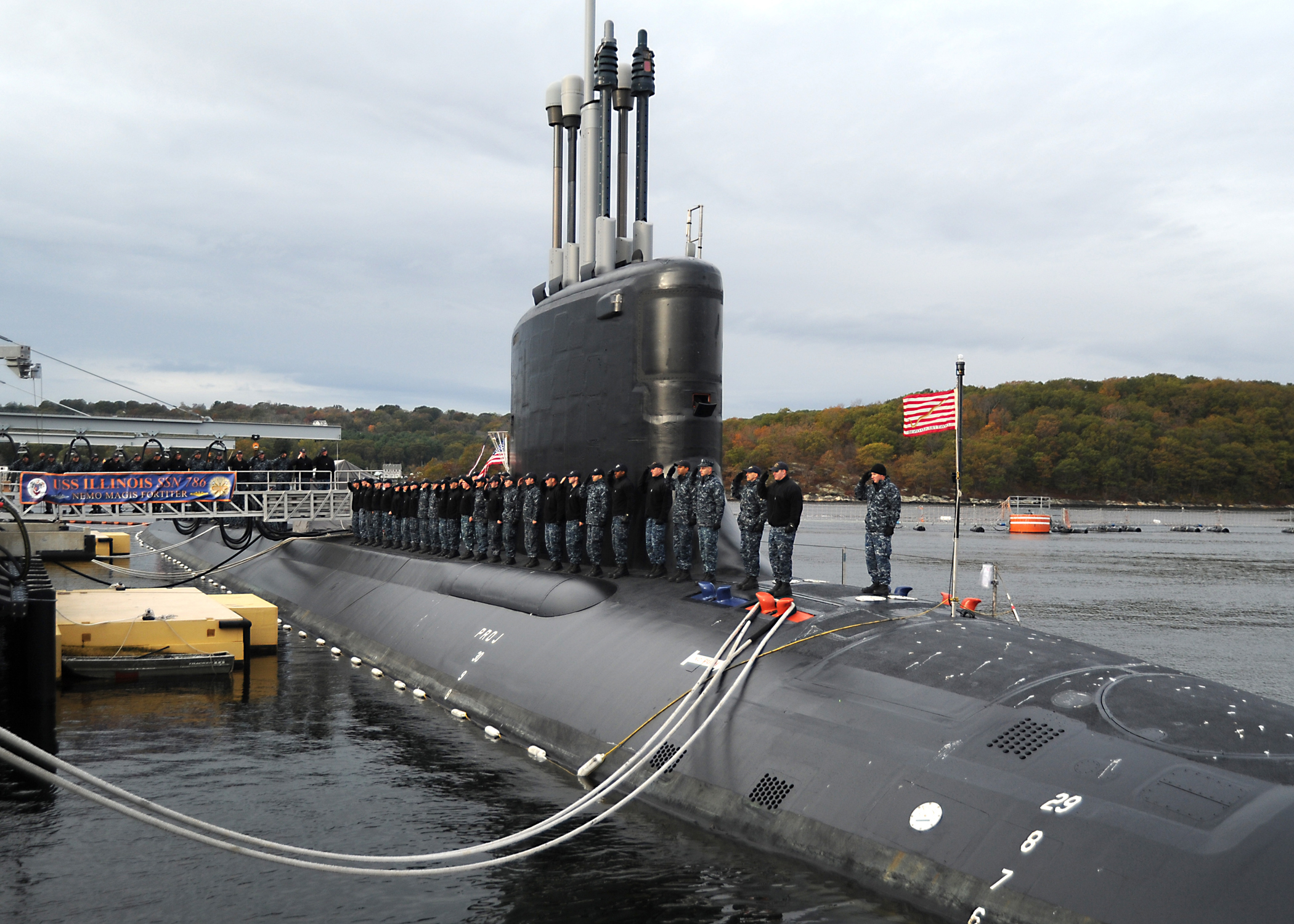
- Illinois on 27 August 2016

History

United States
- Name: USS Illinois
- Namesake: State of Illinois
- Awarded: 22 December 2008
- Builder: Electric Boat
- Laid down: 2 June 2014
- Launched: 8 August 2015
- Sponsored by: Michelle Obama
- Christened: 10 October 2015
- Acquired: 27 August 2016
- Commissioned: 29 October 2016
- Home port: Pearl Harbor, Hawaii
- Motto: Nemo Magis Fortiter ("None more brave")
- Status: Active service
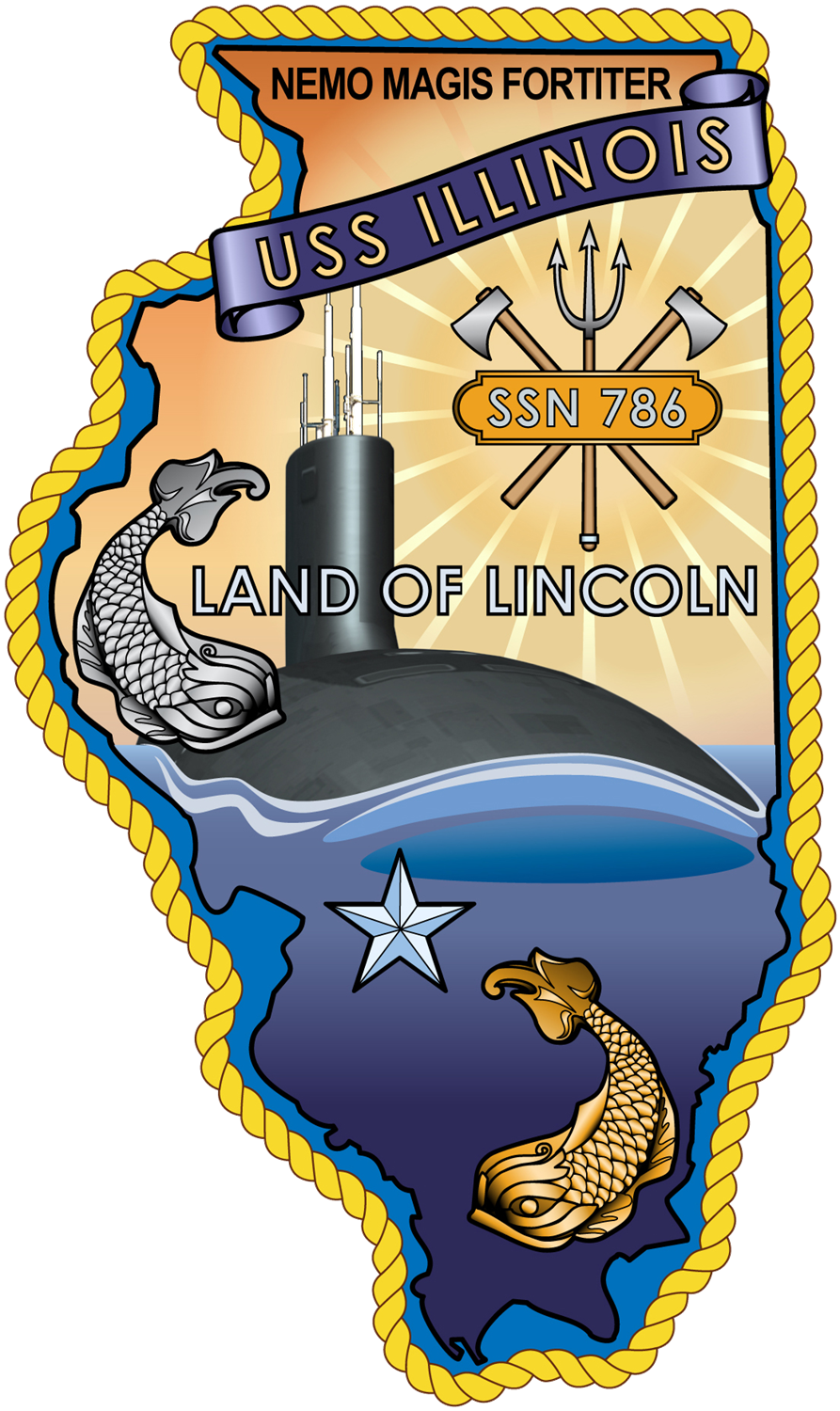
- Badge

General characteristics
- Class & type: Virginia-class submarine
- Displacement: 7,800 tons light; 7,800 tons full
- Length: 114.9 meters (377 feet)
- Beam: 10.3 meters (34 feet)
- Draft: 9.8 meters (32 feet)
- Propulsion: 1 × S9G PWR nuclear reactor 280,000 shp (210 MW), HEU 93%; 2 × steam turbines 40,000 shp (30 MW); 1 × single shaft pump-jet propulsor; 1 × secondary propulsion motor
- Speed: 25 knots (46 km/h)
- Range: Essentially unlimited distance; 33 years
- Complement: 134 officers and sailors

USS Illinois (SSN-786) is a Virginia-class nuclear-powered attack submarine in the United States Navy. Named for the State of Illinois, she is the third vessel with the name, the previous two being battleships BB-7 and BB-65, which was never completed. She was built by the Electric Boat division of General Dynamics, the third of their Block III variants which feature a revised bow and technology from the converted sub-class of Ohio guided missile submarines (SSGN). The contract for the build was awarded on 22 December 2008 to Huntington Ingalls Industries in partnership with Electric Boat, and construction commenced with the keel laying ceremony on 2 June 2014, at their yard in Groton, Connecticut. First Lady Michelle Obama served as the ship's sponsor, and christened the boat on 10 October 2015. Illinois was launched on 8 August 2015 and completed sea trials on 2 August 2016. She was delivered to the Navy on 27 August 2016 and commissioned in a ceremony at Naval Submarine Base New London on 29 October 2016. Then-First Lady Michelle Obama, as the sponsor, attended the ceremony and is considered to be an honorary member of the crew due to her support of military families and her involvement with the Illinois crew and their families.

== History ==
Illinois completed a change of home port from Naval Submarine Base New London to Naval Base Pearl Harbor on 22 November 2017, where she is assigned to Submarine Squadron One.

== Ship's crest ==
The official ship's crest was designed by Christopher Durdle of Roseville, IL and accepted by the Navy at an unveiling ceremony at the Union League Club of Chicago on 2 April 2015. First Lady Michelle Obama congratulated the contest finalists and crew via video at the ceremony.

== Construction and commissioning ==
USS Illinois (SSN-786) was built by General Dynamics Electric Boat in Groton, Connecticut. Her keel was laid on 2 June 2014. She was christened on 10 October 2015, with First Lady Michelle Obama serving as sponsor, and was commissioned on 29 October 2016.
