= Vermont (disambiguation) =

Vermont is a state in the New England region of the northeastern United States.

Vermont also may refer to:

== Places ==
=== United States ===
- Vermont Republic, name later given to the government of Vermont from 1777 until admission as a state in 1791
- Vermont Township, Fulton County, Illinois
  - Vermont, Illinois, a village
- Vermont, Indiana, an unincorporated community
- Vermont, Wisconsin, a town
  - Vermont (community), Wisconsin, an unincorporated community
- Lake Vermont, a temporary lake in North America created at the close of the last ice age

=== Elsewhere ===
- Le Vermont, a commune in France
- Vermont, Victoria, a suburb of the Australian city of Melbourne
- Vermont, Western Cape, a town in South Africa
- Vermont, Saint Vincent and the Grenadines, a village

== Transportation ==
- Vermont (automobile), the first automobile to make a trip across North America
- Vermont, a ferry used by the Lake Champlain Transportation Company
- Vermont, the first steamboat on Lake Champlain, launched in 1808
- Vermont Railway, a major railroad carrier in Vermont
- Vermont Avenue, Los Angeles, California
- Vermont Street (San Francisco), California
- Vermont, a street in Sunderland, United Kingdom

== People ==
- Vermont Garrison (1915–1994), US Air Force officer and flying ace
- Vermont Hatch (1893–1959), American lawyer
- Vermont C. Royster (1914–1996), American journalist
- Nicolae Vermont (1866–1932), Romanian painter
- Pierre Vermont (c. 1495–1533), French composer

== Other uses ==
- University of Vermont, Burlington, Vermont, United States
  - Vermont Catamounts, the athletic program of the University of Vermont
- USS Vermont, several US Navy ships
- Vermont Building, Boston, Massachusetts, United States
- Vermont (band), an indie band composed of former members of The Promise Ring

== See also ==
- Hyacinthe Collin de Vermont (1693–1761), a French painter
- Vermonter (train), a daily Amtrak passenger train operating between St. Albans, Vermont and Washington, DC
- Verdmont, a historic house in Bermuda
