= USS Gurnard (SSN-662) =

Submarine of the United States

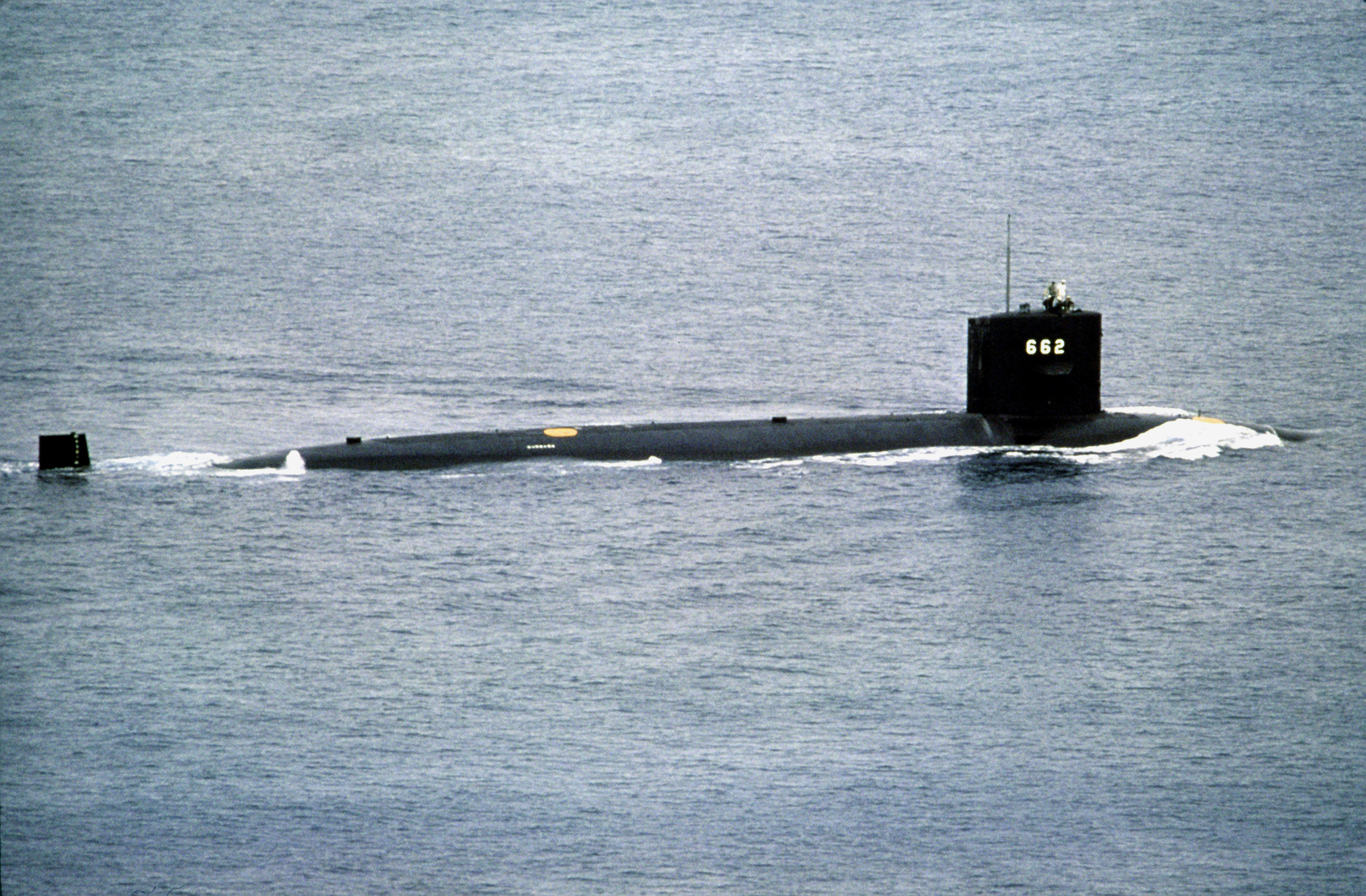
- USS Gurnard (SSN-662) departing San Diego, California, on 1 February 1991.

History

United States
- Name: USS Gurnard (SSN-662)
- Namesake: The gurnard, a food fish of the genus Trigla, a part of the sea robin family
- Ordered: 24 October 1963
- Builder: Mare Island Naval Shipyard, Vallejo, California
- Laid down: 22 December 1964
- Launched: 20 May 1967
- Sponsored by: Mrs. George P. Miller
- Commissioned: 6 December 1968
- Decommissioned: 28 April 1995
- Stricken: 28 April 1995
- Motto: De Profundis; ("From The Depths")
- Fate: Scrapping via Ship and Submarine Recycling Program completed 15 October 1997

General characteristics
- Class & type: Sturgeon-class attack submarine
- Displacement: 4,010 long tons (4,074 t) light; 4,309 long tons (4,378 t) full; 299 long tons (304 t) dead
- Length: 292 ft (89 m)
- Beam: 32 ft (9.8 m)
- Draft: 29 ft (8.8 m)
- Installed power: 15,000 shaft horsepower (11.2 megawatts)
- Propulsion: One S5W nuclear reactor, two steam turbines, one screw
- Speed: Over 20 knots (37 km/h; 23 mph)
- Test depth: 1,300 feet (400 meters)
- Complement: 109 (14 officers, 95 enlisted men)
- Armament: 4 × 21-inch (533 mm) torpedo tubes

USS Gurnard (SSN-662), a Sturgeon-class submarine, was the second ship of the United States Navy to be named for the gurnard, a food fish of the genus Trigla and part of the sea robin family.

== Construction and commissioning ==
The contract to build Gurnard was awarded to Mare Island Naval Shipyard at Vallejo, California, on 24 October 1963, and her keel was laid down there on 22 December 1964. She was launched on 20 May 1967, sponsored by Mrs. George P. Miller, and commissioned on 6 December 1968.

== Service history ==
On 8 July 1972, USS Barb (SSN-596) lay in Apra Harbor completing repairs prior to a patrol in the Mariana Islands. Typhoon Rita was approaching Guam, and Barb intended to be at sea and submerged before the storm arrived. Shortly after 04:00 hours, "Cobalt 2", a B-52 Stratofortress of the Strategic Air Command commanded by United States Air Force Captain Leroy Johnson, took off from Andersen Air Force Base, intending to fly over the storm. Soon after takeoff, however, the aircraft became uncontrollable, and the crew bailed out. By 05:25, the six-man crew were in the ocean. A C-97 Stratofreighter spotted the survivors, and Barb was ordered to proceed at best speed and effect rescue. At about 23:00, Barb surfaced about 12 miles (19 km) from the reported location. The heavy weather had already forced surface ships to turn back, and caused the round-hulled submarine to roll and corkscrew violently. It was 01:15 hours the next morning before the boat's crew spotted the survivors' lights. They made numerous attempts to rescue the airmen through the night, but did not succeed.

By 07:40 hours, visibility had improved and the typhoon had moved from the immediate area, and the boat approached a group of three rafts. Several attempts to shoot a line to the survivors failed, so Chief Torpedoman Jon Hentz volunteered to swim to them, towing a line. At about 08:15, the rafts holding Major Ronald Dvorak, the Electronic Warfare Officer, Lieutenant William Neely III, the copilot, and Lieutenant Kent Dodson, the navigator, were secured to the submarine. Over the next hour, they were brought aboard, a task made more challenging by the 40-foot (12 m) waves that often exposed the submarine's screw and the ballast tank flood grates at the bottom of the boat. At about 10:00 hours, orbiting aircraft vectored Barb to the next survivor, Airman Daniel Johansen, the aircraft's gunner, who caught a line shot to him and was pulled aboard in less than a quarter-hour.

Meanwhile, Gurnard arrived on the scene, found Captain Leroy Johnson, the aircraft commander, and brought him aboard. Lieutenant Colonel J.L. Vaughn, the radar navigator, had not survived the night. Aircraft sighted his body floating face down, still tied to his raft.

The survivors were carried back to Guam, where each boat was presented the Meritorious Unit Commendation, and ten submariners who played perilous topside roles received individual commendations. Torpedoman Hentz received the Navy and Marine Corps Medal.

Gurnard operated in the Arctic Ocean under the polar ice cap from September to November 1984 in company with one of her sister ships, the attack submarine USS Pintado (SSN-672). On 12 November 1984 Gurnard and Pintado became the third pair of submarines to surface together at the North Pole. In March 1990, Gurnard deployed to the Arctic region during exercise Ice Ex '90 and completed only the fourth winter submerged transit of the Bering Sea. Gurnard surfaced at the North Pole on 18 April, in the company of the USS Seahorse (SSN-669).

== Decommissioning and disposal ==
Gurnard was decommissioned on 28 April 1995 and stricken from the Naval Vessel Register the same day. Her scrapping via the Nuclear-Powered Ship and Submarine Recycling Program at Puget Sound Naval Shipyard in Bremerton, Washington, was completed on 15 October 1997. One diving plane from the Gurnard was saved and used in a sculpture in Magnuson Park in Seattle, WA in 1998. It is entitled "The Fin Project: From Swords into Plowshares"
