= Paul Saunders =

United States Naval officer (1918–2003)

Paul Golden Saunders
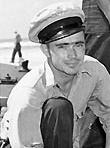
- Paul G. Saunders, August 1945
- Born: January 12, 1918; Richmond, Virginia, U.S.
- Died: August 8, 2003 (aged 85); Dunnellon, Florida, U.S.
- Military career
- Allegiance: United States of America
- Branch: United States Navy
- Service years: 1936–1962
- Rank: Chief Petty Officer
- Nickname: Swish
- Unit: USS Barb (SS-220)
- Conflicts: World War II
- Awards: Silver Star (2); Bronze Star Medal

Paul Golden (Swish) Saunders (January 12, 1918 – August 8, 2003) was a highly decorated United States Navy submarine sailor who was twice awarded the Silver Star medal during World War II.

== Naval career ==
Saunders enlisted in the Navy in 1936 and served for 26 years before retiring as GMGC(SS) (Chief Gunners Mate Guns, Submarine Service) in 1962. Prior to submarines, Chief Saunders served on the light cruiser USS Raleigh (CL-7) and on destroyers McCook (DD-252) and Sampson (DD-394).

Saunders qualified in submarines aboard R-4 (SS-81) in 1940 and subsequently served in Barb (SS-220), Cusk (SS-348), Carbonero (SS-337), and Theodore Roosevelt (SSBN-600).

The only landing of US military forces on the island of Japan during hostilities included Saunders. The landing party destroyed a 16-car train on the coastal railway with an explosive charge, using a microswitch under the rails to trigger the explosion.

He was one of the most decorated enlisted men in the Submarine Service, distinguishing himself during World War II while serving on board the Barb. Saunders made all twelve of Barb’s war patrols, five in the Atlantic and seven in the Pacific and was chief of the boat (COB) for patrols #9–12. He was also COB for the submarines Cusk, Carbonero and Theodore Roosevelt.

He was featured in the book Thunder Below by his USS Barb skipper, Admiral Eugene B. Fluckey.

== Awards ==
During his career, Saunders was awarded the following:

- Submarine Qualification pin
- Submarine Combat pin
- Silver Star with gold star in lieu of second award
- Bronze Star Medal with Combat V
- Letter of Commendation with Ribbon (later converted to the Navy Commendation Medal) with Combat V
- Presidential Unit Citation with three bronze stars in lieu of additional awards
- Navy Unit Commendation
- Navy Good Conduct Medal with silver service star
- American Defense Service Medal with "A" Device
- American Campaign Medal
- European-African-Middle Eastern Campaign Medal with one bronze service star
- Asiatic-Pacific Campaign Medal with one silver and two bronze service stars
- World War II Victory Medal
- National Defense Service Medal
- Philippine Liberation Ribbon

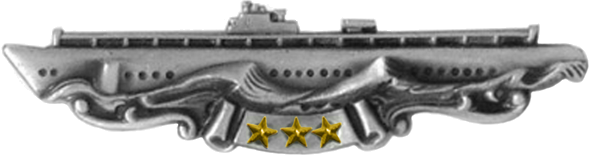

== Post naval career ==
Post World War II found Saunders working in the development of the launching systems for KGW-1 Loon, which was an adaptation of the US Army's JB-2 Doodle Bug, Regulus, and Polaris missiles.

Saunders was a member of Submarine Veterans of World War II and also a member of United States Submarine Veterans, Inc., Nautilus Base.
