= Stephen W. Wilson =

US Air Force general

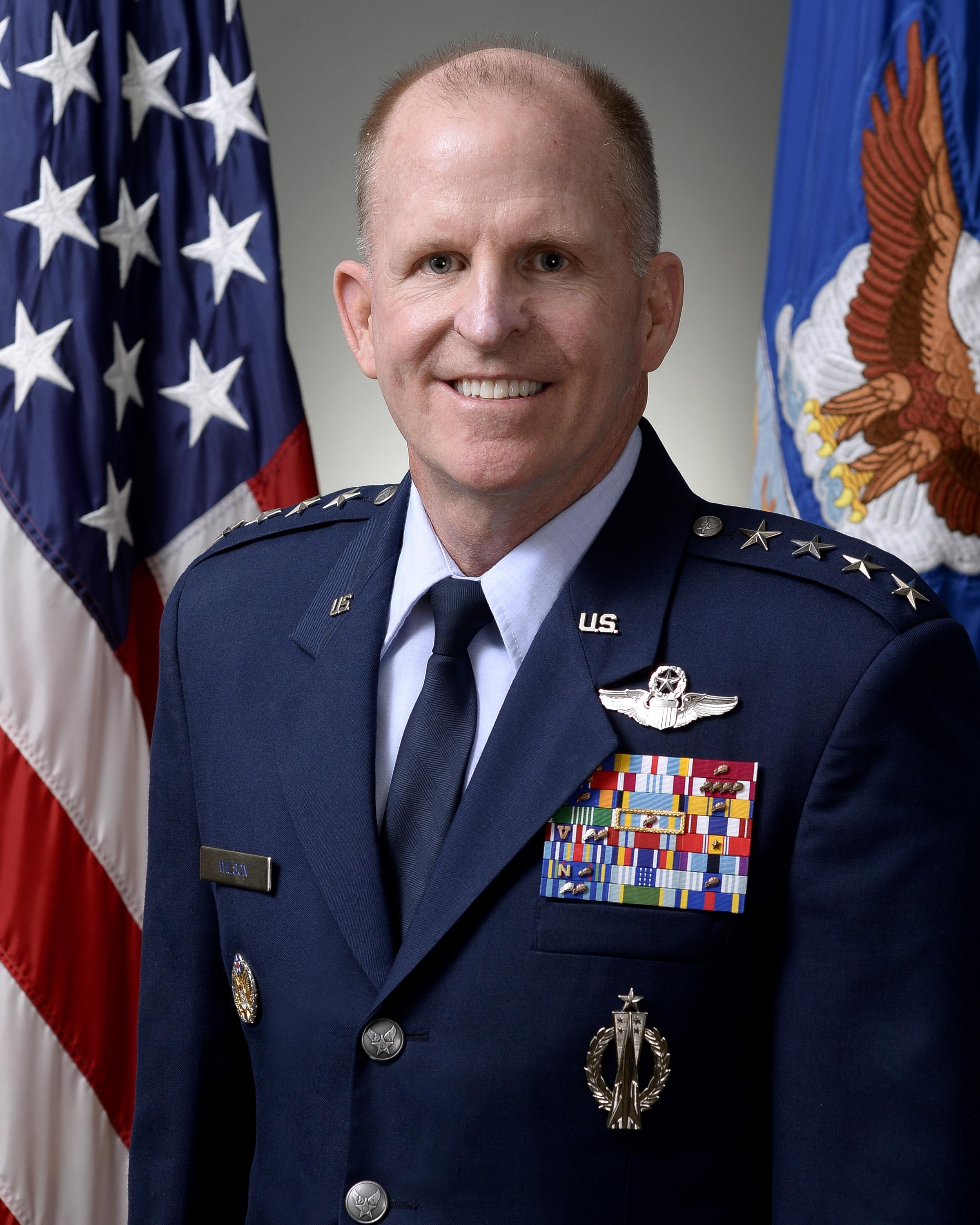
- Official portrait, 2016
- Born: 1959 or 1960 (age 66–67)
- Military career
- Allegiance: United States
- Branch: United States Air Force
- Service years: 1981–2020
- Rank: General
- Commands: Vice Chief of Staff of the Air Force; Air Force Global Strike Command; Eighth Air Force; 379th Air Expeditionary Wing; 14th Flying Training Wing; 608th Air Operations Group
- Awards: Defense Distinguished Service Medal; Air Force Distinguished Service Medal (2); Defense Superior Service Medal; Legion of Merit (2)

Stephen W. "Seve" Wilson (born c. 1959/1960) is a retired United States Air Force four-star general, who last served as the 39th vice chief of staff of the Air Force. He previously served as the deputy commander of United States Strategic Command. Prior to that, he served as the commander of Air Force Global Strike Command, Barksdale Air Force Base, La. In his capacity as commander of Air Force Global Strike Command his responsibilities included organizing, training, equipping, and maintaining all United States ICBM and nuclear-capable bomber forces. Prior to his current assignment, Wilson served as Commander, Eighth Air Force. Wilson was the longest serving vice chief of staff in Air Force history. He had his retirement ceremony on November 13, 2020 and retired effective December 31, 2020. Wilson serves on the Board of Directors of BAE Systems, the U.S. subsidiary of BAE Systems PLC Board. He also serves as an advisor to New Vista Capital.

== Military career ==
Wilson received his commission from Texas A&M University in 1981. He has had multiple flying tours, and led bomber, intelligence, surveillance and reconnaissance, mobility, aeromedical evacuation, and airborne command and control operations supporting Iraqi Freedom, Enduring Freedom and Combined Joint Task Force-Horn of Africa. Wilson has also held numerous command positions, including the Joint Functional Component Commander for Global Strike, where he planned and executed strategic deterrence and global strike operations for United States Strategic Command. During this time, Wilson also commanded Task Force 204 which oversaw the Air Force's nuclear bomber and reconnaissance activities in support of United States Strategic Command.

Wilson is a command pilot with more than 4,500 flying hours and 680 combat hours.

== Education ==
1977 Fort Hunt High School, Alexandria, VA
1981 Bachelor of Science, Aerospace Engineering, Texas A&M University, College Station, Texas
1985 Squadron Officer School, Maxwell AFB, Ala.
1989 Master of Science degree, Engineering Management, South Dakota School of Mines & Technology
1993 Air Command and Staff College, Maxwell AFB, Ala.
1997 U.S. Air Force Weapons School, Nellis AFB, Nev.
2000 Master's degree in strategic studies, Air War College, Maxwell AFB, Ala.
2005 Leadership for a Democratic Society, Federal Executive Institute, Charlottesville, Va.
2007 Joint Force Air Component Commander Course, Maxwell AFB, Ala.
2009 Joint Flag Officer Warfighting Course, Maxwell AFB, Ala.
2010 Leadership Decision Making Program, John F. Kennedy School of Government, Harvard University, Cambridge, Mass.
2013 Pinnacle Course, National Defense University, Fort Lesley J. McNair, Washington, D.C.

== Assignments ==
1. June 1981 – May 1982, student, undergraduate pilot training, Laughlin AFB, Texas
2. May 1982 – September 1986, T-38 Instructor Pilot, evaluator pilot and flight commander, 86th Flying Training Squadron, Laughlin AFB, Texas
3. September 1986 – May 1987, B-1 Student, 338th Combat Training Squadron, Dyess AFB, Texas
4. May 1987 – July 1991, B-1 Instructor Pilot and Flight Commander, 77th Bomb Squadron, Ellsworth AFB, S.D.
5. July 1991 – July 1992, Chief of Weapons and Tactics, 28th Operations Support Squadron, Ellsworth AFB, S.D.
6. July 1992 – July 1993, Student, Air Command and Staff College, Maxwell AFB, Ala.
7. July 1993 – September 1995, Joint Staff Officer, Doctrine, Concepts and Initiatives Division, Plans and Policy (J5), Headquarters U.S. European Command, Stuttgart, Germany
8. September 1995 – June 1997, Chief of Safety, 28th Bomb Wing, later, operations officer, 37th Bomb Squadron, Ellsworth AFB, S.D.
9. June 1997 – June 1999, Commander, B-1 Division, and Instructor Pilot, Weapons Instructor Course, USAF Weapons School, Ellsworth AFB, S.D.
10. August 1999 – June 2000, Student, Air War College, Maxwell AFB, Ala.
11. June 2000 – June 2002, Deputy Commander, 366th Operations Group, Mountain Home AFB, Idaho
12. July 2002 – March 2004, Commander, 608th Air Operations Group, Barksdale AFB, La.
13. March 2004 – June 2006, Commander, 14th Flying Training Wing, Columbus AFB, Miss.
14. June 2006 – July 2007, Deputy Director of Air, Space and Information Operations (A2/3), Headquarters Air Education and Training Command, Randolph AFB, Texas
15. July 2007 – July 2009, Deputy Commander, Canadian North American Aerospace Defense Region, Winnipeg, Manitoba, Canada
16. July 2009 – July 2010, Commander, 379th Air Expeditionary Wing, Southwest Asia
17. July 2010 – June 2011, Director for Joint Integration, Directorate of Operational Capability Requirements, Deputy Chief of Staff for Operations, Plans and Requirements, Headquarters U.S. Air Force, Washington, D.C.
18. June 2011 – October 2013, Commander, Eighth Air Force (Air Forces Strategic), Barksdale AFB, La., and Joint Functional Component Commander for Global Strike, U.S. Strategic Command, Offutt AFB, Neb.
19. October 2013 – July 2015, Commander, Air Force Global Strike Command, Barksdale AFB, La.
20. July 2015 – July 2016, Deputy Commander, U.S. Strategic Command, Offutt, AFB, Neb.
21. July 2016 – November 2020, Vice Chief of Staff of the U.S. Air Force, Washington, D.C.

== Flight information ==
Rating: Command Pilot
Flight hours: More than 4,600, and 680 combat hours
Aircraft flown: T-37, T-38, B-1 and B-52

== Awards and decorations ==
US Air Force Command Pilot Badge
Senior Missile Operations Badge
Headquarters Air Force Badge

Defense Distinguished Service Medal
Air Force Distinguished Service Medal with one bronze oak leaf cluster
Defense Superior Service Medal
Legion of Merit with oak leaf cluster
Bronze Star Medal with oak leaf cluster
Defense Meritorious Service Medal
Meritorious Service Medal with four oak leaf clusters
Air Medal with oak leaf cluster
Aerial Achievement Medal
Air Force Commendation Medal with oak leaf cluster
Army Commendation Medal
Joint Meritorious Unit Award with oak leaf cluster
Air Force Meritorious Unit Award
Air Force Outstanding Unit Award with "V" Device, one silver and one bronze oak leaf clusters
Combat Readiness Medal
National Defense Service Medal with one bronze service star
Global War on Terrorism Expeditionary Medal
Global War on Terrorism Service Medal
Humanitarian Service Medal
Nuclear Deterrence Operations Service Medal with "N" Device and oak leaf cluster
Air Force Overseas Short Tour Service Ribbon
Air Force Overseas Long Tour Service Ribbon with oak leaf cluster
Air Force Longevity Service Award with silver and three bronze oak leaf clusters
Small Arms Expert Marksmanship Ribbon
Air Force Training Ribbon

== Effective dates of promotion ==
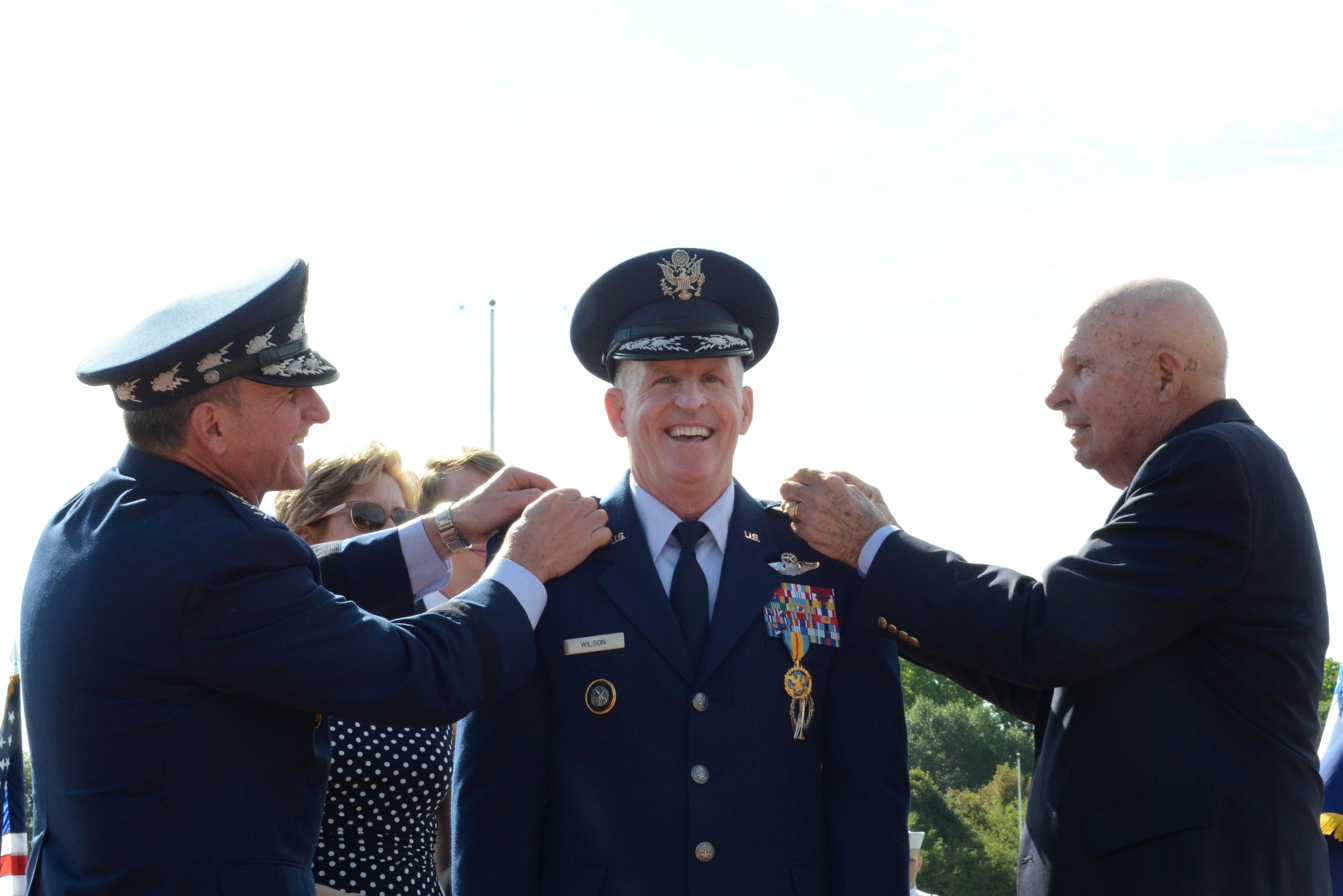
Air Force Chief of Staff Gen. David L. Goldfein and retired Army colonel Joe Wilson pin stars onto the uniform of Wilson during his promotion to general at Offutt Air Force Base, Neb., July 22, 2016.

Insignia	Rank	Date
	General	July 22, 2016
	Lieutenant general	Oct. 23, 2013
	Major general	Sept. 1, 2011
	Brigadier general	Dec. 3, 2007
	Colonel	June 1, 2002
	Lieutenant colonel	Jan. 1, 1997
	Major	June 1, 1993
	Captain	June 2, 1985
	First lieutenant	June 2, 1983
	Second lieutenant	June 2, 1981

Military offices
Preceded by Floyd L. Carpenter	Commander of the Eighth Air Force; 2011–2013	Succeeded by Scott A. Vander Hamm
Preceded by James Kowalski	Commander of the Air Force Global Strike Command; 2013–2015	Succeeded by Robin Rand
Preceded by James Kowalski	Deputy Commander of the United States Strategic Command; 2015–2016	Succeeded by Richard J. Evans III; Acting
Preceded by David L. Goldfein	Vice Chief of Staff of the United States Air Force; 2016–2020	Succeeded by David W. Allvin
