= USS Barb (SSN-596) =

Submarine of the United States

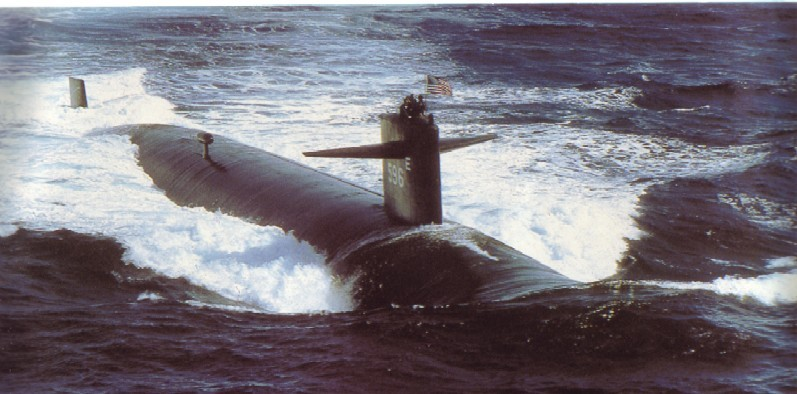
- USS Barb (SSN-596)

History

United States
- Name: USS Barb
- Namesake: Barb (fish)
- Ordered: March 1959
- Builder: Ingalls Shipbuilding, Pascagoula, Mississippi
- Laid down: 9 November 1959
- Launched: 22 February 1962
- Commissioned: 24 August 1963
- Decommissioned: 20 December 1989
- Stricken: 20 December 1989
- Motto: Caveat Tyrannis; ("Tyranny Beware")
- Honors and awards: Two campaign stars for Vietnam War service; Battle "E" for Excellence
- Fate: Recycling via Ship-Submarine Recycling Program completed 14 March 1996

General characteristics
- Class & type: Thresher/Permit-class submarine
- Displacement: 4,400 long tons (4,471 t)
- Length: 278 ft (85 m)
- Beam: 31 ft 8 in (9.65 m)
- Draft: 26 ft (7.9 m)
- Propulsion: S5W PWR
- Speed: 20 knots (37 km/h; 23 mph)
- Complement: 130 officers and men
- Armament: 4 × 21 in (533 mm) torpedo tubes

USS Barb (SSN-596), a Permit-class attack submarine, was the second ship of the United States Navy to be named for the barb, a kingfish of the Atlantic coast.

The contract to build her was awarded to the Ingalls Shipbuilding Corporation in Pascagoula, Mississippi, and her keel was laid down on 9 November 1959. She was launched on 12 February 1962 sponsored by Mrs. Marjorie Fluckey, wife of Rear Admiral Eugene Bennett Fluckey, who earned the Medal of Honor as Commanding Officer of USS Barb (SS-220). The new Barb was commissioned on 24 August 1963.

== Service history ==
=== 1963–1967 ===
Barb departed Pascagoula, Mississippi on 28 September for her shakedown cruise off the west coast. Sailing by way of the Panama Canal and Vallejo, California, she arrived in Puget Sound where she carried out a variety of trials between 30 October and 19 November. The submarine then concluded her shakedown training with a four-week, round-trip voyage to Hawaii. Upon her return to the United States West Coast on 17 December 1963, she entered the Mare Island Naval Shipyard for post-shakedown availability. Those repairs and modifications occupied her for nine months, carrying her well into 1964. On 1 July 1964, her home port was officially changed from Vallejo, California, to Pearl Harbor. Seven weeks later, Barb left the yard at Mare Island and began a somewhat circuitous voyage to her new base, traveling by way of Seattle, Washington.

In Hawaii, as part of Submarine Division 71, the boat pursued an active schedule of training missions in the local operating area. On 1 December 1964, Barb was designated flagship for the Commander, Submarine Force, Pacific Fleet. Local training operations in the Hawaiian Islands took up most of 1965. In fact, save for the period between 9 June and 25 July 1965 during which she voyaged to Mare Island Naval Shipyard for repairs to her sonar, the submarine operated in the Hawaiian area exclusively for two years. In the spring of 1966, Barb completed an advanced training exercise from 3 March to 15 May. In late 1966, the submarine made another extended voyage to the U.S. West Coast during which she visited San Francisco and then carried out weapons alignment tests at Dabob Bay, Washington, before undergoing repairs and modifications at the Puget Sound Naval Shipyard. Barb returned to Hawaii late in October and spent the rest of 1966 in Pearl Harbor in a restricted availability.

=== 1967–1969 ===
Barb resumed a normal training schedule in the Hawaiian operating area through the first four months of 1967. Soon thereafter, however, her routine underwent a significant change when she embarked on her first deployment to the Far East on 9 May. She arrived at Naha, Okinawa, on 22 May, and sailed for Vietnamese waters on the 27th for a Vietnam War tour of duty with Task Group 77.9. After that assignment, Barb made a liberty call at Singapore before heading for Yokosuka on 19 June. The submarine spent nine days at Yokosuka and then returned to sea for almost three weeks of unspecified operations. Another upkeep period back at Yokosuka closed out the month of August, at which point Barb got underway for Hong Kong and a week-long liberty and goodwill visit. While on her way back to the Vietnamese war zone, she received orders diverting her to training duty at Naha, Okinawa. That employment lasted until the second week in October, at which time she headed for Guam. Though diverted briefly to Subic Bay, Barb reached her destination on 15 October. At the conclusion of some tactical exercises and upkeep at Guam, she set out on the voyage back to Hawaii on 24 October. The submarine ended her first Far Eastern deployment when she reentered Pearl Harbor on 1 November.

Following post-deployment standdown, Barb resumed local operations in the Hawaiian Islands at the beginning of 1968. On 11 April 1968 Barb reported dozens of warships, including four or five submarines, of the Soviet Navy's Pacific Fleet all moving slowly and pinging with active sonar. The K-129 was missing, and a series of events that would prompt the building of the Hughes Glomar Explorer six years later had begun.

In late May 1968 she commenced regular overhaul at the Pearl Harbor Naval Shipyard. The maintenance and repairs took up the rest of 1968 and nearly all of 1969. The overhaul ended officially on 8 December 1969, just in time for the annual holiday standdown.

=== 1970–1972 ===
Early in January 1970, Barb sailed to Washington state again to carry out weapons systems' accuracy tests and to test a new type of torpedo. Returning to Hawaii late in February, Barb pursued a normal schedule of local training missions from her base at Pearl Harbor. That occupied her for the remainder of 1970; though, late in the year, she began preparations to deploy overseas.

The submarine left Pearl Harbor for the Western Pacific on 2 January 1971. She combined an extended special operation with her passage west that made the transit an unusually long one. She did not arrive in Yokosuka until 7 February. After two weeks of upkeep there, she headed for Subic Bay where she made a two-day stop. Departing Subic Bay on the 28th, Barb carried out another four weeks of special operations before returning to Subic Bay on 28 March. On the 30th, she embarked on the voyage to Hong Kong where she spent the first week in April. From Hong Kong, the warship sailed to the Mariana Islands, arriving at Guam on the 15th and remaining there for the rest of the month. On 1 May, she returned to sea for eight weeks of special operations. Her deployment ended on 25 June with her arrival back in Pearl Harbor.

After post-deployment standdown, Barb began an extended shipyard availability at the end of July. She left the drydock in mid-October, but other repair work occupied her through the end of 1971 and into 1972 so Barb did not resume normal operations until the spring of 1972.

=== 1972–1976 ===
On 22 May 1972, the submarine deployed to the Marianas area once more and operated from Apra Harbor, Guam, for most of the remainder of the year.

On 8 July 1972, Barb lay in Apra Harbor completing repairs prior to a patrol in the Mariana Islands. Typhoon Rita was approaching Guam, and Barb intended to be at sea and submerged before the storm arrived. Shortly after 04:00 hours, "Cobalt 2", a B-52 Stratofortress of the Strategic Air Command commanded by United States Air Force Captain Leroy Johnson, took off from Andersen Air Force Base, intending to fly over the storm. Soon after takeoff, however, the aircraft became uncontrollable, and the crew bailed out. By 05:25, the six-man crew were in the ocean. A C-97 Stratofreighter spotted the survivors and radioed their location to Joint Search and Rescue at Agana. Barb and submarine Gurnard (SSN-662) were ordered to proceed at best speed to provide rescue. At about 23:00, Barb surfaced about 12 miles (19 km) from the reported location. The heavy weather had already forced surface ships to turn back, and caused the round-hulled submarine to roll and corkscrew violently. It was 01:15 hours the next morning before the boat's crew spotted the survivors' lights. They made numerous attempts to rescue the airmen through the night, but did not succeed.

By 07:40 hours, visibility had improved and the typhoon had moved from the immediate area, and the boat approached a group of three rafts. Several attempts to shoot a line to the survivors failed, so Chief Torpedoman Jon Hentz volunteered to swim to them, towing a line. At about 08:15, the rafts holding Major Ronald Dvorak, the Electronic Warfare Officer, Lieutenant William Neely III, the copilot, and Lieutenant Kent Dodson, the navigator, were secured to the submarine. Over the next hour, they were brought aboard, a task made more challenging by the 40-foot (12 m) waves that often exposed the submarine's screw and the ballast tank flood grates at the bottom of the boat. At about 10:00 hours, orbiting aircraft vectored Barb to the next survivor, Airman Daniel Johansen, the aircraft's gunner, who caught a line shot to him and was pulled aboard in less than a quarter-hour.

Meanwhile, Gurnard arrived on the scene, found Captain Leroy Johnson, the aircraft commander, and brought him aboard. Lieutenant Colonel J.L. Vaughn, the radar navigator, had not survived the night. Aircraft sighted his body floating face down, still tied to his raft.

The survivors were carried back to Guam, where each boat was presented the Meritorious Unit Commendation, and ten submariners who played perilous topside roles received individual commendations. Torpedoman Hentz received the Navy and Marine Corps Medal.

On 15 December 1972, Barb returned to Hawaii. From January to early March 1973, she carried out normal training missions out of her home port. On 10 March, she stood out of Pearl Harbor on a three-month overseas assignment. Following another eight-week special operation, she visited Pusan, South Korea, for four days during the second week in May. From Pusan, the submarine sailed back to the Marianas, in the vicinity of which she operated for about a month before heading back to Hawaii on 10 June. She reentered Pearl Harbor on the 18th.

At the end of the usual month of leave and upkeep, Barb took up local training operations once again in July. In September, she participated in the multinational exercise RIMPAC 73. During the remainder of 1973, the submarine returned to local training duty and began preparations for her second refueling overhaul scheduled to begin the following spring. That overhaul commenced when she entered the Mare Island Naval Shipyard on 1 March 1974, and lasted for just over 20 months. During that time, her home port was changed from Pearl Harbor to San Diego so that, when she completed the overhaul early in November 1975, Barb began her refresher training out of that new home port. Similar assignments carried out all along the west coast of North America occupied her time for almost 16 months. She did not start preparing for another tour of duty overseas until late in 1976, and the deployment itself did not begin until early in 1977.

=== 1977–1979 ===
On 17 February 1977, Barb stood out of San Diego on her way to the Far East. On the first leg of her voyage, she participated in the multinational exercise RIMPAC 77 and then made a two-day call at her former home port, Pearl Harbor, at the end of the month. She then embarked on the transit to Subic Bay, the duration of which was extended by exercises with TG 37.9 and TG 77.3. The submarine arrived in Subic Bay on 18 March but returned to sea almost immediately for the passage to Chinhae, Korea. Along the way, she took part in exercises with units of the Japan Maritime Self-Defense Force and with elements of the South Korean Navy. Barb visited Chinhae from 29 March to 1 April and then called at Hong Kong between 11 and 14 April. From Hong Kong, she set out for the Marianas, exercising with units of the Royal New Zealand Air Force and United States Navy patrol aircraft along the way. The submarine spent the period 20 April to 9 May in port at Guam, then put to sea for the first of two special operations that she conducted in May and June. Barb reentered Guam on 24 May, but returned to sea the following day to begin the second and longer of her two special operations. That employment lasted until the end of June at which time she put into Subic Bay for a week of liberty before heading back to the United States on 7 July.

On the way home, Barb called at Hawaii for several days in the latter part of July, resuming the voyage home on the 25th. She arrived back in San Diego on 2 August. After several weeks of relative inactivity, the submarine embarked on a schedule of local operations highlighted by her selection as a test platform for the Tomahawk cruise missile in late October. She remained so occupied through the end of 1977 into the second quarter of 1978. On 26 April, the warship entered the Mare Island Naval Shipyard for a three-month availability. She resumed normal operations out of San Diego late in July and continued so engaged until deploying to the western Pacific once more on 27 September 1978. Barb spent the week between 3 and 10 October in Hawaii and then resumed her passage west arriving in Subic Bay on the 29th. She stayed in Subic Bay for three weeks and then set sail for Japan on 20 November. After four days of voyage repairs at Yokosuka, she returned to sea on 1 December for a month-long special operation that she concluded at Chinhae, Korea, on the last day of 1978.

The Chinhae visit extended three days into 1979 at which point the submarine set out for the Marianas. She reached Guam on 11 January and remained there through the end of the month. On 1 February, she embarked on the voyage to Subic Bay where she arrived on the 6th. Three days later, Barb put to sea to take part in MULTIPLEX 2-79 that lasted until the 21st. She returned to Subic Bay for the last week in February before setting out on the voyage home on the 28th. Almost three weeks later, on 17 March, Barb stood into San Diego and commenced seven weeks of post-deployment leave and upkeep. At the end of the first week in May, she embarked upon a normal training routine that she carried out in the southern California operating area. Similar evolutions occupied her for the rest of 1979 and into the first weeks of 1980.

=== 1980–1989 ===
On 7 February 1980, Barb deployed to the mid-Pacific region to conduct equipment tests and procedure evaluations and to take part in the multinational exercise, RIMPAC 80. Based at Pearl Harbor, she carried out those missions until early April when she returned to San Diego. Another seven-week upkeep period followed, after which she resumed local operations out of San Diego. The submarine continued to pursue training assignments locally until July. On 21 July, Barb entered the Mare Island Naval Shipyard for an unusually extensive overhaul, which lasted until late 1982. The propulsion plant underwent steam generator cleaning. The fire control and sonar systems were replaced with the latest AN/BQQ-5 sonar and digital fire control technology. Barb received the complete SUBSAFE package of modifications the Navy first began installing on submarines in the 1960s. What was to have been an 18-month overhaul stretched into 27 months due to shipyard repair quality problems and scheduling delays. Barb underwent not one but four sea trials as each trial identified additional re-work to be done at the shipyard. Barb eventually returned to the Point Loma submarine base in San Diego, California in December 1982. Additional re-work was done in floating dry-dock in San Diego in early 1983.

History for 1983-1989 needed.

Barb was deactivated on 10 March 1989, then decommissioned and stricken from the Naval Vessel Register on 20 December 1989. Ex-Barb entered the Nuclear Powered Ship and Submarine Recycling Program in Bremerton, Washington, and on 14 March 1996 ceased to exist.

== Honors and awards ==
- Navy Unit Commendation (earned in the Spring of 1966 and awarded in 1968).
- Meritorious Unit Commendation - two awards (1972 and 1973)
- Navy E Ribbon (December 1978 to September 1980)
- National Defense Service Medal
- Vietnam Service Medal with two campaign stars (1967 and 1971)
- Republic of Vietnam Campaign Medal
