= Tom Whittaker (mountaineer) =

Mountain climber - first disabled person to climb to the summit of Mount Everest

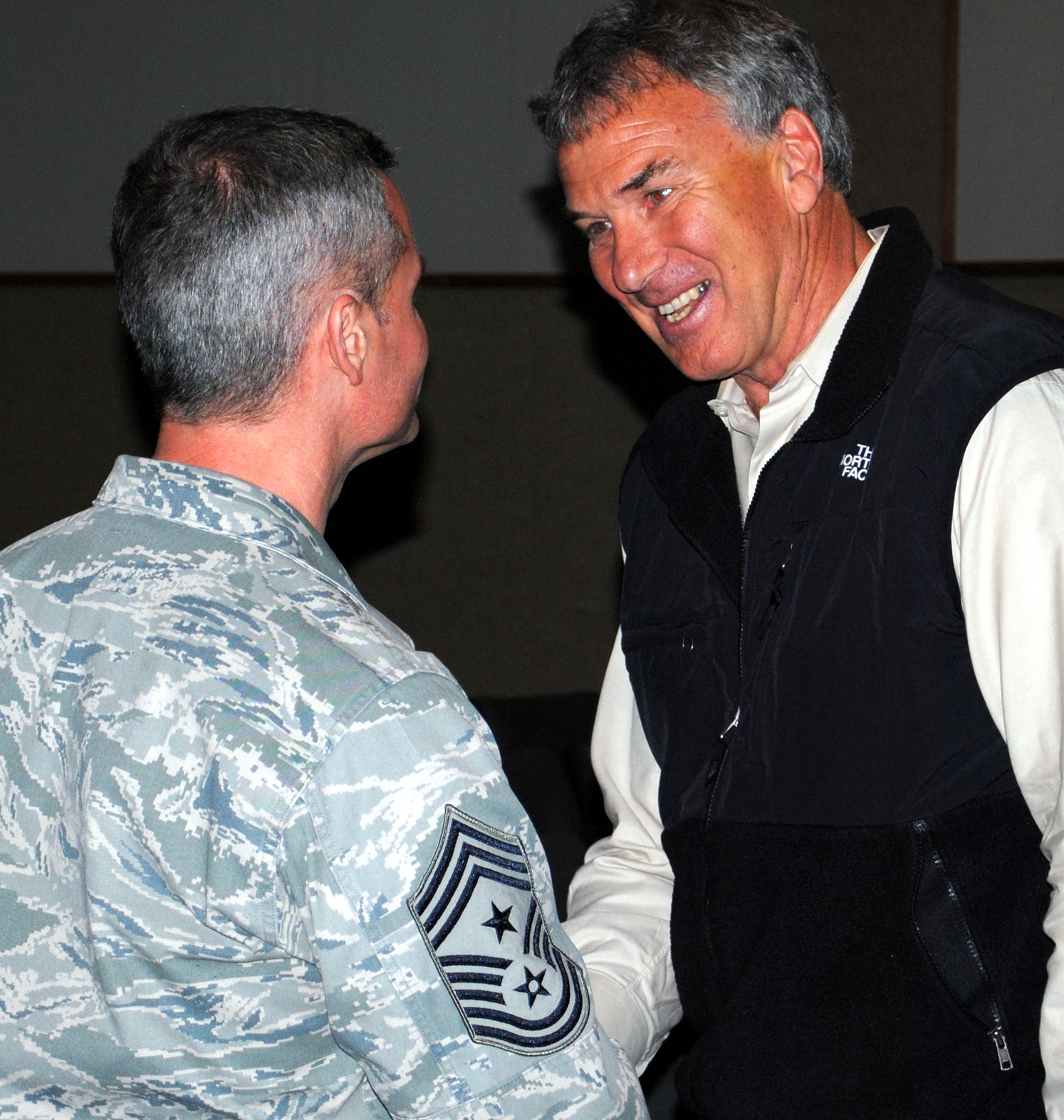
- Born: 1948 (age 77–78)
- Education: Idaho State University

Tom Whittaker (born 1948 in York) was the first disabled person to climb to the summit of Mount Everest.

Whittaker's right foot needed to be amputated following a car accident in 1979. Following this serious accident, he regained his strength and continued climbing. He was educated at Idaho State University.

In 1981, he founded the Cooperative Wilderness Handicapped Outdoor Group (C.W.HOG) in Pocatello, Idaho. While living in Idaho, he was active in the southeast Idaho climbing community.

His first attempt on Everest was in 1995.

On May 27, 1998, on his third attempt, Whittaker reached the summit of Mount Everest, a lifelong dream, making him the first person with a disability to accomplish this feat.

Whittaker's current quest is to climb the highest peaks on all seven continents.

In the 2006, Queen's Birthday Honours List, Whittaker was appointed Member of the Order of the British Empire (MBE). Tom currently lives in Prescott, Arizona with his daughter, Georgia.
