= USS Vermont =

Three ships of the United States Navy have been named USS Vermont in honor of the 14th state.

- The first USS Vermont (1848) was one of nine ships of the line authorized by Congress in 1816, but it was not launched until 1848, and only ever saw service as a receiving ship, from 1862 to 1901.
- The second USS Vermont (BB-20) was a Connecticut-class battleship
- The third USS Vermont (SSN-792) is a Virginia-class submarine

== See also ==
- SS Green Mountain State, an auxiliary Keystone State-class crane ship launched in 1964 and in ready reserve since 1992.
