= USS Barb (SS-220) =

US Navy Gato-class submarine

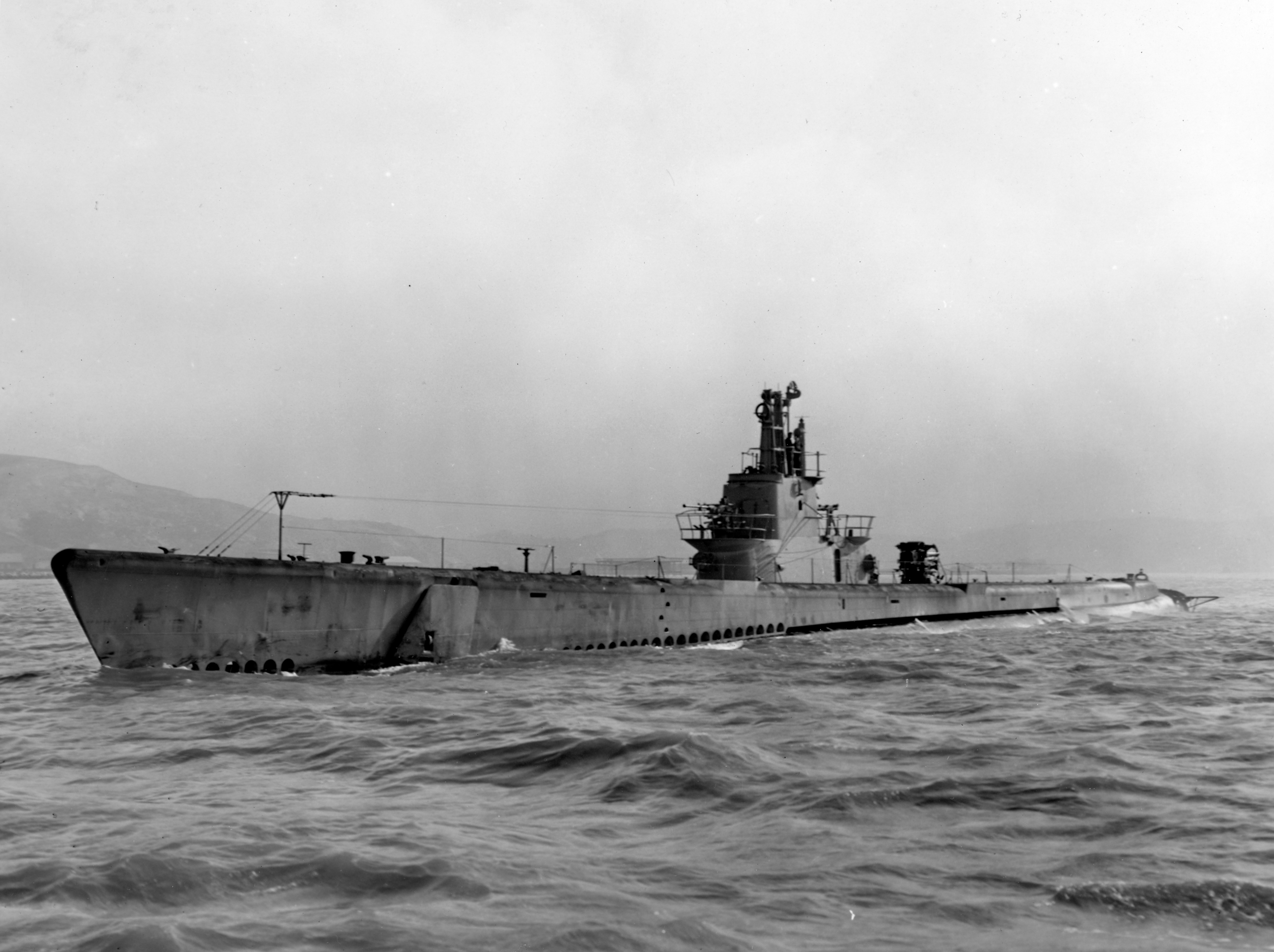
- USS Barb "The Submarine that sank the greatest tonnage by Japanese Records"

History

United States
- Name: USS Barb
- Namesake: tiger barb
- Builder: General Dynamics Electric Boat, Groton, Connecticut
- Laid down: 7 June 1941
- Launched: 2 April 1942
- Sponsored by: Mrs. Charles A. Dunn
- Commissioned: 8 July 1942
- Decommissioned: 12 February 1947
- Identification: SS-220
- Recommissioned: 3 December 1951
- Decommissioned: 5 February 1954
- Recommissioned: 3 August 1954
- Decommissioned: 13 December 1954
- Stricken: 15 October 1972
- Fate: Transferred to Italy on 13 December 1954

Italy
- Name: Enrico Tazzoli
- Acquired: 13 December 1954
- Identification: S 511
- Fate: Sold for scrap in 1972

General characteristics
- Class & type: Gato-class diesel-electric submarine
- Displacement: 1,525 long tons (1,549 t) surfaced, 2,424 long tons (2,463 t) submerged
- Length: 311 ft 9 in (95.02 m)
- Beam: 27 ft 3 in (8.31 m)
- Draft: 17 ft (5.2 m) maximum
- Propulsion: 4 × General Motors Model 16-248 V16 Diesel engines driving electric generators; 2 × 126-cell Sargo batteries; 4 × high-speed General Electric electric motors with reduction gears; two propellers; 5,400 shp (4.0 MW) surfaced; 2,740 shp (2.0 MW) submerged
- Speed: 21 kn (39 km/h) surfaced, 9 kn (17 km/h) submerged
- Range: 11,000 nmi (20,000 km) surfaced @ 10 kn (19 km/h)
- Endurance: 48 hours @ 2 kn (3.7 km/h) submerged, 75 days on patrol
- Test depth: 300 ft (91 m)
- Complement: 6 officers, 54 enlisted
- Armament: 10 × 21-inch (533 mm) torpedo tubes; 6 forward, 4 aft; 24 torpedoes; 1 × 3-inch (76 mm) / 50 caliber deck gun; Bofors 40 mm and Oerlikon 20 mm cannon

USS Barb (SS-220), a Gato-class submarine, was the first ship of the United States Navy to be named for the tiger barb, a genus of ray-finned fish. She compiled one of the most outstanding records of any U.S. submarine in World War II. During her twelve war patrols, Barb is officially credited with sinking 17 enemy vessels totaling 96,628 tons, including the Japanese aircraft carrier Un'yō. In recognition of one outstanding patrol, Barb received the Presidential Unit Citation. On her twelfth and final patrol of the war, she landed a party of carefully selected crew members who blew up a train, the only ground combat operation in the Japanese (four main) home islands.

== United States Navy service history ==
=== World War II ===
The keel of USS Barb was laid down on 7 June 1941 by the Electric Boat Company of Groton, Connecticut. She was launched on 2 April 1942 (sponsored by Mrs. Charles A. Dunn, wife of Rear Admiral Dunn), and commissioned on 8 July 1942.

Barb's war operations spanned the period from 20 October 1942 – 2 August 1945, during which time she completed 12 war patrols.

==== European Theater – First through fifth patrols ====
During her first patrol she carried out reconnaissance duties prior to, and during, the invasion of North Africa. Operating out of Rosneath naval base, Scotland until July 1943, she conducted her next four patrols against the Axis blockade runners in European waters. Barb's fifth patrol terminated 1 July and she proceeded to the Submarine Base, New London, Connecticut, arriving on 24 July.

==== Pacific Theater – Sixth through twelfth patrols ====
Following a brief overhaul period at New London, Barb departed for Pearl Harbor where she arrived in September. It was in the Pacific waters that Barb found lucrative hunting and went on to compile one of the more outstanding submarine records of World War II. During the seven war patrols she conducted in the Pacific between March 1944 and August 1945, Barb is officially credited with sinking 17 enemy vessels totaling 96,628 tons, including Un'yō, sunk on 17 September 1944. On 15–16 September Barb rescued 14 Australian and British POW survivors of SS Rakuyō Maru.

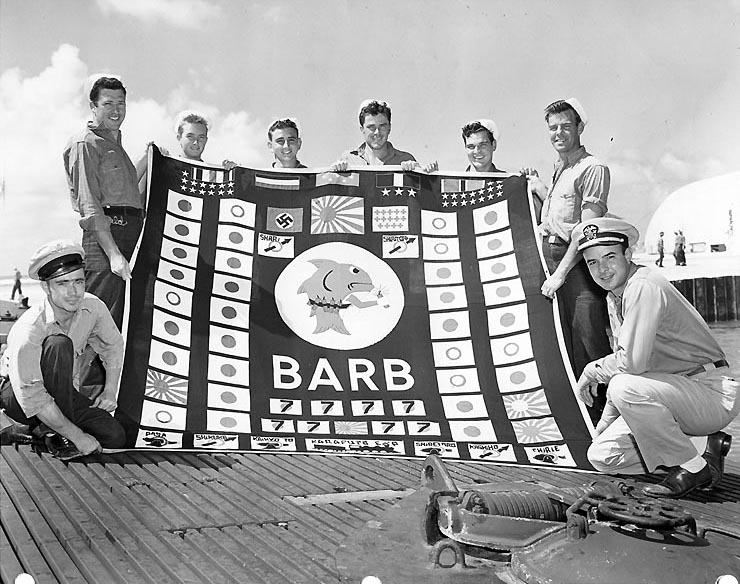
Members of the submarine's demolition squad pose with her battle flag at the conclusion of her 12th war patrol. Taken at Pearl Harbor, August 1945.

The last five war patrols (8-12) conducted by Barb were under Commander Eugene B. Fluckey. Her 11th patrol lasted from 19 December 1944 – 15 February 1945, in the Formosa Straits and East China Sea off the east coast of China, from Shanghai to Kam Kit. During this patrol, Barb sank four Japanese merchant ships and numerous enemy small craft. On 22–23 January Barb penetrated Namkwan Harbor now called Yanpu Wan (沿浦湾) on the China coast, opposite the Matsu Islands, and wrought havoc upon a convoy of some 30 enemy ships at anchor. Maneuvering in dangerously shallow waters, Barb launched her torpedoes into the enemy group and then retired at high speed on the surface in a full hour's run through uncharted, heavily mined, and rock-obstructed waters. In recognition of this outstanding patrol, Commander Fluckey was awarded the Medal of Honor and Barb received the Presidential Unit Citation.

Upon completion of her 11th patrol, Barb was sent to the U.S. for a yard overhaul and alterations, which included the installation of 5 in (130 mm) rocket launchers at the Captain's request. Returning to the Pacific, she commenced her 12th and final patrol of World War II on 8 June. This patrol was conducted along the coasts of the Sea of Okhotsk. For the first time in U.S. submarine warfare, Barb successfully employed rockets, against the towns of Shari, Hokkaido; Shikuka; Kashiho; and Shiritoru on Karafuto. On 2 July; she also bombarded the garrison on Tyuleny (Kaihyo) Island with her regular armament, destroying the constructions and causing a fire. She next landed a party of carefully selected crew members who blew up a railroad train.

During the night of 22–23 July 1945 these men went ashore at Karafuto, Japan, and planted an explosive charge that subsequently wrecked a train. They were: Chief Gunners Mate Paul G. Saunders, USN; Electricians Mate 3rd Class Billy R. Hatfield, USNR; Signalman 2nd Class Francis Neal Sever, USNR; Ships Cook 1st Class Lawrence W. Newland, USN; Torpedoman's mate 3rd Class Edward W. Klingesmith, USNR; Motor Machinists Mate 2nd Class James E. Richard, USNR; Motor Machinists Mate 1st Class John Markuson, USN; and Lieutenant William M. Walker, USNR. This raid is represented by the train symbol in the middle bottom of the battle flag.

=== Post-war history ===
Returning to the United States after the cessation of hostilities, Barb was placed in commissioned reserve on 9 March 1946 and decommissioned reserve on 12 February 1947 at New London, Connecticut. On 3 December 1951, she was recommissioned and assigned to the Atlantic Fleet, operating out of Key West, Florida. She was again decommissioned on 5 February 1954 and underwent the Greater Underwater Propulsion Power Program (GUPPY) conversion. Recommissioned on 3 August 1954, she served with the Atlantic Fleet until 13 December 1954, when she was decommissioned a final time and loaned to Italy under the Mutual Defense Assistance Program.

== Enrico Tazzoli (S 511) ==
The submarine was renamed Enrico Tazzoli (S 511) by the Italian Navy, after Enrico Tazzoli, an Italian priest.

The submarine was eventually sold for scrap in 1972 for approximately $100,000 (equivalent to $770,000 in 2025). Admiral Fluckey noted that, had the crew known of this, they would have bought the sub and brought her back to the U.S. to serve as a museum ship.

== Awards ==
- Presidential Unit Citation
- Navy Unit Commendation
- European–African–Middle Eastern Campaign Medal with one battle star
- Asiatic-Pacific Campaign Medal with seven battle stars
- World War II Victory Medal
- National Defense Service Medal

== Legacy ==
Barb's battle flag is on display at the Submarine Force Library and Museum in Groton, Connecticut.

Another submarine was named for USS Barb and served in the U.S. Navy from 1963 to 1989.

On 13 October 2020, Secretary of the Navy Kenneth Braithwaite announced that a future Virginia-class submarine (SSN-804) will be named for USS Barb.

== See also ==
- List of most successful American submarines in World War II
