= Submarine Squadron 1 =

Submarine Squadron One
- Active: May 1941–present
- Country: United States of America
- Branch: United States Navy
- Part of: Commander, Naval Submarine Force Pacific (COMSUBPAC)
- Garrison/HQ: Joint Base Pearl Harbor–Hickam, Submarine Base Administration and Repair Shop, Building 661
- Nickname(s): Wolfpack 1-41
- Motto(s): Number ONE since 1941

Commanders
- Commodore: CAPT Chris Hedrick
- Notable commanders: ADM Cecil Haney, RADM Rick Seif

Submarine Squadron 1 (also known as SUBRON 1) is a squadron of submarines of the United States Navy based at Joint Base Pearl Harbor–Hickam, Pearl Harbor, Hawai'i. The submarines that make up SUBRON 1 include:

- USS Hawaii (SSN 776)
- USS North Carolina (SSN-777)
- USS Mississippi (SSN-782)
- USS Illinois (SSN-786)
- USS Vermont (SSN-792)
- USS Montana (SSN-794)

== History ==
=== Strategic deterrent ===
Between 1959 and 1964, SUBRON 1 operated as part of the US Navy's contribution to the United States' strategic nuclear deterrent. A total of five submarines designed to operate the SSM-N-8 Regulus cruise missile were stationed at Pearl Harbor to undertake deterrent patrols in the Pacific Ocean. The five boats of SUBRON 1 (4 diesel-electric and 1 nuclear-powered) maintained a constant presence, with at least four Regulus missiles at sea at all times for the five years of the weapon's use as part of the nuclear triad. SUBRON 1 was eventually replaced in this role by SUBRON 15, which operated seven ballistic missile submarines from 1965 onwards.

==== Strategic deterrent submarines ====
- USS Tunny (SS-282)
- USS Barbero (SS-317)
- USS Grayback (SSG-574)
- USS Growler (SSG-577)
- USS Halibut (SSGN-587)

== Commanders ==
Previous commanders have included Cecil D. Haney from June 2002 to July 2004 and Harry L. Ganteaume from October 2013 to March 2015. Below is a list of all previous commanders:

- Captain R. S. Edwards - May 1941 to March 1942
- Captain E. F. Curtis - March 1942 to March 1943
- Captain M. M. Stephen - March 1943 to June 1943
- Captain C. W. Gray - June 1943 to August 1944
- Captain W. L. Hoffheins - August 1944 to October 1945
- Captain W. D. Wilkins - October 1945 to June 1946
- Captain R. J. Foley - June 1946 to April 1948
- Captain W. S. Stovall, Jr. - April 1948 to January 1950
- Captain R. R. McGregor - January 1950 to July 1950
- Captain D. L. Whelchel - July 1950 to August 1951
- Captain J. C. Dempsey - August 1951 to July 1952
- Captain T. W. Hogan - July 1952 to June 1953
- Captain M. E. Harrison - June 1953 to August 1954
- Captain D. G. Irvine - August 1954 to October 1955
- Captain C. C. Cole - October 1955 to July 1956
- Captain J. D. Fulp - July 1956 to July 1957
- Captain A. K. Tyree - July 1957 to July 1958
- Captain B. C. Hills - July 1958 to October 1959
- Captain R. F. Sellars - October 1959 to November 1960
- Captain D. G. Baer - November 1960 to September 1961
- Captain L. B. McDonald - September 1961 to August 1962
- Captain S. S. Mann - August 1962 to August 1963
- Captain R. K. Kaufman - August 1963 to September 1964
- Captain F. B. Clarke - September 1964 to September 1965
- Captain T. H. William - September 1965 to July 1966
- Captain D. A. Paolucci - July 1966 to July 1967
- Captain W. L. Siple - July 1967 to January 1969
- Captain R. B. Cowdrey - January 1969 to March 1970
- Captain J. B. Wilson - March 1970 to March 1971
- Captain R. S. Leddick - March 1971 to August 1972
- Captain T. L. Malone, Jr. - August 1972 to May 1973
- Captain R. W. Chewning - May 1973 to July 1974
- Captain R. R. Wight - July 1974 to August 1976
- Captain W. J. Holland, Jr. - August 1976 to June 1978
- Captain C. G. Foster - June 1978 to August 1980
- Captain R. F. Bacon - August 1980 to May 1982
- Captain A. H. Pauole - May 1982 to July 1984
- Captain A. L. Cheaure - July 1984 to August 1986
- Captain R. A. Riddell - August 1986 to July 1988
- Captain E. D. Morrow - July 1988 to June 1990
- Captain C. A. Wiese - June 1990 to May 1992
- Captain S. A. Arndt - May 1992 to August 1994
- Captain D. P. Miller - August 1994 to July 1996
- Captain T. G. Kyle - July 1996 to August 1998
- Captain D. M. McCall - August 1998 to August 2000
- Captain R. L. Snead - August 2000 to July 2002
- Captain C. D. Haney - July 2002 to July 2004
- Captain M. A. Zieser - July 2004 to June 2006
- Captain S. G. Marr - June 2006 to June 2007
- Captain L. R. Hankins - June 2007 to July 2009
- Captain S. M. Robertson - July 2009 to February 2012
- Captain J. C. Childs - February 2012 to October 2013
- Captain H. L. Ganteaume - October 2013 to March 2015
- Captain T. A. Rexrode - March 2015 to January 2017
- Captain R. J. Seif - January 2017 to January 2019
- Captain Wesley Bringham - January 2019 to October 2019
- Captain Melvin R. Smith - October 2020 to August 2022
- Captain Aaron C. Peterson - August 2022 to May 2025
- Captain Christopher Hedrick - May 2025 to present

The squadron was first established in May 1941 at New London, Connecticut. There were originally nineteen submarines in the squadron. On October 1, 1945, it moved to the Pacific Fleet at Pearl Harbor, Hawaii and has remained there ever since.

== See also ==
- History of the United States Navy
