= Eugene B. Fluckey =

United States Navy Medal of Honor recipient (1913–2007)

Eugene Bennett Fluckey
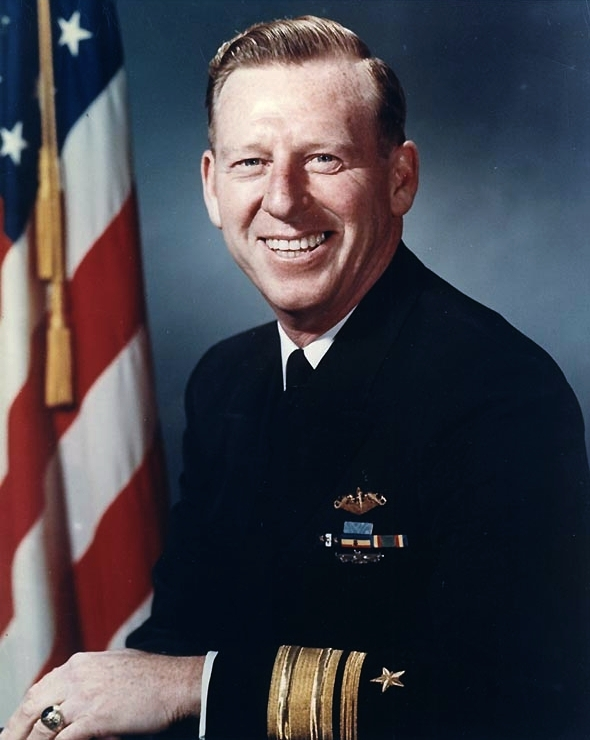
- Born: October 5, 1913; Washington, D.C., U.S.
- Died: June 28, 2007 (aged 93); Annapolis, Maryland, U.S.
- Burial place: United States Naval Academy Cemetery
- Military career
- Allegiance: United States
- Branch: United States Navy
- Service years: 1935–1972
- Rank: Rear admiral
- Nickname: Lucky
- Commands: USS Barb (SS-220); USS Halfbeak (SS-352); USS Sperry (AS-12); Submarine Flotilla Seven; Amphibious Group Four; Board of Inspection and Survey; Submarine Force, U.S. Pacific Fleet; Naval Intelligence; Military Assistance Advisory Group, Portugal
- Conflicts: World War II: Submarine campaign against Japan; Battle of Convoy HI-81
- Awards: Medal of Honor; Navy Cross (4); Navy Distinguished Service Medal (2); Legion of Merit (2)
- Other work: Orphanage Director, Portugal

Eugene Bennett Fluckey (October 5, 1913 – June 28, 2007), nicknamed "Lucky Fluckey", was a United States Navy rear admiral who received the Medal of Honor and four Navy Crosses during his service as a submarine commander in World War II.

After 37 years on active duty in the U.S. Navy, Fluckey retired in 1972, publishing a memoir, Thunder Below! twenty years later in 1992. In his recollections, Fluckey credited his Medal of Honor to the actions of the entire crew of USS Barb, detailing his efforts to ensure their valor was properly recognized. Fluckey remained active in the veterans' community for the remainder of his life, and together with his wife Marjorie (and his second wife, Margaret) ran an orphanage in Portugal from 1974 to 1982.

Fluckey died in 2007 at age 93; he is buried at the United States Naval Academy Cemetery.

== Early life ==
Fluckey was born in Washington, D.C., on October 5, 1913. He graduated from Western High School in Washington at age 15. He was too young to go to college, so his father sent him to the Mercersburg Academy in Mercersburg, Pennsylvania. He also was a member of the Boy Scouts, achieving the rank of Eagle Scout. He prepared for the Naval Academy at Columbian Preparatory School, Washington.

== U.S. Navy career ==
Fluckey entered the United States Naval Academy on June 13, 1931, graduated and was commissioned an ensign on June 6, 1935. One of his classmates was Samuel Adams.

His initial assignments with the Navy were aboard the battleship USS Nevada (BB-36), and in May 1936 he was transferred to the destroyer USS McCormick (DD-223). In June 1938, he reported for instruction at the Submarine School, New London, Connecticut, and upon completion in December, he served on the submarine USS S-42 (SS-153), and in June 1941, he was assigned to the submarine USS Bonita (SS-165).

=== World War II ===
He completed five war patrols on the Bonita and after he was detached from the submarine in June 1942, he returned to Annapolis for graduate instruction in naval engineering. In December 1943, he attended the Prospective Commanding Officer's School at the Submarine Base New London until January 1944, then reported to Commander Submarine Force, Pacific Fleet. After one war patrol as the prospective commanding officer of the submarine USS Barb (SS-220), he became the submarine's seventh commander in January 1944 to August 1945. Fluckey established himself as one of the greatest submarine skippers, credited with the second most tonnage sunk by a U.S. Naval skipper during World War II (after Richard O'Kane) at 179,700 tons: to include 25 ships including a carrier, cruiser, and frigate.

In one of the more unusual incidents in the war, Fluckey sent a landing party ashore to set demolition charges on a coastal railway line on Sakhalin Island (then part of Japan's Karafuto Prefecture), destroying a 16-car train. This was the sole landing by U.S. military forces on the Japanese home islands during World War II. Fluckey ordered that this landing party be composed of crewmen from every division on his submarine. "He chose an eight-man team with no married men to blow up the train", Captain Max Duncan said, who served as Torpedo Officer on the Barb during this time. "He also wanted former Boy Scouts because he thought they could find their way back. They were paddling back to the ship when the train blew up." The selected crewmen were Paul Saunders, William Hatfield, Francis Sever, Lawrence Newland, Edward Klinglesmith, James Richard, John Markuson, and William Walker. Hatfield wired the explosive charge, using a microswitch under the rails to trigger the explosion.

Fluckey was awarded four Navy Crosses for extraordinary heroism during the eighth, ninth, tenth, and twelfth war patrols of Barb. During his famous eleventh patrol, he continued to revolutionize submarine warfare, inventing the night convoy attack from astern by joining the flank escort line. He attacked two convoys at anchor 26 miles (42 km) inside the 20 fathoms (37 m) curve on the China coast, totaling more than 30 ships. With two frigates pursuing, Barb set a then-world speed record for a submarine of 23.5 knots (43.5 km/h) using 150% overload. For his conspicuous gallantry and intrepidity, Fluckey received the Medal of Honor. Barb received the Presidential Unit Citation for the eighth through eleventh patrols and the Navy Unit Commendation for the twelfth patrol.

=== Post-war ===
In August 1945, Fluckey was ordered to Naval Submarine Base New London in Groton, Connecticut in September, to fit out the USS Dogfish (SS-350) and to be that submarine's commanding officer, upon her completion. After the Dogfish's launching, however, he was transferred in November to the Office of the Secretary of the Navy to work directly for James V. Forrestal on plans for the unification of the Armed Forces. From there he went to the War Plans Division. In November 1945, he was selected by Fleet Admiral Chester W. Nimitz, the incoming Chief of Naval Operations, as his personal aide. On June 9, 1947, he returned to submarines, assuming command of USS Halfbeak (SS-352) until May 1948, the second submarine to be converted to a GUPPY-type high-speed attack submarine with a snorkel. In May 1948, he was ordered to the staff of the commander of the Submarine Force U.S. Atlantic Fleet to set up the Submarine Naval Reserve Force, until July 1950.

In August 1950, he became the flag secretary to Admiral James Fife, Jr. From August 1950 until July 1953, he served as the U.S. Naval Attaché and Naval Attaché for Air to Portugal. The Portuguese government, for his distinguished service, decorated him with the Medalha de Mérito Militar, noting that this was the first time this decoration was awarded to a naval attaché of any other nation. He was the commander of Submarine Division Fifty-Two of Submarine Squadron Five from August 1953 to June 1954. In June 1954, he took command of the submarine tender USS Sperry (AS-12) until July 1955. Fluckey commanded Submarine Flotilla Seven (now Submarine Group 7) from October 14, 1955, to January 14, 1956. He then returned to the Naval Academy to become the chairman of the Electrical Engineering Department.

His selection for the rank of rear admiral was approved by President Dwight D. Eisenhower in July 1960, and in October, he reported as commander, Amphibious Group 4. In November 1961, he became the president of the Naval Board of Inspection and Survey, Washington, D.C. He was ComSubPac (Commander Submarine Force, Pacific Fleet), from June 1964 to June 1966. In July 1966, he became the director of naval intelligence. Two years later, he became chief of the Military Assistance Advisory Group, Portugal.

Fluckey retired from active duty as a rear admiral in 1972.

== Retirement and death ==
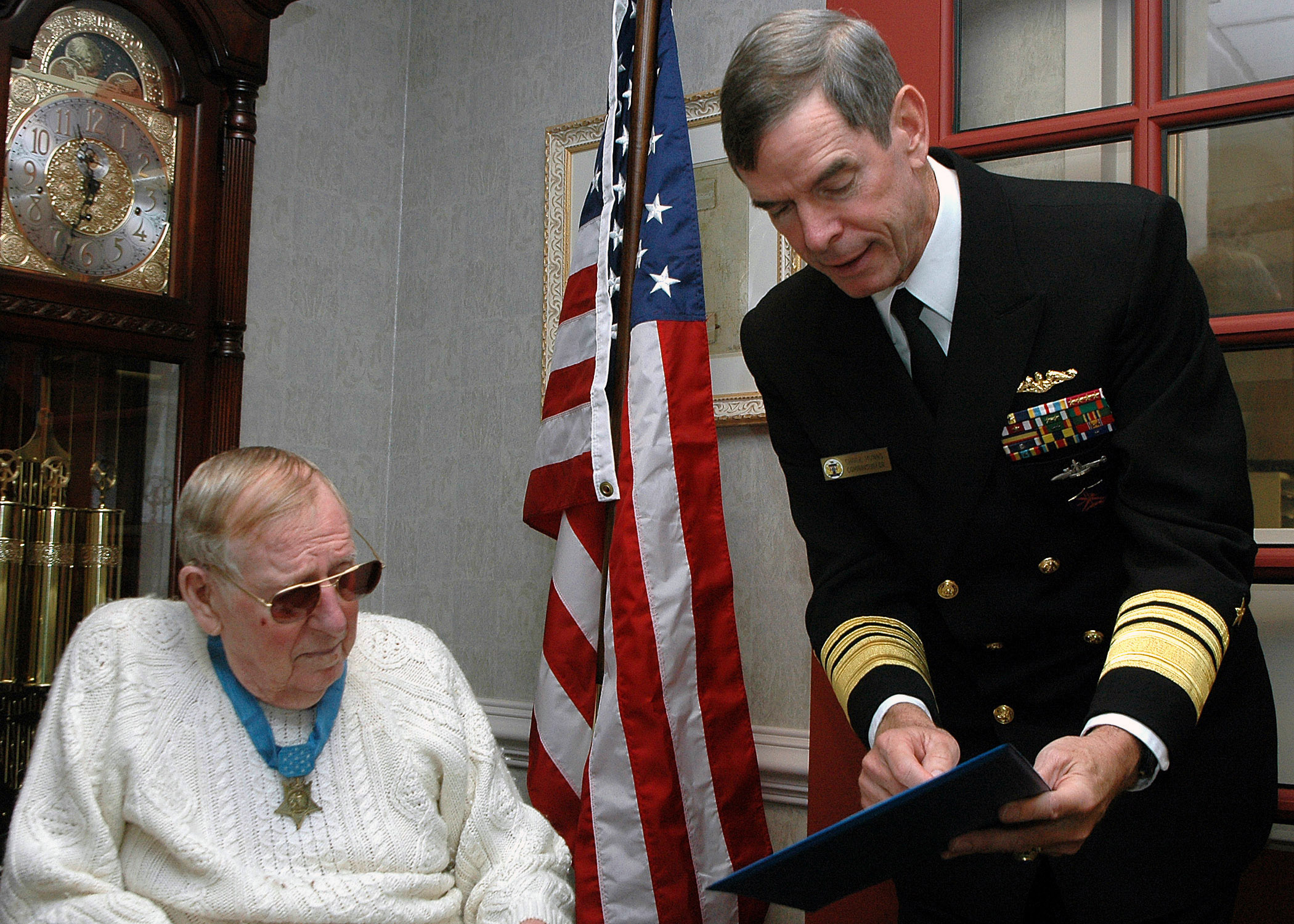
Fluckey, at left, being visited by Vice Admiral Charles Munns in 2006

After he retired from the Navy in 1972, he and his wife, Marjorie, started running an orphanage in Portugal in 1974. Marjorie died in 1979, after 42 years of marriage. He married his second wife, Margaret, in 1980 and they continued to run the orphanage together until it closed in 1982. He has one daughter, Barbara.

His book, Thunder Below! published in 1992, depicts the exploits of his beloved Barb. "Though the tally shows more shells, bombs, and depth charges fired at Barb, no one received the Purple Heart and Barb came back alive, eager, and ready to fight again."

Fluckey died at age 93, from complications of Alzheimer's disease, at Anne Arundel Medical Center in Annapolis, Maryland, on June 28, 2007. He is buried at the United States Naval Academy Cemetery.

== Military awards ==
Fluckey's military decorations and awards include:

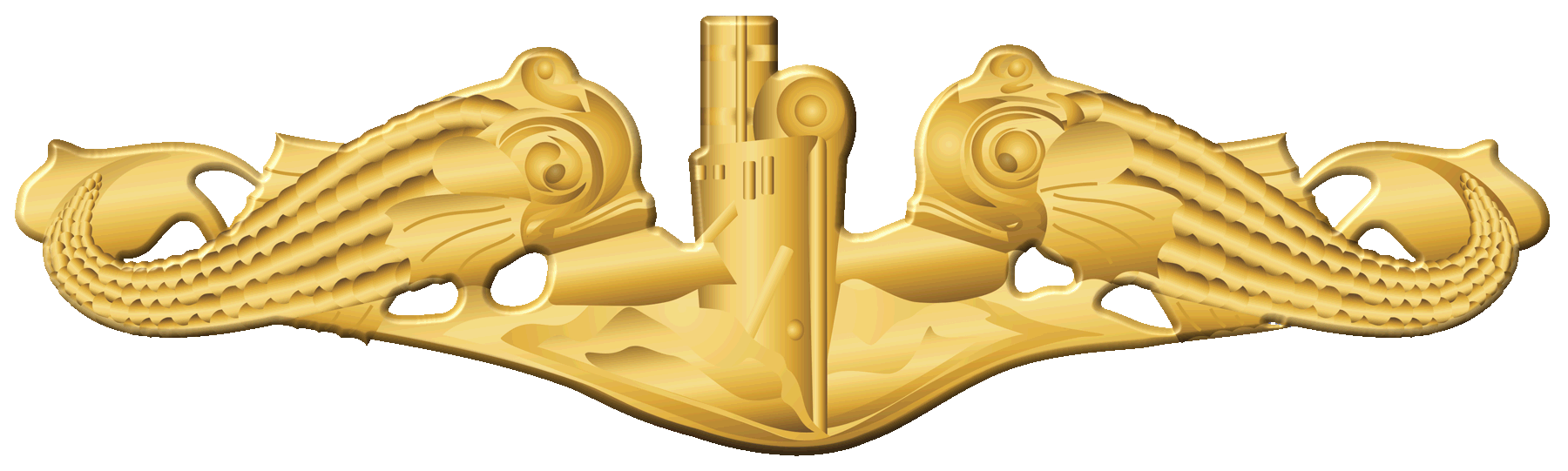

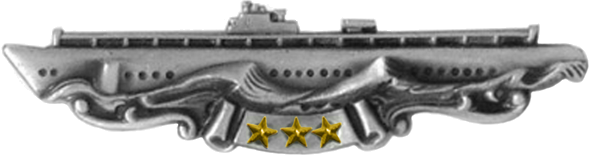

| Badge | Submarine Warfare Insignia | | |
| 1st row | Medal of Honor | | Navy Cross with 3 5/16 inch stars |
| 2nd row | Navy Distinguished Service Medal with 5/16 inch star | Legion of Merit with 5/16 inch star | Combat Action Ribbon Retroactively Awarded, 1999 |
| 3rd row | Presidential Unit Citation with 1 Service star | Navy Unit Commendation with 1 Service star | American Defense Service Medal with 'Fleet' clasp |
| 4th row | American Campaign Medal | Asiatic-Pacific Campaign Medal with 7 Campaign stars | World War II Victory Medal |
| 5th row | National Defense Service Medal with 1 Service star | Philippine Liberation Medal | Navy Pistol Marksmanship Medal |
| Badge | Submarine Combat Patrol Insignia | | |

=== Medal of Honor citation ===
For conspicuous gallantry and intrepidity at the risk of his life above and beyond the call of duty as commanding officer of the U.S.S. Barb during her 11th war patrol along the east coast of China from 19 December 1944 to 15 February 1945. After sinking a large enemy ammunition ship and damaging additional tonnage during a running 2-hour night battle on 8 January, Comdr. Fluckey, in an exceptional feat of brilliant deduction and bold tracking on 25 January, located a concentration of more than 30 enemy ships in the lower reaches of Nankuan Chiang (Mamkwan Harbor). Fully aware that a safe retirement would necessitate an hour's run at full speed through the uncharted, mined, and rock-obstructed waters, he bravely ordered, "Battle station — torpedoes!" In a daring penetration of the heavy enemy screen, and riding in 5 fathoms [9.1 m] of water, he launched the Barb's last forward torpedoes at 3,000 yards [2.7 km] range. Quickly bringing the ship's stern tubes to bear, he turned loose 4 more torpedoes into the enemy, obtaining 8 direct hits on 6 of the main targets to explode a large ammunition ship and cause inestimable damage by the resultant flying shells and other pyrotechnics. Clearing the treacherous area at high speed, he brought the Barb through to safety and 4 days later sank a large Japanese freighter to complete a record of heroic combat achievement, reflecting the highest credit upon Comdr. Fluckey, his gallant officers and men, and the U.S. Naval Service.

== Other honors ==
Fluckey was awarded Eagle Scout in 1948. He is one of only eleven known Eagle Scouts who also received the Medal of Honor. The others are Aquilla J. Dyess and Mitchell Paige of the U.S. Marine Corps; Robert Edward Femoyer and Jay Zeamer Jr. of the U.S. Army Air Forces; Leo K. Thorsness of the United States Air Force; Arlo L. Olson, Benjamin L. Salomon, and Walter Joseph Marm Jr. of the United States Army; and Britt K. Slabinski and Thomas R. Norris of the U.S. Navy.

He was an honorary companion of the Maryland Commandery of the Military Order of Foreign Wars.

His book Thunder Below! was winner of the 1993 Samuel Eliot Morison Award for Naval Literature. The Quarter Deck at Naval Submarine Base, Kings Bay, GA, Fluckey Hall, is named in his honor.

== See also ==
- List of Medal of Honor recipients
- List of Medal of Honor recipients for World War II
