= United States Pacific Fleet =

US Navy theater-level component command

- The seal of the Commander of the United States Pacific Fleet
- Founded: 1907; 119 years ago
- Country: United States
- Branch: United States Navy
- Type: Theater-level command
- Size: 250,000 Navy sailors and Marines; 2,000 aircraft 200 ships
- Part of: Pacific Command
- Garrison/HQ: Naval Station Pearl Harbor
- Engagements: World War II; Korean War; Second Taiwan Strait Crisis; Vietnam War; Third Taiwan Strait Crisis; Global War on Terrorism
- Website: cpf.navy.mil

Commanders
- Commander: ADM Stephen Koehler
- Deputy Commander: VADM Jeffrey Jablon
- Fleet Master Chief: FLTCM Donald L. Davis Jr.

The United States Pacific Fleet (USPACFLT) is a theater-level component command of the United States Navy, located in the Pacific Ocean. It provides naval forces to the Pacific Command. Fleet headquarters is at Joint Base Pearl Harbor–Hickam, Hawaii, with large secondary facilities at Naval Air Station North Island, California.

== Origins ==
A Pacific Fleet was created in 1907 when the Asiatic Squadron and the Pacific Squadron were combined. In 1910, the ships of the First Squadron were organized back into a separate Asiatic Fleet. The General Order 94 of 6 December 1922 organized the United States Fleet, with the Battle Force as the Pacific presence. Until May 1940, the Battle Force was stationed on the West Coast of the United States. Headquarters, battleships, aircraft carriers and heavy cruisers were stationed at San Pedro close to the Long Beach Naval Shipyard. Light cruisers, destroyers and submarines were stationed at San Diego.

During the summer of 1940, as part of the U.S. response to Japanese expansionism, the fleet was instructed to take an "advanced" position at Pearl Harbor, Hawaii. Admiral James O. Richardson, the fleet's commander, strongly opposed long-term basing at Pearl Harbor, feeling that it would leave the fleet vulnerable to Japanese attack, and personally protested the move in Washington, D.C. Political considerations were thought sufficiently important that he was relieved by Admiral Husband E. Kimmel, who was in command at the time of the attack on Pearl Harbor. The Pacific Fleet was formally recreated on 1 February 1941, when General Order 143 split the United States Fleet into separate Atlantic, Pacific, and Asiatic Fleets.

== Composition in December 1941 ==
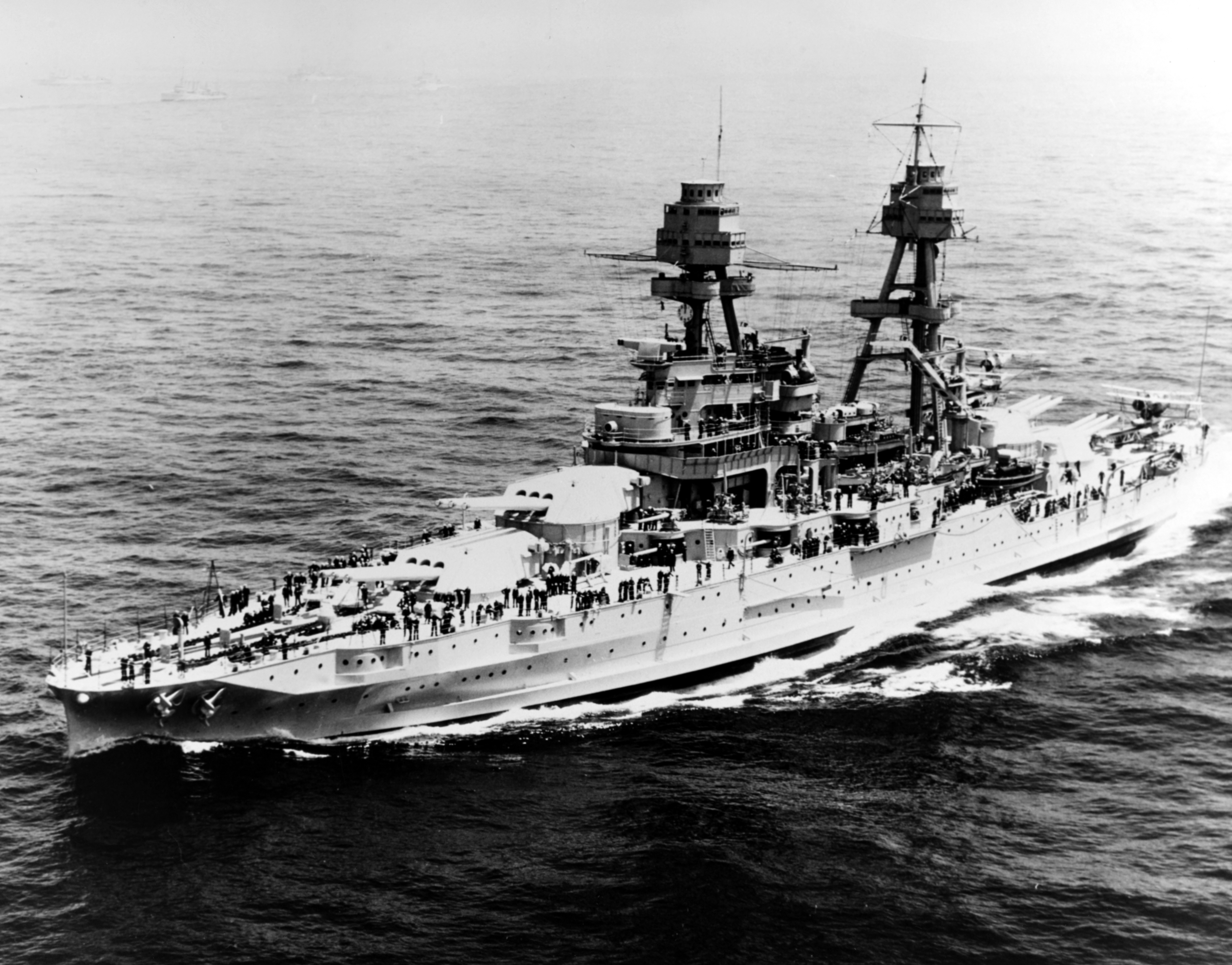
USS Pennsylvania

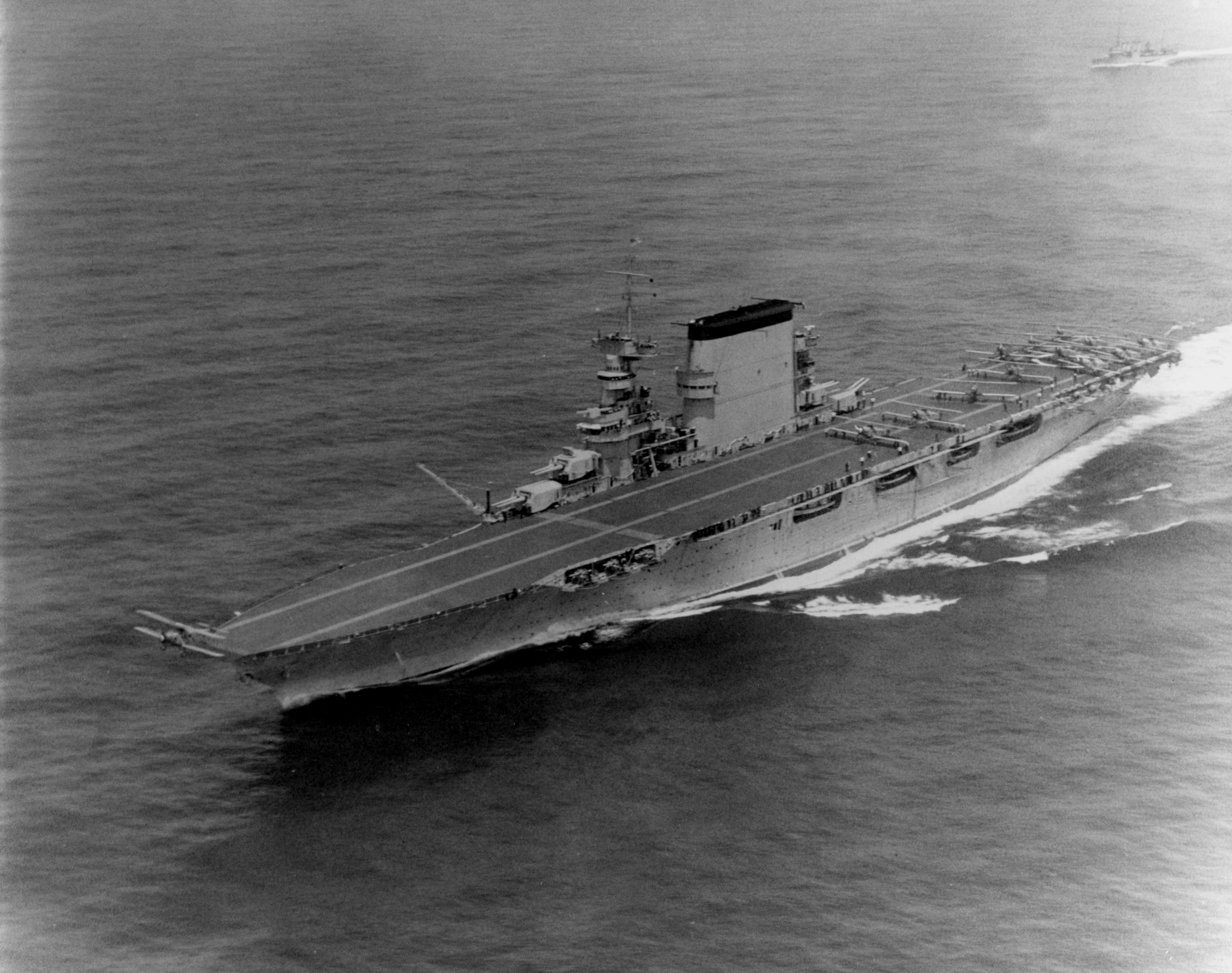
USS Lexington

On 7 December, the Fleet consisted of the Battle Force, Scouting Force, Base Force, Amphibious Force (ComPhibPac), Cruiser Force (COMCRUPAC), Destroyer Force (COMDESPAC), and the Submarine Force (COMSUBPAC). (Note: 7 December, ComSubPac was Admiral Thomas Withers Jr., who relieved Wilhelm L. Friedell that fall.) Also in Hawaii was the Fourteenth Naval District, commanded by Rear Admiral Claude C. Bloch.

- United States Pacific Fleet – Commander: Admiral Husband E. Kimmel (Flagship: USS Pennsylvania)
  - Fourteenth Naval District – Commander: Rear Admiral Claude C. Bloch (Note: The Fourteenth Naval District was an administrative organization responsible for communications and shore activities; its commander reported directly to the Navy Department rather than the commander of the Pacific Fleet.)
  - Battle Force, Pacific Fleet – Commander: Vice Admiral William S. Pye (Flagship: USS California)
    - Battleships, Battle Force (made up of three Battleship Divisions) – Commander: Rear Admiral Walter S. Anderson (Flagship: USS West Virginia)
    - Aircraft, Battle Force (made up of two Carrier Divisions) – Commander: Vice Admiral William F. Halsey Jr. (Flagship: USS Enterprise)
    - Cruisers, Battle Force (made up of two Cruiser Divisions) – Commander: Rear Admiral Herbert F. Leary (Flagship: USS Honolulu)
    - Destroyers, Battle Force (made up of two Destroyer Flotillas) – Commander: Rear Admiral Milo F. Draemel (Flagship: USS Detroit)
  - Scouting Force, Pacific Fleet – Commander: Vice Admiral Wilson Brown (Flagship: USS Indianapolis)
    - Cruisers, Scouting Force (made up of three Cruiser Divisions) – Commander: Rear Admiral John H. Newton (Flagship: USS Chicago)
    - Aircraft, Scouting Force (made up of three Patrol Wings) – Commander: Rear Admiral John S. McCain Sr. (Flagship: USS Wright)
    - Submarines, Scouting Force (made up of five Submarine Squadrons) – Commander: Rear Admiral Thomas Withers (Flagship: N/A)

§ = Divisional flagship

=== Battle Force, Pacific Fleet ===
==== Battleships, Battle Force ====
- Battleship Division 1 (Rear Admiral Isaac C. Kidd)
  - USS Pennsylvania
  - USS Arizona §
  - USS Nevada
- Battleship Division 2 (Rear Admiral David W. Bagley)
  - USS Tennessee §
  - USS California
  - USS Oklahoma
- Battleship Division 4 (Rear Admiral Walter S. Anderson)
  - USS Colorado
  - USS Maryland
  - USS West Virginia §

These nine battleships were intended to counterbalance the ten battleships of the Imperial Japanese Navy. At the time of the attack on Pearl Harbor, Pennsylvania was in dry dock undergoing maintenance, and Colorado was in the midst of a refit at Bremerton Navy Yard, Washington.

===== Aircraft, Battle Force =====
- Carrier Division 1 (Rear Admiral Aubrey W. Fitch)
  - USS Saratoga
  - USS Lexington §
- Carrier Division 2 (Vice Admiral William F. Halsey Jr.)
  - USS Enterprise §

When the attack took place, all three carriers were absent – Saratoga was in San Diego collecting her air group following a major refit, Enterprise was en route back to Hawaii following a mission to deliver aircraft to Wake Island, while Lexington had just departed on a similar mission to Midway.

===== Cruisers, Battle Force =====
- Cruiser Division 3 (Rear Admiral Abel T. Bidwell)
  - USS Trenton
  - USS Richmond
  - USS Concord §
- Cruiser Division 9 (Rear Admiral Herbert F. Leary)
  - USS Honolulu §
  - USS Boise
  - USS Phoenix
  - USS St. Louis
  - USS Helena

===== Destroyers, Battle Force =====
- Destroyer Flotilla One (Rear Admiral Robert A. Theobald)
  - Destroyer Squadron 1
  - Destroyer Squadron 3
  - Destroyer Squadron 5
- Destroyer Flotilla Two (Rear Admiral Milo F. Draemel)
  - Destroyer Squadron 4
  - Destroyer Squadron 6
  - Destroyer Division 50

== Scouting Force, Pacific Fleet ==
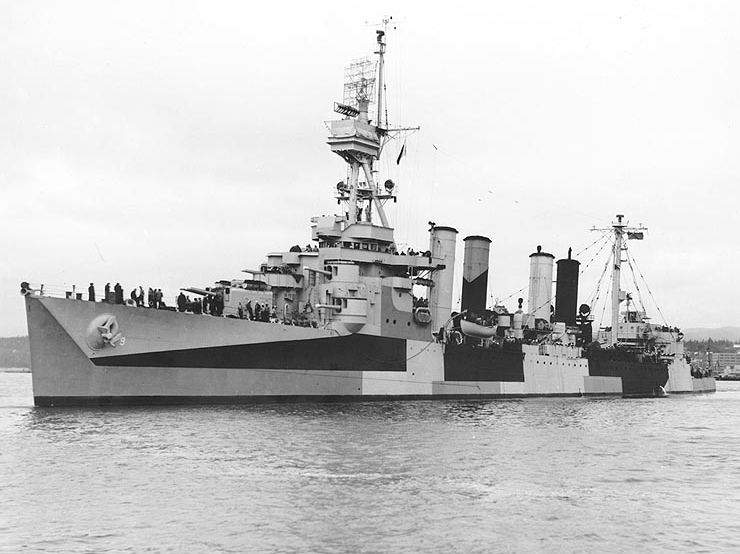
USS Richmond

=== Cruisers, Scouting Force ===
- Cruiser Division 4 (Rear Admiral John H. Newton)
  - USS Chicago §
  - USS Portland
  - USS Indianapolis
- Cruiser Division 5 (Rear Admiral Raymond A. Spruance)
  - USS Salt Lake City
  - USS Northampton §
  - USS Chester
- Cruiser Division 6 (Rear Admiral Frank J. Fletcher)
  - USS Astoria §
  - USS Minneapolis
  - USS New Orleans
  - USS San Francisco

=== Submarines, Scouting Force ===
- Submarine Squadron 2
  - Submarine Division 21
  - Submarine Division 22
- Submarine Squadron 4
  - Submarine Division 41
  - Submarine Division 42
  - Submarine Division 43
- Submarine Squadron 6
  - Submarine Division 61
  - Submarine Division 62
- Submarine Squadron 8
  - Submarine Division 81
  - Submarine Division 82
- Submarine Squadron 10
  - Submarine Division 101
  - Submarine Division 102

=== Aircraft, Scouting Force ===
- Patrol Wing 1
  - VP-11
  - VP-12
  - VP-14
- Patrol Wing 2
  - VP-21
  - VP-22
  - VP-23
  - VP-24
- Patrol Wing 4
  - VP-41
  - VP-42

=== Other elements ===
The Amphibious Force was formally known as Commander, Amphibious Forces, Pacific Fleet (ComPhibPac). On 7 December 1941 the Amphibious Force comprised the Army's 3rd Infantry Division at Fort Lewis, under Army operational control, the 2nd Marine Division, the 2nd Marine Aircraft Wing, the 2nd Defense Battalion (see Marine defense battalions), and a depot. One of PhibPac's subordinate commands during World War II was Transports, Amphibious Force, Pacific Fleet, or TransPhibPac. The commander of TransPhibPac was known as ComTransPhibPac. In addition to the ships assigned directly to the Pacific Fleet, Destroyer Division 80, consisting of the destroyers Schley, Chew, Ward and Allen, was assigned directly to the Fourteenth Naval District for the defence of the base and the fleet.

In December 1941, the fleet consisted of nine battleships, three aircraft carriers, 12 heavy cruisers, eight light cruisers, 50 destroyers, 33 submarines, and 100 patrol bombers. This was approximately the fleet's strength at the time of the Japanese attack on Pearl Harbor. That day, the Japanese Combined Fleet carried out the attack on Pearl Harbor, drawing the United States into World War II in the Pacific. The Pacific Fleet's Battle Line took the brunt of the attack, with two battleships destroyed, two salvageable but requiring lengthy reconstruction, and four more lightly to moderately damaged, forcing the U.S. Navy to rely primarily on aircraft carriers and submarines for many months afterward.

Subsequently, Pacific Fleet engagements during World War II included the Battle of Guam, the Marshalls-Gilberts raids, the Doolittle Raid, the Solomon Islands campaign, the Battle of the Coral Sea, the Battle of Midway, the Battle of the Eastern Solomons, the Battle of the Santa Cruz Islands, the Battle of the Philippine Sea, the Gilbert and Marshall Islands campaign, the Battle of Leyte Gulf, and the Battle of Okinawa. More minor battles included the Battle of Dutch Harbor. The Submarine Force began a sustained campaign of commerce raiding against Japan's merchant marine, beginning the first day of the war, which ultimately claimed 1,314 ships totalling about 5.3 million tons (by the imperfect postwar reckoning of the Joint Army-Navy Assessment Committee, JANAC). The West Loch disaster occurred at Pearl Harbor on 21 May 1944.

== Post-1945 ==
The Pacific Fleet took part in Operation Magic Carpet, the return of U.S. servicemen, after the end of the Second World War. The organization of the Pacific Fleet in January 1947 is shown in Hal M. Friedman's Arguing over the American Lake: Bureaucracy and Rivalry in the U.S. Pacific, 1945–1947.

Since 1950, the Pacific Fleet has been involved in the Korean War, the Vietnam War, the two Taiwan Straits Crises, and a number of other operations including the Mayaguez Incident of 1975, as well as post-Vietnam related operations such as Operation New Arrivals. The RIMPAC exercise series began in 1971.

On 7 March 1984, the Secretaries of Transportation and Navy signed a Memorandum of Agreement which created the Maritime Defense Zones (MDZ). The Pacific MDZ is an echelon three Navy command under the Commander U.S. Pacific Fleet. The Pacific MDZ has responsibility for coastal defense up to 200 nautical miles (370 km; 230 mi) around the U.S. West Coast, Aleutian Islands, and Hawaii during times of hostility. On 1 October 1990, Commander U.S. Naval Forces Alaska (COMUSNAVAK) was established as the Naval Component Commander to Commander, Alaskan Command (COMALCOM). Since its inception, COMUSNAVAK has grown to become responsible for coordinating all Navy activity in the Alaska and Aleutian area, for detailed planning and coordination for the Naval portion of the Joint and Combined Exercise Northern Edge, and coordinates high-visibility U.S. Navy ship visits throughout Alaska in support of public relations and recruiting initiatives.

The very large PACEX 89 in the North Pacific involved the USN, Canadian Navy, Japanese Maritime Self-Defence Force, and ROK Navy. At the end of Exercise PACEX '89 a 54-ship formation was assembled for photos. It included the flagship, USS Blue Ridge, the USS Enterprise Battle Group, the USS Carl Vinson Battle Group, two battleship surface action groups formed around USS New Jersey and USS Missouri, and a Japanese Maritime Self-Defence Force task force. Missouri and New Jersey performed a simultaneous gunfire demonstration for the aircraft carriers Enterprise and Nimitz during PACEX. The highlight of PacEx for Missouri was a port visit in Busan, Republic of Korea.

Other operations undertaken since include participation in the Alaskan Oil Spill Joint Task Force, including participation of Commander, Amphibious Group Three, as deputy CJTF. This was the defence response to the Exxon Valdez oil spill of March 1989.

Also, the Pacific Fleet was involved in "Classic Resolve" during the December 1989 Philippine coup attempt. Enterprise, CVW-11 and Battle Group FOXTROT joined forces with USS Midway (CV-41) and Battle Group ALPHA near Manila Bay. Operation Classic Resolve involved contingency operations, if necessary, to support U.S. interests following the Philippine coup attempt. Both battle groups were chopped to JTF Philippines. During the operations, the carriers maintained deck alerts and 24-hour coverage of Manila with E-2C aircraft. CVW-11 returned home through the Arabian Sea and the Atlantic Ocean, leaving its ship, the "Big E", in Norfolk, Virginia for refueling.

Around 10 September 1990, USS Princeton and USS Reuben James visited Vladivostok. This marked the first United States Navy visit to the Soviet Union's Pacific port of Vladivostok since before World War II. Before the visit was completed, the crew received word that their Pacific cruise was canceled. They returned to Long Beach and joined the USS Ranger Battle Group preparing to deploy to the Persian Gulf.

During Operation Fiery Vigil in June 1991, the following vessels and groups participated in the sealift phase of the evacuation: the Abraham Lincoln battle group (COMCARGRU 3 embarked): USS Abraham Lincoln, USS Long Beach, USS Lake Champlain, USS Merrill, USS Gary, USS Ingraham, USS Roanoke, Amphibious Ready Group Alpha (COMPHIBRON 3 embarked): USS Peleliu, USS Cleveland, USS Comstock, USS Bristol County, and a large number of other vessels: USS Midway, USS Curts, USS Rodney M. Davis, USS Thach, USS Arkansas, USS McClusky, USS St. Louis, USS San Bernardino, MV 1st Lt. Jack Lummus, MV American Condor, USS Niagara Falls, USNS Ponchatoula, USNS Passumpsic, USNS Hassayampa, USS Haleakala, USNS Spica, USS Cape Cod. (CNA, 1994, 113) Further operations included JTF Marianas (August–September 1992) and JTF Hawaii (September–October 1992).

Other contingency operation after 1991 included Operation Sea Angel (Bangladesh relief) (led by Commander III Marine Expeditionary Force), Operation Eastern Exit, and involvement in the Somali Civil War – 'Restore Hope'. During 'Restore Hope,' Navy command arrangements underwent a number of changes during the operation. At the start, the principal naval forces were the Ranger battle group (with Commander, Carrier Group One embarked on USS Ranger as Commander, Naval Forces), the Kitty Hawk battle group, an amphibious task unit including USS Tripoli, USS Juneau, USS Rushmore, and MV Lummus, and three ships from MPSRON TWO (MV Anderson, MV Bonnyman, and MV Phillips). Other events led to the departure of the carriers and, as a result, Commander, Naval Forces responsibilities devolved first to Commander, Carrier Group Three, on Kitty Hawk, and thence to Commander, Amphibious Group Three. Finally Commander, Amphibious Squadron 3 became COMNAVFOR on 15 January with the departure of COMPHIGRU THREE after the completion of the MPF offload. (CNA, 1994, 168)

In 1995, Pacific Fleet surface ships were reshuffled. Effective 1 October 1995, the U.S. Pacific Fleet's surface ships were to be reorganized into six core battle groups and eight destroyer squadrons. Permanent core battle groups were to include a battle group commander, aircraft carrier, carrier air wing and at least two cruisers.

- Commander Cruiser-Destroyer Group 1/USS Constellation Battle Group: USS Lake Erie and USS Chosin
- ComCruDesGru 3/USS Carl Vinson Battle Group: USS Shiloh, USS California and USS Arkansas
- ComCruDesGru 5/USS Kitty Hawk Battle Group: USS Cowpens and USS Antietam
- Commander Carrier Group 7 (ComCarGru 7)/USS Nimitz Battle Group: USS Port Royal and USS Lake Champlain
- ComCar Gru 3/USS Abraham Lincoln Battle Group: USS Princeton and USS Chancellorsville
- Commander Carrier Group Five/USS Independence Battle Group: USS Bunker Hill and USS Mobile Bay

Commander, Naval Surface Forces Pacific:

- Destroyer Squadron 1: USS Copeland, USS George Philip, USS John A. Moore, USS Lewis B. Puller, USS Mahlon S. Tisdale, USS Sides, USS Wadsworth and USS Reid
- Destroyer Squadron 5: USS Cushing, USS John S. McCain, USS Ingersoll, USS Crommelin, USS Reuben James
- Destroyer Squadron 7: USS Elliot, USS Curtis Wilbur, USS Merrill, USS John Paul Jones and USS Harry W. Hill
- Destroyer Squadron 9: USS Paul F. Foster, USS David R. Ray, USS Callaghan, USS Chandler, USS Ford and USS Ingraham
- Destroyer Squadron 15: USS Fife, USS Hewitt, USS O'Brien, USS Curts, USS McClusky, USS Rodney M. Davis and USS Thach
- Destroyer Squadron 21: USS Kinkaid, USS Stethem, USS Benfold, USS Valley Forge, USS Jarrett and USS Rentz
- Destroyer Squadron 23: USS Oldendorf, USS John Young, USS Fitzgerald, USS Vincennes, USS Gary and USS Vandegrift
- Destroyer Squadron 31: USS Fletcher, USS Leftwich, USS Halsey and USS Paul Hamilton

In 1996 two carrier battle groups were sent to the Taiwan area during the Third Taiwan Straits Crisis. Later ships of the Pacific Fleet, notably USS Mobile Bay, a Ticonderoga-class cruiser, provided support to the entry of INTERFET in East Timor in 1999.

Between 25 and 27 March 2006, Carrier Strike Group Nine participated in a series of anti-submarine warfare exercises (ASW) in Hawaiian waters while en route to the U.S. Seventh Fleet's area of responsibility. In addition to the strike group, the exercise also included the nuclear-powered attack submarines Seawolf, Cheyenne, Greeneville, Tucson, and Pasadena, as well as land-based P-3 Orion aircraft from Commander Patrol and Reconnaissance Wing 2 and associated patrol squadrons VP-4, VP-9, and VP-47.

As of 2011, the Pacific Fleet has authority over:

- numbered Third and Seventh Fleets
- Naval Air Force, Pacific
- Commander, Naval Surface Forces Pacific (Note: Commander, Naval Surface Forces, Pacific (COMNAVSURFPAC) is a post within the United States Pacific Fleet. As Naval Surface Forces, Pacific, it is a military formation, but the organization is often known as COMNAVSURFPAC. Its headquarters are on the West Coast of the United States.)
- Naval Submarine Force, Pacific
- Fleet Marine Force, Pacific

Naval shore commands over which USPACFLT has authority:

- Commander Naval Forces Korea
- Commander Naval Forces Japan
- Commander Naval Forces Marianas

== See also ==
- List of units of the United States Navy
- History of the United States Navy
- Military history of the United States
- Pacific Partnership
- United States Fleet Forces Command
- United States Seventh Fleet
