= SSN (novel) =

1996 novel by Tom Clancy

- First edition cover
- Author: Tom Clancy and Martin H. Greenberg
- Audio read by: Joe Morton; Boyd Gaines
- Language: English
- Genre: Techno-thriller; War novel; Military fiction
- Publisher: G.P. Putnam's Sons
- Publication date: December 1, 1996
- Publication place: United States
- Media type: Print (Paperback), Audio
- Pages: 336
- ISBN: 0425159116

SSN is a techno-thriller novel, created by Tom Clancy and Martin H. Greenberg and published on December 1, 1996, as a tie-in to the video game of the same name. It follows the missions of USS Cheyenne, a United States Navy nuclear attack submarine, during a fictional war between the United States and China over the Spratly Islands. The title references the U.S. Navy hull classification code for a nuclear-powered attack submarine. SSN is the second Clancy novel after Red Storm Rising (1986) that is not set in the Ryanverse.

The book also features the transcript of a discussion of the game with Clancy and former Royal Navy submarine commander Doug Littlejohns, which was held in Greek Island, a former government-owned fallout shelter located in West Virginia. The interview was originally released along with the CD-ROM of the game.

== Plot summaries ==
=== Preface: "Prelude to War" ===
In 1997, former Chinese Communist Party leader Deng Xiaoping dies, creating a power struggle within the Chinese government. Premier Li Peng later takes over in a coup d'etat and orders the arrest of his political rivals, particularly Deng's technical successor Jiang Zemin. He then orders an invasion of the Spratly Islands, where a large oil deposit was recently discovered by an American oil company. A Chinese Han-class submarine attacks the American aircraft carrier USS Nimitz, prompting one of her escort submarines to sink the Chinese sub in retaliation, killing everyone aboard. War between the two countries becomes imminent.

=== "First Blood" ===
USS Cheyenne, a Los Angeles-class submarine commanded by Captain Bartholomew Mackey, deploys from San Diego to Pearl Harbor to join the conflict in the South China Sea. Initially ordered to fire on any Chinese submarines only in self defense, Cheyenne encounters and later sinks a Han-class submarine when the latter fires first. With the war now underway, Mackey bears witness to the sinking of another enemy sub near Pearl Harbor.

=== "South China Sea Station" ===
Cheyenne is diverted from her initial destination in Pearl Harbor and is ordered to proceed to South China Sea and escort the aircraft carrier USS Independence. Along the way, she sinks a Chinese Luda-class destroyer and its escort Romeo-class submarine, which are in the area to lay mines and attack Independence. She additionally cripples a Chinese task group as well as another Romeo-class sub before meeting with Independence.

=== "Four if by Sea, Six if by Land" ===
Initially assigned as the advance escort for the Independence carrier group, Cheyenne receives orders to proceed to Spratly Islands and destroy a Chinese submarine base there. Along the way, it scores kills on another Luda-class destroyer and two more enemy subs.

=== "Dogfight" ===
Cheyenne meets up with the submarine tender USS McKee in Sulu Sea for supplies and debriefing. Its new orders are to sink any Chinese submarines and surface ships in contact. While managing to destroy one Han-class and three Kilo-class submarines, Mackey discovers the existence of a Russian Alfa-class submarine joining the Chinese.

=== "Interdiction" ===
Cheyenne is once again assigned to patrol duty on the Independence carrier group. Tasked to attack a Chinese surface task group from north of the Spratlys, Mackey prevents two Chinese-crewed Alfa-class submarines from attacking an American frigate USS Ingraham by sinking them. After successfully sinking the surface task group, it later fends off a Ming-class submarine from sinking McKee before meeting up with the latter.

=== "Ambush" ===
Cheyenne is tasked to patrol several abandoned oil rigs in the Spratlys. It destroys a Chinese submarine depot there, as well as a Kilo-class submarine.

=== "Target: Convoy" ===
Cheyenne is dispatched to cripple a Chinese merchant group entering the Spratlys from the mainland, later managing to evade an attacking Romeo-class submarine.

=== "Patrol" ===
Mackey is informed that the Chinese Navy is aware of his submarine's actions and is deploying all their ships to hunt down and sink Cheyenne. Additionally, Cheyenne is assigned to patrol routine in the Spratlys as well as to destroy Chinese airfields and runways with Tomahawk missiles near the Philippine island of Palawan. Mackey later scores kills on three Chinese-crewed Alfa-class submarines.

=== "The Fourth Patrol: From Russia with Love" ===
After completing its patrol duties, Cheyenne makes a quick stop at the former United States military base in Subic Bay, Philippines. After undergoing weapons replenishment from McKee and maintenance through the floating dry dock Arco, the submarine is assigned to sink six Akula-class submarines with experienced Russian personnel embedded within the Chinese crews before they reach the Paracel Islands north of Spratlys.

=== "Rescue" ===
A SEAL Team One unit recaptures the American oil drillship Benthic Adventure from the Chinese in the Spratlys. With the ship now being escorted by the Independence carrier battle group to safety, Cheyenne is assigned to join the convoy and protect the ship from any Chinese submarines in the area. Along with the Independence carrier group, they later ward off several attacking Chinese vessels intent on sinking Benthic Adventure.

=== "Battle Royale" ===
After failing to recapture Benthic Adventure, the Chinese Navy sends over sixty ships and submarines from the mainland to attack the Independence carrier battle group. Cheyenne takes part in sinking most of the Chinese fleet.

=== "Strait Up" ===
Former Chinese leader Zemin resurfaces in Taiwan, having been smuggled out of China by USS Seawolf. Cheyenne is assigned to reconnoiter the mine-infested Formosa Strait in order to find a safe passage for the deposed Chinese premier's eventual return to the mainland. Mackey scores kills on a Kilo-class submarine and two Luda-class destroyers.

=== "Typhoon Hunt" ===
Cheyenne is deployed to sink a Russian-crewed Typhoon-class submarine operating in the South China Sea, along with its Akula-class escorts. In the ensuing attack, one remaining Akula-class submarine manages to escape.

=== "Hornets' Nest" ===
Cheyenne continues patrolling the eastern side of Taiwan to "sanitize" the area of enemy submarines. Surviving an ambush, she scores kills on five Akula-class submarines (including one that had escaped earlier) and two Kilo-class submarines.

=== "Special Delivery" ===
Cheyenne is tasked with transporting Zemin to mainland China to negotiate a ceasefire to the ongoing conflict with Chinese Premier Peng. It manages to sink the Sino-Russian next-generation nuclear attack submarine Mao, which has been aggressively pursuing Cheyenne. After Zemin retakes his position as General Secretary of the Chinese Communist Party, he declares a ceasefire ending the war in the South China Sea. Mackey is later honored by the Chinese and American governments.

== Reception ==
The book debuted at number 63 on the USA Today's Best-selling Books list for the week of November 28, 1996, and peaked at number 10.
