= Tom Clancy's SSN =

1996 video game

Tom Clancy SSN
- Developers: Virtus Corporation; Clancy Interactive
- Publisher: Simon & Schuster Interactive
- Designer: Juan Benito
- Platform: Microsoft Windows
- Release: November 18, 1996
- Genre: Submarine simulator
- Mode: Single-player

Tom Clancy SSN is a 1996 submarine simulator of the 688i (Improved Los Angeles-class nuclear hunter/killer submarine) released on Microsoft Windows. The player is in command of USS Cheyenne in a limited war against China over the Spratly Islands. The gameplay is limited to a 15-mission single-player campaign in which the player carries out anti-submarine, anti-surface ship roles, intelligence gathering activities, and the launch of submarine based cruise missiles. Tom Clancy also wrote a book by the same name as a tie-in.

SSN is also the title of a board wargame published by Game Designer's Workshop in 1975, and was the first attempt at a serious modern submarine and anti-submarine warfare simulation game published for the entertainment market. It was designed by Stephen Newberg and developed by Marc Miller.

== Gameplay ==
Tom Clancy SSN uses video briefings and fictional news reports to enhance the atmosphere both before and after missions. The view during gameplay is from the perspective of an external trailing rotatable camera. In the game player weapons are limited to submarine-launched torpedoes, with a VLS system for launching Tomahawk missiles at off-map targets (as a mission objective). The player is provided with a simplified scanning screen display for sonar. Thermoclines at various depths are simulated as well, affecting sonar readings and accuracy. Commands are limited to directional steering, ballast tank and periscope controls, basic sonar functions, and weapons targeting and firing, providing an arcade like feel to the game play, as opposed to a true submarine command simulation.

== Plot ==
In the near future of 1997, the fragile power balance in China collapses as the death of Deng Xiaoping sparks a coup led by Premier Li Peng. In his bid to seize control, Li Peng seeks to capitalize on newly discovered oil deposits in the Spratly Islands by ordering an invasion. This act ignites a chain reaction: a Chinese submarine attacks a U.S. aircraft carrier escort, which retaliates, destroying the attacker, irreversibly heralding the onset of fully scaled war.

The U.S. response involves dispatching a state-of-the-art Los Angeles class attack submarine, USS Cheyenne (SSN‑773), under the command of Captain Bartholomew "Mack" Mackey. Departing from San Diego, Cheyenne receives orders to sail via Pearl Harbor before entering the hostile waters of the South China Sea. At first, the crew operates under strict defensive orders, permitted to engage only if fired upon. However, this restraint soon shatters when a Chinese sub fires, prompting Cheyenne to respond with lethal force.

As Cheyenne goes near the conflict zone, she joins the USS Independence carrier group as an escort and on the way, she engages and sinks a Chinese Luda‑class destroyer, its escort, as well as multiple submarines, including Romeo-class threats. While continuing to protect the battle group, the submarine’s missions escalate as Cheyenne ventures into the Spratlys, tasked with destroying a Chinese submarine base and engaging numerous surface and underwater threats. During these operations, Cheyenne sinks additional Luda destroyers, Romeo‑class subs, and even a Han‑class vessel, uncovering evidence of Russian involvement within Chinese forces.

The theatre of war intensifies as Cheyenne executes patrol duties, launches Tomahawk strikes on coastal airfields, and defends an American oil rig called Benthic Adventure, now under attack. This period sees the sub fend off multiple waves of Chinese naval aggression, including a massive task force threatening the carrier group.

Amid escalating conflict, the submarine makes logistics stops, including at Subic Bay, before launching strikes on Russian-crewed subs embedded in Chinese forces. The mission then pivots to facilitating the safe return of deposed Chinese leader Jiang Zemin, who resurfaces in Taiwan. Cheyenne enters the mine-infested Formosa Strait, defending Jiang’s convoy from further threats.

The culminating confrontation unfolds when Cheyenne hunts down a Russian Typhoon-class SSBN, supported by Akula escorts, in a high-stakes mission to preempt a nuclear threat. Emerging victorious, Cheyenne presses on, clearing enemy submarines surrounding Taiwan and ensuring Jiang's safe passage back to mainland China. In a final act of diplomacy, Jiang declares a ceasefire, effectively bringing the war in the South China Sea to an end. Captain Mackey’s crew earns commendations from both American and Chinese authorities.

== Development ==
Tom Clancy SSN was a joint venture of Simon & Schuster Interactive, Virtus Corp., and Clancy Interactive Entertainment, a company Clancy formed to translate his concepts into multimedia products.

== Reception ==
Reception

Aggregate score
Aggregator	Score
Metacritic	6.0

Tom Clancy SSN received "mixed or average" review according to review aggregator website, Metacritic.

A retrospective review from CD‑ROM Fossil portrayed the game as a curious novelty marred by “clunky, restrictive gameplay.” Although the video segments and acting were recognized for their nostalgic charm, the gameplay itself was deemed unrewarding.

Subsim reviewed Tom Clancy SSN and said it was more critical, characterizing the game as more akin to an “interactive movie” or “flight simulator for submarines” and noting that technical fans of the genre would find it lacking. The review gave it a rating of 52, indicating significant shortcomings in terms of realism and despite the elements of entertainment value.
