= USS Greeneville =

US Navy submarine

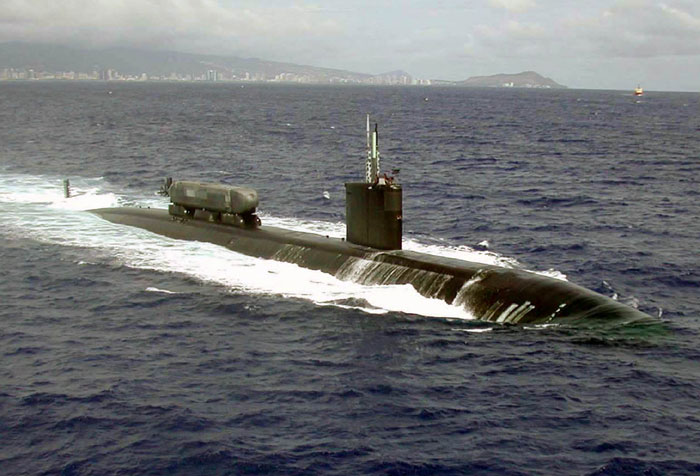
- USS Greeneville (SSN-772) off the coast of Honolulu, Hawaii carrying the ASDS.

History

United States
- Name: USS Greeneville
- Namesake: Greeneville, Tennessee
- Ordered: 14 December 1988
- Builder: Newport News Shipbuilding
- Laid down: 28 February 1992
- Launched: 17 September 1994
- Sponsored by: Tipper Gore
- Commissioned: 16 February 1996
- Home port: Point Loma, San Diego
- Motto: Volunteers Defending Frontiers
- Status: In active service
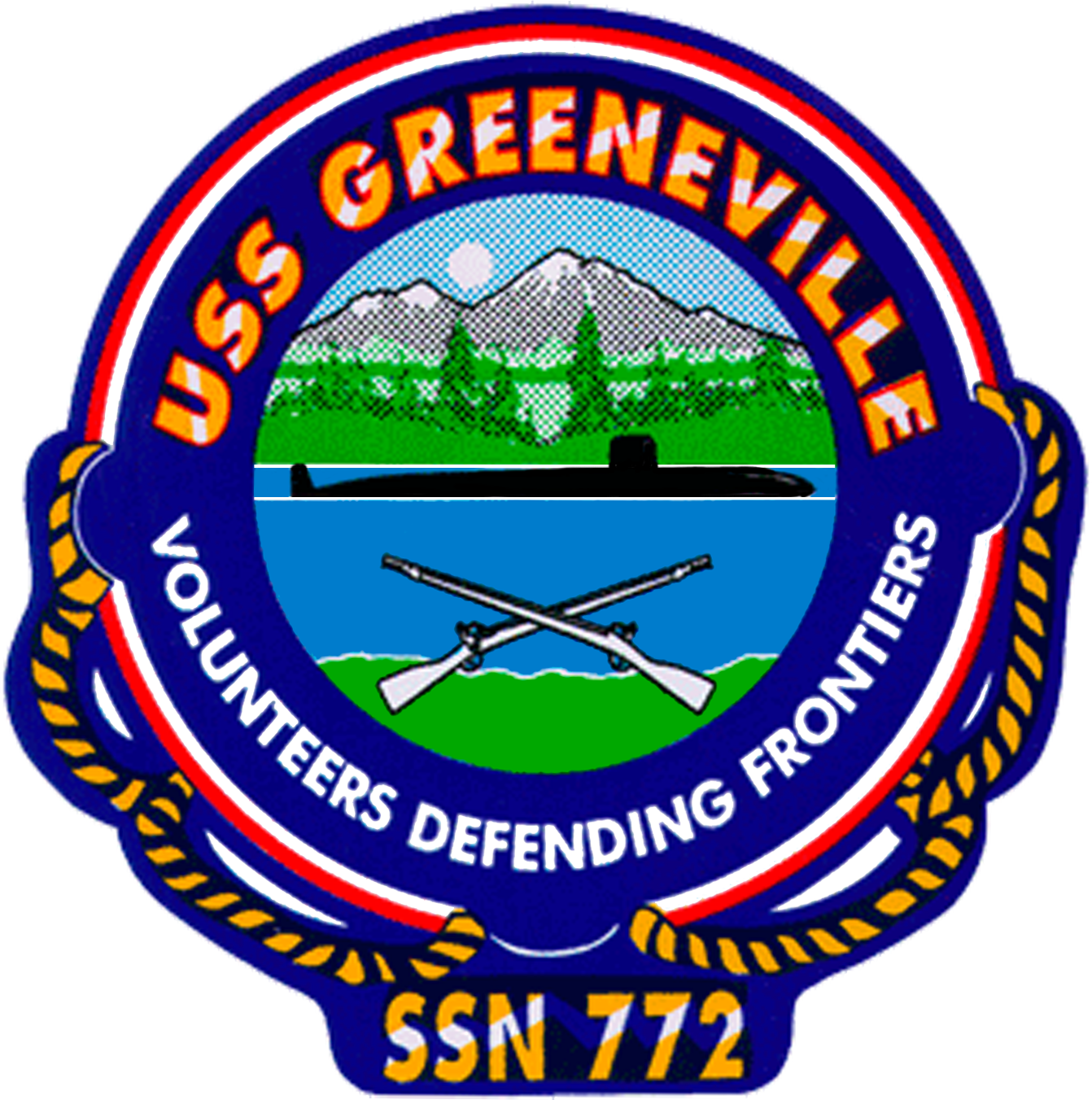
- Badge

General characteristics
- Class & type: Los Angeles-class submarine
- Displacement: 6,000 long tons (6,096 t) light; 6,927 long tons (7,038 t) full; 927 long tons (942 t) dead
- Length: 362 ft (110 m)
- Beam: 33 ft (10 m)
- Draft: 31 ft (9.4 m)
- Propulsion: 1 × S6G PWR nuclear reactor with D2W core (165 MW), HEU 93.5%; 2 × steam turbines (33,500) shp; 1 × shaft; 1 × secondary propulsion motor 325 hp (242 kW)
- Complement: 12 officers, 98 men
- Armament: 4 × 21 in (533 mm) torpedo tubes; 12 × vertical launch Tomahawk missiles

USS Greeneville (SSN-772) is a Los Angeles-class nuclear-powered attack submarine named after Greeneville, Tennessee. The contract to build the ship was awarded to Newport News Shipbuilding and Dry Dock Company in Newport News, Virginia, on 14 December 1988, its keel was laid down on 28 February 1992. The submarine was launched on 17 September 1994, sponsored by Tipper Gore, and commissioned on 16 February 1996.

The Greeneville had a deadly collision with the Japanese fishing vessel Ehime Maru off the coast of Oahu in February 2001.

== Namesake ==
The USS Greeneville was named after Greeneville, Tennessee, home of President Andrew Johnson, after local residents, government officials, and businesses such as Greeneville Metal Manufacturing (which builds submarine components) began a campaign for a submarine to be named after their town.

== Boat's history ==
=== Ehime Maru incident ===
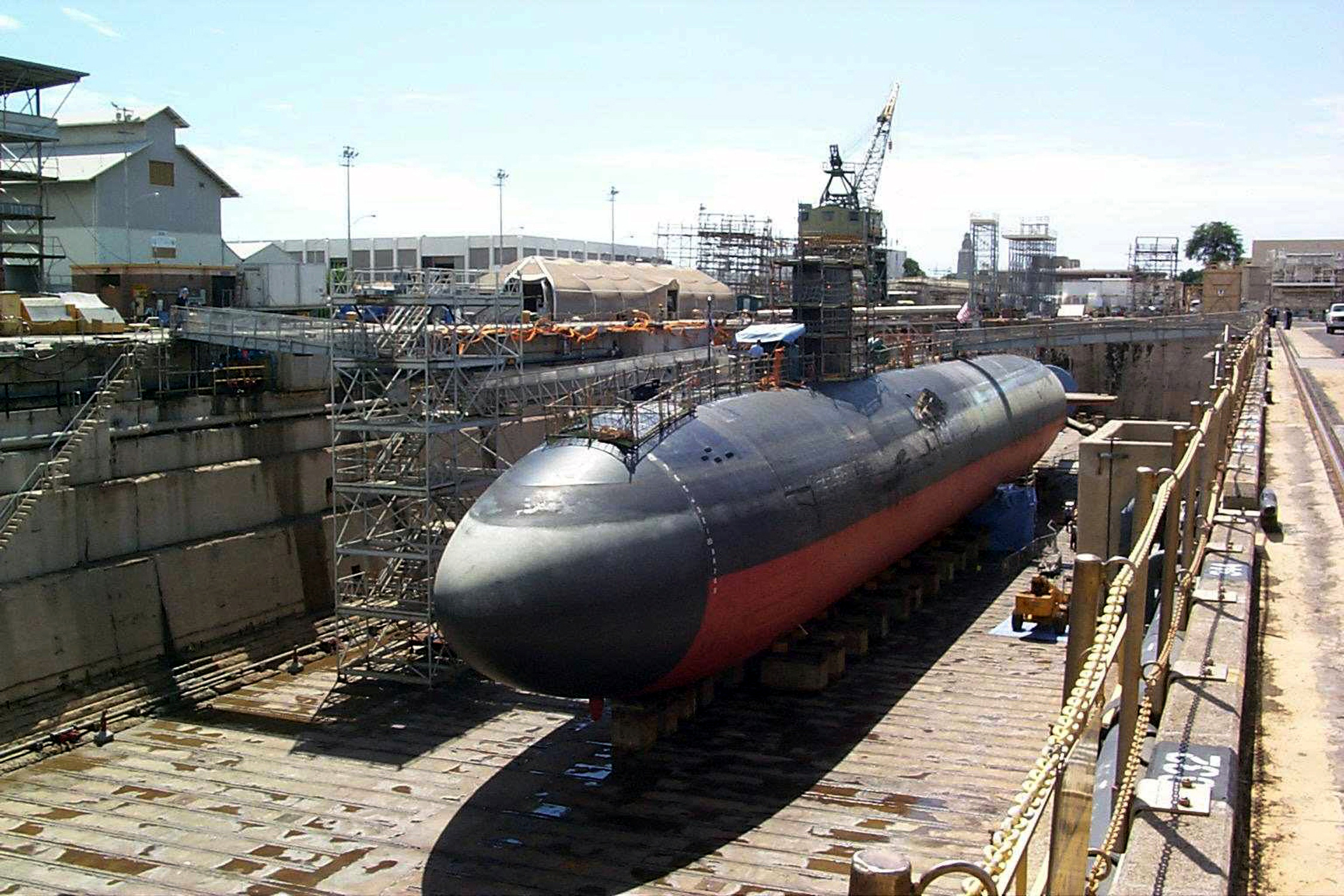
USS Greeneville at a Hawaiian dry dock in February 2001, following collision.

On 9 February 2001, while conducting a main ballast tank blow off the coast of Oahu and hosting several civilians, the Greeneville struck the 191-foot (58 m) Japanese fishery high school training ship Ehime Maru (えひめ丸). This caused the fishing boat to sink in less than ten minutes, leading to the death of nine people: three crew members, four students, and two teachers. The commander of the Greeneville, Commander Scott Waddle, accepted full responsibility for the incident. However, after he faced a court of inquiry, it was decided a full court-martial would be unnecessary, opting for a non-judicial punishment and administrative disciplinary action to the captain and some crew members. Commander Waddle's request to retire was approved for 1 October 2001 with an honorable discharge.

=== Saipan incident ===
On 27 August 2001, the Greeneville ran aground while entering port in Saipan on a routine Western Pacific deployment. The boat's underside, rudder, and propulsion train suffered minor damage. Repairs required dry docking and a significant delay in the remainder of her deployment. The boat's commanding officer, Commander David Bogdan, was relieved of command, and the navigator and assistant navigator were also removed from their duties. In addition, the navigator and the sub's executive officer, Lieutenant Commander Gerald Pfeifer, were found guilty of "hazarding a vessel" during an admiral's mast, conducted by Rear Admiral Joseph Enright, Commander, Submarine Group Seven.

=== USS Ogden collision ===
On 27 January 2002, less than a year after colliding with Ehime Maru and five months after running aground, the Greeneville collided with USS Ogden (LPD-5) during a personnel transfer off the coast of Oman, opening a 5 by 18 inch (130 by 460 mm) hole in one of Ogden's fuel tanks and spilling several thousand gallons of fuel. After the collision, both vessels left the area under their own power.

=== Post-2002 service ===
Following the investigation regarding the collision with Ogden, Commander Lindsay R. Hankins was permitted to remain in command of the Greeneville. Despite the fact the Ogden's commanding officer was fired, Hankins went on a command tour with XO LCDR Mark D. Pyle. Capt. Hankins went on to be awarded the Vice Admiral James Bond Stockdale Award for Inspirational Leadership. LCDR Pyle also went on to receive the John Paul Jones award, which recognizes outstanding leadership.

On 9 July 2004, when Commander Lorin Selby relieved Hankins as commanding officer of the Greeneville, Captain Cecil Haney, Commodore, Submarine Squadron One, stated that "The performance of USS Greeneville during Captain Hankins' tour has been nothing but remarkable. It has been marked by top grades in both tactical and engineering readiness. Lee Hankins was handpicked by our leadership for the job as CO of the Greeneville. They got it right." Hankins was selected for promotion to captain in 2005 and served as Commodore of Submarine Squadron One (COMSUBRON 1) based in Pearl Harbor, Hawaii. Captain Hankins later served as the Chief of Staff for the Commander, Submarine Forces Pacific.

Between 25 and 27 March 2006, a series of anti-submarine warfare exercises were held in Hawaiian waters that included the Greeneville; Carrier Strike Group Nine; the nuclear-powered attack submarines Seawolf, Cheyenne, Tucson, and Pasadena, as well as land-based P-3 Orion aircraft from patrol squadrons VP-4, VP-9, and VP-47.

In October 2007, the Greeneville left her home port of Pearl Harbor to conduct a Depot Modernization Period at Portsmouth Naval Shipyard in Kittery, ME. She returned to Pearl Harbor, HI in July 2009. In early 2011, the Greeneville returned from a Western Pacific deployment under the command of CDR Carullo.

== Awards ==
Awarded the 2016 "Battle E" award from Submarine Squadron One after a successful western Pacific deployment.

== See also ==
- Major submarine incidents since 2000
