= USS Cheyenne (SSN-773) =

Los Angeles-class nuclear-powered attack submarine of the US Navy

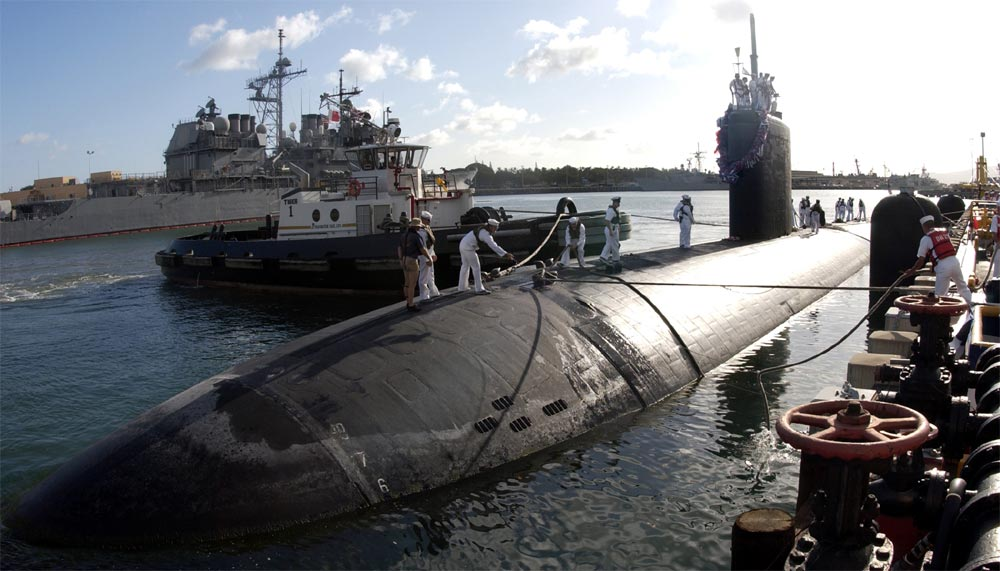
- USS Cheyenne pulling into port at Hawaii's Pearl Harbor in April 2003.

History

United States
- Name: Cheyenne
- Namesake: City of Cheyenne
- Awarded: 28 November 1989
- Builder: Newport News Shipbuilding and Drydock Company
- Laid down: 6 July 1992
- Launched: 16 April 1995
- Sponsored by: Mrs. Ann Simpson, wife of Wyoming Senator Alan K. Simpson
- Christened: 1 April 1995
- Commissioned: 13 September 1996
- Home port: PNSY
- Status: in active service
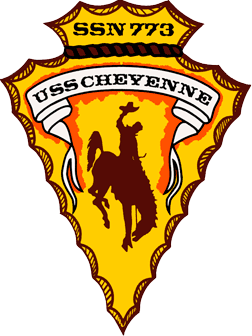
- Badge

General characteristics
- Class & type: Los Angeles-class submarine
- Displacement: 6,000 long tons (6,096 t) light; 6,927 long tons (7,038 t) full; 927 long tons (942 t) dead
- Length: 110.3 m (361 ft 11 in)
- Beam: 10 m (32 ft 10 in)
- Draft: 9.4 m (30 ft 10 in)
- Propulsion: 1 × S6G PWR nuclear reactor with D2W core (165 MW), HEU 93.5%; 2 × steam turbines (33,500) shp; 1 × shaft; 1 × secondary propulsion motor 325 hp (242 kW)
- Speed: 25 knots (46 km/h; 29 mph)+
- Test depth: 800 ft (244 m)+
- Complement: 12 officers, 98 men
- Armament: 4 × 21 in (533 mm) torpedo tubes; 12 × vertical launch Tomahawk missiles

USS Cheyenne (SSN-773), the final Los Angeles-class submarine, is the third ship of the United States Navy to be named for Cheyenne, Wyoming. The contract to build her was awarded to Newport News Shipbuilding and Dry Dock Company in Newport News, Virginia on 28 November 1989 and her keel was laid down on 6 July 1992. She was christened on 1 April 1995, sponsored by Mrs. Ann Simpson, wife of Wyoming Senator Alan K. Simpson, launched 16 April 1995, and commissioned on 13 September 1996, with Commander Peter H. Ozimik in command. Her motto is "Ride the Legend", similar to the slogan "Live the Legend" used by the city of Cheyenne. Cheyenne transferred to her homeport of Pearl Harbor, Hawaii, in 1998.

Cheyenne was the first ship to launch Tomahawk missiles in Operation Iraqi Freedom under the command of CDR Charles Doty. Cheyenne would go on to successfully launch her entire complement of Tomahawks, earning a "clean sweep" for combat actions in the final three months of a nine-month deployment. This dubbed her "First To Strike".

USS Cheyenne was the final Los Angeles–class submarine built. Following the construction of USS Cheyenne, Newport News began preparation for construction of the Virginia-class submarine.

== History ==
Between 25 and 27 March 2006, a series of anti-submarine warfare exercises were held in Hawaiian waters that included USS Cheyenne; Carrier Strike Group Nine, the nuclear-powered attack submarines Seawolf, Greeneville, Tucson, and Pasadena, as well as land-based P-3 Orion aircraft from patrol squadrons VP-4, VP-9, and VP-47. Cheyenne deployed to the western Pacific in 2015-16, and earned the Battle Efficiency “E” award. She visited Busan, South Korea on deployment in 2017, and participated in the biennial Keen Sword exercise with the Japan Self-Defense Forces while on deployment in 2019. In 2020, she deployed to the Indo-Pacific for the last time from Pearl Harbor.

In June 2021, Cheyenne shifted her homeport from Pearl Harbor to Groton, CT, joining Submarine Squadron (SUBRON) 12. Cheyenne moved to Naval Submarine Base New London in order to prepare for upcoming refueling and maintenance intended to extend the service life of the submarine by 10 years.

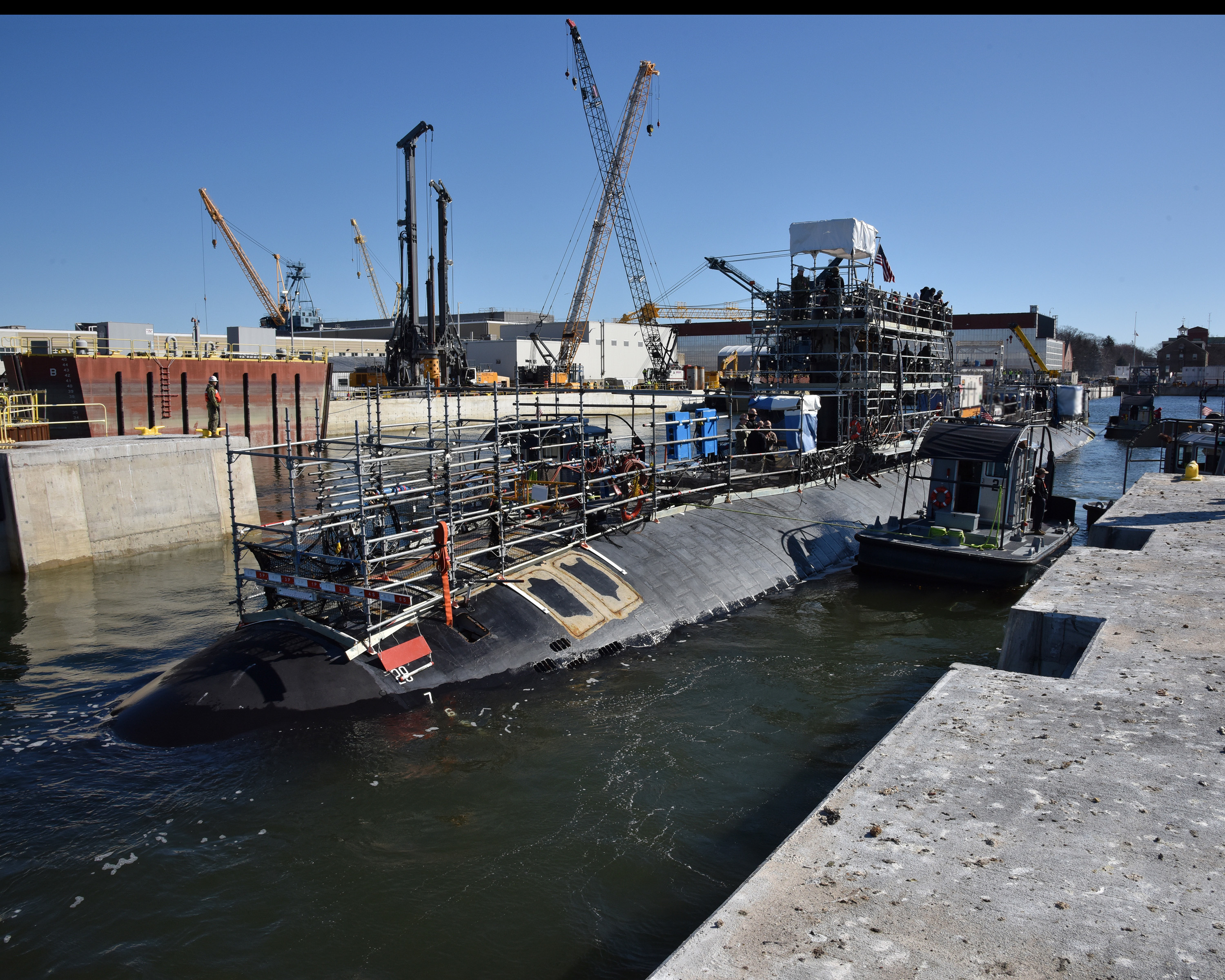
USS Cheyenne enters the new Super Flood Bason for Portsmouth Naval Shipyard’s Dry Dock 1

Cheyenne arrived in November 2021 at Portsmouth Naval Shipyard in Kittery, Maine to begin a service-life extension program (SLEP) then expected to take 30 months and cost $315 million. In December 2021, Submarine Squadron 2 was re-established at Portsmouth Naval Shipyard and Cheyenne was transferred to this new command. Cheyenne is the first of an anticipated seven Los Angeles-class subs to undergo this SLEP and was also the first vessel in April 2022 to dock in Portsmouth Naval Shipyard's newly improved Dry Dock 1 using the Super Flood Basin.

On February 10, 2025 Fleet Forces Command announced that Cheyenne had reached a major milestone in her SLEP refit. With her reactor refueling, external hull refitting, major external repairs, structural inspections, and replacements of external mechanical and electrical systems complete, Cheyenne was successfully launched from drydock and put back to sea on February 6. Commander Mark Rostedt relieved Kyle Calton as commanding officer on July 11, 2025. Cheyenne departed Portsmouth for sea trials December 12, 2025 and she returned December 21.

On December 23, 2025 the U.S. Department of War announced that Portsmouth Naval Shipyard had successfully completed the SLEP refueling overhaul for U.S.S. Cheyenne, marking the first submarine to undergo an SLEP overhaul. This overhaul is expected to extend Cheyenne's service life beyond 44 years. The SLEP program has selected an additional five Los-Angeles class boats as strong candidates for SLEP, contingent on budget approval in FY2026, in order to fill the readiness gaps created by construction delays for the Block IV and Block V Virginia-class boats that were slated to replace the last of the Los Angeles-class boats. In addition to the complex and hazardous task of refueling Cheyenne's reactor, the boat also underwent hull preservation, propulsion plant modernization, sonar and combat system upgrades, and habitability improvements. This included integrating the latest AN/BQQ-10 sonar processing systems and AN/BYG-1 combat control suites used on Virginia-class boats with Cheyenne's systems, aligning her sensor and weapons capabilities with the most modern platforms in the fleet.

== In popular culture ==
- Cheyenne is the primary subject of the book SSN by Tom Clancy, battling the People's Liberation Army Navy in a fictional war over the Spratly Islands. She is also featured in the video game by Tom Clancy called SSN.
- In the 2000 novel Quicksilver by Judith and Garfield Reeves-Stevens, Cheyenne was ordered to fire a Tomahawk TLAM Block Four cruise missile, under manual control of Weapons Officer Lt. Miken Marano, at the River Entrance of the Pentagon.
- In To the Death by Patrick Robinson, Cheyenne is tasked with shadowing an Iranian Kilo on a path through the Mediterranean Sea.
- Cheyenne plays a major role in the thriller novel Code Zero written by Brad Thor with Ward Larsen, racing the People's Liberation Army Navy and the Russian Navy to the remains of a downed commercial airliner in the Arctic Ocean.
- In the ninth part of JoJo's Bizarre Adventure, The JoJoLands Cheyenne is depicted launching a surveillance drone to track Jodio's group in the submersible.
