= VP-9 =

Patrol Squadron 9
- Active: 15 March 1951 – present
- Country: United States
- Branch: United States Navy
- Type: Patrol squadron
- Garrison/HQ: Naval Air Station Whidbey Island
- Nickname(s): Golden Eagles
- Engagements: Korean War; Vietnam War

Aircraft flown
- Patrol: P4Y-2/2S; P-2V-2/7/SP-2H; P-3A/B/C; P-8A

Patrol Squadron 9 (VP-9) is a U.S. Navy patrol squadron with its homeport located at Naval Air Station Whidbey Island. As of 2018, VP-9 is part of Patrol and Reconnaissance Wing Ten, Commander, Naval Air Forces, Pacific.

The squadron was established on 15 March 1951. It is the second squadron to be designated VP-9, the first VP-9 was redesignated VP-12 on 1 July 1939.

== Operational history ==
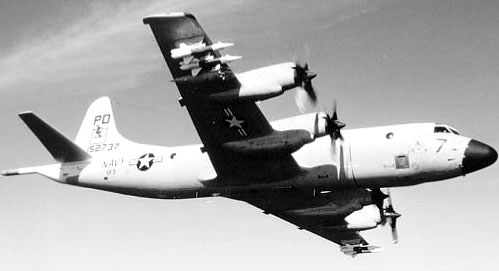
VP-9 P-3B with AGM-12 Bullpup missiles in 1969

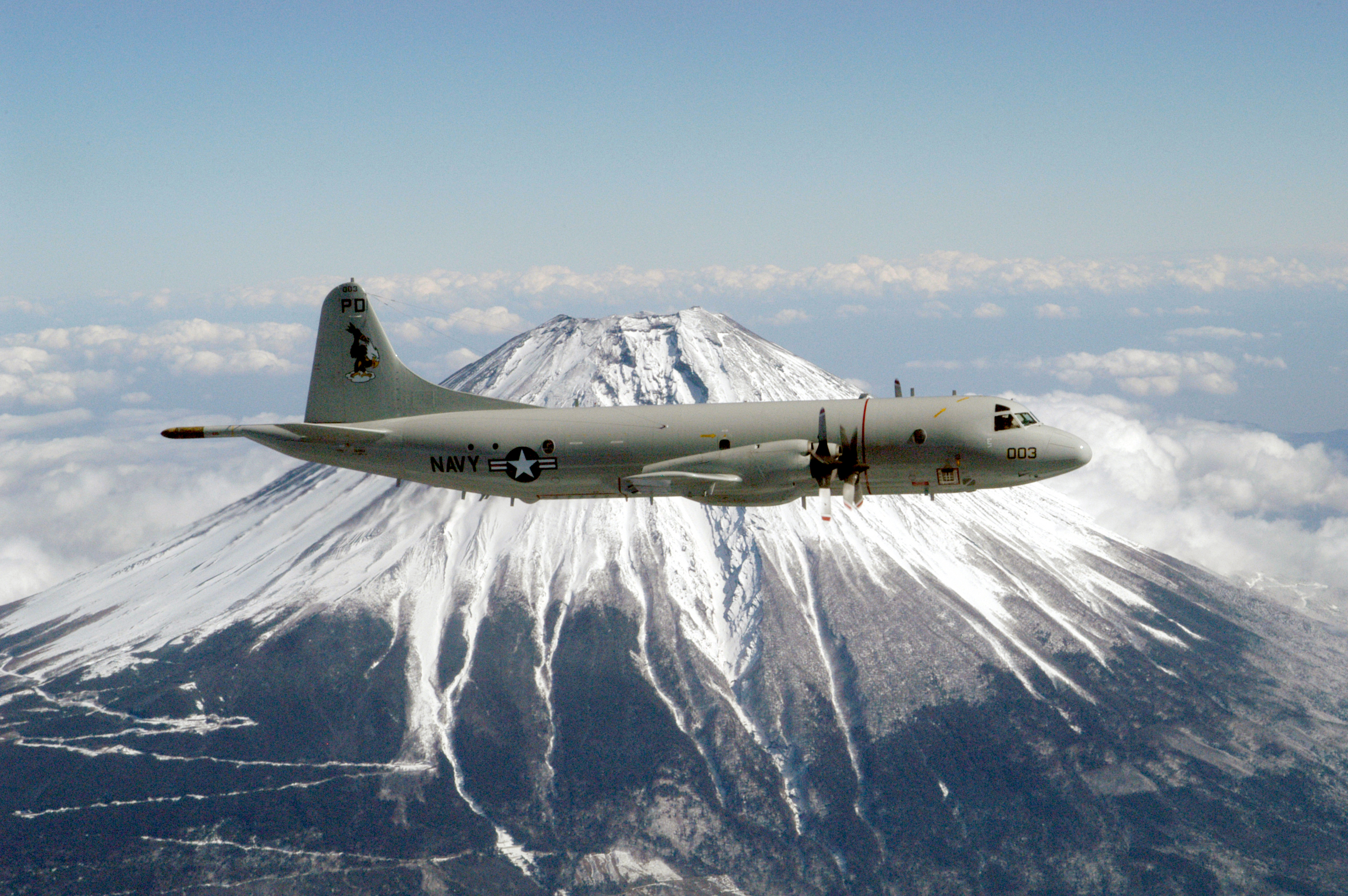
VP-9 P-3C over Mount Fuji in 2003

- 15 March 1951: VP-9 was established at NAS Seattle, Washington, flying the P4Y-2 Privateer. Fleet Aircraft Service Squadron 895 undertook training of the squadron's new crews.
- July 1951: Went to Barber's Point, Hawaii for six months training exercises and was relieved by VP 772.
- February 1952: VP-9 was given a permanent change of station to NAS Alameda, California, under operational control of FAW-4. The squadron flew the P4Y-2/2S with improved radar.
- 27 June 1952: VP-9 deployed to NAF Iwakuni, Japan. During this deployment a detachment was sent to Korea to aid in UN operations. VP-9 aircraft operated in conjunction with USMC F7F night-fighter aircraft, dropping parachute flares to light North Korean roads, bridges, supply dumps and convoys to aid the attacking F7Fs.
- January 1953: VP-9 turned in its PB4Y-2s for new P2V-2 Neptune aircraft. Conversion training was completed by September 1953.
- September 1953: VP-9 was deployed to NAS Atsugi, Japan, minus 12 of its newly trained pilots who had just been released from active duty due to the cessation of hostilities with North Korea on 27 July 1953.
- 22 June 1955: While patrolling in the Aleutian Islands area, a P2V-5 (BuNo 131515) of VP-9 based at NAS Kodiak, Alaska, was attacked by two Soviet MiG-15s. The Neptune's starboard engine was hit and caught fire, forcing the crew to crash on St. Lawrence Island near Gambell in the Bering Sea. There were no fatalities to the crew of 11, but four were injured by MiG gunfire and six others were hurt in the crash landing.
- 15 May 1958: VP-9 deployed to the Aleutians, based at NAS Kodiak, with detachments at NAF Adak and Fairbanks. The squadron made a series of exploratory flights over the Polar ice cap to aid the submarine USS Nautilus in her historic polar penetration.
- 21 April 1960: The squadron assisted the USAF in locating a B-58 Hustler bomber that crashed into the Great Salt Lake. A VP-9 P2V-7 located the sunken wreckage using its Magnetic anomaly detector (MAD) equipment.
- February 1962: VP-9 aircraft began receiving the AN/ASA-16 integrated display system, an upgrade of existing Anti-submarine warfare (ASW) detection equipment.
- 13 July 1962: Six aircraft of VP-9 participated with the Royal Canadian Air Force Squadron 407 in an ASW exercise off the coast of British Columbia.
- 1 December 1963: VP-9 was given a change of permanent duty station from NAS Alameda to NAS Moffett Field, California. During December the squadron began the transition to the P-3A Orion.
- 12 November 1964: VP-9 deployed to WestPac, based at NAF Naha, Okinawa, patrolling the Formosa Strait, South China Sea, Yellow Sea and Philippine Sea. The deployment marked the first operational use of the P-3A in WestPac.
- 4 December 1964: A squadron P-3A, BuNo 150508, and crew were lost over the South China Sea after a flare ignited a fire inside the aircraft.
- 17 January 1966: The squadron received its first P-3B Orion, the first assigned to a West Coast operational squadron. The ninth and final P-3B was received on 11 May 1967.
- 25 July – 4 December 1966: VP-9 deployed to NAF Naha, Okinawa, under the operational control of Commander Task Force 72. The deployment marked the first operational use of the P-3B Orion in the Western Pacific. A detachment was sent to Tainan, Taiwan, for one week commencing 4 December 1966 to participate in Operation Yankee Team. The joint USAF and U.S. Navy operation inaugurated on 21 May 1963, provided low-level aerial reconnaissance of suspected Communist infiltration routes in eastern and southern Laos.
- 13 December 1967: VP-9 was awarded the Navy Unit Commendation for service performed during the period 19 March through 1 April 1967 during its deployment in Southeast Asia.
- 9 September – 1 October 1968: A detachment of three squadron aircraft was maintained at NAS Agana, Guam, in support of the Acoustic Survey of the Philippine Sea. The survey was completed on 1 October 1968 and the aircraft and crews returned to NAS Moffet Field.
- February 1969: VP-9 aircraft were retrofitted to make them capable of employing the Bullpup air-to-surface missile.
- 1 April – 10 August 1969: VP-9 relieved VP-47 at NS Sangley Point, Philippines, and at Cam Ranh Bay Air Base, South Vietnam. Operational control was under FAW-8 until 4 August 1969, when relieved by FAW-10. On 5 August the squadron relocated to Cam Ranh Bay for watch duties. During the deployment the squadron conducted Operation Market Time patrols of the Gulf of Tonkin and coastal waters of South Vietnam. On 7 August the detachment at Cam Rahn Bay came under Viet Cong rocket attack with no damage resulting to squadron aircraft or personnel. The aircraft were immediately dispersed to NS Sangley Point and U-Tapao Royal Thai Navy Airfield, Thailand, until 10 August.
- 31 May 1969: VP-9 participated in SEATO exercise Sea Spirit, which was abruptly terminated on 2 June 1969 with the collision of the USS Frank E. Evans and HMAS Melbourne.
- 25 May 1970 to 28 November 1970: VP-9 split deployment to NAS Adak and NAS Agana, Guam, air and maintenance crews rotated from one site to another.
- 29 July 1971: VP-9 deployed to MCAS Iwakuni, Japan, with a detachment at RTNB U-Tapao.
- 5 May 1972: The squadron deployed a six-aircraft detachment to NAS Cubi Point, Philippines, marking the last patrols for VP-9 in the combat zone during the Vietnam War. The detachment augmented the VP units tasked with ocean surveillance air patrols in relationship to the mining of North Vietnamese harbors and the corresponding movement of Communist bloc ships.
- 1 July – October 1976: VP-9 began the transition to the new P-3C UI aircraft. The transition training was provided by VP-31 and continued through early September. The squadron's inventory of P-3B aircraft was turned over to VP-8. The squadron's full complement of nine new aircraft was reached in October.
- 10 May 1978: VP-9 deployed to NAS Adak, Alaska. During the six-month deployment the squadron flew reconnaissance patrols, ASW missions and surveillance coverage for over 10-million square miles of ocean.
- 26 October 1978: While on a routine patrol mission, Combat Air Crew 6 in a P-3C UI, BuNo 159892, ditched in heavy seas off the Aleutians due to an engine fire. Four of the 14 crew aboard perished before being rescued by the Soviet Vessel MYS Senyavina. The survivors were taken to Petropavlosk and returned to U.S. custody on 5 November 1978.
- 27 June – Nemberov 1979: VP-9 deployed to NAF Misawa, Japan. During the next month the squadron flew 125 sorties in support of exercise Multiplex 6-79. In August the squadron was called upon to support CTG 72.3 in the humanitarian effort to locate and rescue Vietnamese boat people. During the month of November the squadron participated in joint exercises with the Japan Self-Defense Forces and Republic of Korea Armed Forces.
- 10 October 1981: A squadron detachment of three aircraft deployed to NAS Adak and another three-aircraft detachment deployed to Kadena Air Base, Okinawa, on the same day. The latter detachment returned in late December 1981 and the former in February 1982, after months of diverse missions in very different climates.
- 10 January 1984: VP-9 deployed to Diego Garcia and maintained a detachment at Kadena AB. The squadron established a new precedent on the deployment by becoming the first patrol squadron to operate detachments out of Berbera, Somalia, and Al Masirah, Oman.
- 1 June 1985: VP-9 was the first "full" squadron to deploy to NAS Adak in over 13 years. Adak was reestablished as a Third Fleet maritime patrol aircraft forward-deployed site and VP-9 played a key role in the build-up of the Adak facilities to support a full patrol squadron. During the deployment the squadron participated in Bering Sea mammal surveys and flights over the polar ice cap to ensure safe navigational passage to Alaska's North Slope.
- 2 November 1986 – January 1987: VP-9 deployed for six months to WestPac, based at NAF Misawa/Misawa Air Base, Japan. The squadron was the first to deploy with the AN/APS-137 Inverse Synthetic Aperture Radar (ISAR), which reduced the size of the electronics package through microminiaturization and presented a greatly improved operator interface. In January 1987 the squadron was based at NAS Cubi Point, Philippines, during Exercises Sea Siam 87-1 and Team Spirit 2-87. Remote sites at NAS Agana, Guam, NAF Midway, Korea and Okinawa were visited during this period.
- 20 September 1989: VP-9, while deployed to Eielson Air Force Base, Alaska, received a modified P-3C, aircraft side number PD-01, with the "Outlaw Hunter" satellite communication and navigation system for operational testing and evaluation.
- 24 October 1989: The squadron's complement of aircraft was reduced from nine to eight P-3Cs due to decreased operational funding.
- January – March 1991: Three VP-9 detachments were sent to Panama on one-month deployments to assist counternarcotics (CN) drug interdiction efforts.
- 25–27 March 2006: A series of anti-submarine warfare exercises were held in Hawaiian waters that included Carrier Strike Group 9, the nuclear-powered attack submarines USS Seawolf, USS Cheyenne, USS Greeneville, USS Tucson, and USS Pasadena, as well as land-based P-3C Orions from patrol squadrons VP-4, VP-47, and VP-9.
- November 2017: VP-9 begin the transition to P-8A Poseidon after its final P-3C Orion deployment.
- 1 April 2019: VP-9 Deploys to NAS Sigonella for operations in the 6th Fleet AOR. This deployment marks VP-9's maiden P-8 deployment following platform transition from the P-3C.

== Aircraft assignments ==
The squadron was assigned the following aircraft, effective on the dates shown:

- P4Y-2 - March 1951
- P4Y-2/2S - June 1952
- P2V-2 - January 1953
- P2V-7 - 1956
- SP-2H - December 1962
- P-3A - December 1963
- P-3B - February 1966
- P-3C UI - July 1976
- P-3C UIIIR - August 1990
- P-8A - March 2017

== Home port assignments ==
The squadron was assigned to these home ports, effective on the dates shown:

- NAS Seattle, Washington - 15 March 1951
- NAS Alameda, California - February 1952
- NAS Moffett Field, California - 1 December 1963
- NAS Barbers Point, Hawaii - 20 November 1992
- Marine Corps Base Hawaii, Hawaii - May 1999
- NAS Whidbey Island, Washington - March 2017

== See also ==
- Maritime patrol aircraft
- List of Lockheed P-3 Orion variants
- List of United States Navy aircraft squadrons
- List of inactive United States Navy aircraft squadrons
- List of squadrons in the Dictionary of American Naval Aviation Squadrons
- History of the United States Navy

== See also ==
- History of the United States Navy
- List of United States Navy aircraft squadrons
- List of squadrons in the Dictionary of American Naval Aviation Squadrons
