= VP-47 =

Patrol Squadron 47
- Active: 1 June 1944 – present
- Country: United States
- Branch: United States Navy
- Garrison/HQ: Naval Air Station Whidbey Island
- Nickname: The Golden Swordsmen

Aircraft flown
- Patrol: PBM-3D/5; P5M-2/SP-5B; P-3A/B/C; P-8A Poseidon

Patrol Squadron 47 (VP-47), also known as "The Golden Swordsmen", is a maritime patrol squadron of the United States Navy based at Naval Air Station Whidbey Island, Washington (USA), attached to Patrol and Reconnaissance Wing 10. The squadron currently flies the Boeing P-8A Poseidon.

== History ==
The squadron was established as Patrol Squadron 27 (VP-27) on 1 June 1944, redesignated Patrol Bombing Squadron 27 (VPB-27) on 1 October 1944, redesignated Patrol Squadron 27 (VP-27) on 15 May 1946, redesignated Medium Patrol Squadron (Seaplane) 7 (VP-MS-7) on 15 November 1946 and redesignated Patrol Squadron 47 (VP-47) on 1 September 1948.

=== Operational history ===
VP-27 was established at NAS Norfolk, Virginia on 1 June 1944, under the operational control of FAW-5. A few days later squadron personnel were relocated to NAAS Harvey Point, North Carolina, for training as a seaplane squadron flying the PBM-3D Mariner. Between 4 and 22 August VP-27 was relocated to NAS Key West, Florida and subsequently, to NAAS Boca Chica, Florida, for training in Anti-submarine warfare (ASW) techniques, which was completed on 22 August. The squadron returned to NAAS Harvey Point for crew leave, and preparation for the cross-country flight to NAS Alameda, California. From 28 September to 1 October the squadron departed for NAS Alameda in detachments of three aircraft. Upon arrival on 1 October, the squadron aircrews were tasked with ferrying aircraft for FAW-8 from NAS Alameda to NAS Kaneohe Bay, Hawaii. On 25 November VPB-27 was relieved of duties with FAW-8 and boarded USS Attu for transportation to NAS Kaneohe Bay, Hawaii, arriving on 9 December. Upon arrival the squadron came under the operational control of FAW-2. Duties at NAS Kaneohe Bay consisted of training and ferrying aircraft to forward areas.

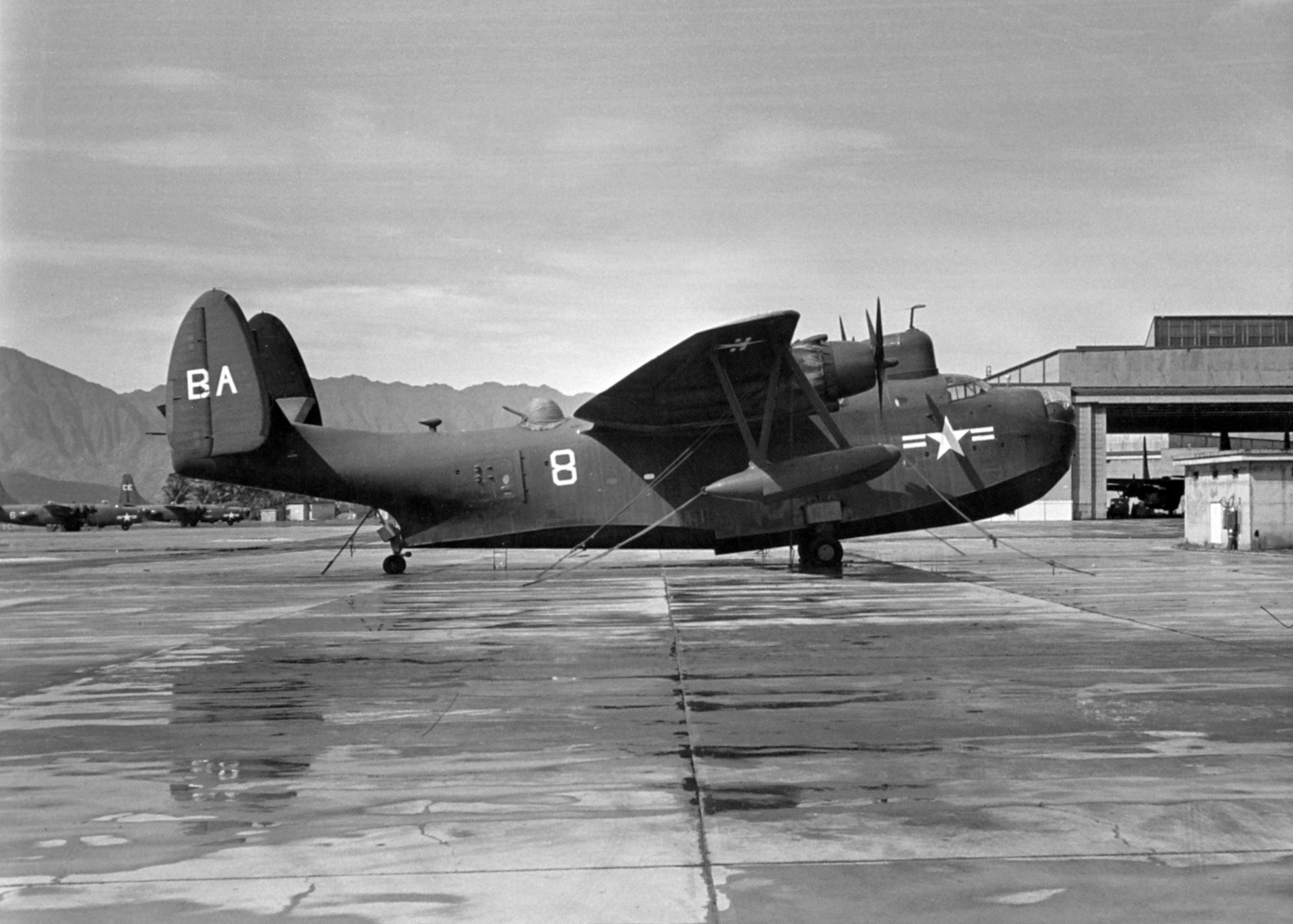
VP-47 PBM-5 at NAS Kaneohe Bay in 1949.

From 10 to 18 February 1945 the squadron moved forward to NAB Tanapag Harbor, Saipan. New PBM-5 aircraft were delivered shortly before the squadron deployed. Operations commenced at Saipan on 18 February 1945, under the operational control of FAW-1, with the squadron flying anti-shipping patrol (ASP), convoy cover, and air-sea rescue missions. Tender support during this period was provided by USS Onslow, USS Yakutat and USS Shelikof. From 23 March relocated to Kerama Rhetto, Ryuku Islands, to begin ASP operations in support of the assault on Okinawa. Operations from this location were extremely difficult due to large swells. Every takeoff was hazardous, as the long 14-hour night flights required extra fuel and bomb loads, making the takeoff weight of the aircraft well above the recommended maximums. This campaign was completed successfully in June, with patrols shifted to the China coast through the end of August. On 7 August two squadron aircraft piloted by Lieutenants (jg) O. L. Edwards and B. A. Gallagher were lost due to enemy action while attacking shipping at night in the waters off Formosa. All of the 24 aircrew were listed as killed in action. On 15 August the squadron received orders to stand down from combat operations, bringing the fighting phase of the war to an end. During the last months of the operation, the squadron lost eight aircraft: two shot down on a night mission, one shot down by a friendly night fighter, one from battle damage, one from detonation of bombs accidentally jettisoned, one from an emergency landing, and two damaged on reefs beyond economical repair. From 16 September 1945 to March 1946 the squadron was based at Sasebo Harbor, Kyushu, Japan. Duties consisted of courier and mail missions throughout the extent of the occupied Japanese islands.

In March 1946 VPB-27 returned to NAS Kaneohe Bay, under the operational control of FAW-2. On 2 Mar 1949 VP-47 was reassigned to a new home port at NAS San Diego, California, the move was completed on 26 March. The squadron came under the operational control of FAW-14.

From 30 January – April 1950: VP-47 deployed to NAB Saipan, with a detachment at NS Yokosuka, Japan, and NS Sangley Point, Philippines, coming under the operational control of FAW-1. The squadron participated in ASW exercises with British naval forces in March. Other ASW exercises were conducted in Japanese waters off Sasebo in conjunction with VP-28 during April. With the outbreak of the Korean War on 27 June, half of the squadron was still en route to the continental United States returning from deployment. The detachments were held up at Pearl Harbor; Guam; Sangley Point; and Yokosuka. All of the aircraft available were rerouted to Yokosuka to begin operations in the forward combat areas in Korea. By 7 July, the squadron's detachments had rejoined and were relocated to NAF Iwakuni, Japan. Advance bases were set up for temporary operations at Inchon and Chinhae, Korea. The squadron began combat patrols of Tsushima Strait, mine reconnaissance around Inchon and Wonsan, ASP over the Sasebo to Busan shipping lanes, and general utility services by 31 July 1950. VP-47 was relieved on 1 January 1951 for return to the U.S., with the last aircraft arriving at NAS San Diego on 31 January 1951, almost twelve months to the day since it departed on what was anticipated as a six-month deployment. Shortly after the squadron's return, it was assigned a new home base at NAS Alameda, Calif.

On 20 April 1951 the primary mission for VP-47 was changed from ASW to aerial mining. From 1 August 1951 VP-47 began its second tour in the Korean combat zone, based in the Pescadore Islands aboard USS Pine Island. Detachments were maintained at NS Sangley Point and Buckner Bay, Okinawa, Japan. On 22 November 1952 the squadron began its third tour in the Korean combat zone, based at NAF Iwakuni, Japan, aboard USS Kenneth Whiting and USS Gardiners Bay. Patrols covered the Yellow Sea and the Sea of Japan. A detachment was maintained at Fukuoka, Japan, aboard USS Corson.

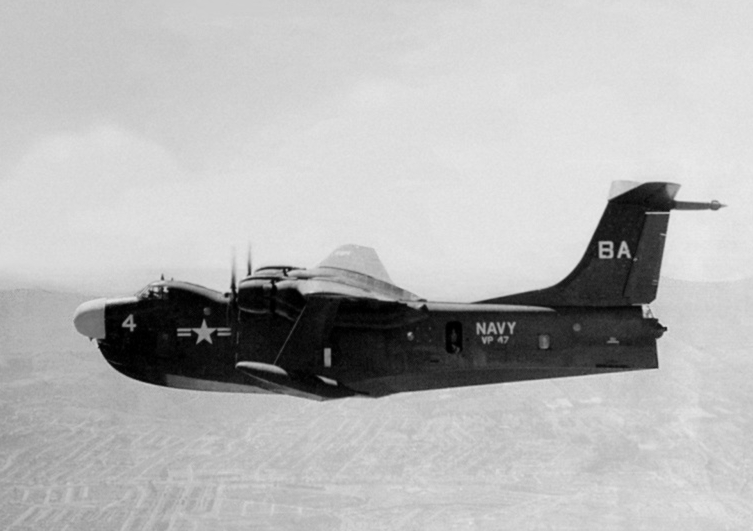
VP-47 P5M-2 in 1954

From 8 October 1954 VP-47 began reequipping with the P5M-2 Marlin as replacement for the PBM Mariner seaplanes flown since 1944. VP-47 was the first fleet activity to receive the new model. Transition to the new aircraft was completed by April 1955, when the last PBM was turned over to the FASRON at NAS Alameda, California. In June 1955 VP-47 deployed for a tour with its new T-tail P5M-2 Marlin seaplanes to Ford Island, Hawaii, and then on to WestPac. After one month of training, the squadron deployed to NAS Iwakuni, Japan, for five months of duty. During advanced base operations the squadron was supported by USS Orca. In August 1956 VP-47 conducted a deployment to WestPac, based at NAF Iwakuni, Japan. The squadron came under the operational control of FAW-6 during this deployment. By this date, the squadron aircraft were equipped with the tail-mounted Magnetic anomaly detector (MAD) gear. On 31 October 1959 VP-47 deployed to NAF Iwakuni, Japan. Mine drop experiments were conducted during the deployment in Buckner Bay under the direction of CTF-72.

In August 1960 VP-47 was relocated to a new home base at NAS Whidbey Island, Washington due to excessive and uncontrollable driftwood and debris that continually cluttered the NAS Alameda seadrome.

On 17 August 1964 VP-47 deployed to WestPac, based at NS Sangley Point participating in wartime patrols off the coasts of Vietnam. It was the first complete patrol squadron to deploy to South Vietnam subsequent to the 2 August Gulf of Tonkin incident. The detachment, stationed off the coast of South Vietnam, was provided tender service by USS Salisbury Sound.

On 1 March 1965 VP-47 was relocated to a new home base at NAS Moffett Field, California. Effective on the change of home port, the squadron commenced transition to the Lockheed P-3A Orion, converting from a seaplane squadron to a landplane patrol squadron. On 4 January 1966 the squadron deployed to NAF Naha, Okinawa, with occasional detachments at NS Sangley Point. On 1 July 1967 VP-47 became the first P-3B patrol squadron equipped with the AGM-12 Bullpup missile to deploy to WestPac. During the deployment the squadron operated from NAF Naha, Okinawa, with a detachment at U-Tapao Royal Thai Navy Airfield, Thailand, flying many hours in Operation Market Time and Yankee Station patrol missions. On 25 October 1968 VP-47 deployed to NS Sangley Point, with a detachment at NAF Cam Ranh Bay, South Vietnam. The squadron participated in Market Time and Yankee Station patrols in support of the 7th Fleet.

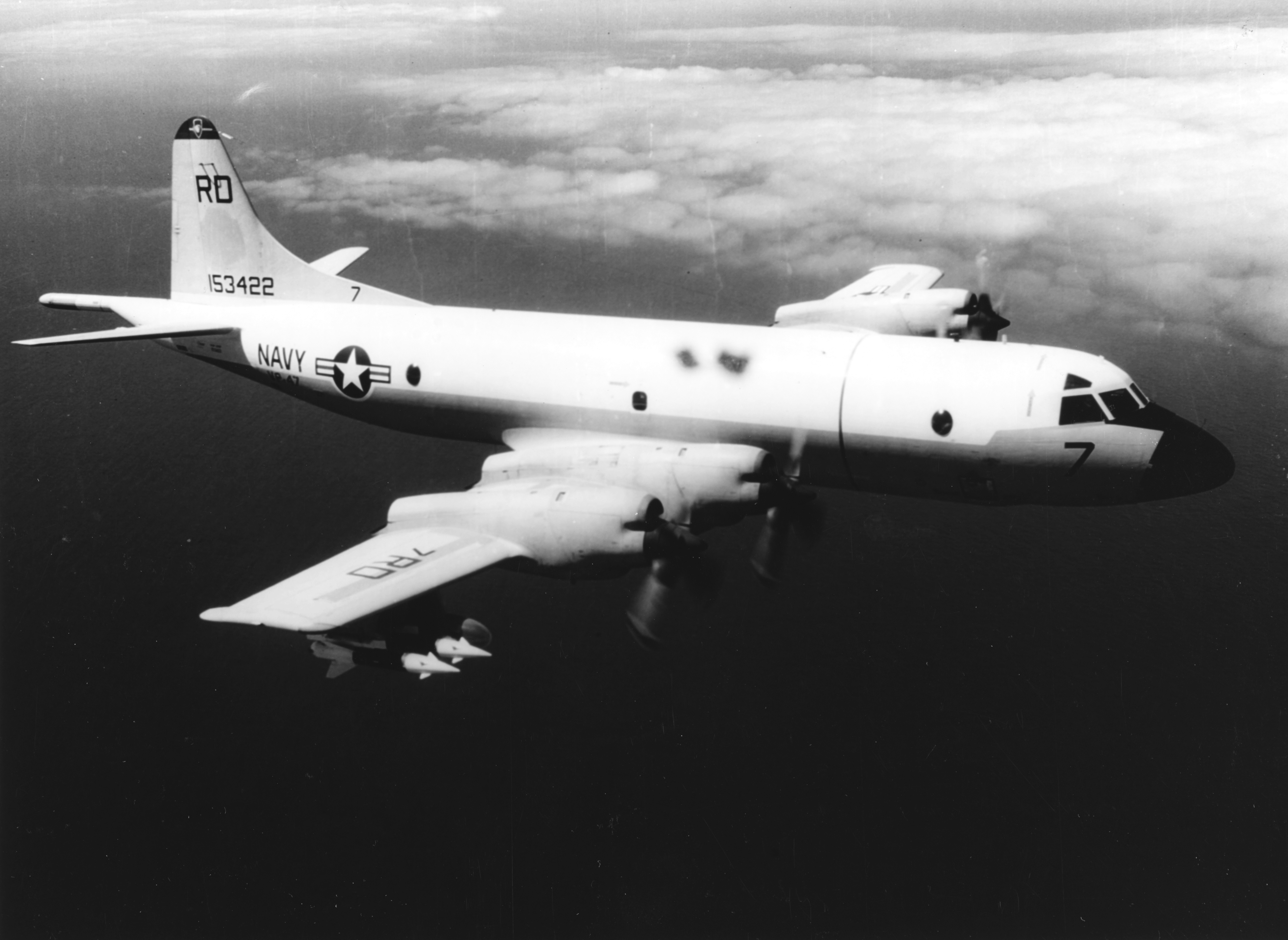
VP-47 P-3B equipped with AGM-12 Bullpup missiles off South Vietnam in 1968

On 11 January 1970 VP-47 departed on a six-month deployment to WestPac, based at NAF Naha, Okinawa, with detachments at NAF Cam Ranh Bay and RTNAF U-Tapao. During the tour the squadron participated in Market Time patrols off the coast of Vietnam, earning a Meritorious Unit Commendation for action against enemy resupply activities in the South China Sea. After returning to NAS Moffett Field in July 1970, the squadron began transition from the P-3B to the P-3C Orion. VP-47 was the first operational Pacific Fleet squadron to be equipped with the P-3C.

On 1 Jun 1971 VP-47 became the first P-3C equipped patrol squadron to deploy to NAS Adak, Alaska. The squadron received a second Meritorious Unit Commendation for its activities in support of the Cannikan Nuclear Testing Project on Amchitka in early November.

On 12 April 1973 P-3C, BuNo. 157332, RD05, and five personnel were killed in a midair collision with NASA Convair 990 on approach to runway 32L at NAS Moffett Field. Only one of the Navy crewmen - an Anti-submarine Warfare Technician (AW) third class petty officer sitting in the rear observer seat - survived the crash. All 11 civilians aboard the NASA aircraft were killed.

In August 1974 VP-47 departed Moffett Field on a six-month split WestPac deployment to NAS Adak, Alaska and NAS Agana, Guam. After returning to Moffett Field in January 1975, the squadron won the Isbell Trophy in April and a second Royal Canadian Air Force Coastal Command Trophy in May, for completing 24 months of continuous "Alpha" crew status.

In October 1986 VP-47 received their first P-3C UIII aircraft. Three crew elements were given transition training by VP-31 at NAS Moffett Field, through spring of 1987, when the last P-3C MOD aircraft was replaced. On 10 August 1987 VP-47 deployed to NAF Misawa, Japan, with a detachment at Kadena Air Base, Okinawa. The squadron maintained a continuous surveillance of Soviet surface and submarine activity, including a suspected Iranian arms carrier located in the Yellow Sea.

From 4–17 October 1989: The Moffett Field detachment of the squadron played host to the Soviet Minister of Defense, General Dmitry Yazov, and other Soviet dignitaries, providing them a tour of the squadron aircraft and support facilities. Two weeks later, on 17 October, a major earthquake rocked the San Francisco area. Squadron aircraft that were airborne at that time could not land until the runways were inspected.

In February 1991 VP-47 lent several of its aircraft to VP-48 for use during the Gulf War. From April to June 1991 a detachment of aircraft deployed to Panama to assist in the DoD Drug Interdiction program. VP-47 detected 562 surface contacts and intercepted two air contacts during the deployment.

From 15 May 1993 VP-47 conducted a multi-site deployment with detachments located at different intervals at NAS Adak, Alaska; NAF Misawa, Japan; Pohang Air Base, Korea; Diego Garcia and Fujairah, U.A.E. With the closure of NAS Moffett Field VP-47 was relocated to NAS Barbers Point, Hawaii. From 6 November 1994 VP-47 conducted another multi-site deployment, with detachments located at different times at Diego Garcia; Jeddah, Saudi Arabia; RAFO Masirah, Oman; and Kadena, Okinawa.

On 25 March 1995 aircrew 9 in P-3C, BuNo. 158217, from the squadron's Oman detachment was performing an ASW mission with the USS Constellation battle group, 200 miles (320 km) east of Oman and was in the process of returning to base at Masirah when engine problems occurred. The PPC, Lieutenant Jeff Harrison, experienced the worst engine failure ever to occur in the entire P-3C series of aircraft. The number four propeller sheared from the turbine shaft, struck the fuselage and severed 35 of 44 engine and flight control cables, causing a shutdown of all four engines. Harrison managed to make a textbook water landing without power and with no casualties to the crew, earning him the Distinguished Flying Cross for his coolness under the unusual emergency conditions.

An at-home training cycle from May 1995 to May 1996 prepared VP-47 for their next deployment to Misawa and Kadena. During that time, VP-47 became the first Extended Echo Ranging (EER) qualified patrol squadron and was the first squadron to employ EER tactics in real-world operations. In November 1996, VP-47 returned from a successful split-site deployment to NAF Misawa and Kadena AB, Japan. During this deployment, VP-47 conducted the first non-bilateral, USN operations with the Philippines since the departure of U.S. military forces. In addition, VP-47 sent the first crews on detachment to Chennai, India during Exercise Sahara 97. VP-47 also sponsored the Special Olympics at Naval Air Facility Misawa. VP-47 was awarded the COMSEVENTHFLT Tactics "Battle E" for undersea warfare (USW) during its Misawa/Kadena deployment. From December 1996 to October 1997, VP-47 conducted a home cycle. Crews detached to NAS North Island in San Diego and NAS Point Mugu in Ventura, California, as well as NAS Adak, Wake Island, and Chile. In addition, VP-47 hosted a P-3 squadron from the Japan Maritime Self-Defense Force. VP-47 reached a milestone in November 1997 having accomplished 150,000 mishap-free flight hours. Complementing the command's operational focus are its well-known personnel programs as recognized by CINCPACFLT in awarding the 1997 Golden Anchor award for excellence in command retention and personnel programs management. During the same period, VP-47 distinguished themselves by setting the highest Mine Readiness Certification Score in COMPATWINGSPAC history. In June 1998, the personnel in VP-47 returned from a six-month quad site WESTPAC/Persian Gulf deployment to Diego Garcia. Crews and aircraft were detached to Kadena, Japan; Masirah, Oman; Manama, Bahrain and Diego Garcia. VP-47 also flew missions in the Persian Gulf in support of Operation Southern Watch. In addition, VP-47 conducted Maritime Interdiction Operations enforcing United Nations' sanctions against Iraq. VP-47 received its first P-3C Anti-surface Warfare Improvement Program (P-3C AIP) aircraft in March 1999. The next month, VP-47's safety record was recognized with the Chief of Naval Operations Safety Award. In June 1999, VP-47 departed for its Misawa, Japan deployment and was the last naval squadron stationed at NAS Barbers Point, which later closed under the Base Realignment and Closure (BRAC) program.

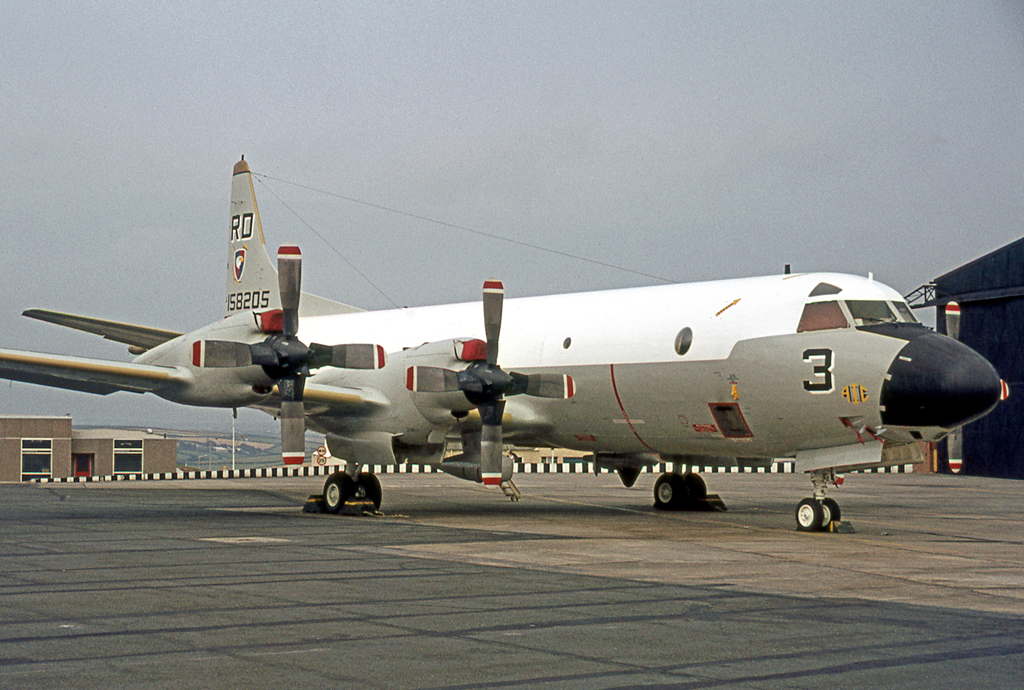
VP-47 P-3C visiting RAF Kinloss Scotland in 1974.

Following a successful WESTPAC deployment, VP-47 took residence at its new homeport, Marine Corps Base Hawaii, Kaneohe Bay. In February 2000, VP-47 was again awarded the prestigious "Golden Wrench" award for its outstanding maintenance record in 1999. In June, VP-47 successfully hosted Maritime Patrol Aircrews from Japan, South Korea, Canada, Australia, and the United Kingdom in support of RIMPAC 2000. In December 2000, VP-47 returned to the Persian Gulf on a six-month deployment to support Multinational Maritime Interdiction Operations. In June 2002, VP-47 once again deployed to Southwest Asia and Southeast Asia, flying missions over Afghanistan and the Philippines in support of Operation Enduring Freedom. Additionally, the squadron received the Captain Arnold Jay Isbell award for excellence in Air ASW for multiple exercises and operations in Southeast Asia. In April 2003, the squadron was the recipient of COMPACFLT's Gold Anchor Award for retention excellence. From December 2003 to May 2004, VP-47 was engaged in all phases of Operation Enduring Freedom (OEF) and Operation Iraqi Freedom (OIF), flying combat missions from Bahrain, Diego Garcia, Afghanistan and Djibouti, in support of coalition forces. From November 2005 to June 2006, VP-47 conducted anti-piracy operations off the Horn of Africa while simultaneously patrolling the skies over the Persian Gulf and Iraq. During this time, VP-47 was also engaged in exercises in the Pacific in support of OEF Philippines. In January 2006, the squadron located the pirated vessel Safina Al Bisarat, leading to the U. S. Navy's first capture of pirates on the high seas in over 200 years. Between 25 and 27 March 2006, the squadron also participated in a series of anti-submarine warfare exercises in Hawaiian waters that included Carrier Strike Group Nine, the nuclear-powered attack submarines USS Seawolf, USS Cheyenne, USS Greeneville, USS Tucson, and USS Pasadena, as well as other P-3 aircraft from patrol squadrons VP-4 and VP-9.

In February 2007, VP-47 flew the only U.S. asset involved in the international rescue effort on the capsized Egyptian cruise liner MS al-Salam Boccaccio 98 in the Red Sea. In March 2007, VP-47 was awarded the 2006 Golden Wrench Award for maintenance excellence. In June 2007, all Patrol and Reconnaissance Wing Two maintenance departments transitioned to Consolidated Maintenance Organization TWO (CMO-2). Despite training for the SIXTH Fleet/Mediterranean and FOURTH Fleet/Southern Command Areas of Responsibility (AOR), VP-47 responded to a Chairman of the Joint Chiefs of Staff (CJCS) request for forces and instead deployed to the FIFTH Fleet/Persian Gulf AOR one month ahead of schedule in November 2007. From October 2007 to May 2008, VP-47/CMO-2 deployed to Ali Air Base, Iraq, in support of OIF, with detachments to Djibouti and Al Udeid Air Base, Qatar. While deployed, the squadron established Task Group 57.18 at Ali Air Base, becoming the first fully deployed maritime patrol squadron to Iraq. In December 2007, the squadron surpassed 34 years and 200,000 hours of mishap-free flying. The Patrol Squadron Four Seven/CMO-2 Team exceeded all requirements associated with an inter-squadron deployment to Iraq, supporting United States Central Command (USCENTCOM) and Multinational Forces-Iraq (MNF-I) in their efforts to defeat the Iraqi counterinsurgency. This deployment saw VP-47 complete 100% of taskings by flying 850 operational sorties, amassing over 6,100 mishap-free flight hours. VP-47 continued to demonstrate their maritime expertise by leading the U.S. contingent of a multi-national exercise task force during RIMPAC 2008 where they coordinated and flew 40 missions including the successful firing of an AGM-65F Maverick air-to-surface missile. Additionally, the squadron successfully supported countless carrier and expeditionary strike group workups and exercises from NAS North Island in San Diego to Japan. In March 2009, CMO-2 disbanded and organizational-level aircraft maintenance responsibilities returned to VP-47.

In 2017, VP-47 moved to NAS Whidbey Island and transitioned from the P-3C Orion to the P-8A Poseidon aircraft.

10 April 2019, the squadron returned to NAS Whidbey Island after its first overseas deployment to the U.S. 7th Fleet area of operations in Okinawa, Japan with its P-8A Poseidons. The deployment last six months.

== Aircraft assignments ==
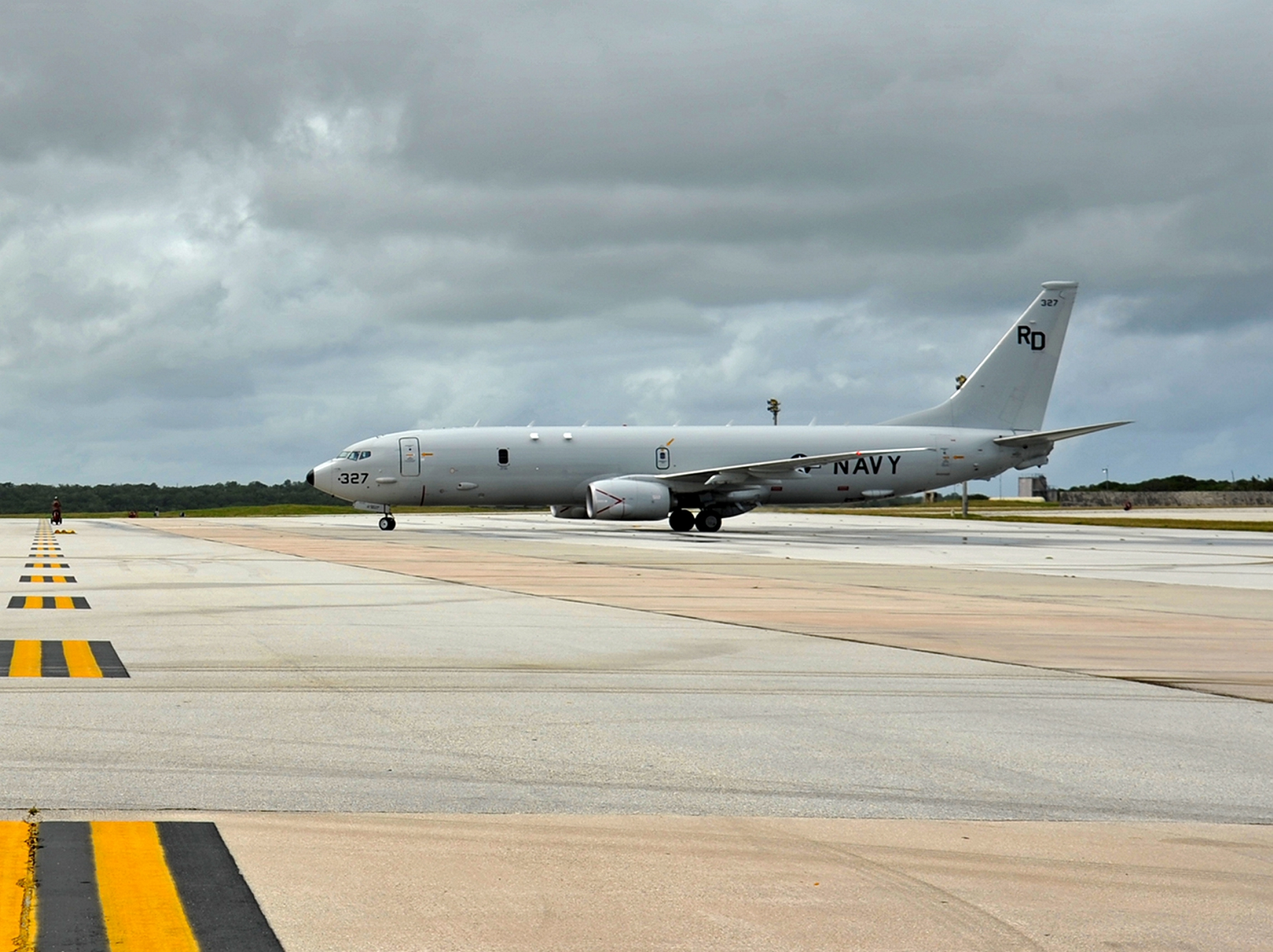
A VP-47 P-8A Poseidon at Andersen Air Force Base, in January 2019.

The squadron was assigned the following aircraft, effective on the dates shown:

- PBM-3D - June 1944
- PBM-5 - January 1945
- P5M-2 - October 1954
- SP-5B - December 1962
- P-3A - March 1965
- P-3B - 1967
- P-3C - October 1970
- P-3C UII - 1985
- P-3C UIII - October 1986
- P-8A Poseidon - September 2017

== Home port assignments ==
The squadron was assigned to these home ports, effective on the dates shown:

- NAS Norfolk, Virginia - 1 June 1944
- NAAS Harvey Point, North Carolina - 3 June 1944
- NAS Alameda, California - 28 September 1944
- NAS Kaneohe Bay, Hawaii - 9 December 1944
- Sasebo, Japan - 16 September 1945
- NAS Kaneohe Bay - March 1946
- NAS San Diego, California - 2 March 1949
- NAS Alameda - February 1951
- NAS Whidbey Island, Washington - August 1960
- NAS Moffett Field, California - 1 March 1965
- NAS Barbers Point, Hawaii - June 1993
- MCAS Kaneohe Bay, Hawaii - 1999
- NAS Whidbey Island, Washington - 2017

== See also ==
- History of the United States Navy
- List of United States Navy aircraft squadrons
- List of squadrons in the Dictionary of American Naval Aviation Squadrons
