= VP-4 =

Patrol Squadron 4
- Active: 1 July 1943 – Present
- Country: United States
- Branch: United States Navy
- Type: Squadron
- Role: Submarine
- Part of: Patrol and Reconnaissance Wing 10
- Garrison/HQ: Naval Air Station Whidbey Island, Oak Harbor, Washington
- Nickname: The Skinny Dragons
- Engagements: Cold War; Vietnam War; Operation Desert Shield; Operation Desert Storm; Operation Enduring Freedom; Operation Iraqi Freedom

Aircraft flown
- Patrol: PV-1; PV-2; P2V-1/2/5/5F/SP-2h; P-3A/B/C; P-8A

Patrol Squadron Four (VP-4) is a U.S. Navy land-based patrol squadron based at the Naval Air Station Whidbey Island, Oak Harbor, Washington, which is tasked to undertake maritime patrol, anti-submarine warfare (ASW), and intelligence, surveillance and reconnaissance (ISR) missions flying the Boeing P-8 Poseidon.

The squadron was originally established as Bombing Squadron 144 (VB-144) on 1 July 1943, redesignated Patrol Bombing Squadron 144 (VPB-144) on 1 October 1944, redesignated Patrol Squadron 144 (VP-144) on 15 May 1946, redesignated Medium Patrol Squadron (Landplane) 4 (VP-ML-4) on 15 November 1946 and redesignated Patrol Squadron 4 (VP-4) on 1 September 1948. It is the second squadron to be designated VP-4, the first VP-4 was redesignated VP-22 on 1 July 1939.

== History ==
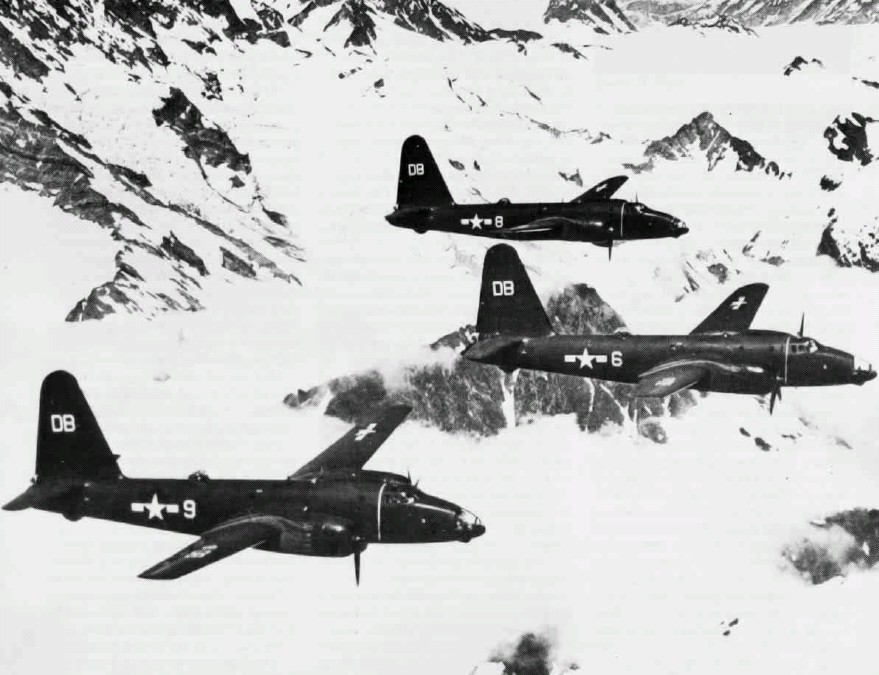
VP-4 P2V-2s over Alaska in 1948

VB-144 was established at NAS Alameda, California on 1 July 1943, as a squadron flying the PV-1 Ventura, by 14 August The squadron completed training and boarded USS Copahee for transport to NAS Kaneohe Bay, Hawaii. Upon arrival the squadron began an intensive period of combat training and operational patrols over the ocean near the Hawaiian Islands. On 9 January 1944 VB-144 was transferred to Hawkins Field, Tarawa, where combat patrols commenced as soon as the squadron was checked in and assigned space for the crews and aircraft. On 1 February 1944, the squadron was relocated to Dyess Field, Roi Island, from which bombing missions were carried out against Japanese installations in the Gilbert, Marshall and Eastern Caroline island chains. On 30 March 1944 VB-144 was transferred back to Tarawa, leaving a three-aircraft detachment at Dyess Field, which was engaged in strikes on 1 April 1944 against enemy positions at Wotje Atoll and Jaluit Atoll that continued through June. On 4 April 1944, the increasing tempo of operations at Dyess Field resulted in the deployment of a second detachment of VB-144 aircraft to Roi Island and by 1 September the remainder of the squadron was transferred to Dyess. On 30 September 1944 VB-144 was transferred to NAS Kaneohe Bay and was redesignated VPB-144 while preparing for return to the continental United States. On 1 November 1944 VPB-144 was reformed for training at NAS Whidbey Island, Washington. The squadron was reequipped with the newer PV-2 Harpoon. On 3 March 1945, the squadron commenced training in air-to-ground attack continued at NAS Moffett Field, California. From 8–15 April 1945 VPB-144 squadron personnel and equipment were loaded aboard USS Kadashan Bay for transport to Naval Base Pearl Harbor, Hawaii, arriving on 15 April. Upon arrival, the squadron was based at NAS Kaneohe Bay, where a combat training syllabus of several weeks was undertaken. From 11–23 May 1945 a detachment of squadron aircraft and crews was flown to Midway Island to provide combat air patrol coverage. On 23 May 1945, the detachment was increased to nine aircraft. On 24 May 1945 two of the crews sent to Midway earlier returned to NAS Kaneohe Bay. The remainder of the detachment followed, rejoining the rest of the squadron on 12 June 1945. On 27 June 1945 VPB-144 was transferred to Eniwetok, via Johnston Atoll and Majuro. The squadron was placed under the operational control of TF 96.1. Sector and photographic reconnaissance patrols were conducted over Wake and Ponape islands. By 12 September 1945, problems with malaria on Wake Island became so severe that the aircraft of VPB-144 were fitted with sprayers to cover the island with DDT. On 15 September 1945 flights were conducted over Kusaie, Ponape and the Caroline Islands as a show of force to the remaining Japanese troops who had not yet surrendered. By 15 May 1946: Squadron assets remained at NAB Tinian but all personnel were rotated back to the U.S., leaving the squadron in a caretaker status. In September 1946 the squadron was retained on the Navy roster, but was placed in an inactive status at NAS North Island, California, under FAW-14. In Nov 1947 the squadron was reactivated as VP-ML-4 at NAS Miramar, California, with a complement of 14 officers and 59 enlisted men. An SNB-5 was utilized for flight training until the arrival of the squadron's first operational aircraft, the P2V-1 Neptune, in mid-December 1947.

VP-4 conducted an aerial photographic survey of Southeastern Alaska from Annette Island and began regular rotation tours to NAS Kodiak, Alaska from NAS Whidbey Island. Following the start of the Korean War, the squadron was deployed to NAS Barbers Point, Hawaii. in July, 1950, developing aerial mining capabilities and remained there until its return to Whidbey Island in January, 1951. During this deployment, Aircraft BuNo 39340, SC-3 was lost with five crewmen during a rocket firing training exercise off Kaena Point. The squadron was redeployed to NAS Barbers Point in mid 1951 and from there to NAS Kodiak in September, returning to NAS Whidbey Island in late December of that year. In April 1952, VP-4 again was deployed to NAS Barbers Point and from there to NAS Agana, Guam in September. The squadron returned to NAS Whidbey Island in January 1953, having turned in its P2V-2s and receiving P2V-5s in February. VP-4 remained in NAS Whidbey Island until November 1953 and was then transferred to Kadena Air Base and subsequently to NAF Naha, Okinawa, where the squadron flew shipping patrols in the vicinity of Taiwan. The squadron returned to NAS Whidbey Islandin mid-1954.

In 1956, VP-4 was relocated to NAF Naha, from this base, the squadron flew reconnaissance and Anti-submarine warfare (ASW) missions to counter the Communist Chinese threat to the islands of Matsu and Quemoy. In 1964, the squadron marked its fourth year of operational excellence with three Commander, Naval Air Forces Pacific (COMNAVAIRPAC) Navy Battle "E" Awards, three Chief of Naval Operations (CNO) Safety Awards, and four Arnold J. Isbell ASW Awards. In April 1964, VP-4 returned to NAS Barbers Point, from there, the squadron made numerous deployments to Southeast Asia in support of the Vietnam War. It was on one of these deployments in 1965 when the squadron logo was changed from the Okinawa-era "Neptune" design to a Hawaiian-inspired "Black Griffin." The logo caused some confusion on the part of waitresses in the local Officer's Club, who remarked that it more closely resembled a "Skinny Dragon" and the new nickname was quickly adopted.

In 1966, the VP-4 began transitioning from the SP-2H Neptune to the P-3A Orion. Following completion of the transition, VP-4 became the first Hawaii-based squadron to deploy P-3As to NAS Adak, Alaska in 1969. In 1972, VP-4 was awarded the Navy Meritorious Unit Commendation for its efforts during Operations Market Time and Yankee Team. During the 1975 deployment to NAS Cubi Point, Philippines VP-4 participated in the Operation Frequent Wind, the evacuation of South Vietnam and the Mayaguez recovery operation, and in 1976 saw detachment operations to NAS Agana, Guam during which the squadron participated in Australia's Kangaroo II fleet exercise.

In July 1978, VP-4 assumed the Guam Detachment and simultaneously conducted operations that stretched around the world including locations as distant as: NAS Cubi Point; NAS Barbers Point; NAS Moffett Field, California; NAS Brunswick, Maine and NAS Sigonella, Italy. VP-4 finished transitioning to the P-3B (MOD), or "SUPER BEE" in May 1979. The squadron then started a work up period for its next NAS Cubi Point deployment, which began in November 1979. While assigned to COMNAVAIRPAC, VP-4 was awarded the Navy Battle "E" Award for operational excellence for the cycle from 1 January 1979 to 30 June 1980. During the height of the Cold War, VP-4 fought on the front lines. Making numerous deployments to NAS Cubi Point; Diego Garcia; Kadena Air Base and Misawa Air Base, Japan; NAS Adak, Alaska and numerous other remote detachment sites, the squadron located, tracked and collected vital intelligence on Soviet ballistic missile and attack submarines. This era in VP-4's history is marked by a number of "firsts" including becoming the first squadron at NAS Barbers Point to transition to the P-3C, the first NAS Barbers Point squadron to deploy to Diego Garcia (May 1980), and the first Hawaii squadron to deploy with P-3Cs to NAS Adak. VP-4's operational excellence and contributions to the Cold War were recognized in 1987 in once again earning the Navy Battle "E" Award. Additionally, during this time, the squadron's concern for the safety and welfare of its Sailors was marked by surpassing 100,000 hours of mishap-free flying and earning back-to-back Golden Anchor Retention Excellence awards in 1987 and 1988.

In 1988 VP-4 returned to Hawaii where they participated in numerous exercises, including Exercise RIMPAC. In 1989 VP-4 completed a highly deployment to NAS Adak, conducting numerous ASW operations and participating in PACIFIC EXERCISE-89, the largest Naval exercise since World War II. Deploying to Diego Garcia in November 1990, VP-4 quickly established a detachment at RAFO Masirah, Oman to enforce the United Nations Embargo against Iraq during Operation Desert Shield. By early January 1991, 179 missions had challenged 3,669 merchant vessels. The embargo gave way to Battle Force Protection as war was declared on 17 January 1991. Flying 279 combat missions and 2,779 flight hours in the Persian Gulf in support of Operations Desert Shield and Desert Storm, VP-4 provided detection and targeting, resulting in the total destruction of the Iraqi Navy.

Upon returning home to Hawaii, VP-4 learned that it had again received the Chief of Naval Operations Golden Anchor and the Commander, Patrol Wings Pacific (COMPATWINGSPAC) Golden Orion for retention excellence. In November 1993, VP-4 deployed to Misawa AB, Japan, and established a permanent detachment at Kadena AB, Okinawa. While on deployment, VP-4 received the 1993 Chief of Naval Operations Aviation Safety Award for a Pacific Fleet Maritime Patrol Squadron, the Commander, US 7th Fleet Award and the Captain Arnold Jay Isbell Trophy, both for Anti-Submarine Warfare (ASW) excellence.

After completing a home training cycle, VP-4 conducted a split-site deployment to Misawa AB and Kadena AB in 1995. During this deployment the squadron flew around the clock for seventeen straight days during the Third Taiwan Strait Crisis, providing intelligence support and protection against anti-surface and subsurface threats to both the USS Nimitz and USS Independence carrier battle groups. In early 1997, VP-4 completed a quad-site deployment to Diego Garcia; Masirah, Oman; Manama, Bahrain, and Kadena AB, Japan. While on deployment, VP-4 aircrew and maintenance personnel conducted the first permanent detachment in the Persian Gulf. In addition, VP-4 acted as the armed patrol aircraft detachment from Doha, Qatar, flying 21 straight days with weapons and exercised the first 24-hour armed ready alert Maritime Patrol Aviation (MPA) posture in the Persian Gulf. VP-4 acted as the fleet's "eyes in the sky" in support of Maritime Interdiction Operations (MIO), enforcing United Nations Security Council Resolutions (UNSCRs) and the Iraqi Oil for Food program. In 1998, pursuant to the BRAC decision to close NAS Barbers Point, VP-4 relocated to NAS Kaneohe Bay, now known as Marine Corps Base Hawaii. In December 1998, VP-4 again deployed to six sites around the Middle East, during their deployment, the squadron participated in three combat operations: Operation Desert Fox, where they were awarded the Navy Unit Commendation; Operation Southern Watch, where VP-4 triggered the initial strike and delivered pre and post-strike imagery; and Operations Allied Force/Noble Anvil in Kosovo, which resulted in VP-4's Combat Air Crew 10 being awarded eleven (11) Air Medals. In home waters that same year, VP-4 also hosted 35 countries during RIMPAC 98.

VP-4 was the first VP squadron to introduce the P-3C Anti-Surface Warfare Improvement Program (P-3C AIP) aircraft to the Fleet. VP-4 proved AIP's power during deployment by supporting three aircraft carrier battle groups in the Persian Gulf and becoming the first squadron to achieve reliable AIP imagery transfer. VP-4 was also the first squadron in the US 7th Fleet to fire the AGM-65 Maverick air-to-surface missile from a P-3C AIP aircraft. In November 1999, VP-4 flew to NAS North Island, California to participate in Joint Fleet Exercise (JTFEX/FLEETEX). While at JTFEX/FLEETEX, the squadron participated in 23 events, including AIP and AGM-84 Standoff Land Attack Missile (SLAM) demo flights.

In June 2000, VP-4 conducted a WESTPAC deployment with detachments in 13 countries and participating in 27 multi-national exercises. The squadron also saved 22 lives in various Search and Rescue (SAR) operations within the Seventh Fleet’s Area of Responsibility (AOR). The squadron was again honored with the Navy Battle "E" Award in 2000, the third such award in five years. Following the September 11 attacks, VP-4 deployed to the US Central Command (USCENTCOM) AOR under Commander, Task Force 57 (CTF 57), a subordinate element of US Naval Forces Central Command (USNAVCENT)/US 5th Fleet. VP-4 conducted overland operations above Afghanistan flying armed reconnaissance missions and over the waters of the Middle East conducting Leadership Interdiction Operations in the first days of Operation Enduring Freedom. Over Afghanistan, VP-4 aircraft provided commanders a bird's eye view of the terrain where US special operations forces (SOF) were operating to dislodge Taliban and Al-Qaeda fighters from their mountainous hideouts. VP-4 also played a pivotal role in Operation Anaconda, the largest land battle in Afghanistan to that date. Over water, aircrews were instrumental in operations to intercept and cut-off fleeing Taliban and Al-Qaeda fighters. For their efforts, VP-4 was once again recognized with the 2002 Commander, Naval Air Force Pacific Battle "E" Award as the top P-3 squadron in the Pacific Fleet.

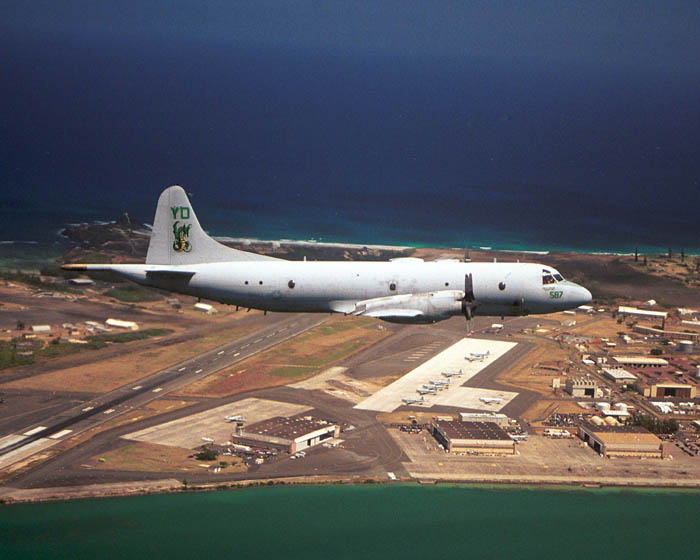
VP-4 P-3C over Marine Corps Base Hawaii in 2010

During their 2003 deployment, VP-4 continued to support Operation Enduring Freedom against terrorist factions in the Philippines, providing critical real-time intelligence. These missions highlighted the expanse of Coalition operations against Al-Qaeda and Al-Qaeda backed terrorists. VP-4 also had the opportunity to conduct the P-3C's primary mission, ASW, against diesel and nuclear powered submarines, completing this deployment by flying over 4,000 mishap-free flight hours and completing over 800 missions. In 2005, VP-4 successfully completed a wartime deployment to the Middle East and Western Pacific, carrying out a wide variety of missions ranging from humanitarian assistance and disaster relief support missions to the Indian Ocean tsunami victims, to direct support of ground combat operations in support of Operation Iraqi Freedom in Iraq and Operation Enduring Freedom in Afghanistan. In December 2006, the squadron deployed to Misawa AB and Kadena AB, and to the Philippines, in support of Operation Enduring Freedom in the Philippines. This was followed by a return to Iraq in support of Operation Iraqi Freedom in November 2008. On this deployment, VP-4 supplied detachments in support of numerous joint and multinational exercises at RAF Lakenheath, United Kingdom; RAF Kinloss, Scotland; and NAS Sigonella, Sicily. This experience proved invaluable during the ensuing interdeployment readiness cycle, when VP-4 successfully planned, hosted, and executed the world's largest joint, multinational military exercise, RIMPAC 2010. Following completion of a series of detachment operations, VP-4 departed MCB Kaneohe Bay for a split site deployment in November 2010, supporting assets in both the US 5th Fleet and US 7th Fleet AORs. Following the catastrophic 2011 Tōhoku earthquake and tsunami of 11 March 2011, VP-4 forward-deployed to Misawa AB in fewer than 24 hours and re-established CTG 72.4 as an operational entity and the first US aviation unit on station for Operation Tomodachi, with VP-4 subsequently providing 254 flight hours of humanitarian and disaster relief support to the Japanese people.

In November 2012, VP-4 was deployed to the US 6th Fleet in the Mediterranean, operating from NAS Sigonella, NS Rota, Spain and numerous other locations in support of US Naval Forces Europe, US Naval Forces Africa, NATO and Unified Combatant Commanders. As of 2013, the squadron has surpassed over 40 years of mishap-free flying, with over 254,000 flight hours.

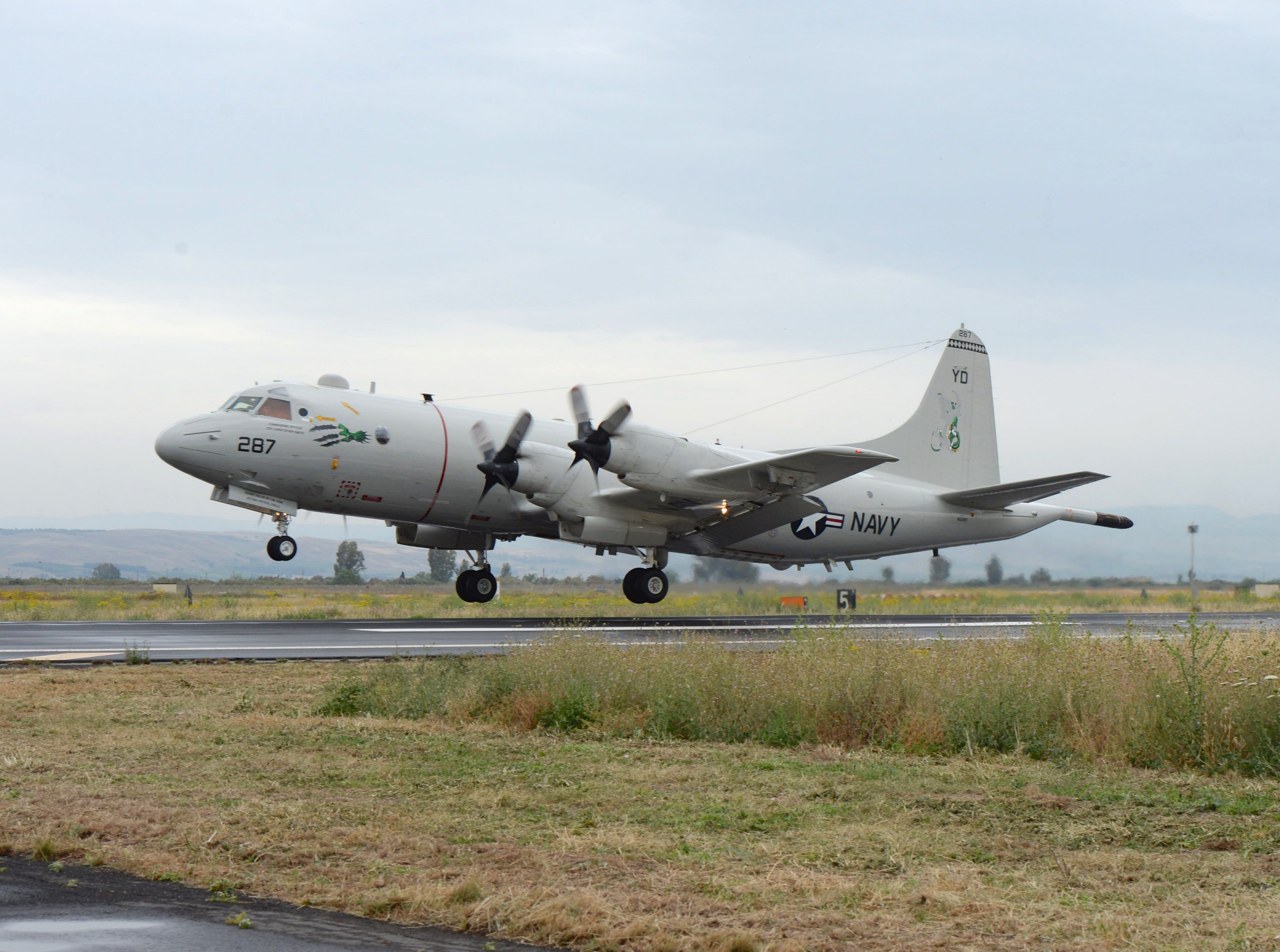
VP-4 P-3C takes off from NAS Sigonella, May 2016

VP-4 deployed in the Fifth and Sixth fleet from June 2014 to February 2015. The squadron began deployment with an operational detachment to Keflavik, Iceland, in support of emergent Theater ASW tasking. Additionally, VP-4 provided support to the Organization for the Prohibition of Chemical Weapons, enabling the safe destruction of chemical weapons in the international waters of the Mediterranean Sea. VP-4 simultaneously took part in 5 exercises located in Bulgaria, Finland, Spain and Turkey. VP-4 returned home in February 2015 to prepare for what would be their final P-3C Orion deployment.

In March 2016, VP-4 departed Oahu for the last time as a Hawaii squadron. Their 'Aloha Deployment' was a busy one that saw personnel spread across three continents and twelve different countries. While on deployment, VP-4 executed a Permanent Duty Station Change (PDSC) to Naval Air Station Whidbey Island, returning home in September.

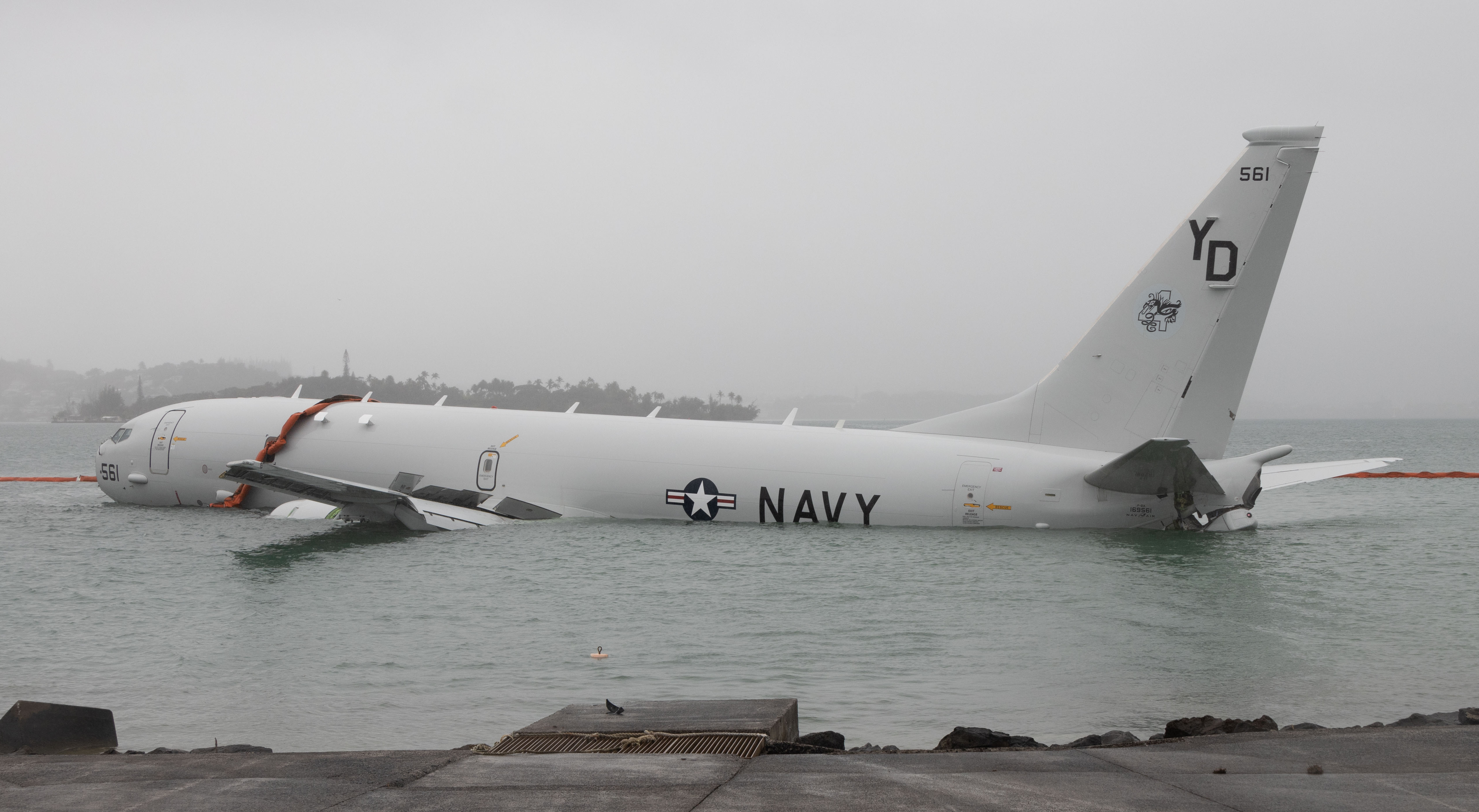
VP-4 P-8A in the sea off MCAS Kaneohe Bay in November 2023

VP-4 become the first squadron at NAS Whidbey Island to convert to the P-8 Poseidon in October 2016. On 2 April 2018 the squadron departed for Kadena Air Base, Okinawa, Japan for its inaugural deployment. On 21 November 2023, a P-8A of VP-4 overran the runway at Kaneohe Bay Marine Corps Air Station and came to rest in Kaneohe Bay itself. There were no deaths but the people on board the plane were forced to swim back to base.

== Operations ==
=== Vietnam War ===
Starting 26 March 1965, the squadron began a split-site deployment to MCAS Iwakuni, Japan, with detachments at various dates located at Naval Air Facility Tan Son Nhut Air Base, South Vietnam; Naval Station Sangley Point and NAS Cubi Point, Philippines.

31 January 1967: The squadron again deployed to WestPac at Iwakuni, Japan, and provided support to Task Force 72 during Operation Market Time (coastal patrols off the coasts of South Vietnam). Detachments were maintained at NS Sangley Point and NAF Naha, Okinawa. Upon completion of deployment, Commander Patrol Forces, Seventh Fleet presented the squadron a letter of commendation for its support of operations and assistance in the destruction of an enemy trawler carrying arms destined for the Viet Cong.

17 April 1967: A VP-4 P-3A Orion flying patrol off the coast of Korea was fired upon by an infiltrating North Korean speedboat. The damaged aircraft landed safely after reporting the vessel's location. South Korean forces sank the intruder shortly thereafter. Lieutenant Commander C. W. Larzelere III, the PPC, received a Navy Commendation Medal for his handling of the emergency while under fire.

28 April 1967: A VP-4 P-3A Orion (BuNo. 151365) flown by Lieutenant C. D. Burton was lost at sea with all hands off the coast of Tsushima Island, Japan.

1 August 1968: VP-4 was deployed to WestPac under FAW-6 at Iwakuni, Japan. Patrols were conducted in the South China Sea, Sea of Japan, Korea, the Philippine Islands and Guam. Detachments were sent to Cam Ranh Bay, in support of Yankee Team and Market Time operations. Yankee Team was a joint U.S. Air Force and U.S. Navy operation begun in 1963 that provided low-level aerial reconnaissance of suspected Communist infiltration routes in eastern and southern Laos.

=== Desert Shield/Desert Storm ===
On 10 November 1990, as a normal rotation, NAS Barbers Point based VP-4 (with P-3C Update I's) relieved VP-1 at Diego Garcia and RAFO Al Masirah. VP-4 C.O. Commander Bob Cunningham, took over CTG 72.8 and his X.O. Commander Carlos Badger, assumed the detachment(det). at RAFO Al Masirah.

During one 34-hour period, P-3s provided the detection and target locating information that resulted in a substantial reduction in the Iraqi Navy's offense of capability. A group of 15 Iraqi vessels heading for Maridim Island, an outpost in Kuwaiti hands was detected by VP-4s Crew Five, who vectored strike aircraft against the force, resulting in five ships sunk and seven more damaged. This effort ended what would be Iraqis last seaborne assault.

Hours later, VP-4s Crew 2 detected a group of Iraqi vessels attempting a rapid transit from Iraqi ports around Bubiyan Island, apparently trying to reach the safety of Iranian territorial waters. P-3s from VPs 4, 19, and 46 provided the target locations for the strike aircraft which destroyed 11 Iraqi vessels in what has been named the Battle of Bubiyan.

Between 25–27 March 2006, a series of anti-submarine warfare exercises were held in Hawaiian waters that included Carrier Strike Group Nine, the nuclear-powered attack submarines USS Seawolf, USS Cheyenne, USS Greeneville, USS Tucson, and USS Pasadena, as well as land-based P-3 Orions from patrol squadrons VP-9, and VP-47, and VP-4.

== Aircraft assignments ==
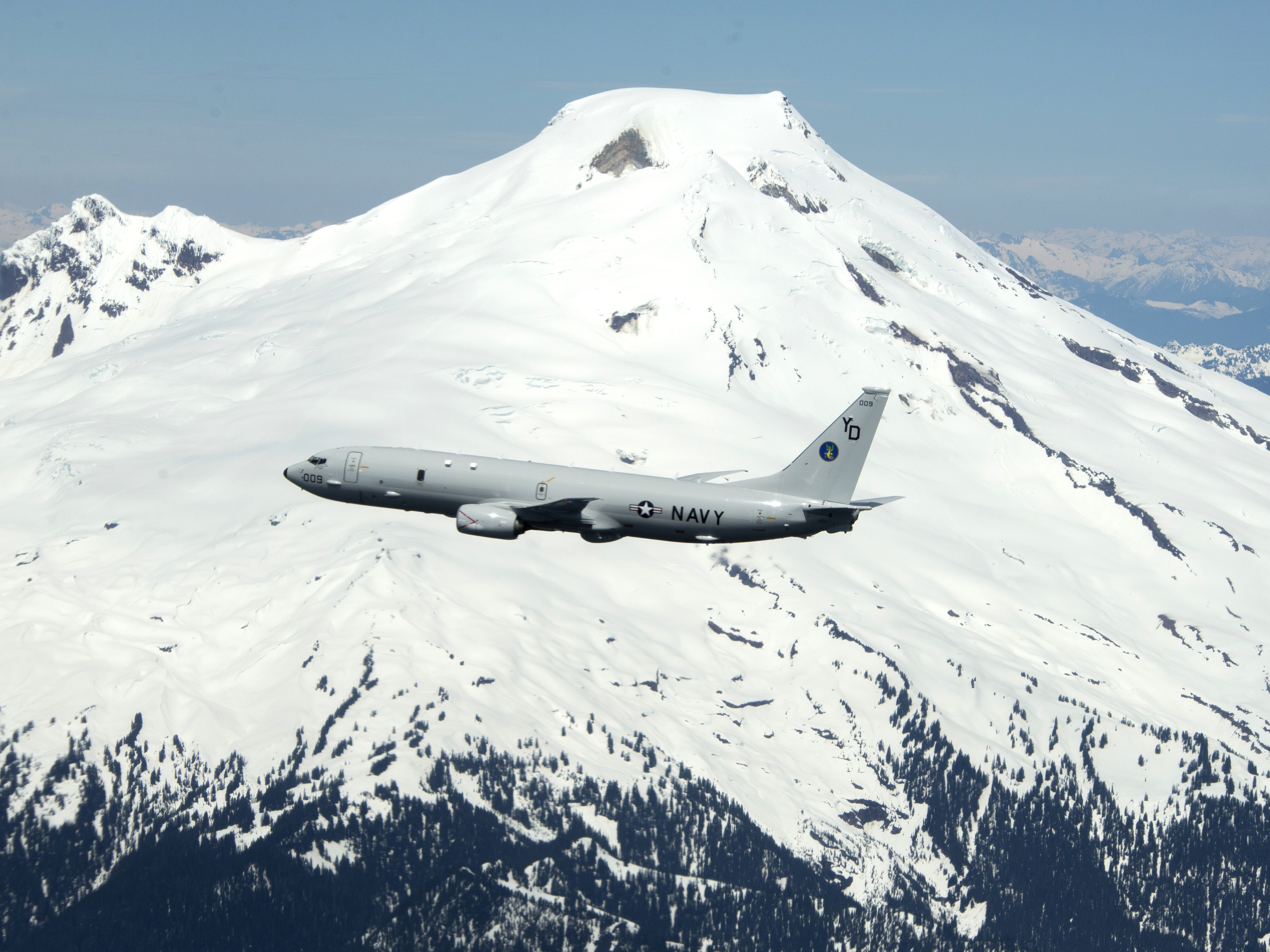
A VP-4 P-8A in May 2017.

The squadron was assigned the following aircraft, effective on the dates shown:

- PV-1 – July 1943
- PV-2 – July 1945
- P2V-1 – September 1947
- P2V-2 – January 1948
- P2V-5 – March 1953
- P2V-5F – March 1956
- P2V-7/SP-2H – September 1962
- P-3A – October 1966
- P-3B-MOD (Super Bee) – February 1979
- P-3C – March 1984
- P-3C UI – November 1989
- P-3C UIIIR – 1992
- P-8A – October 2016

== Home port assignments ==
The squadron was assigned to these home ports, effective on the dates shown:

- NAS Alameda, California – 1 July 1943
- Naval Air Station Whidbey Island, Washington – 1 November 1944
- NAB Eniwetok – 27 June 1945
- NAB Tinian – 1946
- NAS North Island, California – September 1946
- NAS Miramar, California – November 1947
- Naval Air Station Whidbey Island – January 1948
- NAF Naha, Okinawa – 13 August 1956
- NAS Barbers Point, Hawaii – November 1963
- Marine Corps Base Hawaii – 1998
- Naval Air Station Whidbey Island – September 2016

== See also ==
- History of the United States Navy
- List of United States Navy aircraft squadrons
- List of squadrons in the Dictionary of American Naval Aviation Squadrons
- List of Lockheed P-3 Orion variants
