= James F. Caldwell Jr. =

United States Navy admiral

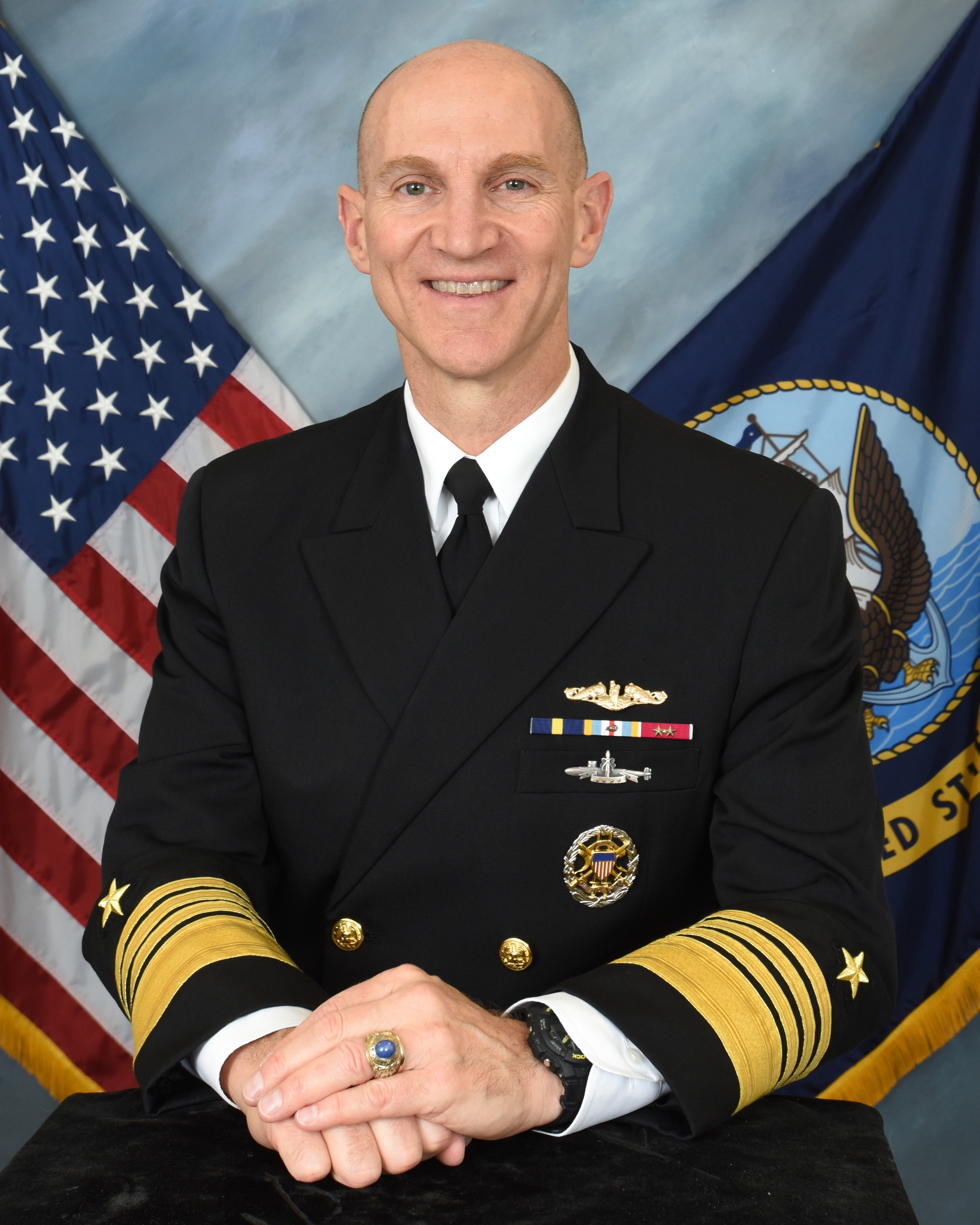
- Born: March 24, 1959 (age 67); Green Bay, Wisconsin, U.S.
- Alma mater: United States Naval Academy (BS); Naval Postgraduate School (MS)
- Relatives: Admiral Jehu V. Chase (great-grandfather)
- Military career
- Allegiance: United States
- Branch: United States Navy
- Service years: 1981–2024
- Rank: Admiral
- Commands: Director, Naval Reactors; Naval Inspector General; Submarine Force, United States Pacific Fleet; Submarine Group 9; Submarine Development Squadron 12; USS Jacksonville (SSN-699)
- Awards: Navy Distinguished Service Medal (3); Defense Superior Service Medal (2); Legion of Merit (3)
- James F. Caldwell's voice Caldwell's opening statement at a Senate Armed Services subcommittee hearing on the FY2024 Navy nuclear program budget request Recorded April 18, 2023

James Franklin "Frank" Caldwell Jr. (born March 24, 1959) is a retired admiral in the United States Navy who last served as director of the Naval Nuclear Propulsion Program, a job once held by the program's creator, Admiral Hyman G. Rickover. He previously served as Naval Inspector General.

From August 31, 2022 to his retirement, Caldwell was the Navy's Old Goat, the longest serving United States Naval Academy graduate on active duty, having received the award and accompanying title from Admiral William K. Lescher.

== Naval career ==
Caldwell received his commission graduating with distinction from the United States Naval Academy in 1981 with a Bachelor of Science in Marine Engineering; he is a fifth-generation Academy graduate. He holds a Master of Science in operations research from the Naval Postgraduate School.

Caldwell’s early sea tours include serving in both the Atlantic and Pacific Fleets. His operational assignments include duty as a division officer on USS Boston (SSN-703), engineering officer on USS Alabama (SSBN-731) (GOLD), and executive officer on USS Buffalo (SSN-715).

Caldwell commanded USS Jacksonville (SSN-699) home ported in Norfolk, Virginia; Submarine Development Squadron 12 in New London, Connecticut; and Submarine Group 9 in Bangor, Washington. In his most recent afloat command, he commanded SUBPAC (Submarine Forces Pacific) as COMSUBPAC.

Ashore, Caldwell served on the Pacific Fleet Nuclear Propulsion Examining Board, and later as Undersea Warfare Requirements officer on the staff of Commander in Chief, U.S. Pacific Fleet. He also served as senior member of the Naval Submarine Force’s Tactical Readiness Evaluation Team, on the Joint Staff as deputy director for Politico-Military Affairs for Europe, the North Atlantic Treaty Organization, Russia and Africa, and deputy commander for U.S. Strategic Command's Joint Functional Component Command for Global Strike in Omaha, Nebraska.

On August 5, 2015, Caldwell was confirmed by the US Senate to become admiral. Caldwell assumed his duties as the seventh director of Naval Reactors on August 14, 2015, normally an eight-year term.

== Awards and decorations ==

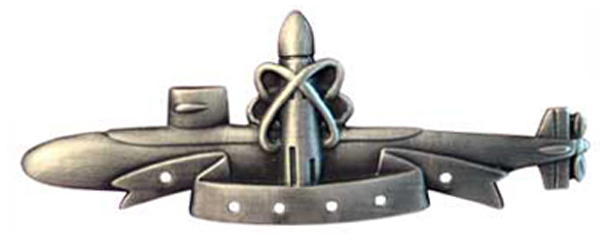

Officer Submarine Warfare insignia
Navy Distinguished Service Medal with 2 gold award stars
Defense Superior Service Medal with one bronze oak leaf cluster	Legion of Merit with 2 gold award stars	Meritorious Service Medal with gold award star
Navy and Marine Corps Commendation Medal with 3 gold award stars	Navy and Marine Corps Achievement Medal with 2 gold award stars	Joint Meritorious Unit Award
Navy Meritorious Unit Commendation with 3 bronze service stars	Navy "E" Ribbon with three Battle E awards	Navy Expeditionary Medal with 2 bronze service stars
National Defense Service Medal with 1 bronze service star	Global War on Terrorism Service Medal	Navy Sea Service Deployment Ribbon with 3 bronze service stars
Navy Arctic Service Ribbon	Coast Guard Special Operations Service Ribbon	Navy Pistol Marksmanship Ribbon with sharpshooter device
Silver SSBN Deterrent Patrol insignia (5 awards)
Command at Sea insignia
Joint Chiefs of Staff Identification Badge

Military offices
Preceded by Douglas J. McAneny	Commander, Submarine Force, U.S. Pacific Fleet; 2010–2013	Succeeded by Phillip G. Sawyer
Preceded by James P. Wisecup	Naval Inspector General; 2013–2015	Succeeded by Herman A. Shelanski
Preceded by John M. Richardson	Director, Naval Nuclear Propulsion Program; 2015–2024	Succeeded by William J. Houston
