= Douglas J. McAneny =

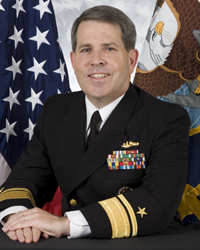
- Born: 1955 (age 70–71)
- Military career
- Branch: United States Navy
- Service years: 1978–2012
- Rank: Rear Admiral
- Commands: National War College; Submarine Force, U.S. Pacific Fleet; Submarine Group 7; USS Philadelphia
- Awards: Defense Superior Service Medal (2); Legion of Merit (4); Meritorious Service Medal (3); Navy Commendation Medal; Navy Achievement Medal (2)

Rear Admiral Douglas John McAneny, USN (Ret.) (born 1955) serves as HDR's Federal Business Group Director. He is responsible for guiding and growing HDR's federal government business practice across all HDR operating companies. He serves on both the architecture and engineering company executive teams and is a member of the Board of Directors of HDR Environmental Operations and Construction (EOC). McAneny has extensive command experience having served in a variety of operational assignments. His final at sea assignment was as Commander Submarine Forces Pacific. In this role McAneny was responsible for attack and strategic ballistic missile submarines which operated from the west coast of the United States to the Suez Canal conducting a broad array of missions in support of critical national security objectives. Rear Admiral McAneny served as commandant, National War College, National Defense University, Washington, D.C. in his final post and was previously the Commander, Submarine Force U.S. Pacific Fleet.

== Education ==
Rear Admiral Douglas J. McAneny is a 1978 graduate of the University of Nebraska–Lincoln with a Bachelor of Science degree, majoring in civil engineering and holds a Masters of Arts degree in Economics from the University of Oklahoma. Upon completion of the Lincoln Naval Reserve Officers Training Unit two-year program, he was commissioned as a U.S. Navy ensign.

== Career ==
McAneny entered the Navy in May 1978 and qualified in submarines, earning his gold dolphins in May 1981. His early sea tours included assignments as Division Officer, USS Trepang (SSN-674); Engineer, USS Tunny (SSN-682); Executive Officer, USS Drum (SSN-677); and Officer-in-Charge of Moored Training Ship (MTS-635).

McAneny's first command assignment was as commanding officer of USS Philadelphia (SSN-690). During his command, the ship was awarded three consecutive Battle "E" Awards.

Tours ashore include assignments as Flag Lieutenant, Commander Submarine Group 2; a Joint tour at the U.S. Strategic Command serving as Plans and Policy Directorate (J5); Assistant to the Director for Training, Personnel, and Policy matters for the Director Naval Nuclear Propulsion Program (NAVSEA 08); Commander, Submarine Squadron 11 with additional duties as Commander Submarine Force U. S. Pacific Fleet Representative West Coast; as Executive Assistant and Senior Naval Aide to the Commander, U. S. Pacific Fleet headquartered in Pearl Harbor Hawaii; and Deputy Director for Politico-Military Affairs (Europe/NATO/Russia/Africa) (J5) on the Joint Staff in Washington D.C.

He served as the 40th Commander, Submarine Group 7, Yokosuka, Japan, from December 2006 to June 2008. During that assignment, he was responsible for coordinating and controlling submarine activities covering nearly 48 percent of the earth's surface in the 7th and 5th Fleet areas of responsibility. He was Commander, Submarine Force, U.S. Pacific Fleet, until taking his final active duty position as commandant of the National War College.

In 2013 McAneny joined HDR as the Federal Business Group Director. In his role with HDR McAneny is responsible for guiding and growing HDR's federal business practice across all HDR operating companies. He serves on both the architecture and engineering company executive teams and leads a team delivering a broad array of professional services to Federal clients around the world. HDR is an Architectural and Engineering firm founded in 1917 and headquartered in Omaha, Nebraska. HDR specializes in engineering, architecture, environmental and construction services.

== Awards ==
His personal decorations include the Defense Superior Service Medal (Two Awards), Legion of Merit (Four Awards), Meritorious Service Medal (Three Awards), Navy Commendation Medal, and the Navy Achievement Medal (Two Awards).
