= PXO =

PXO may refer to:

- Prospective Executive Officer, in Prospective Commanding Officer
- Professor X the Overseer, a hip-hop musician
- IATA airport code for Porto Santo Airport
- Parallax Online, a provider of free services over the internet in FreeSpace 2
- Public Works Department in List of U.S. Navy acronyms
- Patient Experience Officer
