= James Hecker =

U.S. Air Force general

James B. Hecker
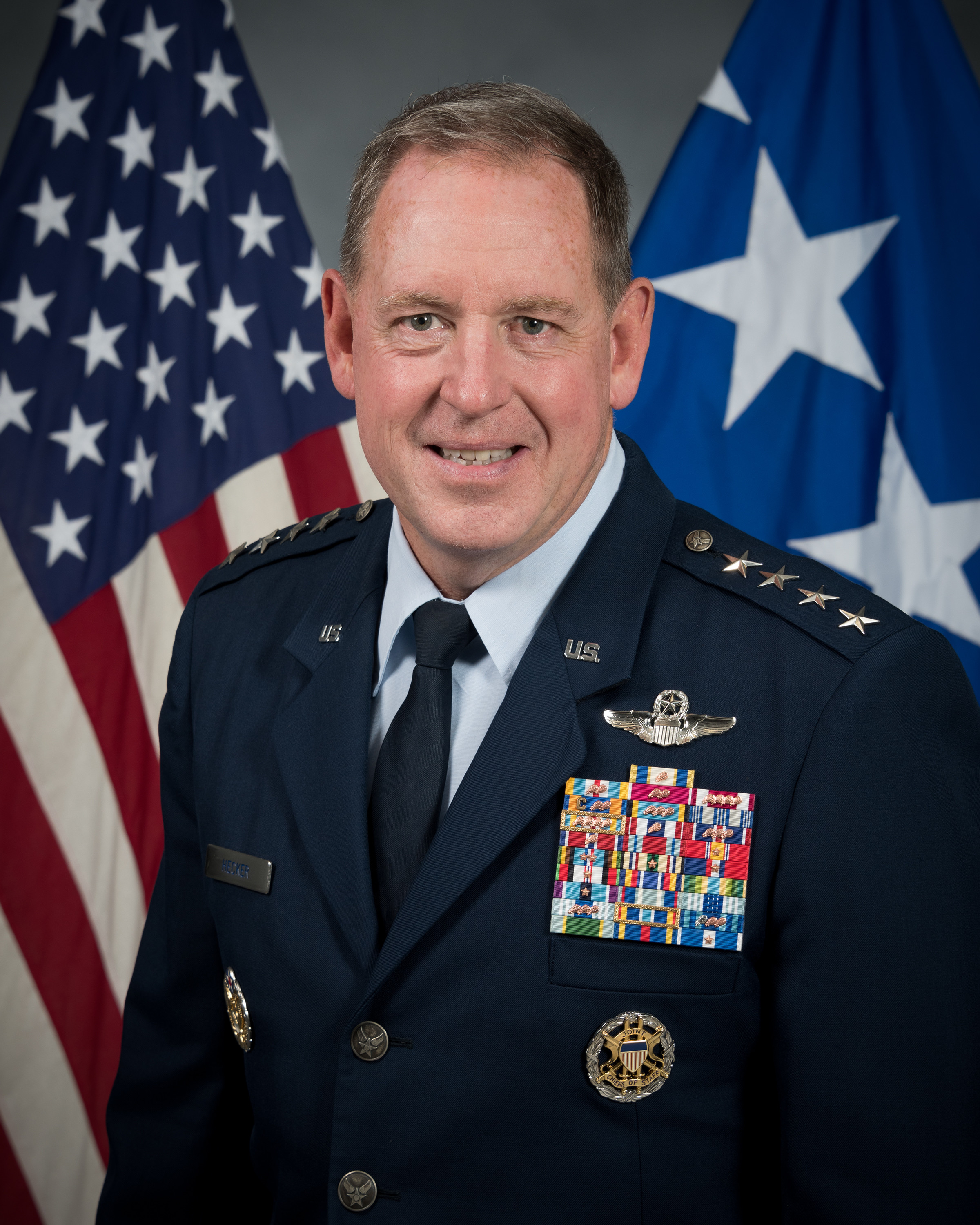
- Hecker in 2022
- Born: California, United States
- Military career
- Allegiance: United States
- Branch: United States Air Force
- Service years: 1989–2025
- Rank: General
- Commands: United States Air Forces in Europe – Air Forces Africa; Allied Air Command; Air University; 9th Air and Space Expeditionary Task Force-Afghanistan; NATO Air Command-Afghanistan; Nineteenth Air Force; 18th Wing; 432nd Wing; 3rd Operations Group; 27th Fighter Squadron
- Conflicts: War in Afghanistan
- Awards: Air Force Distinguished Service Medal (2); Defense Superior Service Medal (3); Legion of Merit (3)

James B. Hecker is a retired four-star United States Air Force general who last served as the commander of United States Air Forces in Europe – Air Forces Africa and Allied Air Command from 2022 to 2025. Before that, he served as the commander and president of Air University from 2019 to 2022. and also previously served as the vice director for operations of the Joint Staff.

Previeously he also commanded the 9th Air and Space Expeditionary Task Force - Afghanistan.

He is from Arnold, California and graduated from the United States Air Force Academy in 1989.

== Awards and decorations ==
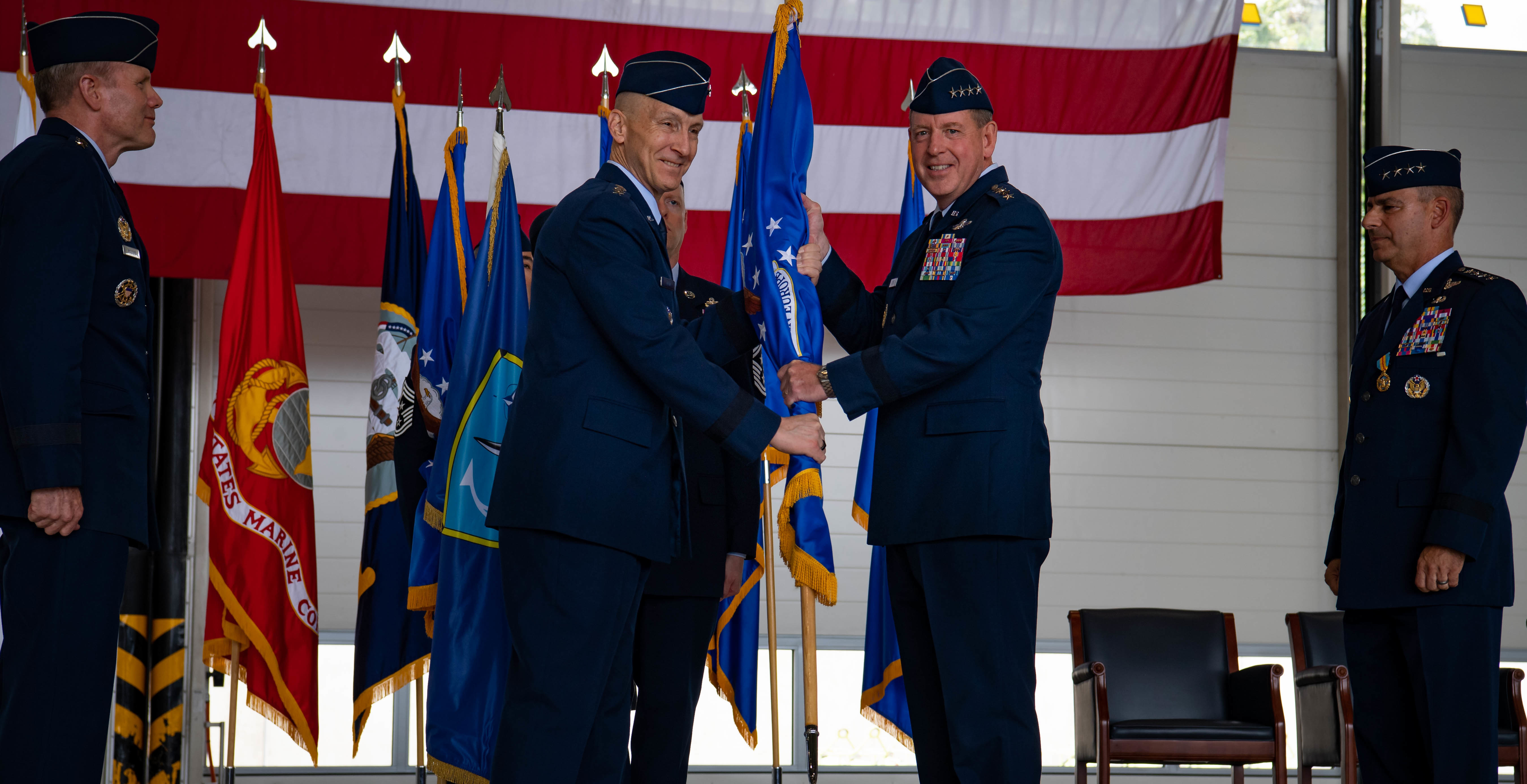
Gen Hecker assumes command U.S. Air Forces in Europe – Air Forces Africa on June 27, 2022.

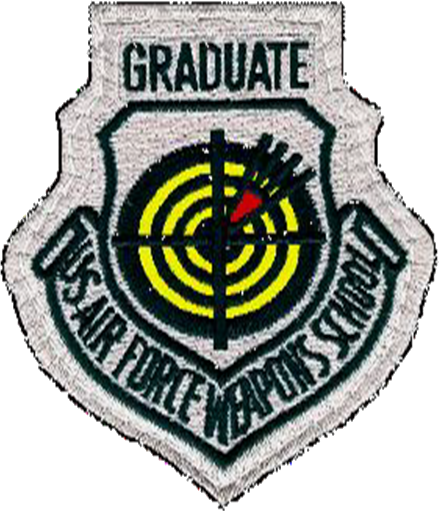
US Air Force Command Pilot Badge
Office of the Joint Chiefs of Staff Identification Badge
Air Staff Badge
Weapons School Graduate Patch

Air Force Distinguished Service Medal with one bronze oak leaf cluster
Defense Superior Service Medal with two oak leaf clusters
Legion of Merit with two oak leaf clusters
Meritorious Service Medal with four oak leaf clusters
Air Medal with "C" device and two oak leaf clusters
Aerial Achievement Medal with three oak leaf clusters
Air Force Achievement Medal
Joint Meritorious Unit Award with four oak leaf clusters
Air Force Meritorious Unit Award with oak leaf cluster
Air Force Outstanding Unit Award with three oak leaf clusters
Air Force Organizational Excellence Award with oak leaf cluster
Combat Readiness Medal
National Defense Service Medal with one bronze service star
Armed Forces Expeditionary Medal with two service stars
Southwest Asia Service Medal with service star
Kosovo Campaign Medal with service star
Afghanistan Campaign Medal with service star
Global War on Terrorism Service Medal
Armed Forces Service Medal
Humanitarian Service Medal with service star
Air and Space Campaign Medal
Air Force Overseas Short Tour Service Ribbon
Air Force Overseas Long Tour Service Ribbon with three oak leaf clusters
Air Force Expeditionary Service Ribbon with gold frame
Air Force Longevity Service Award with one silver and two bronze oak leaf clusters
Small Arms Expert Marksmanship Ribbon
Air Force Training Ribbon
NATO Medal for Kosovo with service star

== Effective dates of promotions ==
Rank	Date
Second lieutenant	31 May 1989
First lieutenant	31 May 1991
Captain	31 May 1993
Major	1 July 1999
Lieutenant colonel	1 March 2002
Colonel	1 January 2007
Brigadier general	2 August 2013
Major general	3 May 2016
Lieutenant general	22 November 2019
General	27 June 2022

Military offices
Preceded by Matthew H. Molloy	Commander of the 18th Wing; 2013–2015	Succeeded by Barry Cornish
Preceded by Scott J. Zobrist	Director of Plans, Programs, and Requirements of Air Combat Command; 2015	Succeeded by Jeff Taliaferro
Preceded by Michael A. Keltz	Commander of Nineteenth Air Force; 2015–2017	Succeeded by Patrick J. Doherty
Preceded by Jeff Taliaferro	Deputy Commander for Air of Combined Joint Task Force – Operation Inherent Resolve; 2017–2018	Succeeded by Barre Seguin
Preceded by James J. Malloy	Vice Director for Operations of the Joint Staff; 2018–2019	Succeeded by Jeff Taliaferro
Preceded by Anthony J. Cotton	Commander and President of Air University; 2019–2022	Succeeded by Andrea Tullos
Preceded by Jeffrey L. Harrigian	Commander of United States Air Forces in Europe – Air Forces Africa; 2022–2025	Succeeded by Jason Hinds; Acting
