= Jeff Taliaferro =

U.S. Air Force general

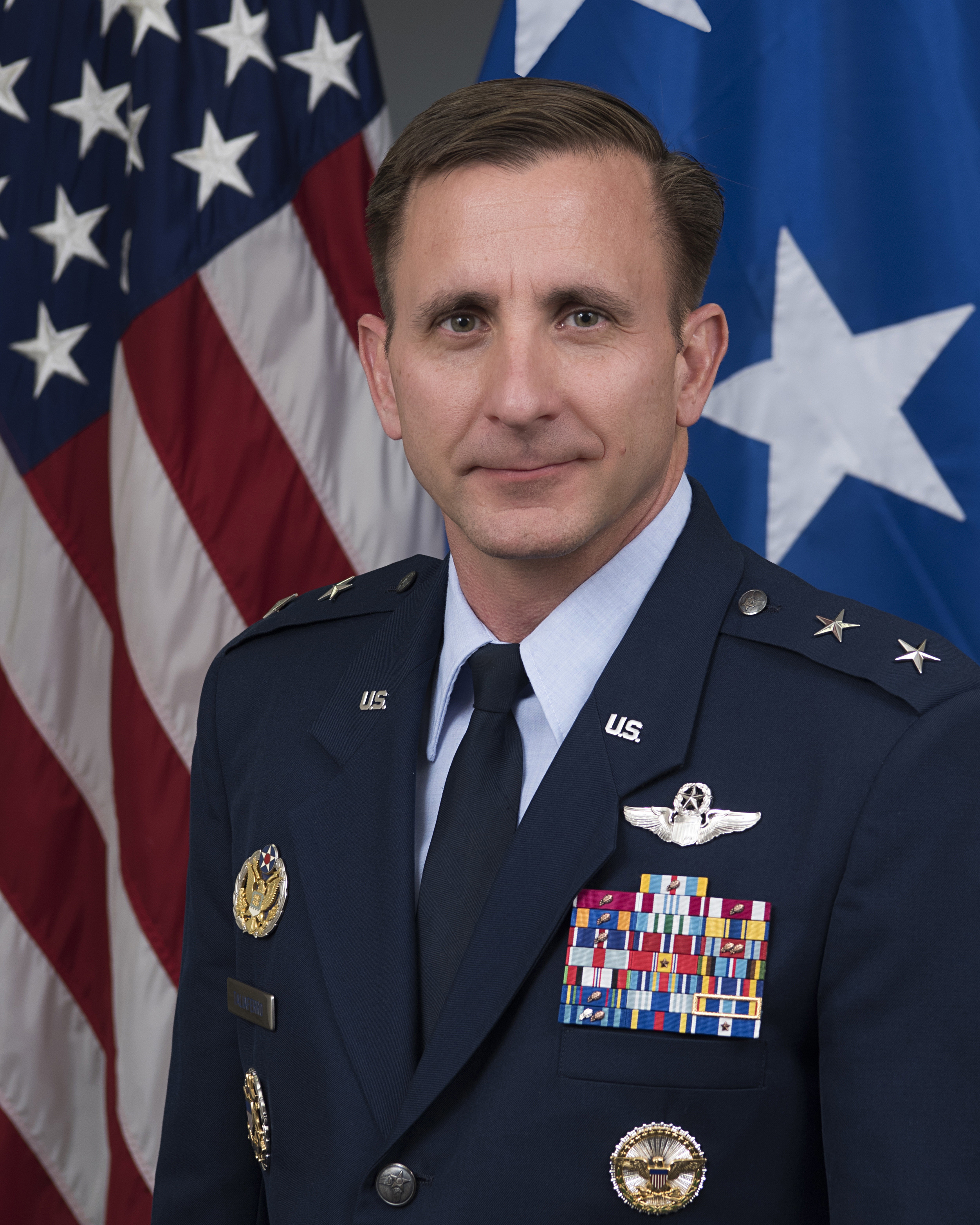
- Military career
- Allegiance: United States
- Branch: United States Air Force
- Service years: 1989–2021
- Rank: Major General
- Commands: 9th Air and Space Expeditionary Task Force-Afghanistan; 28th Bomb Wing; 28th Bomb Squadron
- Conflicts: War in Afghanistan
- Awards: Defense Superior Service Medal (2); Legion of Merit (2)

Jeffrey Bartlett Taliaferro is a retired United States Air Force major general who last served as the vice director for operations of the Joint Staff.

Military offices
Preceded by Scott A. Vander Hamm	Commander of the 28th Bomb Wing; 2009–2011	Succeeded by Mark E. Weatherington
Preceded by Scott D. West	Commander of the 9th Air and Space Expeditionary Task Force-Afghanistan; 2016–2017	Succeeded by James Hecker
