= Andrew A. Croft =

U.S. Air Force general

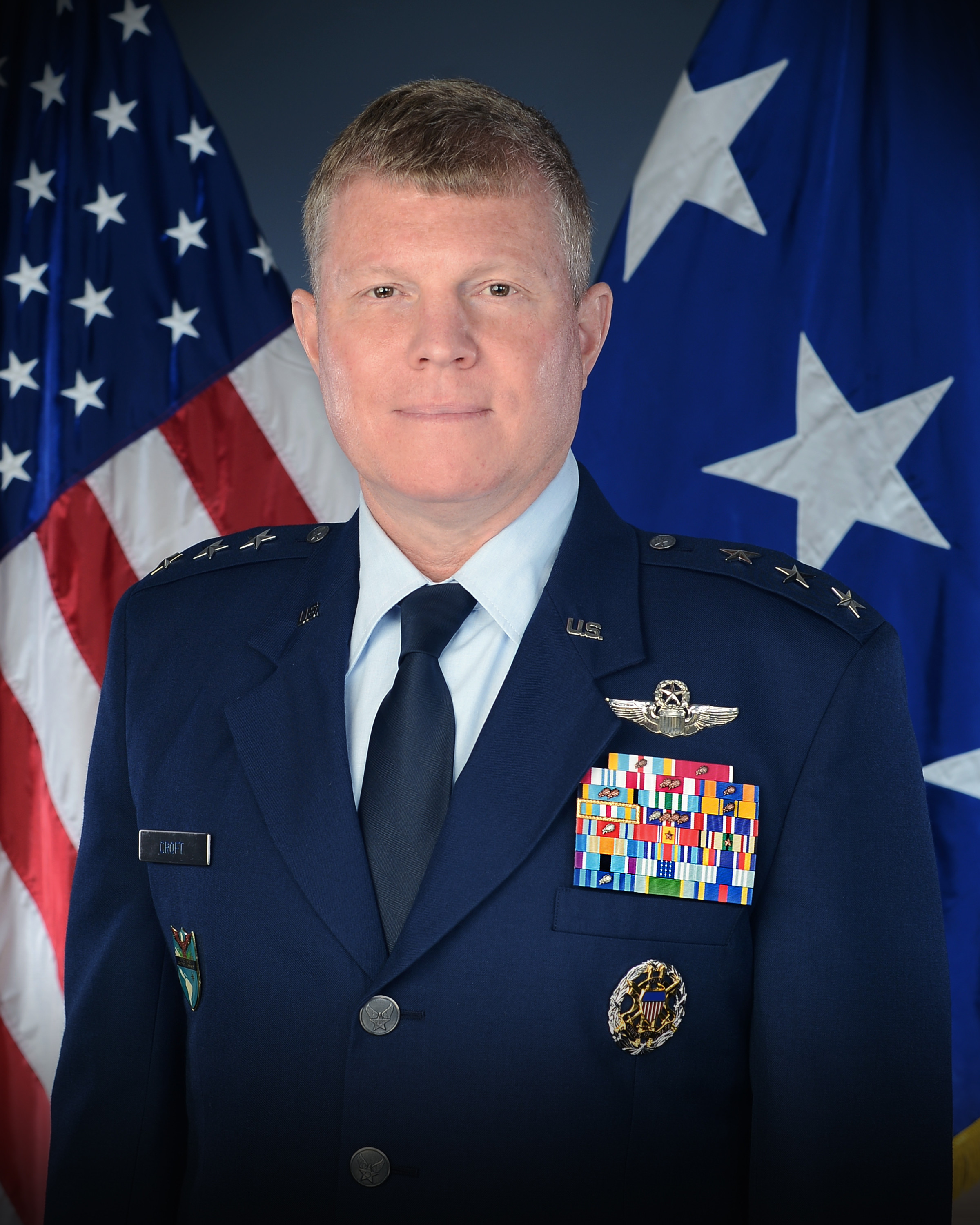
- Born: 1965 (age 60–61)
- Military career
- Allegiance: United States
- Branch: United States Air Force
- Service years: 1989–2023
- Rank: Lieutenant general
- Commands: Twelfth Air Force; 49th Wing; 12th Operations Group; 433rd Weapons Squadron
- Conflicts: Operation Inherent Resolve
- Awards: Defense Superior Service Medal (2); Legion of Merit (2)

Andrew A. Croft (born 1965) is a retired United States Air Force lieutenant general who served as the military deputy commander of United States Southern Command from 2021 to 2023. Croft was commissioned through the ROTC program at University of California, Los Angeles in 1988.

In July 2020, the United States Senate confirmed his promotion to lieutenant general and nomination to become the military deputy commander of the United States Southern Command, replacing Lieutenant General Michael T. Plehn.

Croft retired from the Air Force on February 25, 2023.

== Awards and decorations ==
US Air Force Command Pilot Badge
Office of the Joint Chiefs of Staff Identification Badge
United States Southern Command Identification Badge

Defense Superior Service Medal with one bronze oak leaf cluster
Legion of Merit with oak leaf cluster
Defense Meritorious Service Medal
Meritorious Service Medal with two oak leaf clusters
Air Medal with oak leaf cluster
Aerial Achievement Medal with two oak leaf clusters
Joint Service Commendation Medal
Air Force Commendation Medal with oak leaf cluster
Joint Meritorious Unit Award
Air Force Outstanding Unit Award with one silver and three bronze oak leaf clusters
Air Force Outstanding Unit Award (second ribbon to denote tenth award)
Combat Readiness Medal with silver oak leaf cluster
National Defense Service Medal with one bronze service star
Southwest Asia Service Medal with service star
Inherent Resolve Campaign Medal
Global War on Terrorism Expeditionary Medal
Global War on Terrorism Service Medal
Humanitarian Service Medal
Air Force Overseas Short Tour Service Ribbon
Air Force Overseas Long Tour Service Ribbon
Air Force Longevity Service Award with one silver and two bronze oak leaf clusters
Small Arms Expert Marksmanship Ribbon
Air Force Training Ribbon

== Effective dates of promotions ==
Rank	Date
Second lieutenant	January 10, 1989
First lieutenant	January 10, 1991
Captain	January 10, 1993
Major	June 1, 2000
Lieutenant colonel	April 1, 2004
Colonel	August 1, 2009
Brigadier general	June 10, 2015
Major general	August 3, 2018
Lieutenant general	December 28, 2020

Military offices
Preceded by David A. Krumm	Commander of the 49th Wing; 2012–2014	Succeeded by Robert E. Kiebler
Preceded by ???	Vice Director of Operations of the North American Aerospace Defense Command; 2014–2015	Succeeded by Kenneth P. Ekman
Preceded by ???	Director of Plans, Programs, Requirements and Assessments of the Air Education and Training Command; 2015–2017	Succeeded by William A. Spangenthal
Preceded by ???	Deputy Commanding General for Air of the Combined Joint Forces Land Component Command; 2017–2018	Succeeded by Matthew Isler
Preceded by Mark D. Kelly	Commander of the Twelfth Air Force; 2018–2020	Succeeded by Barry Cornish
Preceded by Barry Cornish	Special Assistant to the Commander of the Air Combat Command; 2020–2021	Succeeded by Stephen C. Williams
Preceded by Michael T. Plehn	Military Deputy Commander of the United States Southern Command; 2021–2023	Succeeded by Alvin Holsey
