= Michael T. Plehn =

United States Air Force general

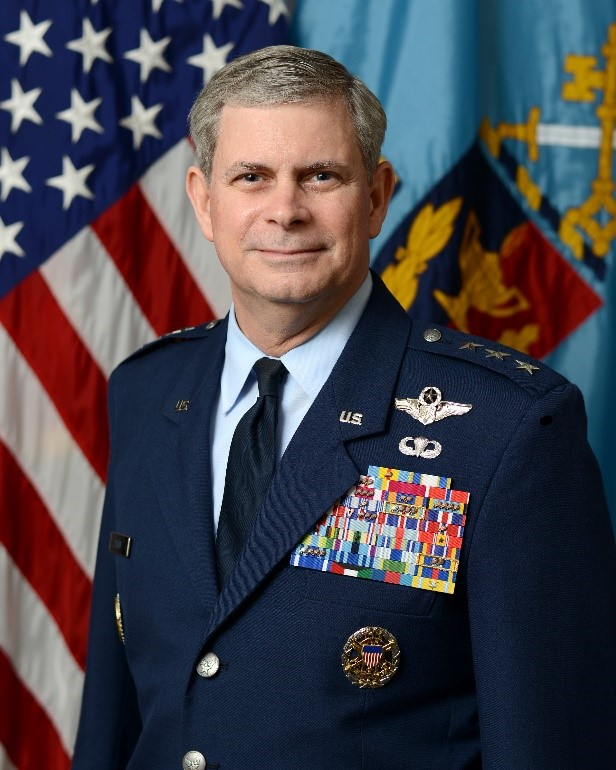
- Born: 1964 (age 61–62)
- Military career
- Branch: United States Air Force
- Service years: 1988–2024
- Rank: Lieutenant General
- Commands: National Defense University; 1st Special Operations Wing; 27th Operations Group; 19th Special Operations Squadron
- Conflicts: Gulf War
- Awards: Defense Distinguished Service Medal; Air Force Distinguished Service Medal; Defense Superior Service Medal (3); Legion of Merit; Bronze Star Medal

Michael Todd Plehn (born 1964) is a retired United States Air Force lieutenant general who last served as the 17th president of the National Defense University from 2021 to 2024. He previously served as deputy commander of the United States Southern Command from 2018 to 2020. He is a graduate of the United States Air Force Academy.

== Education ==
Michael Plehn graduated from Miami Southridge High School in 1983, he then attended the United States Air Force Academy Preparatory School in Colorado Springs where he graduated with military distinction and received a bachelor degree in Astronautical Engineering in 1988. He holds a Masters degree in National Security and Strategic Studies from the Naval War College , Masters of Aerospace Science from Embry-Riddle Aeronautical University and a Masters of Airpower Art and Science from the School of Advanced Air and Space Studies.

== Career ==
From August 1990 until November 1994, Plehn was an Electronic Warfare Officer on the AC-130 Gunship at the 16th Special Operations Squadron, where he remained until July 1997 when he took on the role as Aide-de-camp to the Commander at the Air Force Special Operations Command (AFSOC). In 2000, Plehn moved to the Headquarters U.S. Air Force in Washington as Team Chief of the Global Engagement of the Directorate of Strategic Planning and he was the Air Staff in Strategy and Policy as well as the speechwriter for the Air Force Vice Chief of Staff in 2001. In 2006 and 2007, he was the Chief Joint Improvised Explosive Device Defeat Organization. He served in the Office of the Secretary of Defense in the Middle East Policy from 2013 to 2015.Until 2018, he was the Deputy Commander for Air Force Special Operations Command at Hurlburt Field, Florida. He is the President of Plehn & Associated LLC. In February 2021, Plehn was appointed the 17th president of the National Defense University (NDU) succeeding Vice Admiral Frederick J. Roegge. He was the Military Deputy Commander of the U.S. Southern Command (USSOUTHCOM). As such, Plehn participated in the Colombia-U.S Exercise Vita which took place in March 2020 in the Guajira Peninsula in Columbia. In March 2023, Plehn and Dr. Robert Egnell published an article in PRISM entitled "If You Want Peace…".

== Awards and decorations ==
Air Force Master Navigator Badge
Basic Parachutist Badge
Joint Chiefs of Staff Identification Badge
Office of the Secretary of Defense Identification Badge

Defense Distinguished Service Medal
Air Force Distinguished Service Medal
Defense Superior Service Medal with two bronze oak leaf clusters
Legion of Merit
Bronze Star Medal
Defense Meritorious Service Medal with one bronze oak leaf cluster
Meritorious Service Medal with three oak leaf clusters
Air Medal with two oak leaf clusters
Aerial Achievement Medal with four oak leaf clusters
Air Force Commendation Medal
Air Force Achievement Medal with oak leaf cluster
Joint Meritorious Unit Award with one silver and one bronze oak leaf clusters
Gallant Unit Citation
Air Force Meritorious Unit Award with oak leaf cluster
Air Force Outstanding Unit Award with Valor device and three oak leaf clusters
Air Force Organizational Excellence Award
Combat Readiness Medal with two oak leaf clusters
Air Force Good Conduct Medal
Air Force Recognition Ribbon
National Defense Service Medal with one bronze service star
Armed Forces Expeditionary Medal with service star
Southwest Asia Service Medal with service star
Global War on Terrorism Expeditionary Medal
Global War on Terrorism Service Medal
Armed Forces Service Medal
Humanitarian Service Medal
Air Force Overseas Long Tour Service Ribbon
Air Force Expeditionary Service Ribbon with gold frame and two oak leaf clusters
Air Force Longevity Service Award with one silver and three bronze oak leaf clusters
Small Arms Expert Marksmanship Ribbon
Air Force Training Ribbon
Medal for Distinguished Service to the Colombian Military Forces
NATO Medal for the former Yugoslavia
Kuwait Liberation Medal (Kuwait)

== Effective dates of promotion ==
Rank	Date
Second Lieutenant	June 1, 1988
First Lieutenant	June 1, 1990
Captain	June 1, 1992
Major	August 1, 1998
Lieutenant Colonel	May 1, 2001
Colonel	August 1, 2005
Brigadier General	July 22, 2011
Major General	May 5, 2014
Lieutenant General	October 22, 2018

Military offices
Preceded by Mark Nowland	Chief of Staff of the United States Southern Command; 2015–2017	Succeeded by Jon A. Norman
Preceded by Eugene Haase	Deputy Commander of the Air Force Special Operations Command; 2017–2018	Succeeded by Vincent Becklund
Preceded by Joseph P. DiSalvo	Military Deputy Commander of the United States Southern Command; 2018–2020	Succeeded by Andrew A. Croft
Preceded by Fritz Roegge	President of the National Defense University; 2021–2024	Succeeded by Peter Garvin
