= USS Philadelphia (SSN-690) =

Los Angeles-class nuclear-powered attack submarine of the US Navy

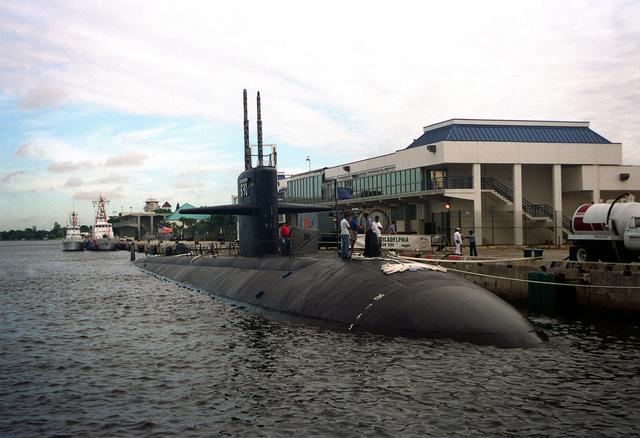
- USS Philadelphia

History

United States
- Name: USS Philadelphia
- Namesake: Philadelphia, Pennsylvania
- Awarded: 8 January 1971
- Builder: General Dynamics Corporation
- Laid down: 12 August 1972
- Launched: 19 October 1974
- Sponsored by: Mrs. Marian Huntington Scott
- Commissioned: 25 June 1977
- Decommissioned: 25 June 2010
- In service: 33 years
- Stricken: 25 June 2010
- Identification: Callsign: NSVS
- Motto: "Philly Delivers"; "Whatever It Takes"; "Finish Strong"
- Nickname(s): Philly
- Honors and awards: Navy Unit Commendation; 6 × Meritorious Unit Commendations; Navy E Ribbon; 4 × Navy Expeditionary Medals; 2 × National Defense Service Medals; Southwest Asia Service Medal
- Status: De-fueled, inactivated
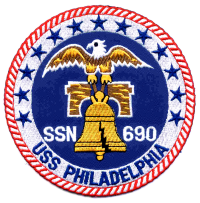
- Badge

General characteristics
- Class & type: Los Angeles-class submarine
- Displacement: 5,705 tons light; 6,075 tons full; 370 tons dead
- Length: 110.3 m (361 ft 11 in)
- Beam: 10 m (32 ft 10 in)
- Draft: 9.7 m (31 ft 10 in)
- Propulsion: S6G nuclear reactor, 2 turbines, 35,000 hp (26 MW), 1 auxiliary motor 325 hp (242 kW), 1 shaft
- Speed: 15 knots (28 km/h) surfaced; 32 knots (59 km/h) submerged
- Test depth: 290 m (950 ft)
- Complement: 12 Officers; 98 Enlisted
- Armament: 4 × 21 in (533 mm) bow tubes; BGM-109 Tomahawk; Mark 48 torpedo

USS Philadelphia (SSN-690), a Los Angeles-class submarine, was the sixth ship of the United States Navy to be named for the city of Philadelphia.

== History ==
The contract to build her was awarded to the Electric Boat Division of General Dynamics Corporation in Groton, Connecticut on 8 January 1971 and her keel was laid down on 12 August 1972. She was launched on 19 October 1974 sponsored by Mrs. Marian Huntington Scott (née Chase), wife of Senate Minority Leader Hugh Scott, and commissioned on 25 June 1977, with Commander Robert B. Osborne USN in command.

In June 1980 Philadelphia departed her homeport of Groton, Connecticut, and headed on a world cruise that would take it to the Indian Ocean/Persian Gulf, as well as the Pacific. Under the command of Commander Edward S. Little USN, the cruise included at visit to Western Australia, when Philadelphia made her only visit to HMAS Stirling in Rockingham, Western Australia, on 23 December 1980. The crew enjoyed Christmas in Australia and some R&R before departing on 29 December 1980. The Philadelphia arrived home in late January 1981.

In 1988, Philadelphia became the first submarine to receive TLAM-D capability.

In 1994, Philadelphia completed the first refueling overhaul of a Los Angeles-class submarine. This was completed at Portsmouth Naval Shipyard in Kittery, Maine.

In 1998, Philadelphia was modified to carry a Dry Deck Shelter, a platform capable of carrying Special Operations Forces. In addition, she was fitted to provide Deep Submergence Rescue Vehicle (DSRV) mother ship support.

On 5 September 2005 Philadelphia was in the Persian Gulf about 30 nautical miles (60 km) northeast of Bahrain when she collided with a Turkish merchant ship, MV Yasa Aysen. No injuries were reported on either vessel. Damage to the submarine was described as "superficial." Philadelphia's Commanding Officer, CDR Steven M. Oxholm, was relieved following the incident. The Turkish ship, which suffered minor damage to her hull just above the water line, was inspected by the United States Coast Guard and found still seaworthy.

In 2006, Philadelphia completed the first-ever Pre-Inactivation Restricted Availability (PIRA) conducted at Portsmouth Naval Shipyard in Kittery, Maine.

On 20 July 2009 the Navy announced that the submarine would be inactivated on 10 June 2010 and subsequently decommissioned. Philadelphia was decommissioned on 25 June 2010, the thirty-third anniversary of her commissioning. Since 1 September 2019 she has been undergoing recycling.

== Deployments ==
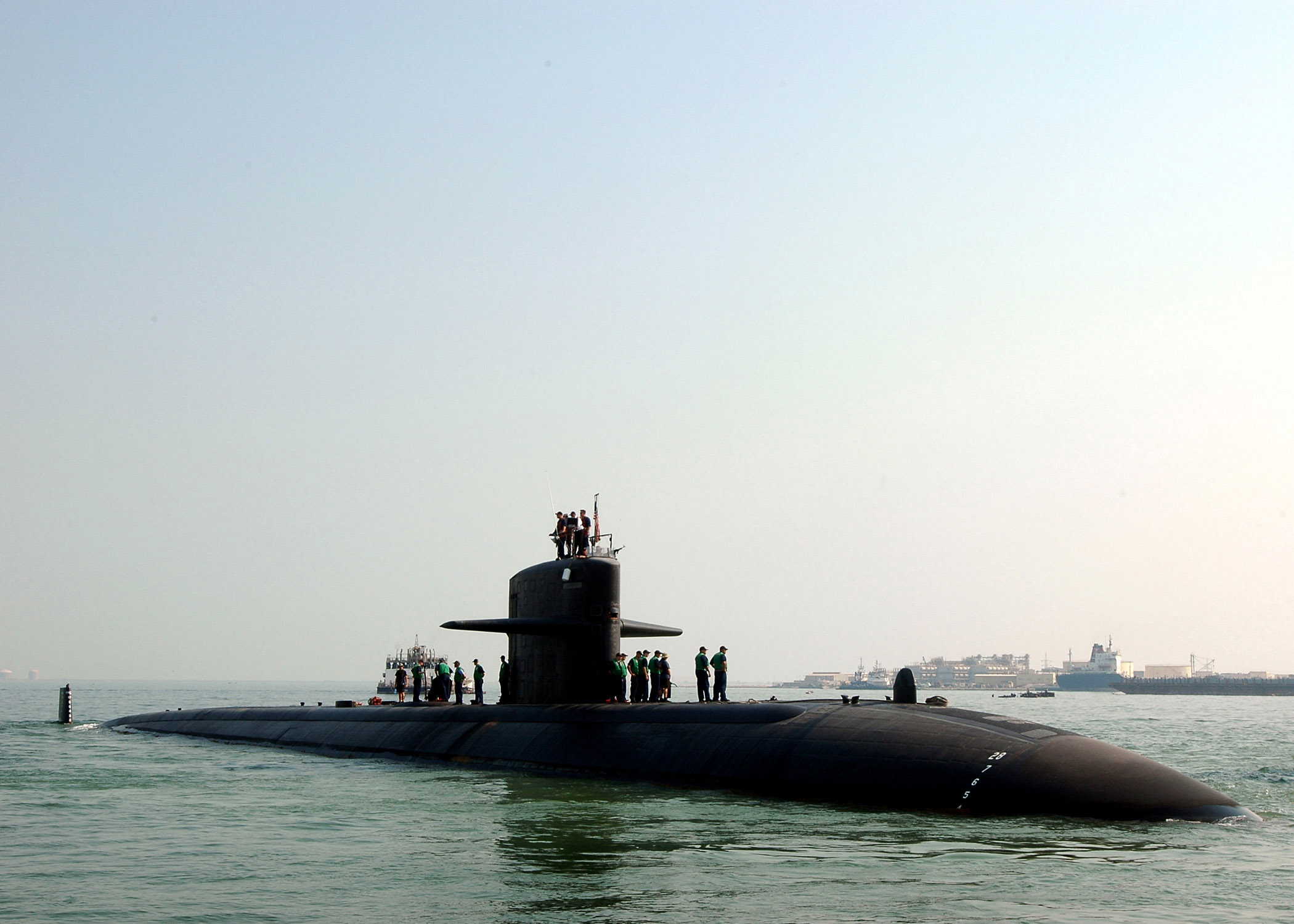
Sailors assigned to USS Philadelphia stand topside as the submarine gets underway

Philadelphia performed many patrols and deployments during her career. She was deployed to the Mediterranean Sea in 1979, 1982, 1986, 1991 (where she later went on to support Operation Desert Storm), 1999, 2001, 2003, 2005, 2007, and 2009, the last three of which also involved operations in support of CENTCOM. She performed a single Western Pacific deployment in 1980. She also spent a fair amount of time in the Atlantic Ocean, including deployments to the Northern part of the Ocean in 1983, 1992, 1996, 1997, and 1999, and one Eastern Atlantic deployment in 1989.

== Awards ==
Over the course of her career, the Philadelphia received many awards. Among the ribbons and medals her crew earned were the Navy Unit Commendation in 1983; the Meritorious Unit Commendation in 1987, 1989, 1991, 1999, 2003 and 2004; the Battle Efficiency "E" Ribbon in 1983, 1990, 1996, 1997, 1998, 2001, 2003, and 2007; The Navy Expeditionary Medal in 2005; and the Southwest Asia Service Medal in 1991.

In terms of other awards given to the ship in terms of excellence from her crew in individual departments, she was awarded the Ney Memorial Award for Outstanding Food Service in 1983, an award for which she was also a finalist in 1996; the "A" Award for Outstanding Anti-Submarine Warfare in 1987, 1988, 1989, and 1991; the Communications Green "C" in 1998, 1999, 2005, and 2007; the Tactical White "T" in 1999 and 2000; the Damage Control Red "DC" in 1999 and 2005; the Deck "D" in 2000' the Engineering Excellence "E" in 2001 and 2006; the Supply Blue "E" in 2001 and 2006; and the Medical Yellow "M" in 2005.

Furthermore, the Philadelphia was awarded the COMSUBLANT Battenberg Cup Nominee for Best All Around Unit in 1996, the CINCLANTFLT Golden Anchor Award in 1990, and the CINCLANTFLT Silver Anchor Award in 1997 and 1998.

Navy Unit Commendation	Meritorious Unit Commendation with six stars	Navy E Ribbon
Navy Expeditionary Medal with four stars	National Defense Service Medal with one star	Southwest Asia Service Medal with one star
Global War on Terrorism Expeditionary Medal	Global War on Terrorism Service Medal	Sea Service Deployment Ribbon with 17 stars
