= Fritz Roegge =

United States Navy vice admiral

Frederick J. Roegge
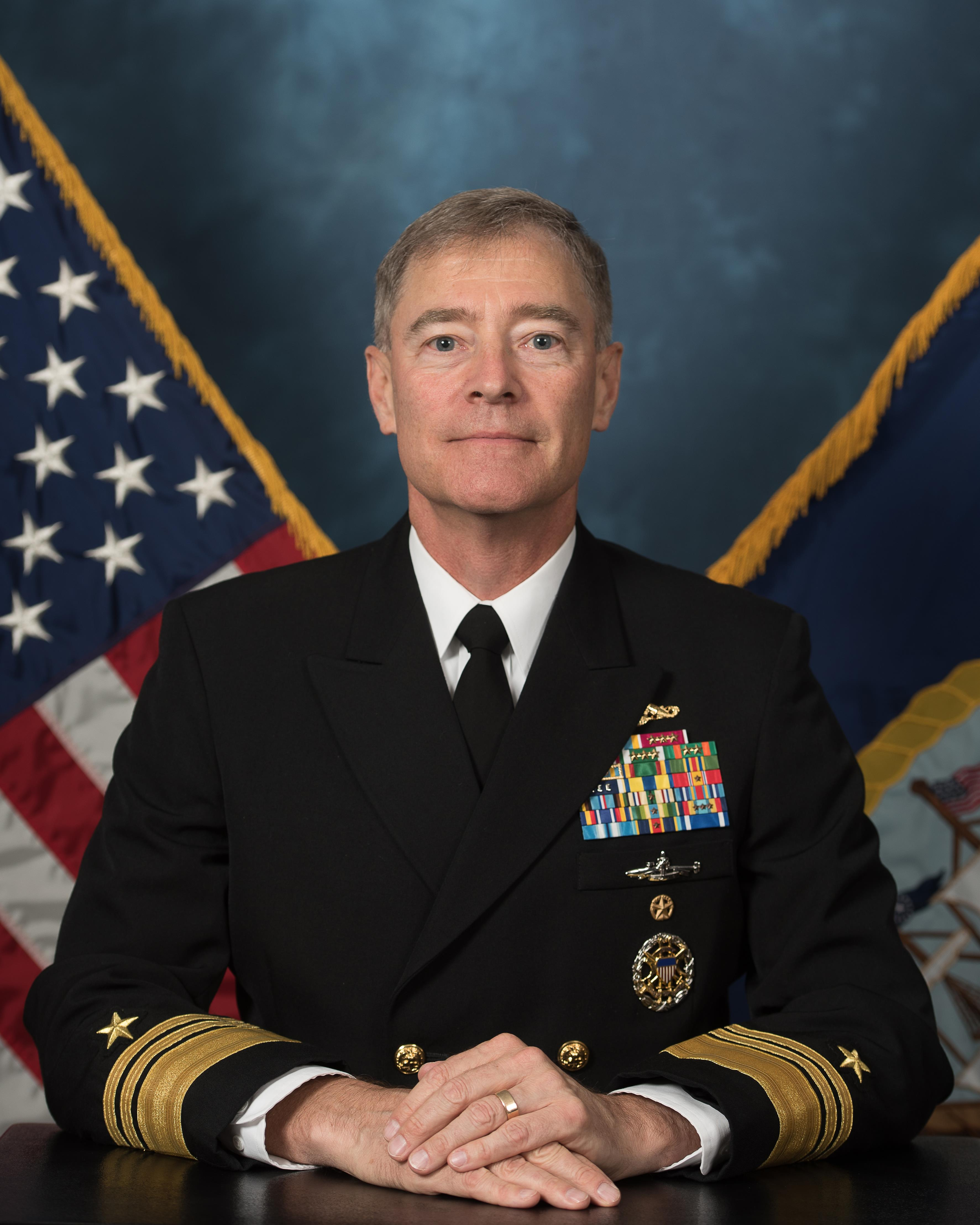
- Born: August 12, 1958 (age 68); Hennepin County, Minnesota, U.S.
- Education: Naval War College (MA); Catholic University of America (MSEM); University of Minnesota (BME)
- Military career
- Allegiance: United States of America
- Branch: United States Navy
- Service years: 1980–2021
- Rank: Vice admiral
- Commands: National Defense University; Submarine Force, U.S. Pacific Fleet; Submarine Group 8 Submarine Squadron 22; USS Connecticut
- Awards: Defense Superior Service Medal; Legion of Merit (4)

Frederick John "Fritz" Roegge (born August 12, 1958) is a retired United States Navy vice admiral who served as the 16th President of the National Defense University from September 25, 2017, to February 3, 2021. He previously served as Commander, Submarine Force, U.S. Pacific Fleet.

== Early life and education ==
Roegge was raised in Edina, Minnesota, graduated from the Institute of Technology at the University of Minnesota with a Bachelor of Mechanical Engineering degree in December 1980 and was commissioned through the NROTC program. He later earned an M.S. degree in engineering management from The Catholic University of America and an M.A. degree in national security and strategic studies from the Naval War College. Roegge was a fellow of the Massachusetts Institute of Technology (MIT) Seminar XXI program.

== Career ==
As a member of the United States Navy, his sea tours included the USS Whale, USS Florida, USS Key West and the USS Connecticut, where he was also the commander. Roegge was the commodore of Submarine Squadron 22 as well as acting commanding officer of the Naval Support Activity La Maddalena in Italy. . In 2012, Roegge took on the position of director of Operations, Intelligence, United States Naval Forces Europe-Africa and Deputy Commander of the U.S. Submarine 6th Fleet from Rear Admiral James G. Foggo. He then served as director of the N13 Military Personnel Plans and Policy Division in the Office of the Chief Naval Operations in Washington D.C. In September 2015, Roegge became the commander of the Pacific Submarine Force, where he oversaw 60% of the United States Navy Submarine force. On 12 September 2017, Roegge was replaced in his position as commander by Rear Admiral Daryl Caudle.

On 25 September 2017, Roegge took on the position as President of the National Defense University in Washington D.C.

After retiring from active duty with more than 30 years of service, Roegge joined Holtec International where he serves as Senior Vice President and Chief Strategy Officer as well as President of Holtec Government Services LLC and Executive Committee Consultant. In February 2026, he joined the Academy Securities’ Advisory Board and Geopolitical Intelligence Group.

== Awards ==
On 11 September 2017, Roegge was awarded the Legion of Merit during a change of command ceremony on the USS Jacksonville in Joint Base Pearl Harbor-Hickam.

== Personal ==
Roegge is the son of John Alex Roegge and Marilyn May (Panning) Roegge. His parents were married on September 15, 1957, in Carver County, Minnesota.

Roegge married Julie Anne Labeau on April 28, 1984, in Hennepin County, Minnesota.

Military offices
Preceded by Phillip G. Sawyer	Commander, Submarine Force, U.S. Pacific Fleet; 2015–2017	Succeeded by Daryl L. Caudle
Preceded by Frederick M. Padilla	President of the National Defense University; 2017–2021	Succeeded by Michael T. Plehn
