= Thomas Withers =

United States Navy officer (1886–1953)

Thomas Withers, Jr.
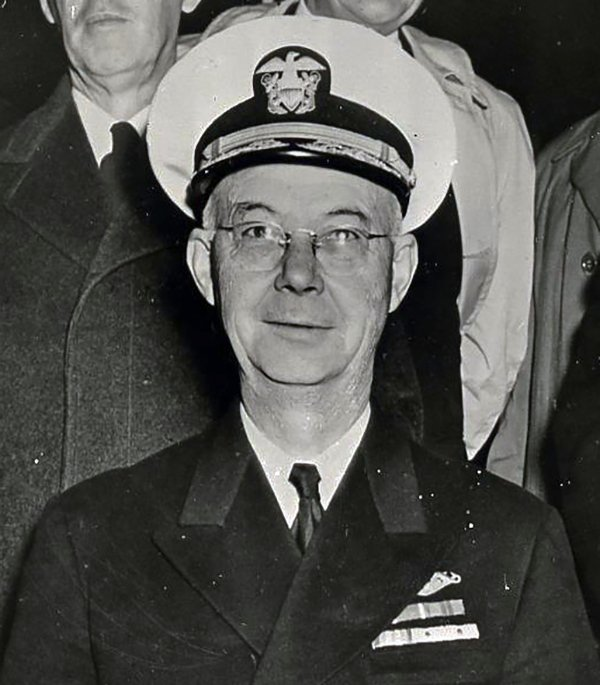
- Born: May 28, 1886; South Platte, Colorado, U.S.
- Died: June 25, 1953 (aged 67) Coronado, California, U.S.
- Buried: Arlington National Cemetery
- Allegiance: United States
- Branch: United States Navy
- Service years: 1906–1946
- Rank: Rear Admiral
- Commands: USS E-1 (SS-24); Submarine Division 4 Submarine Division 95; USS California (BB-44); COMSUBPAC; Portsmouth Naval Shipyard
- Conflicts: World War I World War II
- Education: United States Naval Academy
- Spouse: Helen Fuller
- Children: Helen Withers Stoner

Thomas Withers Jr. (28 May 1886 – 25 June 1953) was a United States Navy rear admiral, early submarine pioneer, and Commander, Submarine Force, United States Pacific Fleet (COMSUBPAC) at the outbreak of World War II. Naval historians regard him as one of the key architects of the long-range fleet-submarine concept adopted by the United States in the 1930s. He also directed an aggressive pre-war training program that helped give the Pacific submarine force its wartime edge. His reputation is tempered by his firm, later proven mistaken, defense of the Mark 14 torpedo’s magnetic detonator in 1941-42.

== Early life and education ==
Withers was born in South Platte, Colorado. He entered the United States Naval Academy in 1902 and graduated with the class of 1906.

== Naval career ==
=== Early sea duty ===
Withers served in battleship USS Alabama, cruiser USS California and storeship USS Glacier. Promoted lieutenant in 1911, he received his first command, the submarine USS E-1, on 14 April 1914. In May 1915 he led E-1 on a nonstop 1,230-nautical-mile passage from Key West to New York for President Woodrow Wilson’s Naval Review, the longest continuous cruise by a U.S. submarine to that time.

=== Inter-war influence ===
- Withers Memorandum (3 February 1928) – as commander of Submarine Division 4 he told the General Board that 2,000-ton “fleet submarines” sacrificed agility and habitability, urging medium-displacement boats for independent patrols.
- Naval War College paper “Design of Submarines” (14 August 1930) set out a 1,100- to 1,400-ton, 90-day, 21-knot boat that became the basis for the Salmon- and Gato-class designs.
- Commandant, Submarine Base New London (1934-1937) – newspapers showed Withers welcoming President Franklin D. Roosevelt to the 1934 Harvard-Yale regatta and guiding tactical development.

He was promoted to temporary rear admiral on 1 June 1939; the rank became permanent on 1 December 1940.

=== World War II ===
==== Commander, Submarines Pacific (January 1941 – May 1942) ====
Withers assumed COMSUBPAC eleven months before the attack on Pearl Harbor. To prepare the force he

- suspended peacetime torpedo competitions and ordered live-fire exercises;
- introduced mandatory deep-dive and aircraft-evasion drills; and
- requisitioned the closed Royal Hawaiian Hotel as a ten-day recuperation centre for submarine crews, an R and R model later copied fleet-wide.

===== Torpedo-detonator controversy =====
Boat captains quickly reported duds and premature explosions from the Mark 14’s magnetic detonator. Withers, a long-time supporter, initially blamed crew error. Bureau of Ordnance tests in 1943 confirmed a high failure rate, and historians now cite Withers’ stance as an example of pre-war confirmation bias.

==== Portsmouth Naval Shipyard (1942 – 1945) ====
Relieved by Rear Admiral Robert H. English in May 1942, Withers became commandant of Portsmouth Naval Shipyard, Kittery, Maine, supervising construction of 78 fleet submarines including USS Apogon (SS-308) and USS Torsk (SS-423). He presented combat awards, notably the Navy Cross to Commander Lawson “Red” Ramage on 22 November 1943.

=== Retirement and death ===
Withers retired on 1 June 1946, settled in Coronado, California, and died there on 25 June 1953. He is buried at Arlington National Cemetery.
