= List of U.S. Navy acronyms =

The United States Navy, like any organization, produces its own acronyms and abbreviations, which often come to have meaning beyond their bare expansions. United States Navy personnel sometimes colloquially refer to these as NAVSpeak. Like other organizational colloquialisms, their use often creates or reinforces a sense of esprit and closeness within the organization.

== Official acronyms ==
For a comprehensive list of unit organizations in the United States Navy, see List of units of the United States Navy.

=== # ===
- 1MC – 1 Main Circuit, shipboard public address system
- 2MC – 2 Main Circuit, same as 1MC, but limited to the engine room
- 3M – Maintenance and Material Management (3M System)
- 3MA – Maintenance and Material Management Assistant
- 3MC – Maintenance and Material Management Coordinator
- 3MI – Maintenance and Material Management Inspection
- 5MC – 5 Main Circuit, Carrier Flight Deck address system
- 27MC – Battle Stations Main Circuit: Control Room, Sonar Room, Radio Room, and Fire Control address system

=== A ===
- A-STRIKE – Assistant STRIKE Operations Officer (Carrier Scheduler/Planner)
- AA – Airman Apprentice (E-2)
- AAW – Anti-Air Warfare
- AB – Aviation Boatswain's Mate
- ABE – Aviation Boatswain's Mate – Equipment (Launch and Recovery Systems)
- ABF – Aviation Boatswain's Mate (Fuels)
- ABFD – Advanced Base Floating Dry Dock, class/type of ship
- ABH – Aviation Boatswain's Mate (Aircraft Handling)
- AC – Air Traffic Controlman
- ACR – Armored cruiser, class/type of ship
- AD – Auxiliary, Destroyer Tender, class/type of ship
- AD – Aviation Machinist's Mate
- ADCON – Administrative control
- ADNS – Automated Digital Network System
- ADSW – Active Duty Special Work (U.S. Navy Reserve, type of active duty orders, typically 6 months in duration)
- ADT – Active Duty Training (U.S. Navy Reserve, type of active duty orders, typically more than 30 days but less than 6 months)
- AE – Auxiliary, Explosives, class/type of ship. An ammunition ship.
- AE – Aviation Electrician's Mate
- AF – Aviation Photographer's Mate
- AFC – Aviation Fire Control
- AFCM – Master Chief Aircraft Maintenanceman
- AFFF – Aqueous Film Forming Foam
- AFS – Auxiliary, Fast Stores, class/type of ship. A supply ship that carries a little bit of everything, nicknamed "7-11"
- AFSB – Afloat Forward Staging Base
- AG – Aerographer's Mate
- AIMD – Aircraft Intermediate Maintenance Department (or Detachment)
- AK – Auxiliary, Cargo, class/type of ship. An attack transport.
- AK – Aviation Storekeeper (outdated; merged into LS rating)
- ALNAV – All Navy
- ALPO – Assistant Lead Petty Officer
- AM – Aviation Structural Mechanic
- AME – Aviation Structural Mechanic – Environmental (Air Conditioning, Oxygen, and Ejection Seats), Aviation Mechanical Exception
- AMH – Aviation Structural Mechanic – Hydraulics
- AMMRL – Aviation Maintenance Material Readiness List
- AMO – Assistant Maintenance Officer
- AMS – Aviation Structural Mechanic – Structures
- AN – Airman
- AO – Auxiliary, Fleet Oil, class/type of ship; Aviation Ordnanceman
- AOE – Auxiliary, Oil, Explosives, class/type of ship.
- AOR – Auxiliary, Oil, Replenishment, class/type of ship
- AOW – Auxiliaryman of the Watch
- API – Aviation Preflight Indoctrination
- AR – Auxiliary, Repair, class/type of ship. A repair ship
- AR – Airman Recruit (E-1)
- ARRS – Afloat Readiness Reporting System
- ARS – Auxiliary, Repair and Salvage, class/type of ship
- AS – Auxiliary, Submarine Tender, class/type of ship
- AS – Aviation Support Equipment Technician
- ASAU – Air Search and Attack Unit
- ASR – Auxiliary, Submarine Rescue, class/type of ship
- ASUW – Anti-Surface Warfare
- ASVAB – Armed Services Vocational Aptitude Battery
- ASW – Auxiliary Seawater system
- ASW – Anti-Submarine Warfare
- ASWO – Anti-Submarine Warfare Officer
- AT – Annual Training (U.S. Navy Reserve, type of active duty orders, typically less than 30 days)
- AT – Aviation Electronics Technician
- ATS – Auxiliary, Towing and Salvage, class/type of ship
- AUTEC – Atlantic Undersea Test and Evaluation Center
- AUXO – Auxiliaries Officer
- AVCM – Master Chief Avionics Technician
- AVGAS – Aviation Gasoline
- AWCS – Assistant Work Center Supervisor
- AZ – Aviation Maintenance Administrationman

=== B ===
- B/N – Bombardier/Navigator; NFO in A-3B Skywarrior, A-5A Vigilante and A-6 Intruder attack aircraft (no longer used)
- BAM – Bad Ass Marine ("Broad Ass Marine" if used in reference to a female)
- BB – Battleship
- BCD – Bad Conduct Discharge (also colloquially known as "Big Chicken Dinner")
- BCGs – Birth Control Glasses
- BCM – Beyond Capable Maintenance. Equipment status that indicates the item cannot be repaired and must be sent out for rework or disposed.
- BEQ – Bachelor Enlisted Quarters
- BESS – Basic Enlisted Submarine School
- BJOQ – Blue Jacket of the Quarter
- BJOY – Blue Jacket of the Year
- BLUF – Bottom Line Up Front
- BM – Boatswain's Mate
- BMOW – Boatswain's Mate of the Watch
- BOHICA – Bend Over Here It Comes Again
- BOL – BUPERS Online
- BT – Boiler Technician
- BU – Builder
- BUDS – Basic Underwater Demolition School
- BUMED – Bureau of Medicine and Surgery
- BUPERS – Bureau of Naval Personnel
- BUSANDA – Bureau of Supplies and Accounts
- BUWEPS – Bureau of Naval Weapons
- BZ – Bravo Zulu (meaning well done)

=== C ===
- CA – Construction Apprentice
- CA – Cruiser, Armoured, class/type of ship. Heavy Cruiser (outdated)
- CAG – Cruiser, Attack, Guided Missile, class/type of ship. Guided Missile Heavy Cruiser (outdated)
- CAG – Commander, Air Group
- CAPT – Captain
- CBMU – Construction Battalion Maintenance Unit
- CASCAN – CASREP Cancellation or Cancellation of Casualty Report
- CASCOR – CASREP Correction or Correction of the Casualty in the Casualty Report
- CASREP – Casualty Report
- CC – Cruiser, class/type of ship
- CCC – Comprehensive Communications Check
- CDB – Career Development Board
- CDC – Combat Direction Center (CIC on carriers)
- CDO – Command Duty Officer
- CDR – Commander
- CE – Construction Electrician
- CEC – Civil Engineer Corps
- CEC – Cooperative Engagement Capability
- CED – Current Enlistment Date
- CENTCOM – U.S. Central Command (USCENTCOM)
- CF – Charlie Foxtrot (polite form of "Cluster Fuck")
- CG – Cruiser, Guided Missile, class/type of ship
- CGN – Cruiser, Guided Missile, Nuclear, class/type of ship (outdated)
- CHC – Chief of Chaplains of the United States Navy
- CHENG – Chief Engineer (surface only)
- CHMC – Chaplain of the United States Marine Corps (always a Navy flag officer)
- CIC – Combat Information Center
- CICO – Combat Information Center Officer
- CIS – CASREP Information System
- CIVLANT – "Civilian Life" as defined by Atlantic Fleet personnel
- CIVPAC – "Civilian Life" as defined by Pacific Fleet personnel
- CIWS – Close-In Weapon System
- CM – Construction Mechanic
- CMC – Commandant of the Marine Corps or Chaplain of the Marine Corps or Command Master Chief
- CMDCM – Command Master Chief
- CMDCS – Command Senior Chief
- CMS-ID – Career Management System-Interactive Detailing
- CN – Constructionman
- CNATRA – Chief of Naval Air Training
- CNAVRES – Chief of Navy Reserve
- CNET – Command Naval Education and Training
- CNIC – Commander, Navy Installations Command
- CNO – Chief of Naval Operations
- CO – Commanding officer (Note: Not confined to USN use.)
- COB – Chief of the Boat (traditionally found only on submarines; pronounced "cob"). Can also be used for "close of business" (pronounced "C-O-B").
- COD – Carrier Onboard Delivery
- COMCVW – Commander, Carrier Air Wing
- COMDESGRU – Commander, Destroyer Group
- COMDESRON – Commander, Destroyer Squadron
- COMEX – Commence Exercise
- COMLANTFLT – Commander, U.S. Atlantic Fleet
- COMMO – Communications Officer
- COMNAVAIRES – Commander, Naval Air Force, Reserve
- COMNAVAIRFOR (also CNAF) – Commander, Naval Air Forces
- COMNAVAIRLANT (also CNAL) – Commander, Naval Air Force Atlantic
- COMNAVAIRPAC – Commander, Naval Air Force Pacific
- COMNAVRESFOR – Commander, Navy Reserve Forces
- COMNAVSEASYSCOM – Commander, Naval Sea Systems Command
- COMNAVSECGRU – Commander, Naval Security Group
- COMPACFLT – Commander, Pacific Fleet (formerly CINCPACFLT)
- COMPATRECONGRU – Commander, Patrol and Reconnaissance Group
- COMPATRECONWING – Commander, Patrol and Reconnaissance Wing
- COMPTUEX – Composite Training Unit Exercise
- COMSEC – Communications Security
- COMSUBFOR – Commander, Submarine Forces
- COMSUBLANT – Commander, Submarine Force Atlantic
- COMSUBPAC – Commander, Submarine Force, U.S. Pacific Fleet
- COMTACGRU – Commander, Tactical Air Control Group
- COMTRAWING – Commander, Training Air Wing
- CORTRAMID – Career Orientation and Training for Midshipmen
- COS (also CoS) – Flag Officer's Chief of Staff
- CPO – Chief Petty Officer
- CPOM – Chief Petty Officer's Mess
- CR – Construction Recruit
- CRG – Coastal Riverine Group
- CS – Culinary Specialist
- CSADD – Coalition of Sailors Against Destructive Decisions
- CSC – Combat Systems Coordinator
- CSC – Command Senior Chief
- CSC – Culinary Specialist Chief (E-7)
- CSEC – Computerized Self Evaluation Checklist
- CSMC – Combat Systems Maintenance Center
- CSOOW – Combat Systems Officer of the Watch
- CSOSS – Combat Systems Operational Sequencing Systems
- CT – Cryptologic Technician
- CTA – Cryptologic Technician, Administrative (now-defunct, merged with yeoman)
- CTI – Cryptologic Technician, Interpretive
- CTM – Cryptologic Technician, Maintenance
- CTN – Cryptologic Technician, Networks
- CTO – Cryptologic Technician, Communications
- CTR – Cryptologic Technician, Collection
- CTT – Cryptologic Technician, Technical
- CV – Aircraft Carrier, class/type of ship
- CVA – Aircraft Carrier, Attack, class/type of ship
- CVAN – Aircraft Carrier, Attack, Nuclear, class/type of ship
- CVN – Aircraft Carrier, Nuclear, class/type of ship
- CVW – Carrier Air Wing
- CWO – Chief Warrant Officer

=== D ===
• D1-R – 3M periodicity code or a shower (slang for daily, once, or as required)

- DAPA – Drug and Alcohol Programs Advisor
- DC – Damage Controlman
- DC – Dental Corps
- DCA – Damage Control Assistant
- DCAG – Deputy Air Wing Commander (see CAG)
- DCC – Damage Control Central
- DCO – Damage Control Officer (Chief Engineer) or Direct Commission Officer
- DCPO – Damage Control Petty Officer
- DD – Destroyer
- DDG – Guided Missile Destroyer
- DDR – Radar Picket Destroyer
- DE – Destroyer Escort
- DESDIV – Destroyer Division
- DESRON – Destroyer Squadron
- DEVGRU – Naval Special Warfare Development Group, formerly (and informally still) SEAL Team SIX
- DFM – Diesel Fuel Marine (F-76), standard Navy bunker fuel
- DILLIGAF – Does It Look Like I Give A Flip(uck), standard Navy slang
- DIRNSA – Director of the National Security Agency
- DL – Destroyer Leader (outdated)
- DLG – Guided Missile Destroyer Leader (outdated)
- DLGN – Nuclear-powered Guided Missile Destroyer Leader (outdated)
- DM – Destroyer Minelayer (outdated)
- DM – Illustrator Draftsman
- DMHRSi – Defense Medical Human Resources System – internet
- DOD (also DoD) – Department of Defense
- DoN – Department of the Navy
- DRB – Discipline Review Board
- DRRS-N – Defense Readiness Reporting System – Navy
- DS – Data Systems Technician
- DSG – Defense Strategic Guidance
- DVS – Department of Veterans Services, usually administered by each state

=== E ===
- EAOS – End of Active Obligated Service
- EAWS – Enlisted Aviation Warfare Specialist
- ECRC – Expeditionary Combat Readiness Center
- EDMC – Engineering Department Master Chief (Submarines)
- EDO – Engineering Duty Officer
- EEBD – Emergency Escape Breathing Device
- EIDWS – Enlisted Information Dominance Warfare Specialist
- EISM-Electronic Information Security Manager
- ELECTRO - Electrical Officer
- EM – Electrician's Mate
- EM – Emergency Management
- EMCON – Emissions Control
- EMI – Extra Military Instruction
- EMN – Electrician's Mate, Nuclear Field
- EMO – Electronics Material Officer
- EN – Engineman
- ENS – Ensign
- EO – Equipment Operator
- EOD – Explosive Ordnance Disposal
- EOOW – Engineering Officer of the Watch
- EOS – Enclosed Operating Space
- EOSS – Engineering Operational Sequencing Systems
- ERS – Engineroom Supervisor
- ESWS – Enlisted Surface Warfare Specialist
- ET – Electronics Technician
- ETN – Electronics Technician, Nuclear Field
- EW – Electronic Warfare
- EWO – Electronic Warfare Officer
- EWS – Engineering Watch Supervisor
- EXW – Expeditionary Warfare

=== F ===
- F/MC – Fleet (or Force) Master Chief
- FA – Fireman Apprentice
- FAC – Forward Air Controller
- FAC – Fast attack craft
- FAC/A – Forward Air Controller/Airborne
- FBM – Fleet Ballistic Missile
- FC – Fire Controlman
- FCDSSA - Fleet Combat Direction Systems Support Activity
- FCF – Functional Check Flight
- FCPCP – Fleet Computer Programming Center of the Pacific
- FCPOM – First Class Petty Officer's Mess
- FDO – Flight Deck Officer
- FF – Frigate, class/type of ship
- FFG – Frigate, Guided Missile, class/type of ship
- FIAC – Fast Inshore Attack Craft
- FICEURLANT – Fleet Intelligence Center Europe & Atlantic
- FIGMO – F(uck) IT, Got My Orders
- FIS – Fire Inhibit Switch
- FLEACT – Fleet Activity
- FLTMPS – Fleet Training Management and Planning System
- FMF – Fleet Marine Force
- FMSS – Field Medical Service School
- FN – Fireman
- FNAEB – Field Naval Aviator Evaluation Board
- FNMOC – Fleet Numerical Meteorology and Oceanography Center
- FOD – Foreign Object Damage (Debris and Detection also used in some cases)
- FPCON – Force Protection Condition
- FR – Fireman Recruit
- FRC – Fleet Readiness Center
- FRS – Fleet Replacement Squadron (Formerly RAG)
- FSA – Food Service Attendant
- FSO – Food Service Officer
- FT – Fire control technician
- FTB – Fire Control Technician Ballistic Missile
- FTM – Fire Control Technician Missiles
- FTN – Forget the Navy (polite form)
- FTN – Full-time Navy (humorous form)
- FTS – Full-time Support (full-time, active-duty personnel in U.S. Navy Reserve)
- FWD - Forward

=== G ===
- GCCS-M – Global Command and Control System-Maritime
- GM – Gunner's Mate
- GMG – Gunner's Mate Guns
- GMM – Gunner's Mate Missiles
- GMT – Gunner's Mate Technician
- GQ – General Quarters (Call to battle stations)
- GS – Guided Missileman
- GSA – General Services Administration
- GSE- Gas Turbine Systems Technician – Electrical
- GSM- Gas Turbine Systems Technician – Mechanic

=== H ===
- HA – Hospital Apprentice
- HAC – Helicopter Aircraft Commander
- HEDSUPPACTLANT – Headquarters, Support Activity Atlantic
- HELO – Helicopter
- HM – Hospital Corpsman
- HMFIC – Head Mother Fucker In Charge (See SOPA Below)
- HN – Hospitalman
- HR – Hospital Recruit
- HS – Helicopter Squadron, Anti-Submarine Warfare (HS-4 Black Knights)
- HT – Hull Maintenance Technician

=== I ===
- IAMM – Individual Augmentation Manpower Management
- IAP – In Assignment Processing
- IAW – In Accordance With
- IC – Interior Communications Electrician
- ICO – In Case Of (or In Care Of / In Concern Of)
- IFS – Introductory Flight Screening
- IHO – Industrial Hygiene Officer
- IMF – Intermediate Maintenance Facility
- IMRL – Individual Material Readiness List
- INCOM– Incoming
- IOIC - Integrated Operational Intelligence Center
- IP – Irish Pennant – A loose thread of a Naval or Marine uniform.
- IRT – In Reference To
- IT – Information System Technician
- ITS – Information Technology Submarines

=== J ===
- JAG – Judge Advocate General's Corps, U.S. Navy
- JBD – Jet Blast Deflector (on board carriers)
- JHSV – Joint High Speed Vessel
- JO – Journalist (obsolete), Junior Officer
- JOPA – Junior Officer Protection Association
- JP-5 – Jet Propellant no. 5, standard Navy jet fuel (F-44, AVCAT)
- JTF – Joint Task Force
- JTFEX – Joint Task Force Exercise

=== K ===
- KISS – Keep It Simple, Stupid

=== L ===
- LANTCOM – Atlantic Command
- LAWS – Laser Weapon System
- LCAC – Landing Craft, Air Cushion.
- LCC – Amphibious Command Ship.
- LCDR – Lieutenant Commander
- LCPO – Leading Chief Petty Officer
- LCM – Landing Craft, Mechanized, class/type of boat. Usage: LCM-4, LCM-6, LCM-8
- LCPL – Landing Craft, Personnel Launch, class/type of boat.
- LCS – Littoral Combat Ship, class/type of ship.
- LCVP – Landing Craft, Vehicle, Personnel, class/type of boat.
- LDO – Limited Duty Officer
- LES – Leave and Earnings Statement
- LHA – Landing, Helicopter, Assault, class/type of ship.
- LHD – Landing, Helicopter, Dock, class/type of ship.
- LKA – Landing, Cargo, Attack, class/type of ship.
- LOSCA - Lube Oil Service Conditioning Assembly
- LOCA - Loss Of Coolant Accident
- LPD – Landing, Personnel, Dock, class/type of ship.
- LPA – Landing, Personnel, Attack, class/type of ship.
- LPH – Landing, Personnel, Helicopter, class/type of ship.
- LPO – Leading Petty Officer
- LPOD – Last Plane On Deck
- LRAD – Long Range Acoustic Device
- LS – Logistics Specialist
- LSD – Landing Ship, Dock, class/type of ship.
- LSO – Landing Signal Officer
- LST – Landing Ship, Tank, class/type of ship.
- LT – Lieutenant
- LTJG – Lieutenant Junior Grade

=== M ===
- MAA (also meMA) – Master-at-Arms
- MALS – Marine Aviation Logistics Squadron
- MC – Mass Communication Specialist
- MCO – Material Control Officer
- MCPO – Master Chief Petty Officer
- MCPON – Master Chief Petty Officer of the Navy (pronounced "Mick Pon")
- MIDN – Midshipman
- MIDRATS – Midnight Rations
- MLCPO – Machinery Division Leading Chief Petty Officer (Submarine)
- MM – Machinist's Mate
- MMCO – Maintenance/Material Control Officer
- MMCPO – Maintenance Master Chief Petty Officer
- MMN – Machinist's Mate, Nuclear Field
- MNP – MyNavy Portal, which replaced Navy Knowledge Online (NKO)
- MO – Maintenance Officer (pronounced "Moe")
- MOA – Memorandum of Agreement
- MOU – Memorandum of Understanding
- MPA – Main Propulsion Assistant
- MPA – Military Patrol Craft (P-3 Orion, etc.)
- MR – Machinery Repairman
- MRDB – Material Readiness Database
- MRG - Main Reduction Gear
- MSG – Message
- MSW – Main Seawater System
- MT – Missile Technician
- MTS – Master Training Specialist
- MU – Musician

=== N ===
- NAB – Naval Amphibious Base
- NAF – Naval Air Facility
- NALCOMIS – Naval Aviation Logistics Command Management Information System
- NAMI – Naval Aerospace Medicine Institute
- NAS – Naval Air Station
- NAS JRB – Naval Air Station / Joint Reserve Base
- NATOPS – Naval Air Training and Operational Procedure Standardization
- NAVAIR – Naval Air Systems Command
- NAVCOMP – Comptroller of the Navy
- NAVEDTRA – Chief of Navy Education and Training
- NAVFAC – Naval Facilities Engineering Command
- NAVFLIGHTDEMRON – Navy Flight Demonstration Squadron (Blue Angels)
- NAVMAT – Naval Material Command
- NAVMILPERSCOM – Navy Military Personnel Command
- NAVSEA – Naval Sea Systems Command
- NAVSECGRUACT – Naval Security Group Activity
- NAVSTA – Naval Station
- NAVSUBASE – Naval Submarine Base
- NAVSUP – Naval Supply Systems Command
- NAVTRA – Chief of Naval Training
- NAWCAD – Naval Air Warfare Center, Aircraft Division
- NAWCWD – Naval Air Warfare Center, Weapons Division (formerly Pacific Missile Test Center)
- NBSD – Naval Base San Diego
- NC – Navy Counselor
- NCDU – Navy Combat Demolition Unit
- NCF – Naval Construction Force (Seabees)
- NCIS – Naval Criminal Investigative Service
- NCM – Navy Commendation Medal
- NCTAMS – Naval Computer and Telecommunications Area Master Station
- NCTS – Naval Computer Telecommunications Station
- NECC – Navy Expeditionary Combat Command
- NeL – Navy eLearning
- NEX – Navy Exchange
- NFAAS – Navy Family Accountability and Assessment System
- NFO – Naval Flight Officer
- NFO – Normal Fuel Oil
- NIWC – Naval Information Warfare Center (pronounced "nie-wik")
- NJROTC – Navy Junior Reserve Officers' Training Corps
- NKO – Navy Knowledge Online, replaced by MyNavy Portal (MNP)
- NMCB – Naval Mobile Construction Battalion Seabees
- NMCI – Navy/Marine Corps Intranet
- NMPS – Navy Mobilization and Processing Site
- NMTI – Navy Military Training Instructor
- NNPTU – Naval Nuclear Power Training Unit
- NNSY – Norfolk Naval Shipyard
- NOSC – Navy Operational Support Center (a U.S. Navy Reserve shore command)
- NOSR – Network On-Site Representative
- NPC – Navy Personnel Command
- NROTC – Navy Reserve Officer Training Corps
- NS – Naval Station
- NSAWC – Naval Strike and Air Warfare Center
- NSFO – Navy Special Fuel Oil
- NSGA – Naval Security Group Activity
- NSIPS – Navy Standard Integrated Personnel System
- NSWC – Naval Surface Warfare Center
- NSWG – Naval Special Warfare Group
- NSY – Naval Shipyard
- NTC – Naval Training Center
- NUWC – Naval Undersea Warfare Center
- NWTD – Non Watertight Door
- NWU – Navy Working Uniform

=== O ===
- OAE – Old Antarctic Explorer
- OBA – Oxygen Breathing Apparatus
- OBE - Overcome By Events
- OCS – Officer Candidate School, located at Naval Station Newport
- OFS – Out Freaking Standing (polite form)
- OIC – Officer in Charge
- OM – On the Move
- OMMS-NG - Organizational Maintenance Management System - Next Generation
- OMPF – Official Military Personnel File
- ONR – Office of Naval Research
- OOC – Out of Calibration or Out of Compliance
- OOD – Officer of the Deck
- OOMA – Optimized Organizational Maintenance Activity
- OPCON – Operational control
- OPNAV – Office of the Chief of Naval Operations
- OPS-O – Operations Officer
- OPSEC – Operations security
- OSA – Overseas Contingency Operation Support Assignments
- OTSR – Optimal Track Ship Routing

=== P ===
- PACOM – Pacific Command
- PAPERCLIP – People Against People Ever Reenlisting Civilian Life Is Preferred
- PAX – Passengers
- PCO – Prospective commanding officer
- PCS – Permanent Change of Station
- PDHA – Post-Deployment Health Assessment
- PDHRA – Post-Deployment Health Re-Assessment
- PFA – Physical Fitness Assessment
- PHA – Physical Health Assessment
- PHRA – Physical Health Re-Assessment
- PLD – Permanent Limited Duty
- PIR – Pass in Review
- PMS – Planned Maintenance System
- PO(3/2/1) – Petty Officer (Third/Second/First Class)
- POC – Point of Contact
- POD – Plan of the Day
- POM – Plan of the Month
- POM - Prior to Overseas Movement
- POOW – Petty Officer of the Watch
- POTUS – President of the United States
- POW – Plan of the Week
- POW – Prisoner of War
- PRD – Projected Rotation Date
- PRIFLY – Primary Flight Control (carriers)
- PRT – Physical Readiness Test
- PSNS and IMF – Puget Sound Naval Shipyard and Intermediate Maintenance Facility
- PT – Physical Training
- PTS – Perform to Serve
- PWD – Public Works Department
- PXO – Prospective Executive Officer

=== Q ===
- QAWTD/QAWTH – Quick Acting Water Tight Door/Quick Acting Water Tight Hatch
- QM – Quartermaster
- QMOW – Quartermaster of the Watch

=== R ===
- RADCON – Radiation Control
- RADM – Rear Admiral (United States) (Upper Half)
- RADM – Relational Administrative Data Management
- RAG – Replacement Air Group, now known as Fleet Replacement Squadron (FRS)
- RCA – Reactor Controls Assistant
- RDBM – Red Data-Base Manager
- RDC – Recruit Division Commander
- RDML – Rear Admiral (United States) (Lower Half)
- REPO – Repair Division Officer
- RHIB (RIB) – Rigid Hull Inflatable Boat
- RIMPAC – Rim of the Pacific
- RIO – Radar Intercept Officer (NFO in F-4 Phantom II and F-14 Tomcat)
- RL – Restricted Line Officer
- RM – Radioman
- RMD – Restricted Maneuvering Doctrine
- ROC – Readiness Operations Center
- ROC/POE - Required Operational Capabilities / Projected Operating Environment
- RPM – Remedial Project Manager
- RP – Religious Program Specialist
- RPOC – Recruit Petty Officer in Charge or Recruit Chief Petty Officer
- ROM – Restriction of movement (14 day quarantine during COVID-19)
- RT – Radiotelephone (voice radio)
- RTC – Recruit Training Command
- RTD – Return to Duty

=== S ===
- S2F – Speed to Fleet
- SA – Seaman Apprentice
- SAG – Surface Action Group
- SAM – Surface-to-Air Missile
- SAPR – Sexual Assault Prevention and Response
- SAR - Search And Rescue
- SARC – Special Amphibious Reconnaissance Corpsman
- SAU – Search and Attack Unit
- SCAT – Small Craft Attack Team
- SCBA – Self-Contained Breathing Apparatus
- SCPO – Senior Chief Petty Officer
- SCRAM – Safety Control Rod Axe Man. Reactor emergency shutdown
- SCW – Seabee Combat Warfare Specialist insignia
- SE – Support Equipment
- SES – Surface Effect Ship, class/type of ship
- SEL – Senior Enlisted Leader (also seen as SEA – Senior Enlisted Advisor)
- SEALs – United States Navy SEALs (stands for Sea, Air, Land), officially termed Special Warfare Operators (SO)
- SEAOPDET – Sea Operational Detachment
- SECDEF – Secretary of Defense (United States)
- SECNAV – Secretary of the Navy (United States)
- SFC - Static Frequency Converter
- SICLOS – Shift Inspect Clean Lube Oil Strainers
- Sitrep – Situation report
- SLBM – Submarine-Launched Ballistic Missile
- SN – Seaman
- SNA – Student Naval Aviator
- SO – Special Warfare Operator, aka US Navy SEAL.
- SOFA – Status of Forces Agreement
- SONAR – Sound Navigation And Ranging
- SOP(A) – Senior Officer Present (Ashore)
- SOPA – Senior Officer Present Afloat
- SOQ – Sailor of the Quarter
- SOY – Sailor of the Year
- SPAWAR – Space and Naval Warfare Systems Command
- SPAWARSYSCEN – Space and Naval Warfare Systems Center
- SR – Seaman Recruit
- SRB – Selective Reenlistment Bonus
- SRW – Shutdown Roving Watch
- SS – Submarine Specialist
- SS – Submarine, class/type of ship
- SSBN (aka Boomers) – Hull classification symbol for ballistic missile submarine (Submersible Ship Ballistic Nuclear)
- SSES – Ships Signals Exploitation Space: compartment on a ship where embarked NAVSECGRU personnel, known a Cryptologic Technicians, do their work
- SSGN – Hull classification symbol for cruise missile submarine (Submersible Ship Guided Missile Nuclear)
- SSMG – Ships Service Motor Generator; engine room equipment used to convert electric current from AC to DC or DC to AC
- SSN – Hull classification symbol for general-purpose fast attack submarines (Submersible Ship Nuclear)
- SSOQ – Senior Sailor of the Quarter
- SSOY – Senior Sailor of the Year
- SSTG – Ships Service Turbine Generator
- STA-21 - Seaman To Admiral 2021
- STG – Sonar Technician Surface
- STREAM – Standard Tension Replenishment Alongside Method
- STS – Sonar Technician Submarines
- SUBRON – Submarine Squadron
- SUBSAFE – Submarine Safety Program
- SUPPO – Supply Officer
- SWCC (swick) – Special Warfare Combatant-craft Crewmen, the Special Operations Forces who operate and maintain an inventory of boats used to conduct special operations missions or to support special operations missions conducted in maritime environments, particularly those of the U.S. Navy SEALs.
- SWO – Surface Warfare Officer

=== T ===
- TAD – Temporary Additional Duty, equivalent to Army's TDY
- TADCEN – Training and Distribution Center
- TAO – Tactical action officer (fights the ship under the supervision of the captain)
- TAR – Training and Administration of the Reserve (U.S. Navy Reserve, former designation for FTS personnel)
- TE – Task element
- TF – Task force
- TFO – Temporary flight orders. Non-aircrew personnel that have passed the minimum requirements to act as part of the aircrew for some purpose, e.g. secondary door gunner.
- TFOA – Things falling off aircraft
- TG – Task group
- TLD – Temporary limited duty
- TM – Torpedoman's mate
- TOPGUN – United States Navy Fighter Weapons School
- TSP – Troubled systems process
- TU – Task unit
- TYCOM – Type commanders

=== U ===
- UA – Unauthorized Absence
- UA – Urinalysis
- UAS – Unmanned Aerial System
- UAV – Unmanned Aerial Vehicle
- UCMJ – Uniform Code of Military Justice
- UCT – Underwater Construction Team
- UDT – Underwater Demolition Team
- UNODIR – Unless Otherwise Directed
- UNREP – Underway Replenishment
- UNSAT – Unsatisfactory
- UOD – Uniform of the day
- URL – Unrestricted Line Officer
- USCG – United States Coast Guard
- USMC – United States Marine Corps, organized under the United States Department of the Navy
- USN – United States Navy
- USNA – United States Naval Academy (Annapolis)
- USNR – United States Naval Reserve
- USS – United States Ship
- UT - Utilitiesman
- UWT – Underwater Telephone

=== V ===
- VA/VAM – Fixed Wing Attack/Fixed Wing Medium Attack (no longer used)
- VAQ – Fixed Wing Electronic-Attack Squadron
- VAW – Fixed Wing Airborne Early Warning Squadron
- VBSS – Visit, Board, Search, and Seizure
- VCNO – Vice Chief of Naval Operations
- VDS – Variable Depth Sonar
- VERTREP – Vertical Replenishment
- VF – Fixed Wing Fighter (no longer used)
- VFA – Fixed Wing Strike Fighter Squadron
- VLS – Vertical Launching System
- VP – Fixed Wing Patrol Squadron
- VRC – Fleet Logistics Support Squadron (VRC-30 Providers)
- VTU – Volunteer Training Unit
- VX – Air Test & Evaluation Squadron (VX-4 Evaluators)

=== W ===
- WAVES – Women Accepted for Volunteer Emergency Service
- WCS – Workcenter Supervisor
- WO – Warrant Officer
- WSO – (Wizzo) – Weapon Systems Officer (Naval Flight Officer) in USMC F/A-18D Hornet and USN F/A-18F Super Hornet)
- WTC – Watertight Compartment
- WTD – Watertight Door
- WTF – Whiskey Tango Foxtrot, usually an interrogative phrase, but may also be used in a declarative manner
- WTH – Water Tight Hatch

=== X ===
- XO – Executive Officer

=== Y ===
- YN – Yeoman

== See also ==
- List of acronyms
- List of military slang terms
- Glossary of nautical terms (A-L)
- Glossary of nautical terms (M-Z)
- Sailors' superstitions
- United States Navy bureau system
- List of U.S. government and military acronyms
  - List of U.S. Marine Corps acronyms and expressions
  - List of U.S. Air Force acronyms and expressions
