= Michael Colley =

United States Navy admiral (1938–2013)

Michael C. Colley
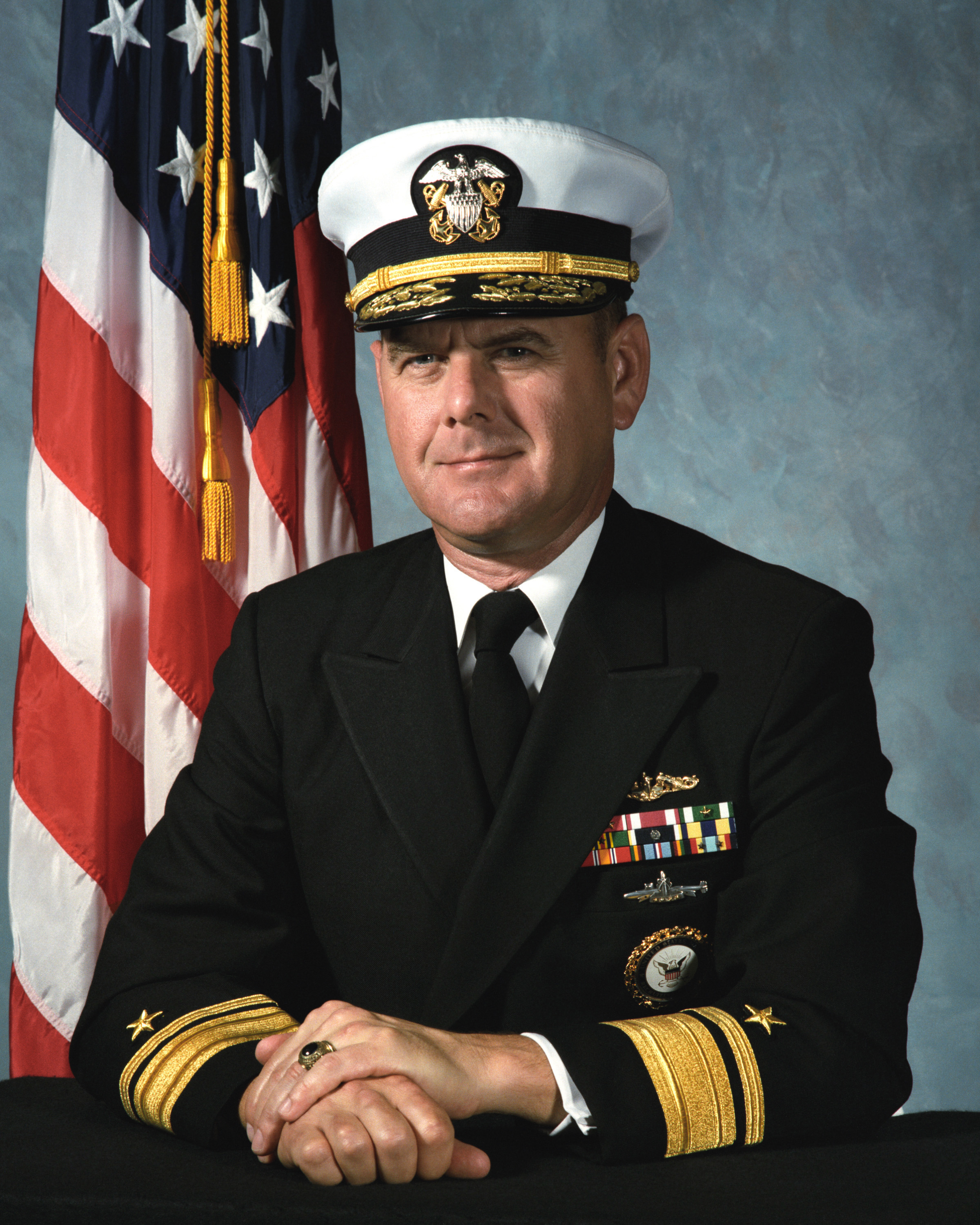
- Colley as a Rear Admiral in 1987
- Born: February 19, 1938; Wheaton, Minnesota, U.S.
- Died: January 19, 2013 (aged 74); Gulf Shores, Alabama, U.S.
- Military career
- Allegiance: United States
- Branch: United States Navy
- Rank: Vice admiral
- Commands: USS Narwhal (SSN-671); USS Proteus (AS-19); Submarine Force, Pacific Fleet
- Conflicts: Gulf War
- Other work: Libertarian Party

Michael Christian Colley, USN (Ret.), (February 19, 1938 – January 19, 2013) was a United States Navy officer who served as vice admiral and whose career included several high-ranking commands in the submarine force and elsewhere in national security positions.

== Early life ==
Colley was born in Wheaton, Minnesota, on February 19, 1938.

== Military career ==
Colley graduated with distinction from the United States Naval Academy in June 1960. He had sea duty assignments on several nuclear-powered submarines and was Commanding Officer of the attack submarine Narwhal. He was Commander of the Navy Recruiting Command for three years, and Deputy Commander of the submarine directorate in the Pentagon. He earned a master's degree in Computer Systems from the Naval Postgraduate School. Other operational assignments included command of the submarine tender Proteus in Guam and the Navy's largest submarine squadron in Groton, Connecticut. During the first Gulf War, he was commander of the Pacific Fleet submarine force of over 40 boats from his headquarters at Pearl Harbor. Earlier, he was Director, Division of Mathematics and Science (including the departments of math, physics, chemistry, oceanography and computer science) at the Naval Academy.

== Activism and views ==
After leaving the navy, Colley was active in the national security policy and analysis field, intelligence evaluation and senior management level positions in the public sector. He joined the Libertarian Party in 2003 and served as an elected member of the Libertarian National Committee from 2004 to 2010. Colley always advocated that the purpose of the United States military was defense and "not to serve as the world policeman," or "build democracy or engage in nation-building." Colley was interested in civil liberties issues and opposed government regulation "of all facets of our lives." On immigration, he welcomed people coming to the United States to "enjoy the freedoms we have" and opposed building a fence on the U.S.-Mexico border.

== Death ==
Admiral Colley died unexpectedly at his home in Gulf Shores, Alabama on January 19, 2013. The ashes of Colley and his wife Arlen Carol Colley (1938–2001) were interred at Arlington National Cemetery.
