= Phillip G. Sawyer =

United States Navy Vice admiral

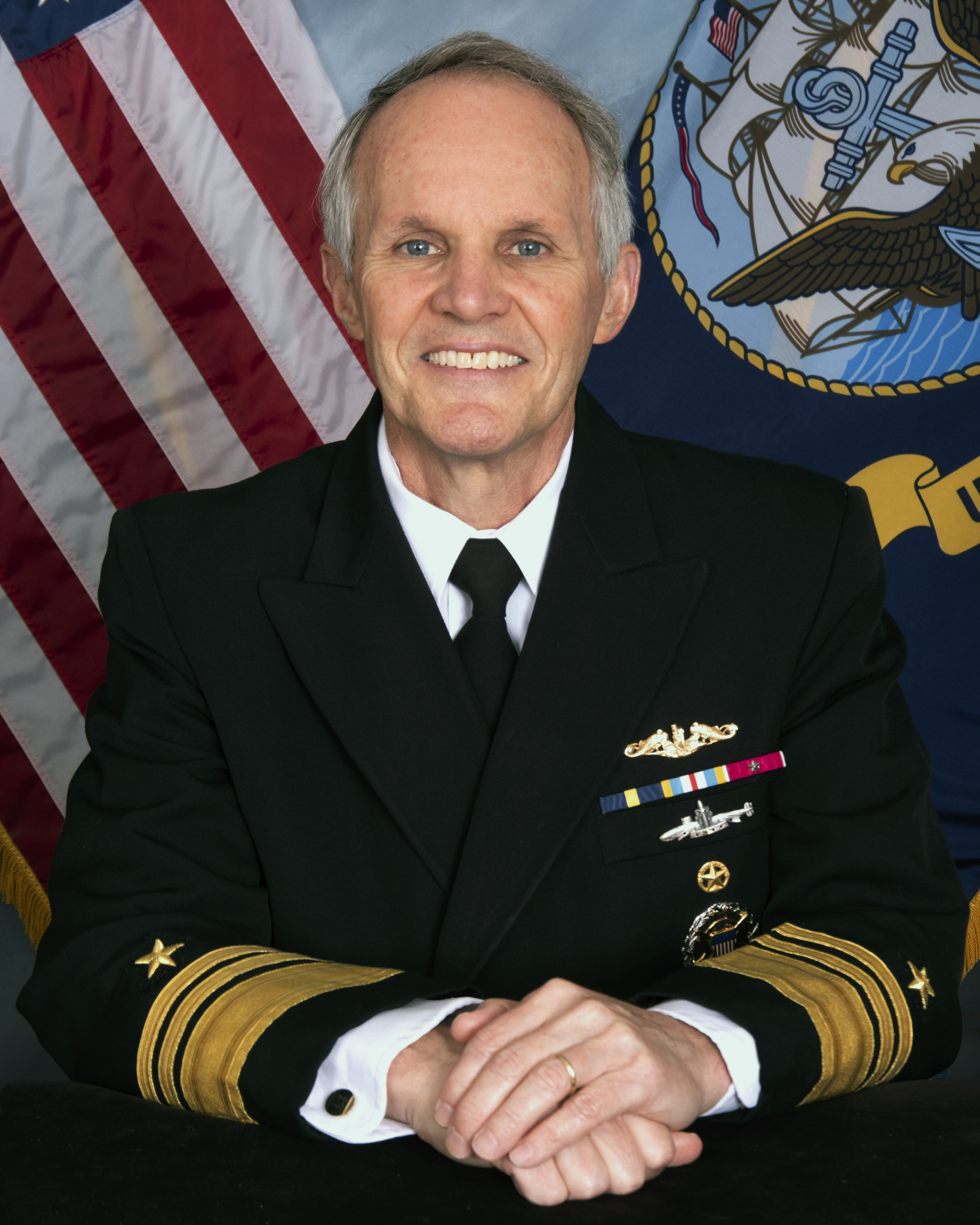
- Official portrait, August 2020
- Born: 1961 (age 64–65); Phoenix, Arizona, U.S.
- Military career
- Allegiance: United States
- Branch: United States Navy
- Service years: 1983–2021
- Rank: Vice Admiral
- Commands: United States Seventh Fleet; Submarine Force, U.S. Pacific Fleet; Task Force 74; Submarine Squadron 15; USS La Jolla (SSN 701)
- Awards: Navy Distinguished Service Medal; Defense Superior Service Medal; Legion of Merit (6)

Phillip Grayson Sawyer (born 1961) is a retired vice admiral in the United States Navy, who served as the Deputy Chief of Naval Operations for Operations, Plans and Strategy from October 10, 2019, to August 6, 2021. He previously served as commander for naval mine and anti-submarine warfare, and commander of United States Seventh Fleet, stationed at Japan.

Sawyer also served as a commander of Submarine Force, United States Pacific Fleet and commander of Task Force 74/54. As a deputy commander, he served United States Pacific Fleet, and as commander of Seventh Fleet.

== Education ==
Sawyer was born in Phoenix, Arizona. In 1983, he graduated with a Bachelor of Science in Systems Engineering from the United States Naval Academy. Later, he received a master's degree in Engineering Management from Old Dominion University.

== Naval career ==
As a career submarine officer, Sawyer was a division officer aboard USS Bluefish (SSN-675), and an engineering officer aboard USS Florida (SSGN-728). He also served as an executive officer of a Los Angeles-class submarine USS Salt Lake City (SSN-716). Later, he was assigned to command another Los Angeles-class submarine USS La Jolla at Submarine Squadron in Guam when Sawyer was appointed to senior officer present afloat.

On shore, Sawyer was appointed to branch chief in Joint Chiefs of Staff for anti-terrorism and force protection. He was also appointed deputy director for operations at COMPACFLT and executive assistant to the vice commander-in-chief for Pacific Fleet. Later, he served at the Bureau of Naval Personnel as a placement officer and assistant captain detailer. Sawyer was later appointed to Fleet Anti-Submarine Warfare Training Center, Atlantic, where he served as an instructor. He was later appointed to the office of United States Strategic Command as chief of staff for special activities and for submarine force Atlantic.

He retired at the end of 2021.

Military offices
Preceded by James F. Caldwell Jr.	Commander of the Submarine Force, U.S. Pacific Fleet; 2013–2015	Succeeded by Fritz Roegge
Preceded by ???	Deputy Commander of the United States Pacific Fleet; 2015–2017	Succeeded by Matthew Carter
Preceded by Joseph Aucoin	Commander of the United States Seventh Fleet; 2017–2019	Succeeded by William R. Merz
Preceded by Stuart B. Munsch	Deputy Chief of Naval Operations for Operations, Plans and Strategy of the United States Navy; 2019–2021	Succeeded by William R. Merz
