= Barry Cornish =

U.S. Air Force general

Barry R. Cornish
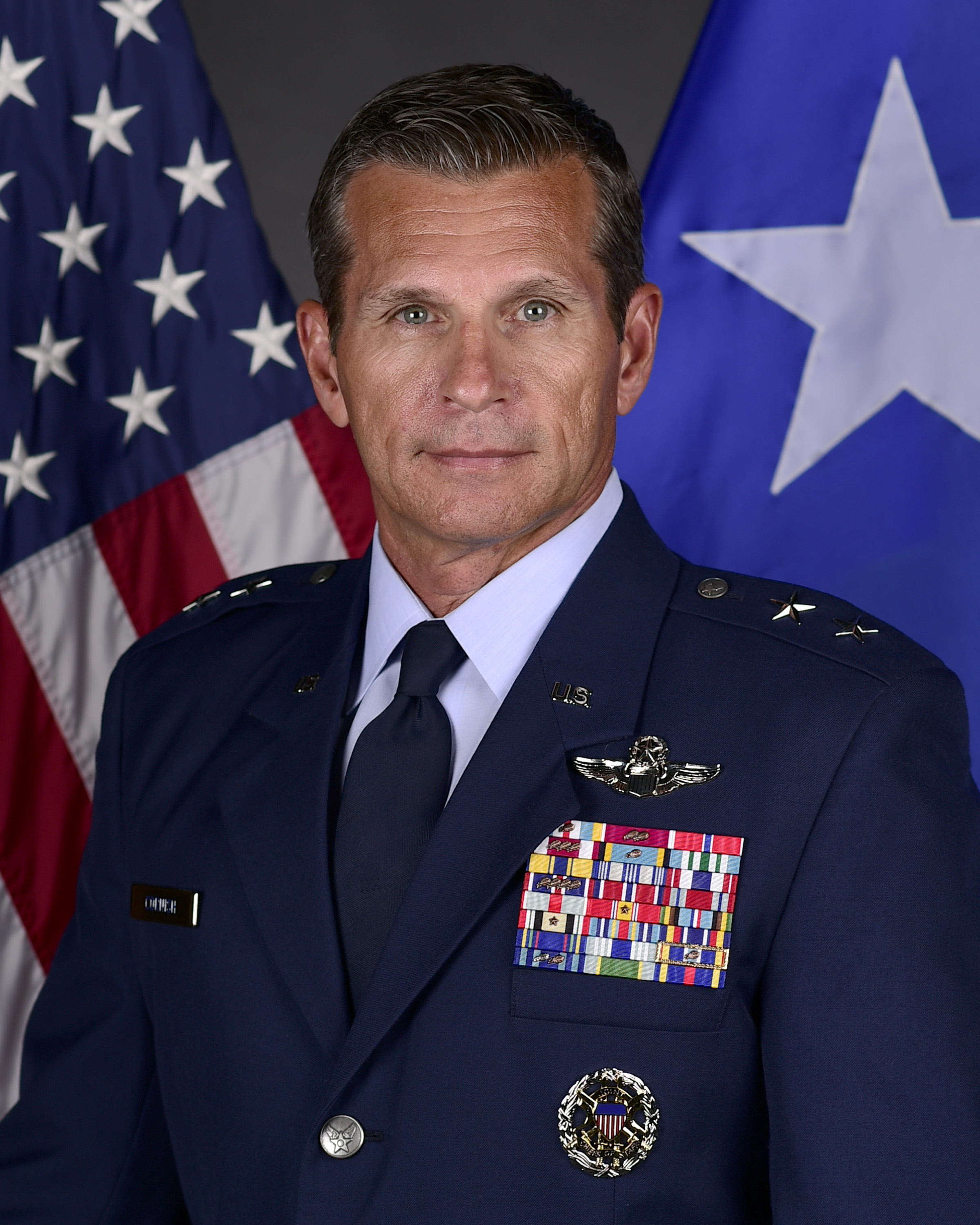
- Military career
- Allegiance: United States
- Branch: United States Air Force
- Service years: 1990–2022
- Rank: Major general
- Commands: Twelfth Air Force; 9th Air and Space Expeditionary Task Force-Afghanistan; 18th Wing; 99th Air Base Wing
- Conflicts: Iraq War
- Awards: Defense Superior Service Medal (2); Legion of Merit (3); Bronze Star Medal

Barry R. Cornish is a retired United States Air Force major general who last served as the commander of the Twelfth Air Force. Previously, he was the special assistant to the commander of the Air Force Combat Command.

Military offices
Preceded by James Hecker	Commander of the 18th Wing; 2015–2017	Succeeded by Case Cunningham
Preceded by Barre Seguin	Commander of the 9th Air and Space Expeditionary Task Force-Afghanistan; 2019–2020	Succeeded by Daniel Lasica
Preceded by Andrew A. Croft	Commander of the Twelfth Air Force; 2020–present	Succeeded by Evan L. Pettus
