= Commander, Submarine Force, U.S. Pacific Fleet =

Advisor to U.S. Pacific Fleet Commander on submarine matters

Commander Submarine Force, U.S. Pacific Fleet
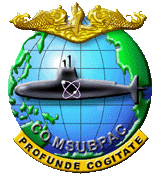
- COMSUBPAC Emblem
- Active: 1914-Present
- Country: United States of America
- Branch: United States Navy
- Type: Type Commander
- Role: Advisory
- Garrison/HQ: Pearl Harbor

Commanders
- Current commander: Rear Admiral Christopher J. Cavanaugh

The Commander, Submarine Force, U.S. Pacific Fleet (COMSUBPAC) is the principal advisor to the Commander, United States Pacific Fleet (COMPACFLT) for submarine matters. The Pacific Submarine Force (SUBPAC) includes attack, ballistic missile and auxiliary submarines, submarine tenders, floating submarine docks, deep submergence vehicles and submarine rescue vehicles throughout the Pacific.

The Force provides anti-submarine warfare, anti-surface ship warfare, precision land strike, mine warfare, intelligence, surveillance and early warning and special warfare capabilities to the U.S. Indo-Pacific Command and strategic deterrence capabilities to the U.S. Strategic Command.

COMSUBPAC's mission is to provide the training, logistical plans, manpower and operational plans and support and tactical development necessary to maintain the ability of the Force to respond to both peacetime and wartime demands.

== Submarines and Units ==
The units and submarines reporting to Submarine Force, U.S. Pacific Fleet are:

=== Fleet Activities Yokosuka ===
Fleet Activities Yokosuka in Yokosuka, Japan is home to Submarine Group 7.

=== Naval Station Pearl Harbor ===
Naval Station Pearl Harbor, in Hawaii, is home to the following submarine squadrons:

- Commander, Submarine Squadron 1 (CSS 1):
  - Virginia-class submarines:
    - USS Hawaii (SSN-776)
    - USS North Carolina (SSN-777)
    - USS Mississippi (SSN-782)
    - USS North Dakota (SSN-784)
    - USS Illinois (SSN-786)
    - USS Vermont (SSN-792)
    - USS Montana (SSN-794)
- Commander, Submarine Squadron 7 (CSS 7):
  - Los Angeles-class submarines:
    - USS Charlotte (SSN-766)
    - USS Toledo (SSN-769)
    - USS Tucson (SSN-770)
  - Virginia-class submarines:
    - USS Missouri (SSN-780)
    - USS Colorado (SSN-788)
    - USS Indiana (SSN-789)

=== Naval Base Kitsap ===
Naval Base Kitsap, in Bremerton, Washington, is home to Submarine Group 9 and the following submarine squadrons:

- Commander, Submarine Squadron 17 (CSS 17):
  - Ohio-class submarines:
    - USS Henry M. Jackson (SSBN-730)
    - USS Alabama (SSBN-731)
    - USS Nevada (SSBN-733)
    - USS Kentucky (SSBN-737)
    - USS Nebraska (SSBN-739)
    - USS Maine (SSBN-741)
    - USS Louisiana (SSBN-743)
- Commander, Submarine Squadron 19 (CSS 19):
  - Los Angeles-class submarines:
    - USS San Juan (SSN-751) (Active (Reserve), Awaiting decommissioning)
    - USS Topeka (SSN-754) (Active (Reserve), Awaiting decommissioning)
  - Ohio-class submarines:
    - USS Ohio (SSBN-726)
    - USS Michigan (SSBN-727)
    - USS Pennsylvania (SSBN-735)
- Commander, Submarine Development Squadron 5 (COMSUBDEVRON Five):
  - Seawolf-class submarines:
    - USS Seawolf (SSN-21)
    - USS Connecticut (SSN-22)
    - USS Jimmy Carter (SSN-23)
- Commander, Unmanned Undersea Vehicle Group 1 (COMUUVGRU One)
  - Unmanned Undersea Vehicle Squadron One (UUVRON One)
  - Unmanned Undersea Vehicle Squadron Three (UUVRON Three)

=== Naval Base Point Loma ===
Naval Base Point Loma, in San Diego, California, is home to the following submarine squadrons:

- Commander, Submarine Squadron 11 (CSS 11):
  - Los Angeles-class submarines:
    - USS Scranton (SSN-756)
    - USS Alexandria (SSN-757)
    - USS Santa Fe (SSN-763)
    - USS Hampton (SSN-767)
    - USS Greeneville (SSN-772)
  - USS Arco (ARDM-5)
  - Undersea Rescue Command

=== Naval Base Guam ===
Naval Base Guam, in Guam, is home to the following submarine squadrons:

- Commander, Submarine Squadron 15 (CSS 15):
  - Los Angeles-class submarines:
    - USS Asheville (SSN-758)
    - USS Jefferson City (SSN-759)
    - USS Annapolis (SSN-760)
    - USS Springfield (SSN-761)
  - Virginia-class submarines:
    - USS Minnesota (SSN-783)

=== Naval Support Activity Bahrain ===
Naval Support Activity Bahrain, in Guam, is home to the forward deployed Submarine Squadron 21 (CSS 21)

== Officers serving as COMSUBPAC ==
- Rear Admiral Wilhelm L. Friedell, 1939–1941
- Rear Admiral Thomas Withers, Jr., 1941–May 1942
- Rear Admiral Robert H. English, May 1942–20 January 1943 (killed in an aircraft accident)
- Captain John H. "Babe" Brown (pro tem), 20 Jan 1943–1943
- Vice Admiral Charles A. Lockwood, 1943–1946
- Rear Admiral Allan Rockwell McCann, 1946–1948
- Rear Admiral Oswald S. Colclough, 1948–1949
- Rear Admiral John H. "Babe" Brown, 1949–1951
- Rear Admiral Charles B. "Swede" Momsen, 1951–1953
- Rear Admiral George L. Russell, 1953–1955
- Rear Admiral Leon J. Huffman, 1955–1956
- Rear Admiral Elton W. "Joe" Grenfell, 1956–1959^{†}
- Rear Admiral William E. "Pete" Ferrall, 1959–1960^{†}
- Rear Admiral Roy S. "Ensign" Benson, 1960–1962^{†}
- Rear Admiral Bernard A. "Chick" Clarey, 1962–1964^{†}
- Rear Admiral Eugene B. "Lucky" Fluckey, 1964–1966^{†}
- Rear Admiral John H. Maurer, 1966–1968^{†}
- Rear Admiral Walter L. Small, 1968–1970^{†}
- Rear Admiral Paul L. Lacy, Jr., 1970–1972 (Last WW2 submarine skipper in the job)
- Rear Admiral Frank D. McMullen, 1972-1975
- Rear Admiral Charles H. Griffiths, 1975-1977
- Rear Admiral William J. Cowhill, 1977-1979
- Rear Admiral Nils R. Thunman, 1979-1981
- Rear Admiral Bernard M. Kauderer, 1981-1983
- Rear Admiral Austin B. Scott, Jr., 1983-1985
- Rear Admiral James N. Darby, 1985-1987
- Rear Admiral Ralph W. West, Jr., 1987-1987
- Rear Admiral James G. Reynolds, 1987-1989
- Rear Admiral Michael C. Colley, 1989-1991
- Rear Admiral Henry C. McKinney, 1991-1993
- Rear Admiral Jon M. Barr, 1993-1996
- Rear Admiral Winford G. Ellis, 1996-1998
- Rear Admiral Albert H. Konetzni, Jr., 1998-2001
- Rear Admiral John B. Padgett, III, 2001-2003
- Rear Admiral Paul F. Sullivan, 2003-2005
- Rear Admiral Jeffrey B. Cassias, 2005-2006
- Rear Admiral Joseph A. Walsh, 2006-2008
- Rear Admiral Douglas J. McAneny, 2008–2010
- Rear Admiral James F. Caldwell, Jr., 2010–2013
- Rear Admiral Phillip G. Sawyer, 2013–2015
- Rear Admiral Frederick J. Roegge, 2015–2017
- Rear Admiral Daryl Caudle, 2017–2019
- Rear Admiral Blake L. Converse, 2019–2021
- Rear Admiral Jeffrey T. Jablon, 2021–2023
- Rear Admiral Richard E. Seif Jr., 2023–2025
- Rear Admiral Christopher J. Cavanaugh, 2025–present

^{†} Wartime submarine skipper

== See also ==
- COMSUBLANT
- COMNAVSUBFOR
