= USS Jacksonville =

Los Angeles-class nuclear-powered attack submarine of the US Navy

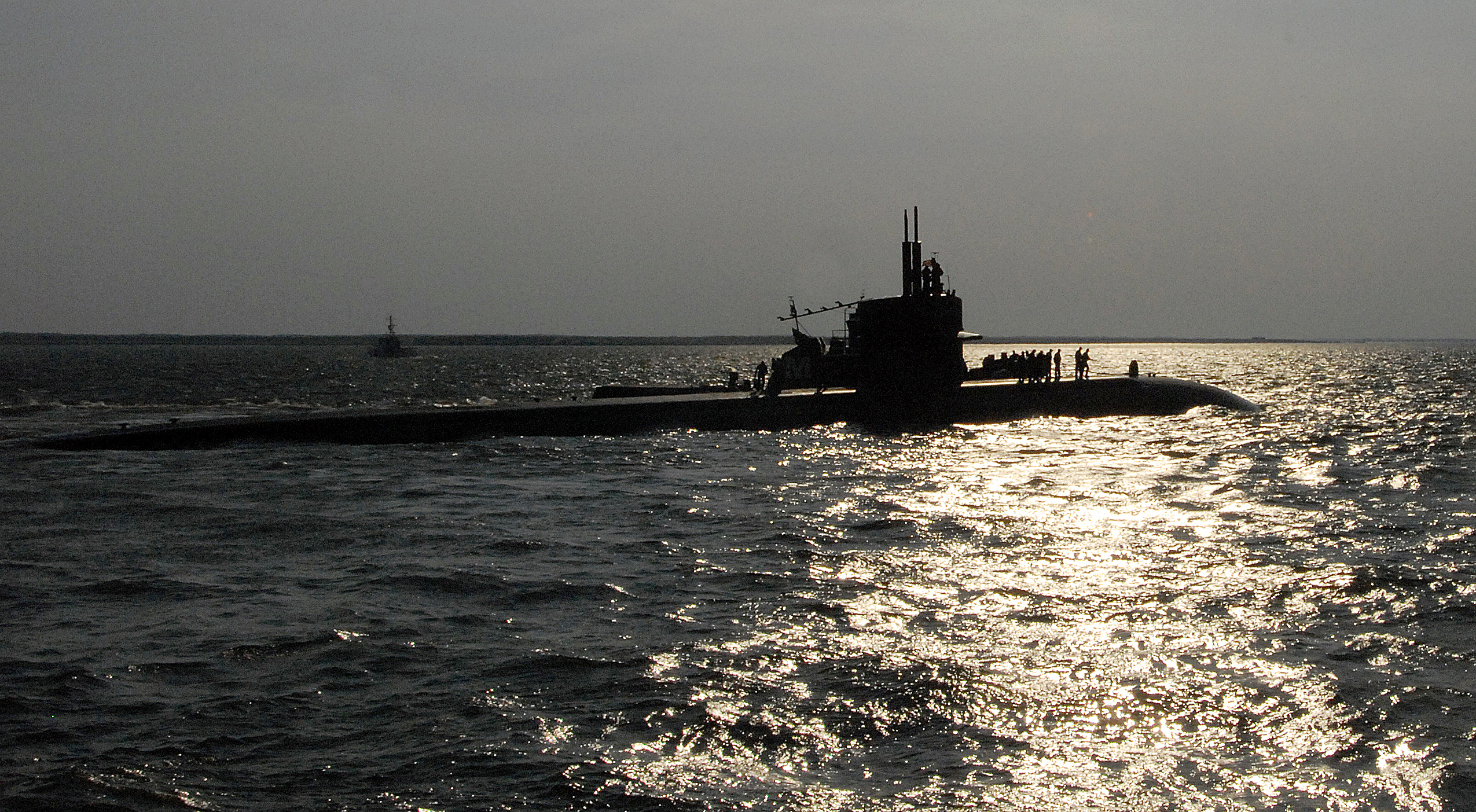
- USS Jacksonville in 2009

History

United States
- Name: USS Jacksonville
- Namesake: City of Jacksonville, Florida
- Ordered: 24 January 1972
- Builder: General Dynamics Electric Boat
- Laid down: 21 February 1976
- Launched: 18 November 1978
- Commissioned: 16 May 1981
- Decommissioned: 16 November 2021
- Out of service: 1 May 2018
- Status: Decommissioned
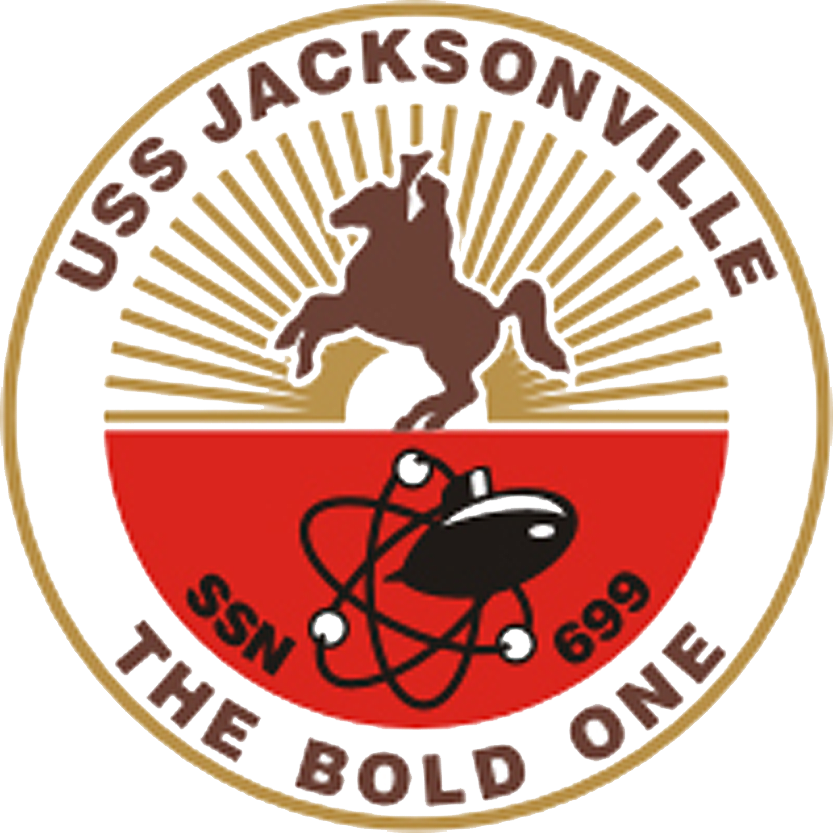
- Badge

General characteristics
- Class & type: Los Angeles-class submarine
- Displacement: 5,720 tons light, 6,149 tons full, 429 tons dead
- Length: 110.3 m (362 ft)
- Beam: 10 m (33 ft)
- Draft: 9.7 m (32 ft)
- Propulsion: One S6G reactor
- Complement: 12 officers, 98 men

USS Jacksonville (SSN-699), a nuclear powered Los Angeles-class attack submarine, is the only vessel of the United States Navy to be named for Jacksonville, Florida.

Jacksonville was overhauled and modernized in 1988 and over the career span was involved in four collisions between 1982 and 2013. After completing a final deployment in 2017, ending 36 years of active service, the submarine was decommissioned in 2021.

== History ==
The contract to build her was awarded to the Electric Boat Division of General Dynamics Corporation in Groton, Connecticut, on 24 January 1972 and her keel was laid down on 21 February 1976. She was launched on 18 November 1978 using the pontoon system designed for the launching of the Ohio-class Trident submarines. Jacksonville was sponsored by Mrs. Dorothy Jean Bennett, wife of Congressman Charles E. Bennett, and commissioned on 16 May 1981.

Jacksonville's operations have included a variety of fleet exercises and deployments including two around-the-world cruises in 1982 and 1985, deployments to the western Atlantic Ocean in 1983, 1986, 1993 and 1994, and deployments to the Mediterranean Sea in 1987, 1993, 1997, 1999/2000, and 2001. She was deployed in 2001 during the events of 9/11 and stayed on station until relieved. In 1988, Jacksonville participated in a shock trials test program for Los Angeles-class submarines, which was followed by a three-year major modernization overhaul in Norfolk Naval Shipyard.

Jacksonville has been involved in four collisions with other vessels during her over 30 years of operation:

- While outbound with the inbound Turkish merchant vessel General Z. Dogan in the vicinity of Norfolk, Virginia on 22 March 1982.
- With a barge positioned across Chesapeake Bay's Thimble Shoal Channel, requiring the replacement of the submarine's sonar dome, on 21 September 1984.
- With the container ship Saudi Makkah near the mouth of the Chesapeake Bay, requiring repairs to the submarine's fairwater planes and rudder, on 17 May 1996.
- With an unnamed fishing vessel while on regular patrol in the Persian Gulf on 10 January 2013. Her main periscope was sheared off in the collision. The ship's commanding and executive officers were relieved for cause following the incident.

In late 2009, Jacksonville's homeport was moved from Norfolk to Pearl Harbor.

On 20 December 2004 a small fire broke out aboard Jacksonville while she was undergoing a refueling overhaul at the Portsmouth Naval Shipyard. The fire was immediately extinguished and the reactor was never in danger, though a shipyard firefighter and a sailor were treated at the scene for smoke inhalation.

In August 2017, Jacksonville completed her final deployment, ending 36 years of Submarine Service. On 11 December 2017, she arrived in Bremerton, Washington, to commence a months-long preparation for inactivation and decommissioning.

On 26 June 2019, Jacksonville held an inactivation ceremony at the U.S. Naval Undersea Museum in Keyport, Washington. Former Commanding Officer Michael Brown and former Chief of the Boat (also former Master Chief Petty Officer of the Navy) Terry Scott were among the speakers.

On 16 November 2021, Jacksonville was decommissioned in a ceremony at Puget Sound Naval Shipyard.

== Specifications ==
Jacksonville is 360 feet (110 m) long with a beam of 33 feet (10 m) and a draft of 32 feet 15 inches (10.13 m). The submarine is equipped with an S6G reactor that allows 15 knots surfaced and 32 plus knots submerged. The submarine can operate with an approximate 800 feet (240 m) depth range, 1,200 feet (370 m) safe depth, and 1,800 feet (550 m) crush depth.

Jacksonville has a crew of 12 officers and 121 enlisted personnel. The armament is four 533mm TT MK 67, located amidship for Tomahawk missiles, MK 48 (and MK 48 ADCAP) torpedoes with 22 reloads plus 2 additional for emergencies. The submarine was decommissioned in 2021.
