= Fire control technician =

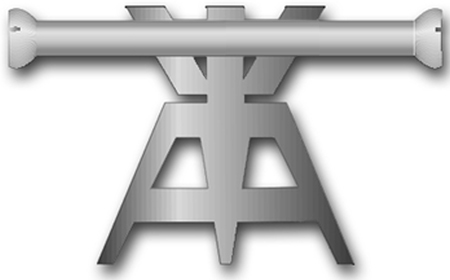
- Rating insignia
- Issued by: United States Navy
- Type: Enlisted rating
- Abbreviation: FT
- Specialty: Weapons / combat control systems

Fire control technician (FT) is a United States Navy occupational rating.

Fire control technicians perform organizational and intermediate level maintenance on United States Navy submarines combat control systems and equipment, and associated test equipment including tactical computer systems and peripherals.

The fire control technician is responsible for all operational and administrative aspects of the submarines computer and control mechanisms used in weapons systems and related programs.

== See also ==
- List of United States Navy ratings
