= Naval Reactors =

U.S. government office

Naval Reactors logo

Naval Reactors (NR), which administers the Naval Nuclear Propulsion Program, is an umbrella term for the U.S. government office that has comprehensive responsibility for the safe and reliable operation of the United States Navy's nuclear reactors "from womb to tomb". The deputy administrator for Naval Reactors concurrently serves as director of the Naval Nuclear Propulsion Program, establishing a single entity who has authority and reporting responsibilities within both the Naval Sea Systems Command (NAVSEA 08), reporting to the chief of naval operations, and the National Nuclear Security Administration (NNSA NA-30), reporting to the NNSA administrator.

Naval Reactors is headed by a Navy four-star admiral. The director serves for a nominal eight-year term of office, the longest standard assignment in the U.S. military. The program was originally created under Executive Order 12344 by President Ronald Reagan, on February 1, 1982. The director was concurrently assigned as the deputy administrator for Naval Reactors for the National Nuclear Security Administration via Pub. L. 98–525 (50 U.S.C. § 2406) on October 19, 1984 in order to assist them in the research, design, development, health, and safety matters pertaining to naval nuclear propulsion plants via 42 U.S.C. § 7158. Executive Order 12344 was made a permanent federal program via Pub. L. 106–65 (text) (PDF) of October 5, 1999 (50 U.S.C. § 2511).

== History ==
In June 1946, the chief of naval operations, Fleet Adm. Chester W. Nimitz decided to send five officers (including then Captain Hyman Rickover) and three civilians to Oak Ridge, Tennessee, to study the potential of using nuclear energy to power ships. The Navy group organized themselves under then Captain Rickover and embraced Philip Abelson's concept of a nuclear-powered submarine. The consensus of the group was that the technical difficulties could be overcome, and nuclear power could be used as a means for propelling Navy ships.

On January 1, 1947, Congress established the Atomic Energy Commission and assigning it responsibilities for nuclear reactor plant development. Later that month, Chief of Naval Operations, Fleet Adm. Chester W. Nimitz, approved a program for the design and development of nuclear power plants in submarines.

As of 1947, there was only limited experience with nuclear reactors. The United States had three reactors for producing nuclear material for atomic weapons, and five small research reactors. There was no readily available knowledge on operating a reactor that would produce power in a usable form. Developing a power reactor would require new corrosion resistant metals which could sustain prolonged periods of intense radiation, thick shielding to protect personnel from radiation, and new components which would operate safely and reliably.

These problems were even more difficult for submarine application since the reactor and its associated steam plant had to fit within the confines of the comparatively small hull, and be able to withstand extreme battle shock incident to the operation of combatant ships. The propulsion plant had to be operated and maintained at sea by Naval officers and enlisted men who, although specially trained, were not physicists or scientists. Although application of nuclear power to submarines was a major challenge, it was generally recognized that success would transform submarine warfare. Submerged operation of submarines of the World War II era was limited by battery power and was measured in hours to a few days. Because nuclear fission produced heat without consuming oxygen, a true submarine was possible, one which could remain submerged and steam at sustained high speed for long periods.

Captain (later Admiral) Hyman G. Rickover quickly became the principal early advocate of nuclear marine propulsion. In February 1949 he received an assignment to the Division of Reactor Development, United States Atomic Energy Commission and then assumed control of the Navy's effort as Director of the Naval Reactors Branch in the Bureau of Ships.

Progress was made quickly with countless technological and engineering questions being raised, assessed, and resolved. The whole program was a prime example of what is now known as concurrent engineering with the prototype being prepared as the design progressed and construction of the first nuclear powered submarine (SSN 571 Nautilus) progressing close behind. The results were known as a great success, and a testament to Rickover's style of management and getting complex engineering done. These are some of the notable results achieved from 1949 – 1955:

- August 1950 – S1W reactor prototype construction started
- June 1952 – President Truman lays Nautilus keel
- March 1953 – Prototype initial critical reactor operation
- June 1953 – Prototype full power operation
- January 1954 – Nautilus launched by Mamie Eisenhower
- September 1954 – Nautilus commissioned
- December 1954 – Nautilus initial critical operation
- January 1955 – Nautilus "Underway on nuclear power"
- May 1955 – Nautilus submerged 1,100 nm transit from New London CT to San Juan Puerto Rico in 90 hours

Within seven years of its inception, the organization had constructed the nation's first power reactor. The following four years would see three more nuclear submarines and two reactor plant prototypes operating and another seven ships and two prototypes being built. To date, more reactors have been built and safely operated by the NR program than any other US program.

The office was originally a joint activity of the U.S. Atomic Energy Commission (AEC) and the U.S. Navy's Bureau of Ships. When the AEC was abolished, Naval Reactors became a joint effort of the Navy and the Energy Research and Development Administration, which partly replaced the AEC. In 1977, ERDA was combined with the Federal Energy Administration to form the U.S. Department of Energy. On the Navy side of the organization, the Bureau of Ships has transitioned since the 1950s to become the Naval Sea Systems Command (NAVSEA), within which NR is Code 08, usually abbreviated NAVSEA 08 or SEA 08.

Admiral Rickover parlayed an impressive personal publicity effort and intensive links with the United States Congress into an unprecedented tenure as head of Naval Reactors whereby he could not be relieved by conventional military procedures. He was promoted, partially as a result of Congressional involvement, until he reached the rank of full Admiral and held the position for over 30 years from 1949 to February 1, 1982 (when he was retired).

The history of nuclear propulsion and Rickover's influence and involvement is substantial. Due to the importance and impact of nuclear power, the AEC commissioned the creation of two related historical records to capture important facts of both naval nuclear propulsion and the Shippingport commercial reactor. Both of these official documents necessarily contain a good deal of information on Rickover's choices, methods and technical philosophy in the development of practical nuclear power, but are not biographies. While Rickover cooperated to provide real-time access to facilities, people and records, according to the authors he did not edit; Rickover was in-fact deceased before the second document was completed. These are: (1) Nuclear Navy, 1946-1962 by AEC staff historians Richard G. Hewlett and Francis Duncan, and (2) Rickover and the Nuclear Navy: The Discipline of Technology by Francis Duncan. The AEC makes both of these documents directly available to the public in digital form.

== Management and personnel principles ==
Many books (including those referenced below) and articles have been written about core NR management principles such as attention to detail and adherence to rigidly defined standards and specifications, as well as the organization's unique (for government) personnel practices. NR staff and alumni (including Admiral Rickover himself) have often been called by Congress, the President and other government agencies to provide expert opinion and management support to other important government programs, most notably the large scale reviews following the destruction of the Space Shuttles Columbia and Challenger.

== Program elements ==
- Research, development, and support laboratories
- Nuclear Component Procurement Organization
- Nuclear power schools and Naval Reactors training facilities.
- Naval Nuclear Propulsion Program Headquarters and field offices
- Naval support facilities and tenders
- Shipyards that build, overhaul and service the propulsion plants of naval nuclear-powered vessels

== Facilities ==
Naval Reactors operates the Naval Nuclear Laboratory facilities, as well as the Nuclear Power Training Unit (NPTU) Charleston, in Charleston, South Carolina.

=== Naval Nuclear Laboratory ===
The Naval Nuclear Laboratory comprises four facilities, managed by the DOE and operated by Bechtel Marine Propulsion Corporation.

- Bettis Atomic Power Laboratory
- Knolls Atomic Power Laboratory
- Kenneth A. Kesselring Site in West Milton, New York
- Naval Reactors Facility (NRF), at Idaho National Laboratory

== List of directors ==
The Director of Naval Reactors also concurrently serves as a Deputy Administrator of the National Nuclear Security Administration.

No.	Director		Term			Commission
No.	Portrait	Name	Took office	Left office	Term length	Commission
1	Hyman G. Rickover	Admiral; Hyman G. Rickover (1900–1986)	February 1949	1 February 1982	~ 33 years, 0 days	1922 (USNA)
2	Kinnaird R. McKee	Admiral; Kinnaird R. McKee (1929–2013)	1 February 1982	22 October 1988	6 years, 264 days	1951 (USNA)
3	Bruce DeMars	Admiral; Bruce DeMars (1935–2024)	22 October 1988	27 September 1996	7 years, 341 days	1957 (USNA)
4	Frank L. Bowman	Admiral; Frank L. Bowman (born 1944)	27 September 1996	5 November 2004	8 years, 39 days	1966 (NROTC)
5	Kirkland H. Donald	Admiral; Kirkland H. Donald (born 1953)	5 November 2004	2 November 2012	7 years, 363 days	1975 (USNA)
6	John M. Richardson	Admiral; John M. Richardson (born 1960)	2 November 2012	14 August 2015	2 years, 285 days	1982 (USNA)
7	James F. Caldwell Jr.	Admiral; James F. Caldwell Jr. (born 1959)	14 August 2015	10 January 2024	8 years, 149 days	1981 (USNA)
8	William J. Houston	Admiral; William J. Houston (born 1968)	10 January 2024	Incumbent	2 years, 258 days	1990 (NROTC)
