= Submarine Squadron 7 =

Submarine Squadron Seven
- Active: World War II–present
- Country: United States of America
- Branch: United States Navy
- Part of: U.S. Pacific Fleet (USPACFLT)
- Garrison/HQ: Joint Base Pearl Harbor–Hickam

Commanders
- Commodore: Captain Corey Poorman
- Notable commanders: Richard O'Kane

Submarine Squadron 7 (also known as SUBRON 7) is a squadron of submarines of the United States Navy based at Joint Base Pearl Harbor–Hickam, Pearl Harbor, HI under the command of Captain Corey Poorman.

== History ==
Naval Historical Center records show Submarine Squadron SEVEN was first established during the Second World War, organized with two submarine divisions (COMSUBDIVs 71 and 72), whose mission was to conduct anti-submarine warfare (ASW) training. The command was home ported in Bermuda during the latter part of 1942 and consisted mostly of older R- and S- boats. In April 1943, the Operational Training Command, Atlantic Fleet was established with Rear Admiral D. B. Berry in charge. Operational control of Submarine Squadron Seven was shifted from the Commandant Naval Operating Base, Bermuda, to Commander Operational Training Command. Late in 1943 two Free French submarines were made available for the Training Command under United States supervision. Five more were added in 1944. After the invasion of Sicily and the landing at Anzio in January 1944, five Italian submarines came across the Atlantic in February 1944 and were assigned to ASW Training Command. These foreign submarines were assigned by COMSUBLANT to Submarine Squadron SEVEN. The French and Italian submarines were excellent for training purposes due to their heavy hull construction and they made good substitutes for the newly commissioned U.S. Navy submarines rerouted to the Pacific for combat duty. With the curtailment of the escort program, the activity at Bermuda was no longer needed and was transferred to Guantanamo Bay, Cuba. Following cessation of hostilities in the Pacific, Submarine Squadron SEVEN was disestablished in 1945. The current Submarine Squadron SEVEN was established in July 1951 at Naval Submarine Base, Pearl Harbor, Hawaii.

== Boats ==
The submarines that make up SUBRON 7 include:

- USS Charlotte (SSN-766)
- USS Toledo (SSN-769)
- USS Tucson (SSN-770)
- USS Columbia (SSN-771)
- USS Missouri (SSN-780)
- USS Colorado (SSN-788)
- USS Indiana (SSN-789)

== Commanders ==
- CAPT Christopher Kaiser - Aug 2008 to Aug 2010
- CAPT James Pitts - Aug 2010 to Aug 2012
- CAPT Rick Stoner - Aug 2012 to May 2014
- CAPT Craig Blakely - May 2014 to June 2016
- CAPT Robert Roncska - June 2016 to June 2018
- CAPT Paul Davis - June 2018 to January 2020
- CAPT Michael Majewski - January 2020 to June 2022
- CAPT Dave Cox - June 2022 to February 2024
- CAPT Corey Poorman - February 2024 to Present

== See also ==
- History of the United States Navy
