= Naval Station Pearl Harbor =

US naval base on Oahu, Hawaii

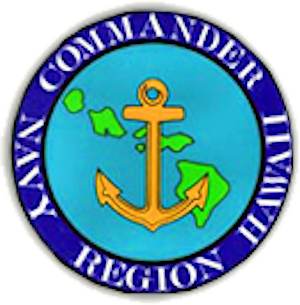
Naval Station Pearl Harbor
- Part of Navy Region Hawaii
- Oahu, Hawaii

Site information
- Type: Military base
- Controlled by: United States Navy
- Website: Official website

Location
- Location of Joint Base Pearl Harbor–Hickam on Oahu, Hawaii
- Location within Oahu Location within Hawaii
- Coordinates: 21.349270°N 157.943970°W

Site history
- In use: 1899–present

- Pearl Harbor, U.S. Naval Base
- U.S. National Register of Historic Places
- U.S. National Historic Landmark District
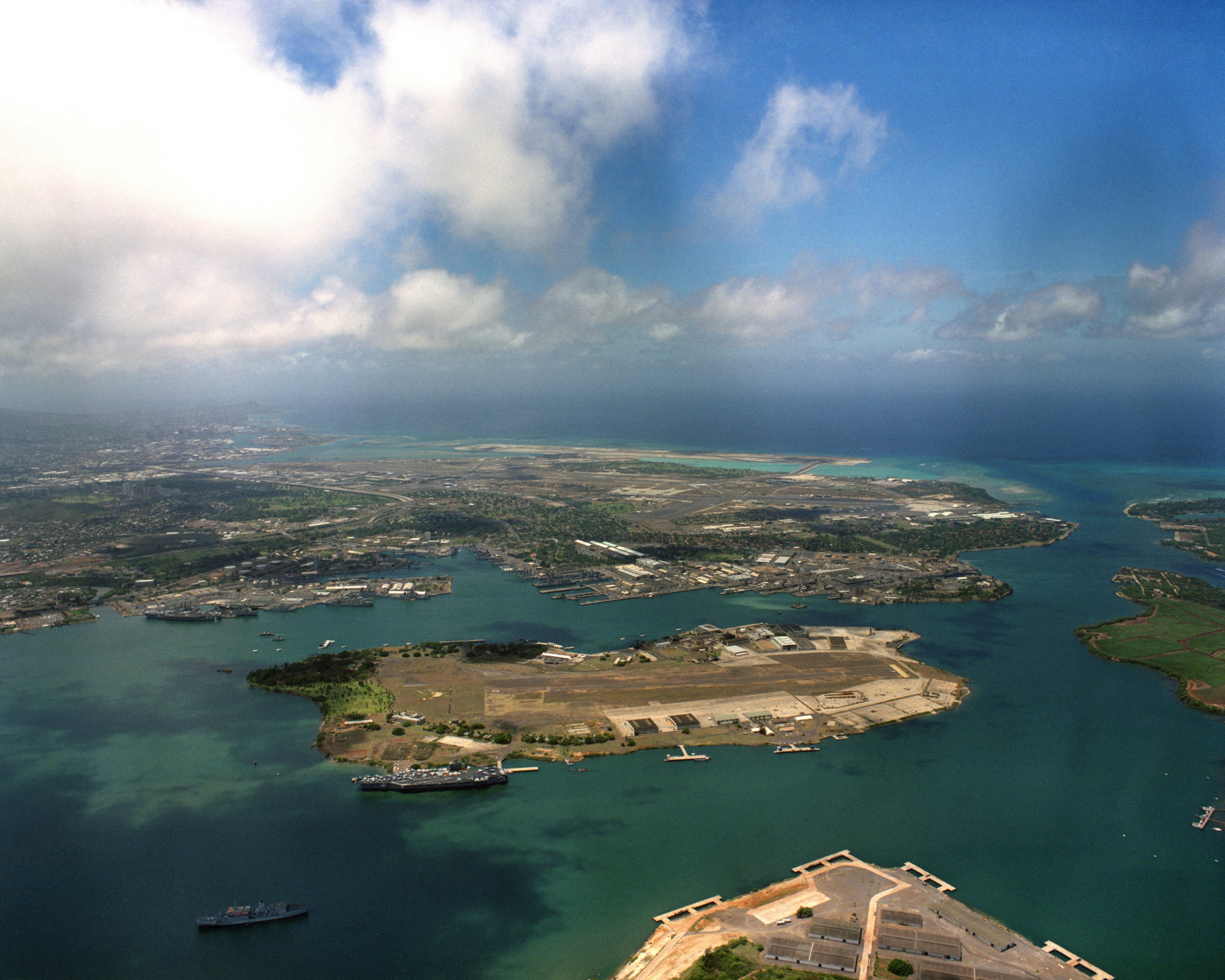
- Aerial view of Pearl Harbor, Ford Island in center. The Arizona memorial is the small white dot on the left side above Ford Island.

- Location within Hawaii
- Nearest city: Pearl City, Hawaiʻi
- Area: 13,107 acres (5,304 ha)
- Built: 1911
- NRHP reference No.: 66000940

Significant dates
- Added to NRHP: 15 October 1966
- Designated NHLD: 29 January 1964

Naval Station Pearl Harbor is a United States naval base on the island of Oahu, Hawaii. In 2010, as part of the recommendations of the Base Realignment and Closure (BRAC) commission, the naval station was consolidated with the United States Air Force's Hickam Air Force Base to form Joint Base Pearl Harbor–Hickam. Since 1940, Pearl Harbor has been the headquarters of the United States Pacific Fleet.

== Overview ==
Naval Station Pearl Harbor provides berthing and shore side support to surface ships and submarines, as well as maintenance and training. Pearl Harbor can accommodate the largest ships in the fleet, to include dry dock services, and is now home to over 160 commands. Housing, personnel, and family support are also provided and are an integral part of the shore side activities, which encompasses both permanent and transient personnel.

Because Pearl Harbor is the only intermediate maintenance facility for submarines in the Middle Pacific, it serves as host to a large number of visiting submariners.

The Naval Computer and Telecommunications Area Master Station, Pacific (NCTAMS PAC), Wahiawa, Hawaii is the world's largest communication station. The headquarters site of this shore command is located in the central section of the island of Oahu, approximately three miles north of Wahiawa.

Pearl Harbor is the headquarters for the Hawaii field office of the Naval Criminal Investigative Service.

== History ==
=== 1899–1941 ===
Following the annexation of Hawaii, Pearl Harbor was refitted to allow for more navy ships. In May 1899, Commander John F. Merry was made naval representative with authority to transact business for the Navy Department and its Bureaus. He immediately assumed control of the Coal Depot and its equipment. To supplement his facilities, he was assigned the Navy tug Iroquois and two coal barges. Inquiries that commenced in June culminated in the establishment of the "Naval Station, Honolulu" on 17 November 1899. On 2 February 1900, this title was changed to "Naval Station, Hawaii".

The creation of the Naval Station allowed the Navy Department to explore territorial outposts. In October 1899, Nero and Iroquois made extensive surveys and sounding of the waterways to Midway and Guam. One of the reasons for these explorations was to select a possible cable route to Luzon.

A coal famine and an outbreak of the bubonic plague were the only two incidents that hindered the Commandant from fulfilling his duties. Because of the severe coal shortage in September 1899, the Commandant sold coal to the Oahu Railway and Land Company and the Inter-Island Steam Navigation Company, Ltd. Although this indicated the affinity of economic ties with the Navy, it was to a certain extent counteracted by the quarantine of the naval establishment from December 1899 to February 1900, because of the bubonic plague. Approximately 61 deaths were recorded in Honolulu for this period. Work was consequently delayed on nascent Navy projects in Honolulu Harbor.

From 1900 to 1908, the Navy devoted its time to improving the facilities of the 85 acres (34 ha) that constituted the naval reservation in Honolulu. Under the Appropriation Act of 3 March 1901, this tract of land was improved with the erection of additional sheds and housing. Improvements included a machine shop, smithery and foundry, Commandant's house and stables, cottage for the watchman, fencing, 10-ton wharf crane, and water-pipe system. Pearl Harbor was dredged and the channel enlarged to accommodate larger ships. On 28 May 1903, the first battleship, Wisconsin, entered the harbor for coal and water. However, when the vessels of the Asiatic station visited Honolulu in January 1904, Rear Admiral Silas Terry complained that they were inadequately accommodated with dockage and water.

Under the above Appropriation Act, Congress approved the acquisition of lands for the development of a naval station at Pearl Harbor and the improvement of the channel to the Lochs. The Commandant, under the direction of the Bureau of Equipment, attempted to obtain options on lands surrounding Pearl Harbor that were recommended for naval use. This endeavor was unsuccessful when the owners of the property refused to accept what was deemed to be a fair price. Condemnation proceedings, under the Hawaiian law of eminent domain, were begun on 6 July 1901. The land acquired by this suit included the present Navy Yard, Kauhua Island, and a strip on the southeast coast of Ford Island. The work of dredging the coral reef that blocked Pearl Harbor progressed rapidly enough to allow the gunboat Petrel to proceed to the upper part of Main Loch in January 1905.

One of the early concerns of the growing station was that the Army would make claims on its property. Because of their facilities, as wharves, cranes, artesian wells, and coal supplies, many requests were made by the Army for their use. By February 1901, the Army had made application for the privilege of establishing on Navy docks movable cranes for handling coal and other stores, a saluting battery and a flag staff on the naval reservation, and an artesian well of its own. All these requests were rejected by the Bureau of Equipment on the theory that, once granted, they "will practically constitute a permanent foothold on the property, and end in dividing it between the two Departments, or in the entire exclusion of the Navy Department on the ground of military expediency as established by frequency of use." However, the Army Depot Quartermaster at Honolulu contracted for the sinking of an artesian well on the Naval Station with the Commandant's approval, who, in turn, acted on a recommendation of the Bureau of Yards and Docks. The flow of water obtained amounted to over 1.5 million gallons per day, sufficient for all purposes of the Army and Navy. The Bureau of Equipment felt that its word of caution was justified when the Depot Quartermaster in 1902 let it be known that any water used by the Navy from the artesian well was "only given by courtesy of the Army".

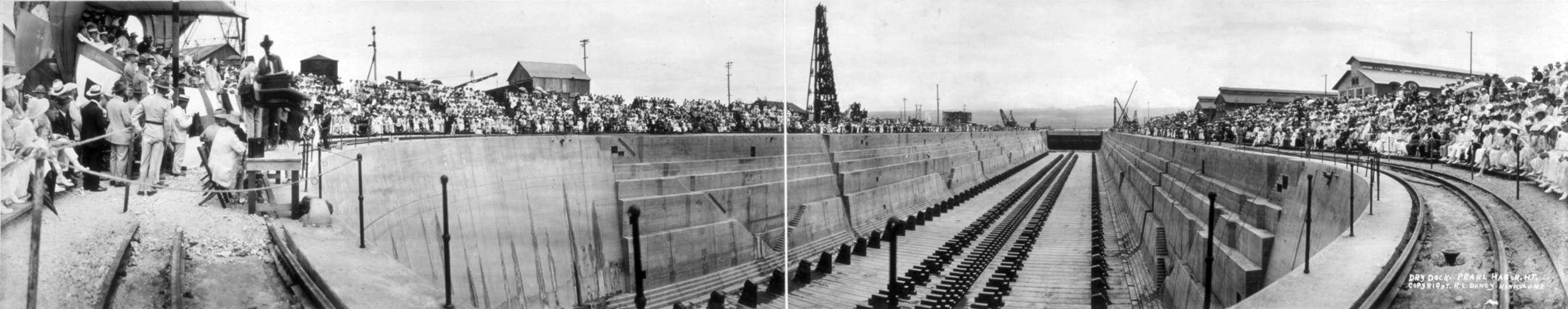
Opening of Dry Dock No.1 in 1919.

Despite the warnings of the Bureau of Equipment, the War Department, the Department of Labor and Commerce, and the Department of Agriculture had secured permission to settle on the naval reservation. By 1906, the Commandant believed that it was necessary for the Bureau of Yards and Docks to develop a policy on the future of the station. The docks were being used to a greater extent by the Army transports than by Navy ships, and the Army was actually attempting to get possession of Quarantine Wharf (which was built by the Territorial Government on the Naval Reservation, with the understanding that it could be taken over at any time by the Navy Department upon the payment of its appraised value). In 1903, the Department of Labor and Commerce received about 7 acres (2.8 ha) for an Immigration Station. The Department of Agriculture had, in the meanwhile, secured part of the site intended for a hospital as an experimental station. The Commandant felt that, if the station was going to develop beyond a mere coaling depot, these territorial encroachments on the part of other departments should be stopped, particularly when they were enjoying the benefits of naval appropriations. "On the other hand," he wrote, "if it is the intention to improve Pearl Harbor and eventually abandon this station every effort should be made to begin work there as soon as possible... I am informed that important commercial interests will make a strong effort next year to have Pearl Harbor improved, and I think that will be an opportune time for the Navy Department to make efforts in the same direction."

In 1908, the Pearl Harbor Naval Shipyard was established. The period from 1908 to 1919 was one of steady and continuous growth of the Naval Station, Pearl Harbor, with the exception of the discouraging collapse of the drydock in 1913. The Act of 13 May 1908 authorized the enlargement and dredging of the Pearl Harbor channel and lochs "to admit the largest ships," the building of shops and supply houses for the Navy Yard, and the construction of a drydock. Work on the dock started on 21 September 1909. In April 1910, the barquentine Amaranth became the fourth deep-sea, cargo-carrying vessel to venture into the newly dredged harbor, having been preceded by the three-masted schooner W.H. Marston on 8 March, and the schooner Ariel and bark Marston a few days later. Amaranth delivered materials for construction of the dry dock facility. Work progressed satisfactorily on all projects, except the drydock. After much wrangling with Congress to secure an appropriation of over three million dollars for its construction, the drydock was wrecked by "underground pressure". "On February 17, 1913, the entire drydock structure rumbled, rocked, and caved in." The drydock was ceremonially opened to flooding on 21 August 1919, by Mrs. Josephus Daniels, wife of the Secretary of the Navy. In 1917, Ford Island in the middle of Pearl Harbor was purchased for joint Army and Navy use in the development of military aviation in the Pacific.

As the Imperial Japanese military pressed its war in China, concern over Japan's intentions caused the U.S. to begin taking defensive measures. On 1 February 1933, the U.S. Navy staged a mock attack on the base at Pearl Harbor as part of a preparedness exercise. The attack "succeeded" and the defense was deemed a "failure".

=== 7 December 1941 ===
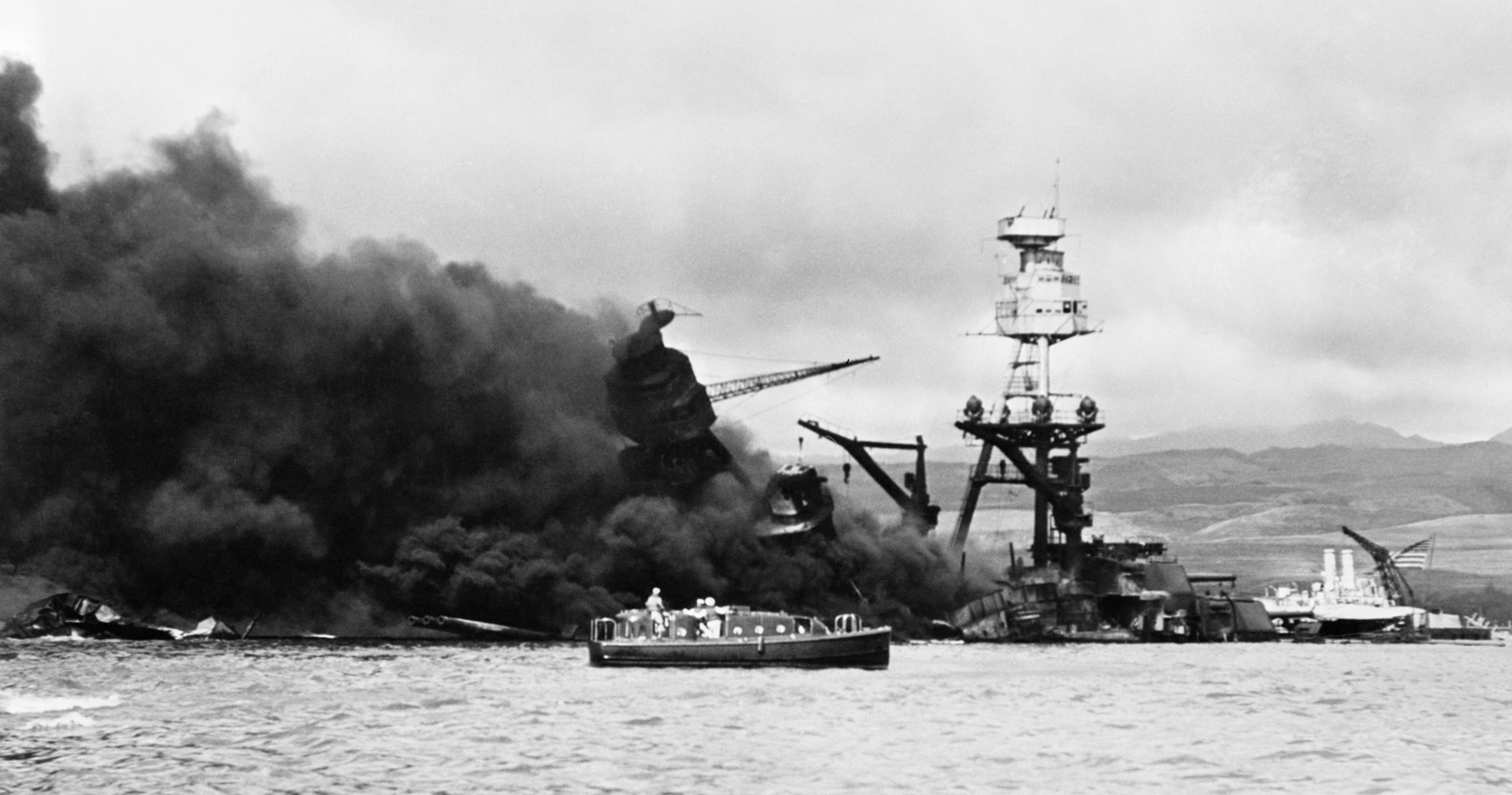
USS Arizona (BB-39) sinking during the attack.

The attack on Pearl Harbor by the Empire of Japan on 7 December 1941 brought the United States into World War II.

Aircraft and midget submarines of the Imperial Japanese Navy under the command of Admiral Chuichi Nagumo began bombing Honolulu at the U.S. naval base. Through earlier code breaking activity, the Americans had determined that an attack was likely to occur. However, as the Americans failed to discover Japan's target location, it was believed that the Philippines was the most likely target. At 06:05 on 7 December, the six Japanese carriers launched a first wave of 183 aircraft composed mainly of dive bombers, horizontal bombers and fighters.

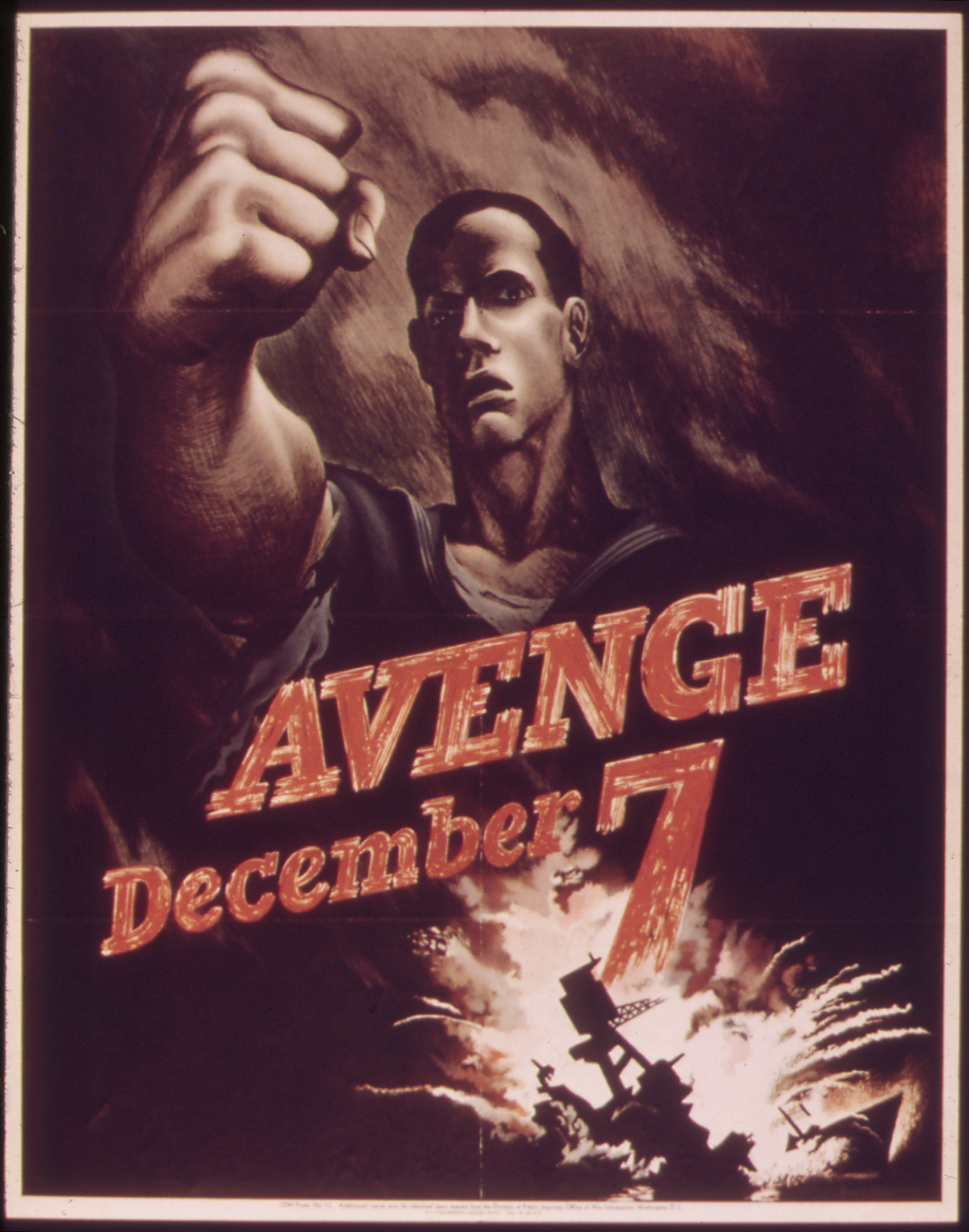
Propaganda poster

The Japanese struck American ships and military installations at 07:51. The first wave attacked airfields of Ford Island. At 08:30, a second wave of 170 Japanese aircraft, mostly torpedo bombers, attacked the fleet anchored in Pearl Harbor. The battleship Arizona was hit with an armor-piercing bomb which penetrated the forward ammunition compartment, sinking it within seconds, killing 1,177 crew members.

The overall death toll was 2,467 people: 2,403 American citizens—2,335 members of the U.S. military and 68 civilians—and 64 members of the Imperial Japanese Navy. Five U.S. battleships were sunk and the other remaining three were badly damaged. Overall, nine ships of the U.S. fleet were sunk and 21 ships were severely damaged. Three of the 21 would be irreparable. 188 U.S. aircraft were completely destroyed and 159 others were damaged. Japan lost 29 out of the 353 aircraft they attacked with. The attack on Pearl Harbor was the largest attack committed by foreign nationals on American soil in peacetime and in general prior to the September 11 attacks.

The first shots fired were from the destroyer Ward on a midget submarine that surfaced outside of Pearl Harbor; Ward sank the midget sub at approximately 06:55, about an hour before the attack on Pearl Harbor.

=== West Loch Explosion, 1944 ===
Just after 3 p.m. on Sunday 21 May 1944 an explosion in a staging area for Landing Ships, Tank (LSTs) and other amphibious assault ships in West Loch leading to a fire which quickly spread among the ships being prepared for Operation Forager, the invasion of the Japanese-held Mariana Islands. Over the next 24 hours, six LSTs sank, 163 naval personnel died and 396 were injured.

A subsequent Naval Board of Inquiry never determined the exact cause of the disaster. But it concluded the initial explosion was caused when a mortar round aboard LST-353 detonated during an unloading operation because it was either dropped or went off when gasoline vapours ignited. The incident – together with the Port Chicago disaster two months later – led to major changes in weapon handling practices within the United States Navy.

== Post-World War II years ==
Over the years, Pearl Harbor remained a main base for the US Pacific Fleet after World War II along with Naval Base San Diego. In 2010, the Navy and the Air Force merged their two nearby bases; Pearl Harbor joined with Hickam Air Force Base to create Joint Base Pearl Harbor–Hickam.

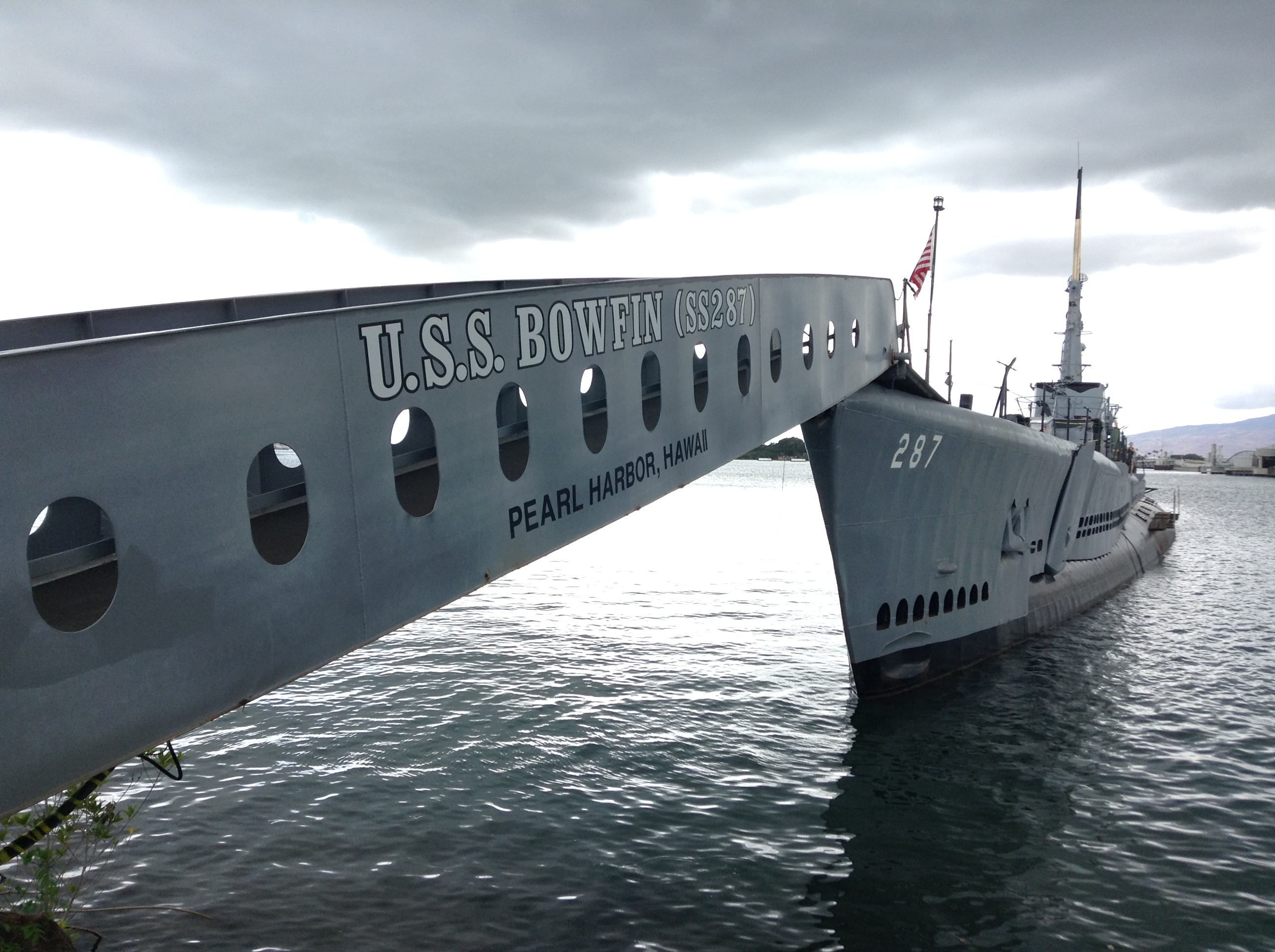
The USS Bowfin is now a museum at Pearl Harbor.

On 29 January 1964, the Navy base itself was recognized as a National Historic Landmark district and with the National Register of Historic Places since 1976. Within its bounds, it contains several other National Historic Landmarks associated with the attack on Pearl Harbor, including the Arizona, Bowfin, and Utah. As an active Navy base, many of the historic buildings that contributed to the NHL designation are under threat of demolition and rebuilding.

From 1932 to 1983, the most recognizable structure on the submarine base was the 100-foot-tall Escape Training Tank. A similar tower on Ford Island was converted to an airport control tower during World War II and still stands. Generations of submariners learned to escape in up to 80 feet of water using buoyant ascent and were trained in the use of the Momsen lung or Steinke hood. The Steinke hood was replaced by the Submarine Escape Immersion Equipment in the 2000s.

Bloch Arena located on the base is still in use today and hosted the collegiate Pearl Harbor Basketball Invitational and was home to the Honolulu Chiefs of the American Basketball League. The address is 224 A Avenue, Honolulu, HI 96818.

On 4 December 2019, while the nuclear submarine USS Columbia was in dry dock at Pearl Harbor, 22 year-old Machinist Mate Auxiliary Fireman Gabriel Romero shot and killed two naval station civilian employees and injured another before shooting and killing himself. Romero was one of Columbia's crew and been assigned to the armed Topside Roving Patrol aboard the vessel; both weapons involved in the shooting were issued from the Columbia. Later investigation by the Navy determined that Romero was "likely unfit" for service on a submarine and that officers aboard the Columbia had failed to recognize signs of Romero's degrading mental state.

== Environmental contamination ==
On October 14, 1992, the US EPA added the Pearl Harbor Naval Complex to the National Priorities List, a list of sites deemed to require investigation and remediation by the federal level Superfund. It is the only such site in Hawaii.

In November 2021, 20,000 gallons of jet fuel spilled from Red Hill Bulk Fuel Storage Facility, which had 20 tanks, each holding 12.5 million gallons, buried under volcanic rock to protect them from attacks. 5,000 gallons of fuel spilled into the navy's water system. People using the water system were assured the water was safe to drink, until they started noticing it tasted strange. On December 10, Hawaii health officials reported "high levels" of petroleum and gasoline in a sample of water from the Red Hill well fed by an aquifer under a, which had a problem with leaks. Shortly after a November 2021 report of a leak, the US Navy stopped using the fuel storage farm. 93,000 people could not use the navy's water system, and the military was giving water to those who needed it, while some people had to be moved to hotels for several months. It took three months for the water to be found safe, and in 2022 the Secretary of Defense ordered Red Hill to be closed, and the fuel was removed over a period of six months. Further cleanup of the aquifer was taking place, and while the navy said the water was safe, some people had their doubts. In 2024, 2000 families sued the navy.

== Vessels ==
=== Surface ships presently homeported ===
As of June 2025

Ticonderoga-class cruisers (1)

- USS Shiloh (CG-67)

Arleigh Burke-class destroyers (8)

- USS Hopper (DDG-70)
- USS Decatur (DDG-73)
- USS Wayne E. Meyer (DDG-108)
- USS William P. Lawrence (DDG-110)
- USS Michael Murphy (DDG-112)
- USS Daniel Inouye (DDG-118)
- USS Carl M. Levin (DDG-120)
- USS Frank E. Petersen, Jr. (DDG-121)

=== Submarines presently homeported ===
As of November 2023

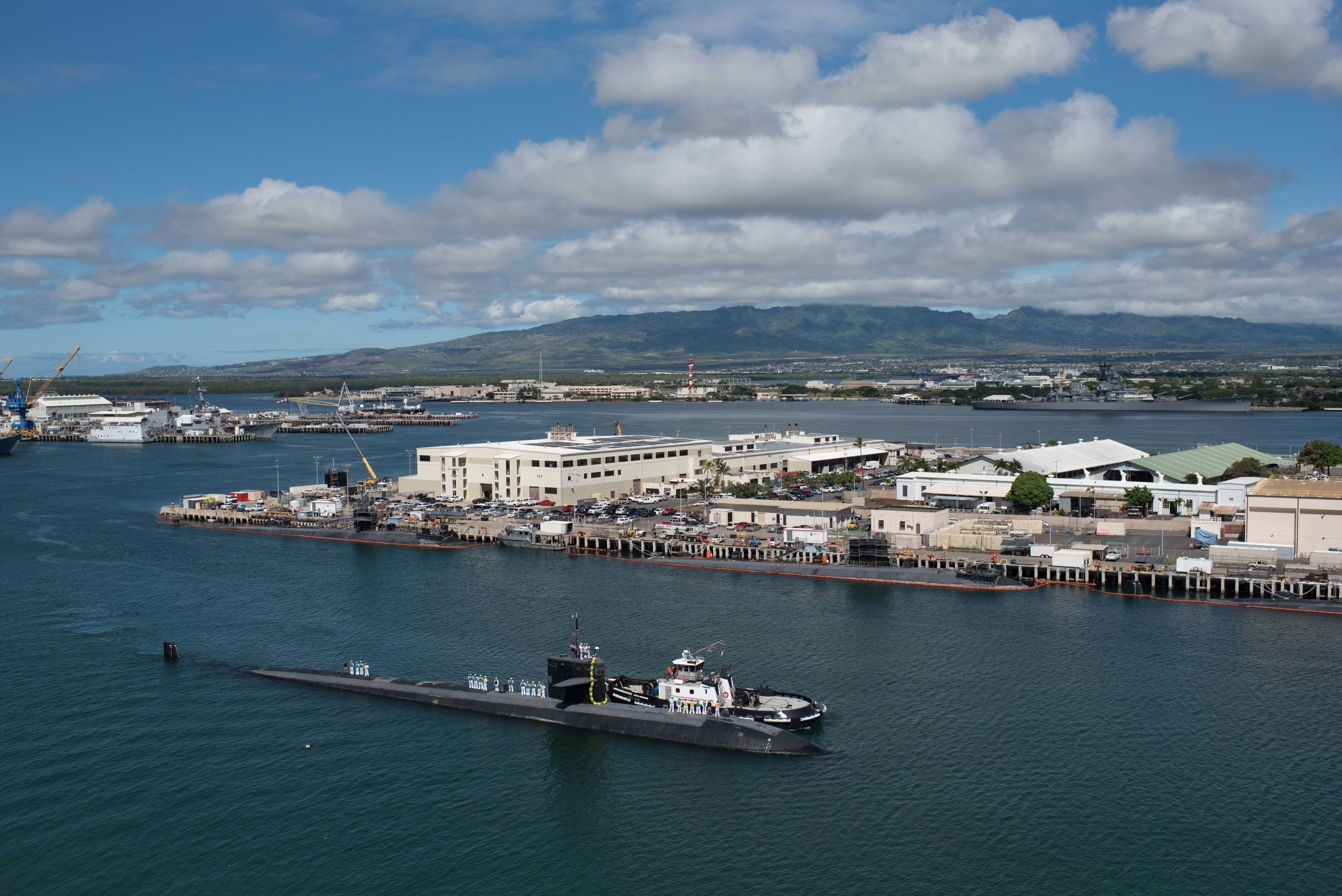
USS Bremerton, USS Louisville and USS Cheyenne at the submarine base, in April 2018.

Los Angeles-class submarines (11)

- USS Columbus (SSN-762)
- USS Charlotte (SSN-766)
- USS Tucson (SSN-770)
- USS Columbia (SSN-771)

Virginia-class submarines (6)

- USS Hawaii (SSN-776)
- USS North Carolina (SSN-777)
- USS Missouri (SSN-780)
- USS Mississippi (SSN-782)
- USS Illinois (SSN-786)
- USS Colorado (SSN-788)
- USS Indiana (SSN-789)
- USS Vermont (SSN-792)
- USS Montana (SSN-794)

As part of the 2006 Quadrennial Defense Review, the Navy announced in early 2006 that it would shift 60% of its attack submarines to the Pacific by 2010.

=== USS Missouri ===
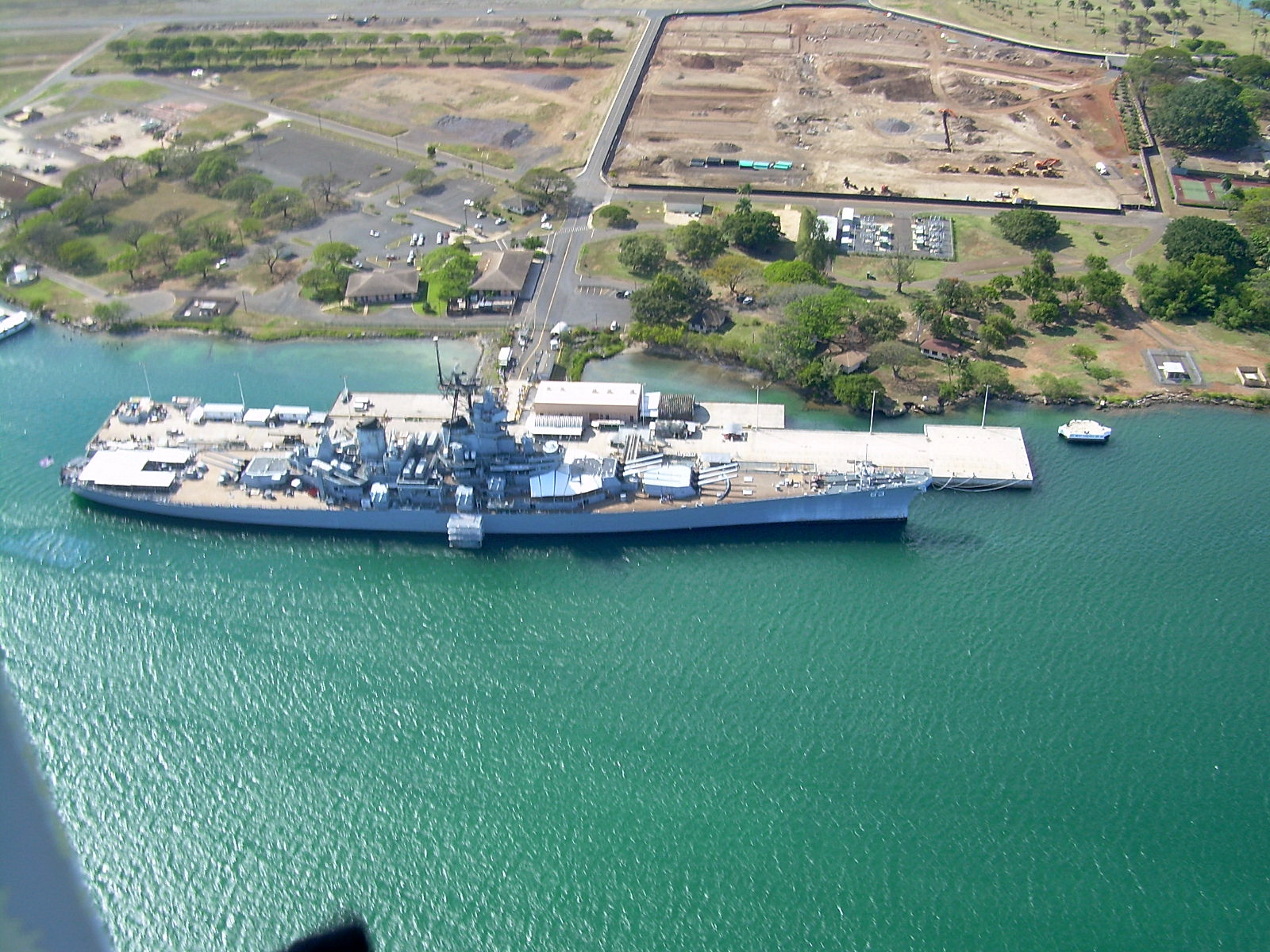
USS Missouri (BB-63), now a museum ship, docked at Ford Island, Pearl Harbor

USS Missouri (BB-63) ("Mighty Mo" or "Big Mo") is a United States Navy Iowa-class battleship, and was the fourth ship of the U.S. Navy to be named in honor of the U.S. state of Missouri. Missouri was the last battleship built by the United States, and was the site of the surrender of the Empire of Japan which ended World War II.

Missouri was ordered in 1940 and commissioned in June 1944. In the Pacific Theater of World War II she fought in the battles of Iwo Jima and Okinawa and shelled the Japanese home islands, and she fought in the Korean War from 1950 to 1953. She was decommissioned in 1955 into the United States Navy reserve fleets (the "Mothball Fleet"), but reactivated and modernized in 1984 as part of the 600-ship Navy plan, and provided fire support during Operation Desert Storm in January/February 1991.

Missouri received a total of 11 battle stars for service in World War II, Korea, and the Persian Gulf, and was finally decommissioned on 31 March 1992, but remained on the Naval Vessel Register until her name was struck in January 1995. In 1998, she was donated to the USS Missouri Memorial Association and became a museum ship at Pearl Harbor, Hawaii.

== See also ==
- United States Navy submarine bases
- World War II United States Merchant Navy
- Naval Base Hawaii
- Naval Submarine Base Pearl Harbor
- Naval Inactive Ship Maintenance Facility#Pearl_Harbor,_Hawaii
