= Joint Base Pearl Harbor–Hickam =

US military joint service installation in Oahu, Hawaii, US

- Oahu, Hawaii in the United States of America
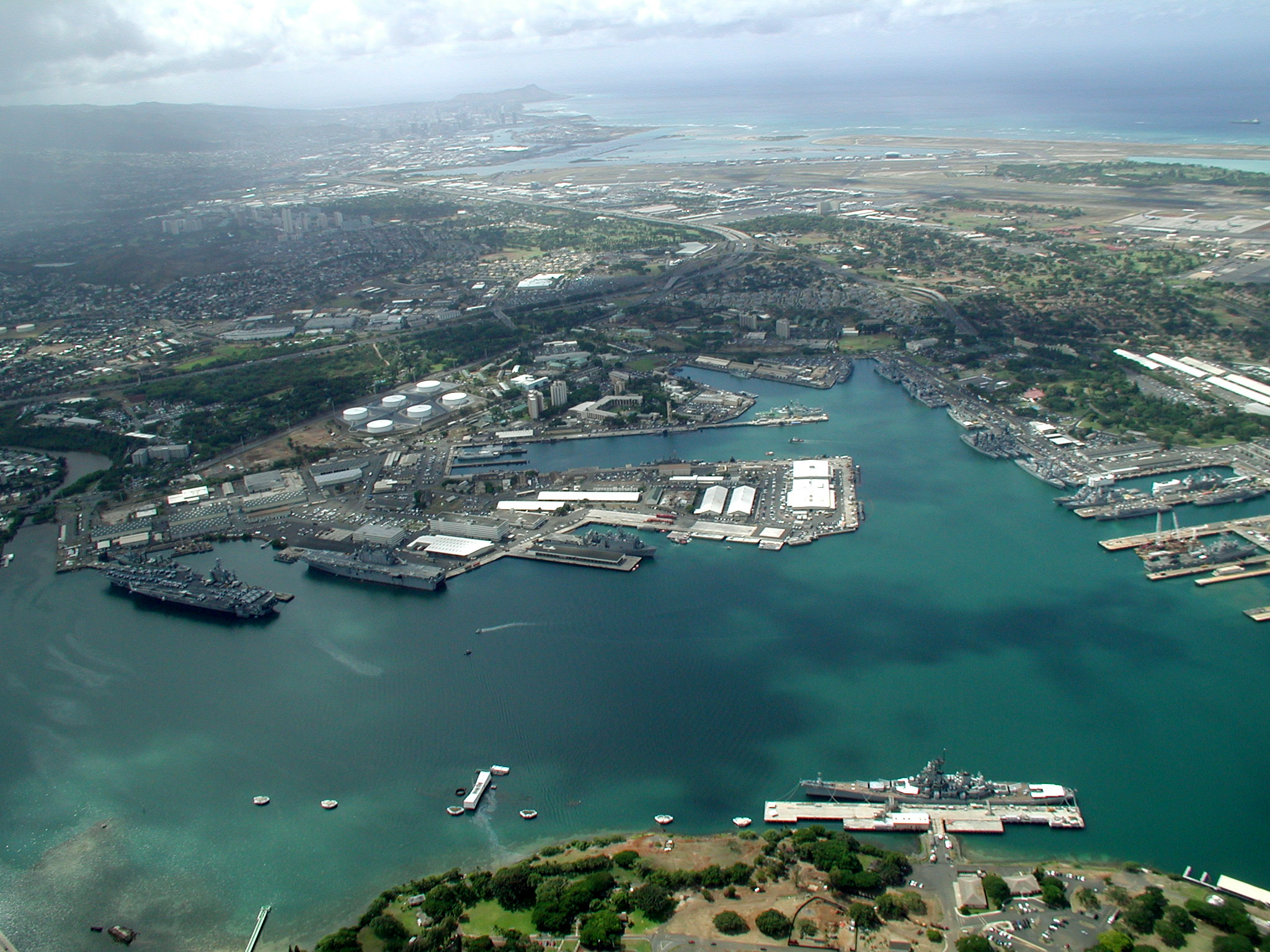
- An aerial view of ships moored at JB Pearl Harbor-Hickam during Rim of the Pacific (RIMPAC) Exercise 2004.

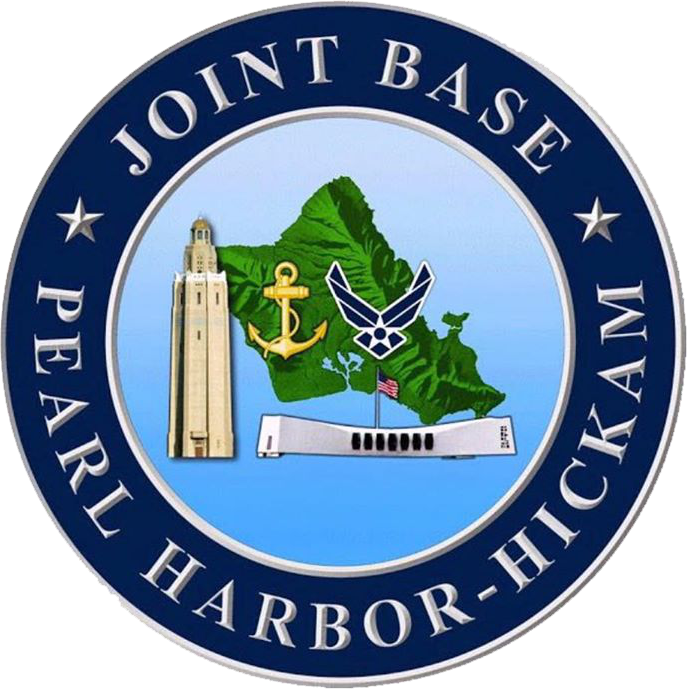

Site information
- Type: US military Joint Base
- Owner: Department of Defense
- Operator: US Navy
- Controlled by: Navy Region Hawaii
- Condition: Operational
- Website: Official website

Location
- Location on Oʻahu, Hawaiʻi JB Pearl Harbor-Hickam (Hawaii) JB Pearl Harbor-Hickam (Pacific Ocean)
- Coordinates: 21°20′57″N 157°56′38″W

Site history
- Built: 1899 (Pearl Harbor); 1938 (Hickam Field)
- In use: 2010 – present (as Joint Base)

Garrison information
- Current commander: Captain Mark Sohaney
- Garrison: Navy Region Hawaii (Host); 647th Air Base Group

Airfield information
- Identifiers: IATA: HNL, ICAO: PHNL, FAA LID: HNL
- Elevation: 3.9 metres (13 ft) AMSL
Runways
Direction	Length and surface
8L/26R	3,752.6 metres (12,312 ft) Asphalt
8R/26L	3,657.6 metres (12,000 ft) Asphalt
4R/22L	2,743.2 metres (9,000 ft) Asphalt
4L/22R	2,118.9 metres (6,952 ft) Asphalt
8W/26W	1,524 metres (5,000 ft) Water
4W/22W	914.4 metres (3,000 ft) Water
- Airfield shared with Daniel K. Inouye International Airport; Source: Federal Aviation Administration

Joint Base Pearl Harbor–Hickam (JBPHH) (IATA: HNL, ICAO: PHNL, FAA LID: HNL) is a United States military base on the island of Oahu, Hawaii. It is an amalgamation of the United States Air Force's Hickam Air Force Base and the United States Navy's Naval Station Pearl Harbor, which were merged in 2010.

Joint Base Pearl Harbor–Hickam is one of twelve Joint Bases the 2005 Base Realignment and Closure Commission created.

It is part of Navy Region Hawaii and provides Navy and joint operations Base Operating Support that is capabilities-based and integrated.

== Naval Station Pearl Harbor ==
Pearl Harbor is 8 miles (13 km) from Honolulu. Naval Station Pearl Harbor provides berthing and shore side support to surface ships and submarines, as well as maintenance and training. Pearl Harbor can accommodate the largest ships in the fleet, to include dry dock services, and is now home to over 160 commands. Housing, personnel, and family support are also provided and are an integral part of the shore side activities, which encompasses both permanent and transient personnel.

Because Pearl Harbor is the only intermediate maintenance facility for submarines in the Middle Pacific, it serves as host to a large number of visiting submariners.

The Naval Computer and Telecommunications Area Master Station Pacific, Wahiawa, Hawaii is the world's largest communication station. The headquarters site of this shore command is located in the central section of the island of Oahu, approximately three miles north of Wahiawa.

== Hickam Air Force Base ==
Hickam Air Force Base was named in honor of aviation pioneer Lt. Col. Horace Meek Hickam. It is under the jurisdiction of Pacific Air Forces (PACAF), which is headquartered on the base.

Hickam AFB remains the launch point of strategic air mobility and operational missions in support of the Global War on Terrorism as well as special air missions in support of the Commander, U.S. Pacific Command (USPACOM) and Commander, Pacific Air Forces (PACAF).

In 2009, the base was used as the temporary operating location for Air Force One during Barack Obama's Christmas vacation at Kailua, Hawaii.

== Infrastructure ==
Wells access groundwater sources that provide water to the base system, which serves residents of military housing, the Aliamanu Military Reservation, and several elementary schools and day care centers.

== Based Units ==
=== United States Navy ===
Commander, Navy Installations Command (CNIC)

- Commander, Navy Region Hawaii (NAVREGHI) (Host Unit)

United States Pacific Fleet (USPACFLT)

- Commander, US Pacific Fleet (COMUSPACFLT)
  - Commander, Submarine Force, U.S. Pacific Fleet (COMSUBPAC)
    - Commander, Submarine Squadron One (COMSUBRON 1)
      - USS Hawaii (SSN-776)
      - USS North Carolina (SSN-777)
      - USS Missouri (SSN-780)
      - USS Mississippi (SSN-782)
      - USS Illinois (SSN-786)
      - USS Vermont (SSN-792)
      - USS Montana (SSN-794)
    - Commander, Submarine Squadron Seven (COMSUBRON 7)
      - USS Charlotte (SSN-766)
      - USS Tucson (SSN-770)
      - USS Columbia (SSN-771)
      - USS Missouri (SSN-780)
      - USS Colorado (SSN-788)
      - USS Indiana (SSN-789)
- Commander, Naval Surface Force Pacific (COMNAVSURFPAC)
  - Commander, Surface Group Middle Pacific (COMNAVSURFGRUMIDPAC) (GSU)
    - USS Shiloh (CG-67)
    - Commander, Destroyer Squadron 31 (COMDESRON 31)
      - USS Hopper (DDG-70)
      - USS Decatur (DDG-73)
      - USS Wayne E. Meyer (DDG-108)
      - USS William P. Lawrence (DDG-110)
      - USS Michael Murphy (DDG-112)
      - USS Daniel Inouye (DDG-118)
      - USS Carl M. Levin (DDG-120)
      - USS Frank E. Petersen Jr. (DDG-121)
  - Afloat Training Group Middle Pacific (AFLOATRAGRUMIDPAC) (GSU)

Naval Facilities Engineering Systems Command (NAVFAC)

- Naval Facilities Engineering Systems Command Pacific (NAVFAC Pacific) (GSU)
  - Naval Facilities Engineering Systems Command Hawaii (NAVFACHI)

Naval Information Forces (NAVIFOR)

- Naval Computer and Telecommunications Area Master Station Pacific (NCTAMS PAC) (GSU)
- Naval Information Operations Command Hawaii (NIOC HI)(GSU)
  - Commander, Task Force 1070 (CTF-1070)

Naval Sea Systems Command (NAVSEA)

- Pearl Harbor Naval Shipyard (PHNSY & IMF)
- Mobile Diving and Salvage Unit One (MDSU 1)

Naval Supply Systems Command (NAVSUP)

- Naval Supply Fleet Logistics Center Pearl Harbor (GSU)

Bureau of Medicine and Surgery (BUMED)

- Navy Medicine Readiness and Training Command - Pearl Harbor (NMRTC) (GSU)
  - Naval Health Clinic Hawaii (NHCH)

Naval Education and Training Command (NETC)

- Surface Warfare Schools Command (SWSC)
  - SWSC Learning Site Pearl Harbor

United States Navy Reserve (USNR)

- Navy Reserve Center - Pearl Harbor

=== United States Air Force ===
Pacific Air Forces (PACAF)

- Headquarters Pacific Air Forces
  - Pacific Air Forces Cyberspace Systems Squadron
  - 613th Air Operations Center
- Eleventh Air Force
  - 15th Wing
    - 15th Wing Staff Agencies
    - 15th Comptroller Squadron
    - 15th Operations Group
      - 535th Airlift Squadron - Boeing C-17A Globemaster III
      - 65th Airlift Squadron - Gulfstream Aerospace C-37B Gulfstream G550
      - 19th Fighter Squadron - Lockheed Martin F-22A Raptor
      - 15th Operations Support Squadron
    - 15th Maintenance Group
      - 15th Maintenance Squadron
      - 15th Aircraft Maintenance Squadron
    - 647th Air Base Group
      - 647th Civil Engineer Squadron
      - 647th Force Support Squadron
      - 647th Logistics Readiness Squadron
      - 647th Security Forces Squadron
      - 747th Cyberspace Squadron
    - 15th Medical Group
      - 15th Healthcare Operations Squadron
      - 15th Medical Support Squadron
      - 15th Operational Medical Readiness Squadron

Air Combat Command (ACC)

- Sixteenth Air Force
  - 688th Cyberspace Wing
    - 690th Cyberspace Operations Group
      - 690th Cyberspace Operations Squadron (GSU)
  - 67th Cyberspace Wing
    - 67th Cyberspace Operations Group
      - 352nd Cyberspace Operations Squadron (GSU)
  - 480th Intelligence, Surveillance and Reconnaissance Wing
    - 692nd Intelligence, Surveillance and Reconnaissance Group (GSU)
      - 8th Intelligence Squadron
      - 324th Intelligence Squadron
      - 392nd Intelligence Squadron
      - 792nd Intelligence Support Squadron
  - 557th Weather Wing
    - 1st Weather Group
      - 17th Operational Weather Squadron (GSU)
  - 70th Intelligence, Surveillance and Reconnaissance Wing
    - 543rd Intelligence, Surveillance and Reconnaissance Group
      - 37th Intelligence Squadron (GSU)

Air Mobility Command (AMC)

- United States Air Force Expeditionary Center
  - 515th Air Mobility Operations Wing (GSU)
    - Headquarters, 515th Air Mobility Operations Wing
      - 735th Air Mobility Squadron

Air Force Materiel Command (AFMC)

- Air Force Installation and Mission Support Center
  - Detachment 2 (GSU)
  - Air Force Installation Contracting Center
    - Operating Location PACAF (GSU)
      - 766th Enterprise Sourcing Squadron
  - Air Force Security Forces Center
    - Detachment 2
      - Operating Location Alpha (GSU)

Air Force Reserve Command (AFRC)

- Fourth Air Force
  - 624th Regional Support Group (GSU)
    - 624th Civil Engineer Squadron
    - 48th Aerial Port Squadron
    - 624th Aeromedical Staging Squadron
    - 624th Force Support Flight

Air National Guard (ANG)

- Hawaii Air National Guard
  - 154th Wing
    - 154th Wing Staff Agencies
    - 154th Comptroller Flight
    - 154th Operations Group
      - 199th Fighter Squadron - Lockheed Martin F-22A Raptor
      - 203rd Air Refueling Squadron - Boeing KC-135R Stratotanker
      - 204th Airlift Squadron - Boeing C-17A Globemaster III
      - 201st Intelligence Squadron
      - 154th Operations Support Squadron
    - 154th Maintenance Group
      - 154th Maintenance Squadron
      - 154th Aircraft Maintenance Squadron
      - 154th Maintenance Operations Flight
    - 154th Mission Support Group
      - 154th Security Forces Squadron
      - 154th Communications Squadron
      - 154th Force Support Squadron
      - 154th Logistics Readiness Squadron
    - 154th Medical Group
    - 201st Air Operations Group
      - 201st Combat Operations Squadron
      - 201st Air Mobility Operations Squadron

Civil Air Patrol

- Pacific Region
  - Hawaii Wing
    - Hickam Composite Squadron (PCR-HI-066) (GSU)

=== United States Space Force ===
- United States Space Forces Indo-Pacific (SPACEFORINDOPAC)
  - Headquarters U.S. Space Forces Indo-Pacific

=== United States Army ===
94th Army Air and Missile Defense Command (94th AAMDC)

- Headquarters Battery

8th Theater Sustainment Command (8th TSC)

- 8th Special Troops Battalion - USAV CW3 Harold C. Clinger (LSV-2) & USAV General Brehon B. Somervell (LSV-3)
  - 545th Transportation Company
    - 545th Harbormaster Detachment (GSU) - USAV Lt. General William B. Bunker (LSV-4)
- 130th Engineer Brigade
  - 65th Engineer Battalion
    - 7th Engineer Dive Detachment (GSU)

Regional Health Command-Pacific

  - Public Health Command-Pacific
    - Public Health Activity - Hawaii
      - Joint Base Pearl Harbor–Hickam Veterinary Treatment Facility (GSU)

United States Army Reserve

- 657th Area Support Group
  - 548th Transportation Detachment (GSU) USAV SSGT Robert T. Kuroda (LSV-7)
- US Army Reserve Element, Defense Logistics Agency Pacific Center

=== US Department of Defense ===
US Indo-Pacific Command (USINDOPACOM)

- Joint Intelligence Operations Center Pacific
- Center for Excellence in Disaster Management and Humanitarian Assistance
- K. Mark Takai Warfighting Center

Defense Logistics Agency (DLA)

- Defense Logistics Agency - Indo-Pacific
  - Distribution Center - Pearl Harbor
  - Disposition Services - Joint Base Pearl Harbor–Hickam

Defense Information Systems Agency (DISA)

- Defense Information Systems Agency - Pacific Field Office (DISA-PAC)

Defense POW/MIA Accounting Agency (DPAA)

- Defense POW/MIA Accounting Agency - Indo-Pacific
  - Sub Regional Team One
  - Sub Regional Team Two
  - Operations & Accounting Support Division
- Defense POW/MIA Accounting Agency - Expeditionary Support
  - Alpha Section
  - Bravo Section
  - Charlie Section
  - Delta Section
  - World-wide Operations Center
  - DPAA Academy

=== United States Coast Guard ===
- Coast Guard Pacific Area
  - Coast Guard Oceania District
    - USCGC Harriet Lane (WMEC-903)

=== National Oceanic and Atmospheric Administration ===
- Office of Marine and Avionics Operations
  - Marine Operations Center - Pacific Islands (GSU)
    - NOAAS Oscar Elton Sette (R 335)

== In popular culture ==
JBPHH is the main location on the CBS television series NCIS: Hawaiʻi.

== Gallery ==
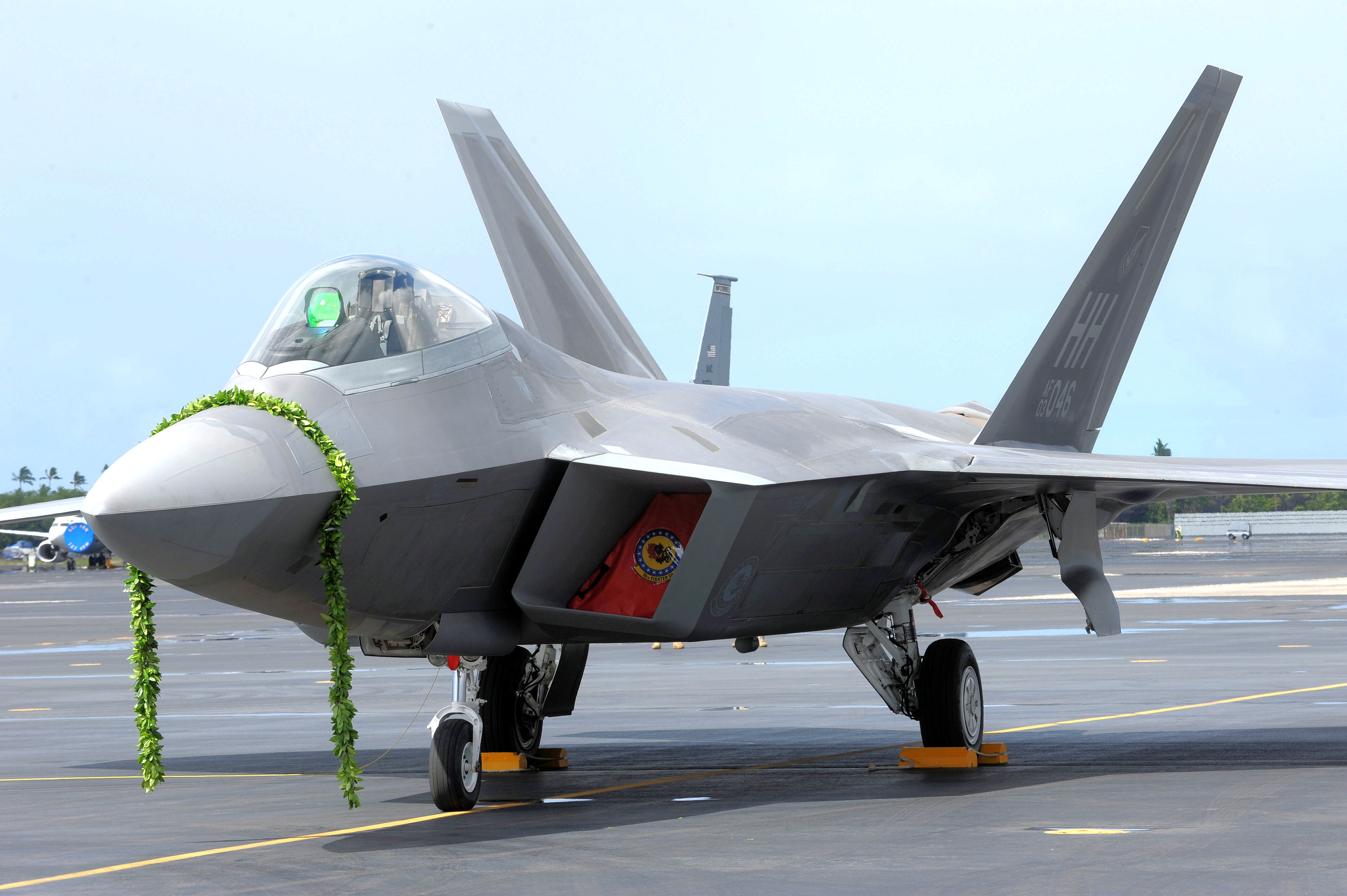
F-22A Raptor of the Hawaii Air National Guard.

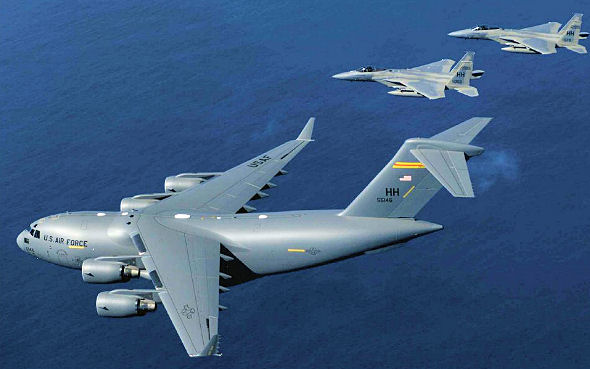
C-17 Globemaster III and F-15 Eagles of the Hawaii Air National Guard, 2008

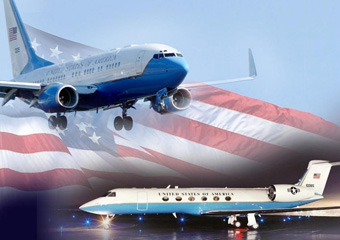
65th Airlift Squadron Special Air Mission DV aircraft

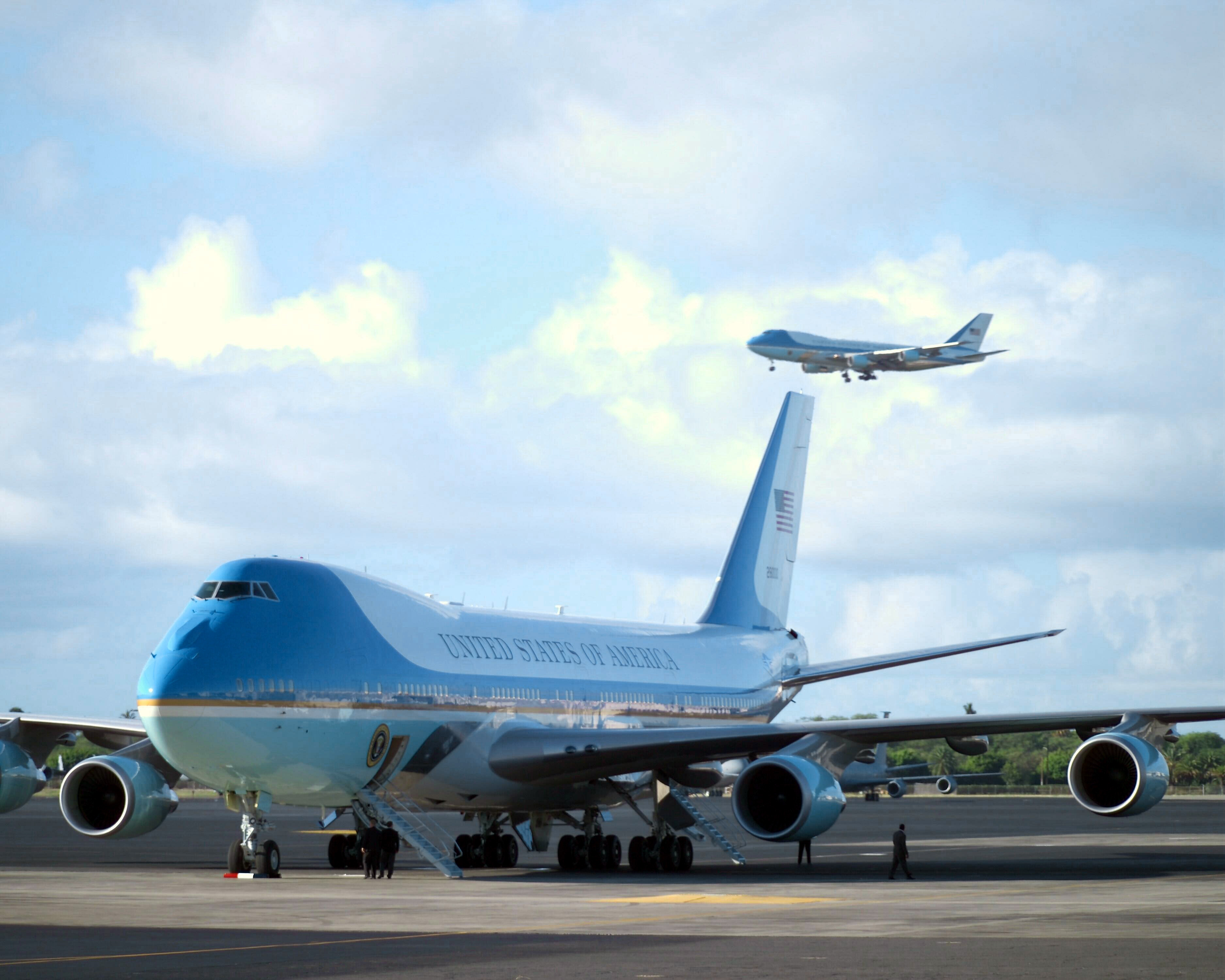
Air Force One (in air) and its backup on the ground during a 2003 visit by George W. Bush

== See also ==
- Pearl Harbor attack
- Red Hill water crisis
- HABS/HAER documentation of Pearl Harbor Naval Base for a listing of the very extensive documentation of Pearl Harbor Naval Base by the Historic American Buildings Survey and the Historic American Engineering Record
- HABS/HAER documentation of Hickam Air Force Base for a listing of the documentation of Hickam Air Force Base by the Historic American Buildings Survey
