= USS North Carolina (SSN-777) =

US Navy Virginia-class submarine

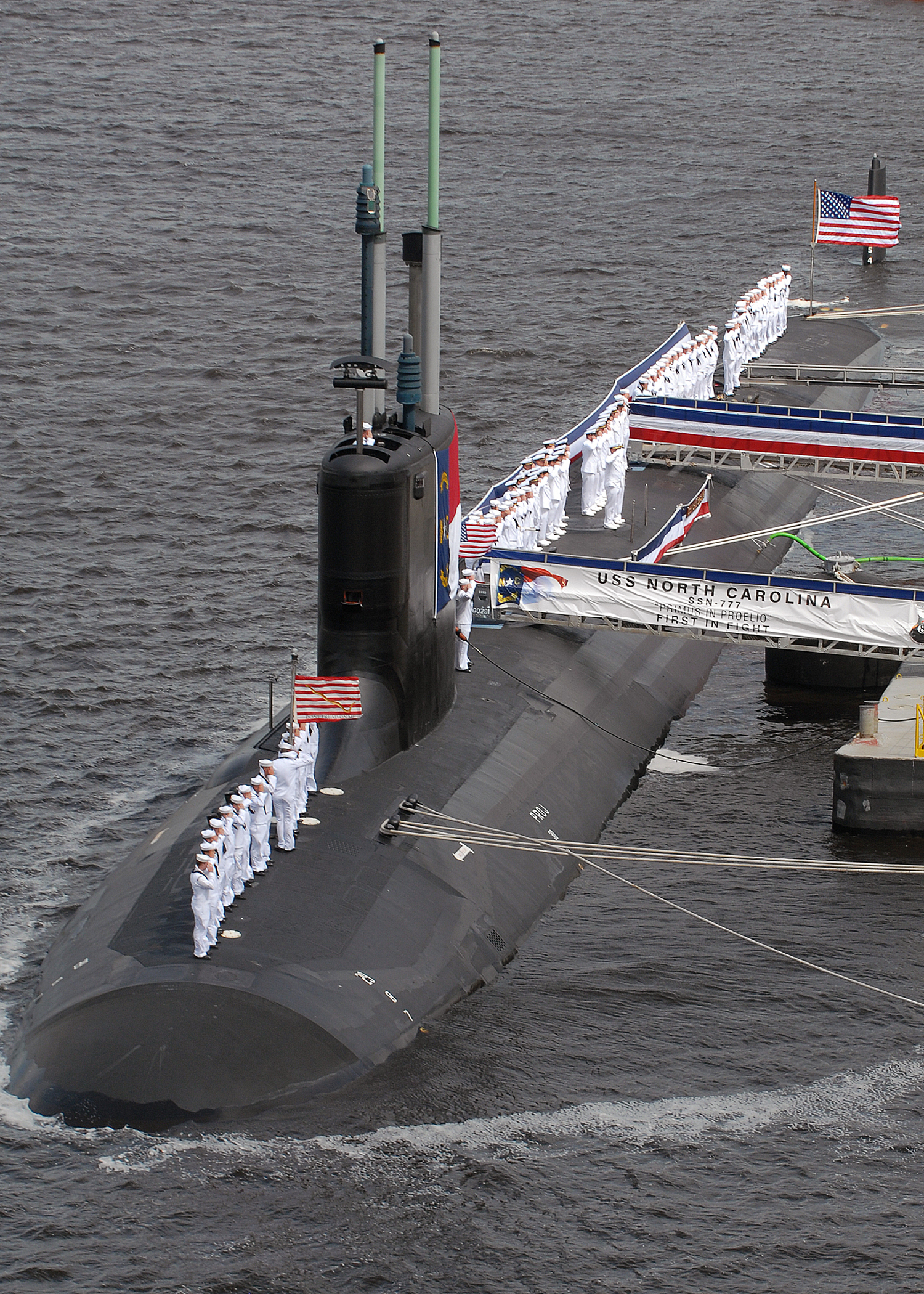
- USS North Carolina (SSN-777) during her commissioning ceremony in 2008.

History

United States
- Name: North Carolina
- Namesake: State of North Carolina
- Ordered: 30 September 1998
- Builder: Northrop Grumman Newport News
- Laid down: 22 May 2004
- Launched: 5 May 2007
- Christened: 21 April 2007
- Acquired: 21 February 2008
- Commissioned: 3 May 2008
- Home port: Pearl Harbor, Hawaii
- Motto: Primus in Proelio ("First in Fight")
- Nickname(s): The Lucky Girl
- Status: in active service
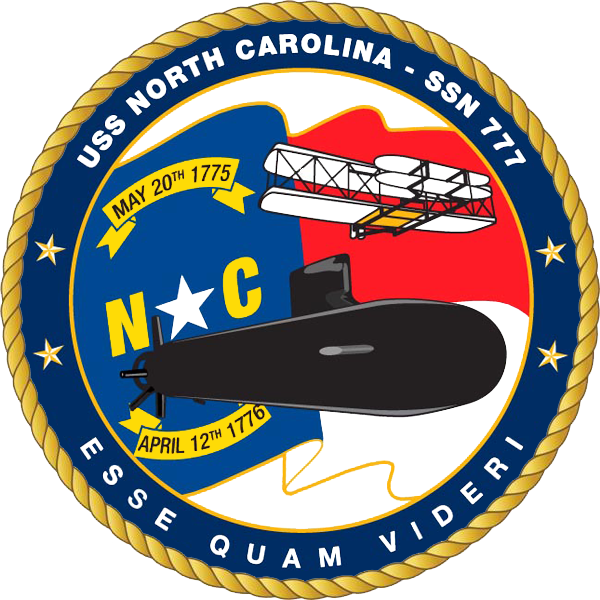
- Badge

General characteristics
- Class & type: Virginia-class submarine
- Displacement: 7,800 tons
- Length: 114.9 m (377 ft)
- Beam: 10.3 m (34 ft)
- Depth: 800 ft (244 m)
- Propulsion: 1 × S9G PWR nuclear reactor 280,000 shp (210 MW), HEU 93%; 2 × steam turbines 40,000 shp (30 MW); 1 × single shaft pump-jet propulsor; 1 × secondary propulsion motor
- Speed: 25 knots (46 km/h)+
- Range: Essentially unlimited distance; 33 years
- Complement: 134 (14 officers, 120 enlisted)
- Armament: 12 × VLS (BGM-109 Tomahawk cruise missile); 4 × 533 mm torpedo tubes for up to 30 torpedoes (Mark 48 torpedo)

USS North Carolina (SSN-777), a Virginia-class attack submarine, is the fourth vessel of the United States Navy named for U.S. state of North Carolina. The contract to build her was awarded to Northrop Grumman Newport News on 30 September 1998 and her keel was laid down on 24 May 2004. She was launched on 5 May 2007. North Carolina was commissioned on 3 May 2008 in Wilmington, North Carolina.

This class of submarine is unique in that it features the Photonics Mast Program (PMP) that freed ship designers to place the boat's control room in a lower, less geometrically constrained space than would be required by a standard, optical tube periscope. It is additionally unique in the U.S. Navy for featuring all-digital ship and ballast control systems that are operated by relatively senior watchstanders and a pressure chamber to deploy SEAL divers while being submerged. She is capable of diverse missions, including conventional submarine warfare, strike warfare, mining operations, and delivery of special operations personnel and equipment.

== History ==
The contract to build her was awarded to Northrop Grumman Newport News (then called Newport News Shipbuilding & Drydock Company) in Newport News, Virginia on 30 September 1998 and her keel was laid down on 22 May 2004. She was christened on 21 April 2007 sponsored by Linda Bowman, wife of Admiral Frank L. "Skip" Bowman, former director of Naval Reactors.

The boat has physical connections to previous ships named North Carolina. Sections of the teak decking from USS North Carolina (BB-55), a fast battleship that served in World War II, are reused within the submarine, and several pieces from a silver serving set made for USS North Carolina (ACR-12), a World War I-era armored cruiser, transferred through the state governor to the battleship will be used aboard the submarine.

North Carolina joined the fleet on 21 February 2008, after problems with the boat's steam valve and internal piping system had forced two delays in the acceptance of the vessel. Welding issues in the internal piping system scuttled a first-planned December 2007 delivery, and the discovery of an inadequate steam valve forced a further delay from January to February 2008.

The ship's official commissioning ceremony was held on 3 May 2008, in Wilmington, North Carolina. The submarine joined the U.S. Navy's Atlantic Fleet based in New London, Connecticut.

In 2010, North Carolina changed homeports from Naval Submarine Base New London to Naval Station Pearl Harbor. She left Groton for Pearl Harbor on 22 July 2010 and arrived at her new homeport, Joint Base Pearl Harbor–Hickam, on Monday, 15 November 2010 after her four-month transfer activities. During the transfer, the officers and crew of North Carolina conducted a series of exercises designed to test the boat's new combat systems and stealth capabilities. North Carolina is the third Virginia-class attack submarine to be homeported at Joint Base Pearl Harbor–Hickam and is assigned to Commander, Submarine Squadron 1.

== Gallery ==
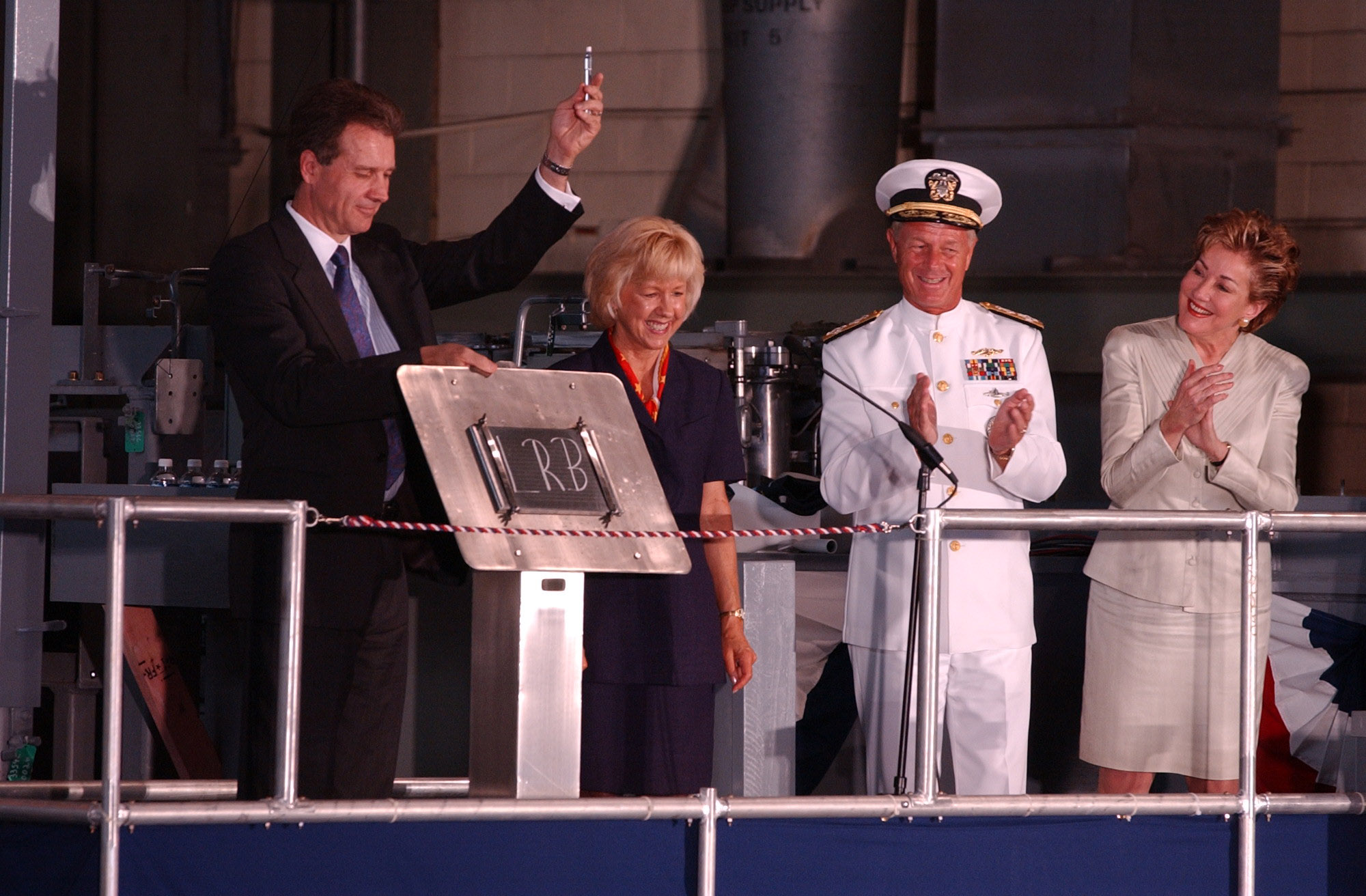
Keel laying ceremony 22 May 2004

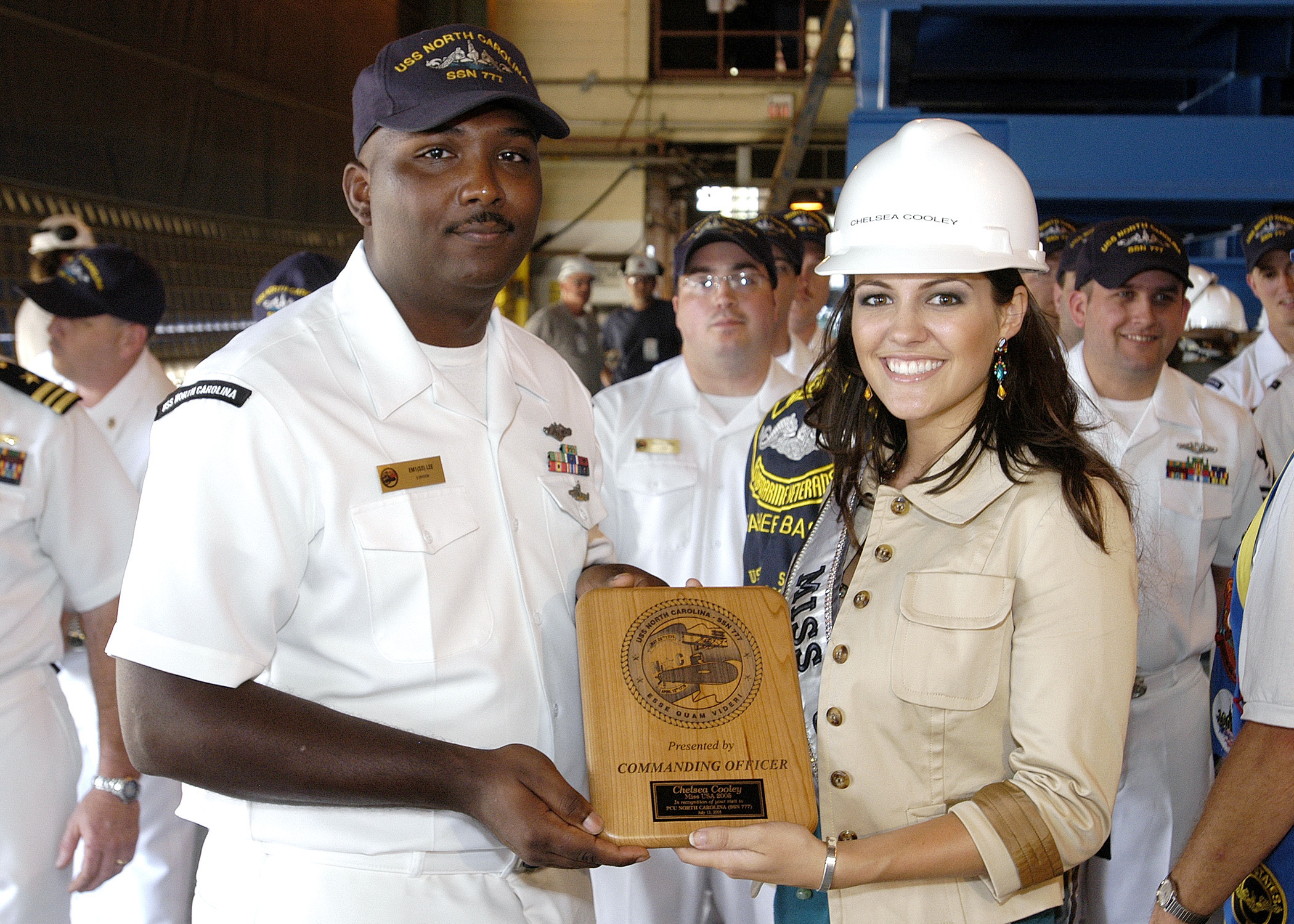
Miss USA 2005, Chelsea Cooley, during a tour of North Carolina, July 2005

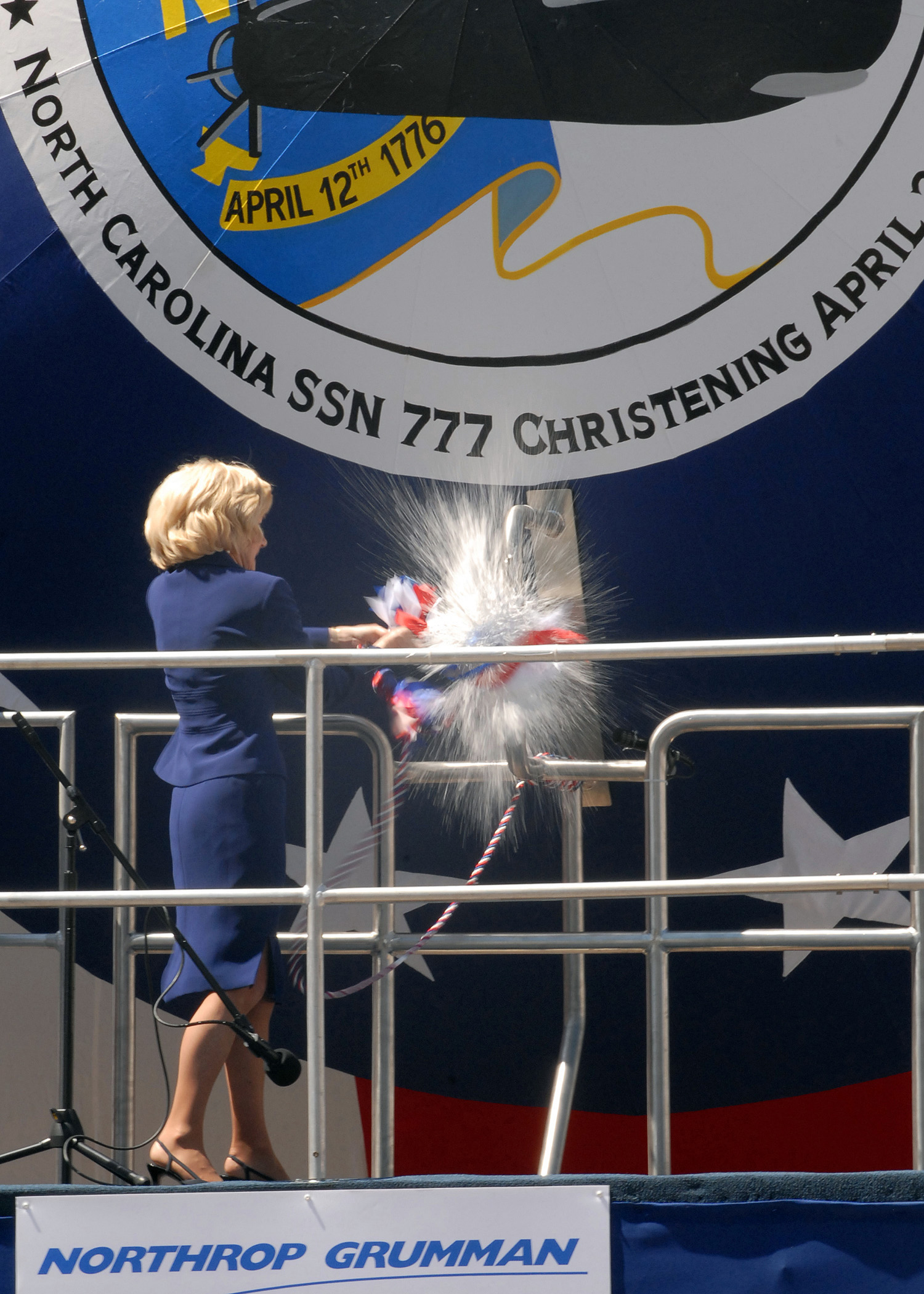
Christening of North Carolina 21 April 2007

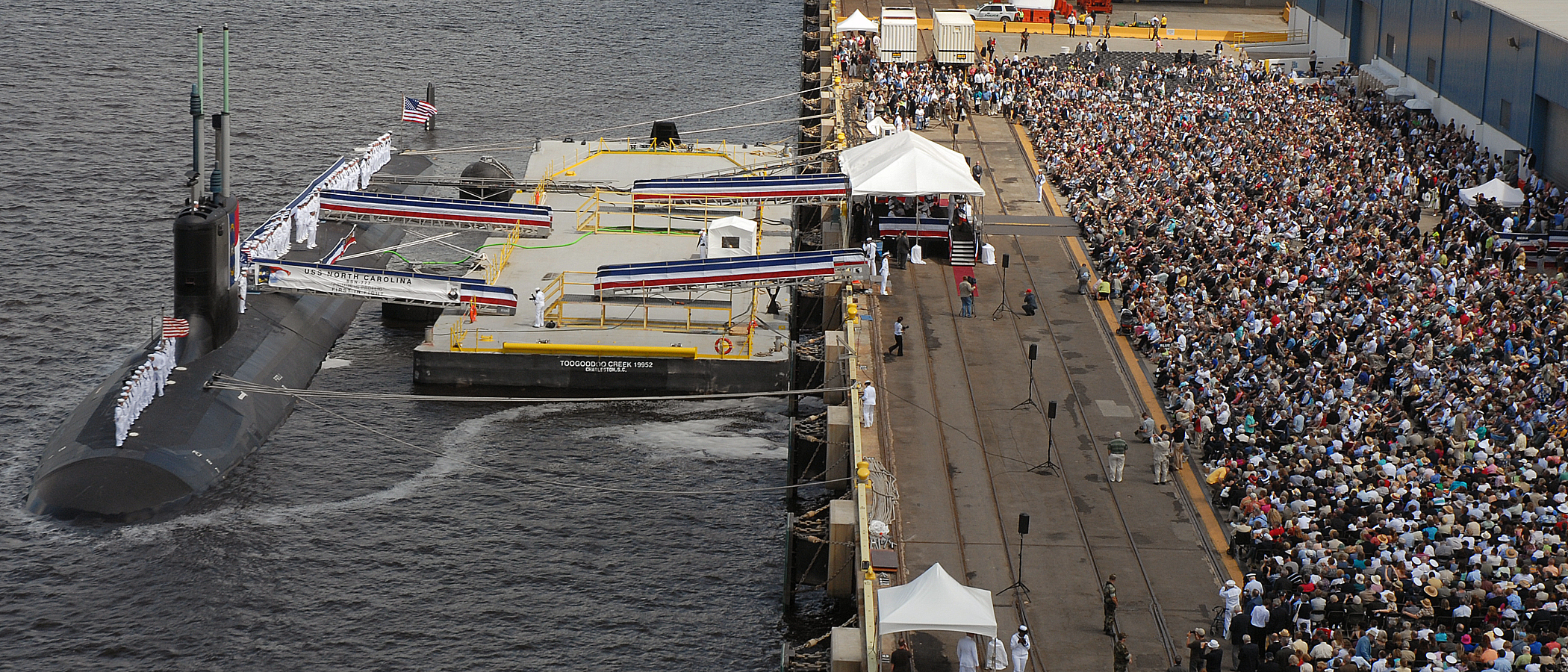
Commissioning ceremony, 3 May 2008
