= USS Mississippi (SSN-782) =

US Navy Virginia-class submarine

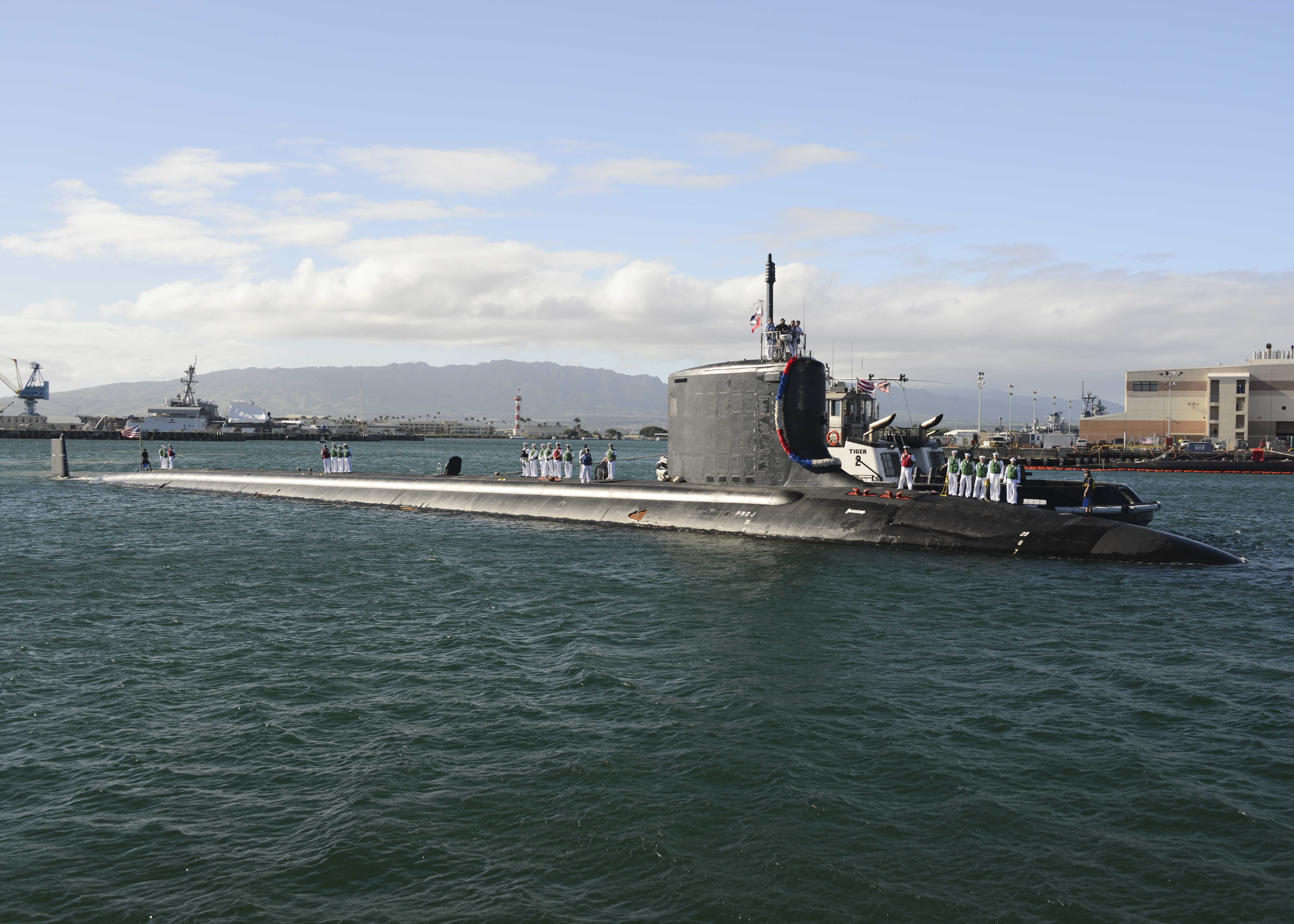
- Mississippi arrives at Pearl Harbor, 25 November 2014.

History
- Name: USS Mississippi
- Namesake: State of Mississippi
- Awarded: 14 August 2003
- Builder: General Dynamics Electric Boat
- Cost: $2.6 billion
- Laid down: 9 June 2010
- Sponsored by: Allison Stiller
- Christened: 3 December 2011
- Commissioned: 2 June 2012 in Pascagoula, MS
- Home port: Naval Station Pearl Harbor
- Motto: Latin "Virtute Et Armis" English "By Valor and Arms"
- Status: in active service
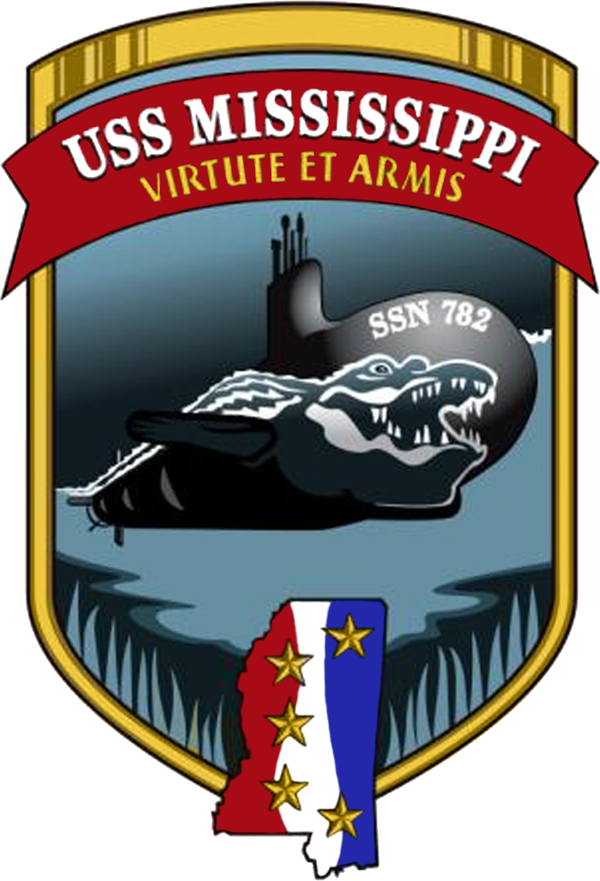
- Badge

General characteristics
- Class & type: Virginia-class submarine
- Displacement: 7800 tons light, 7800 tons full
- Length: 114.9 meters (377 feet)
- Beam: 10.3 meters (34 feet)
- Propulsion: 1 × S9G PWR nuclear reactor 280,000 shp (210 MW), HEU 93%; 2 × steam turbines 40,000 shp (30 MW); 1 × single shaft pump-jet propulsor; 1 × secondary propulsion motor
- Speed: 25+ knots (46 km/h)
- Range: Essentially unlimited distance; 33 years
- Test depth: 800+ feet (250 meters)
- Complement: 132 officers and men

USS Mississippi (SSN-782) is a Virginia-class submarine of the United States Navy, named for the state of Mississippi. The contract to build her was awarded to the Electric Boat Division of General Dynamics Corporation in Groton, Connecticut on 14 August 2003. Mississippi's keel was laid down on 9 June 2010. Mississippi was christened on 3 December 2011 at General Dynamics Electric Boat in Groton, Connecticut. Allison Stiller, Deputy Assistant Secretary of the Navy, is the ship's sponsor. The submarine was commissioned at a ceremony on 2 June 2012 in Pascagoula, Mississippi. SSN-782 was delivered 12 months ahead of schedule and $60 million below planned cost.

On 25 November 2014, Mississippi arrived at Joint Base Pearl Harbor-Hickam in Pearl Harbor, Hawaii, where the ship is permanently assigned to Submarine Squadron 1 of the United States Pacific Fleet.
