= USS Tucson (SSN-770) =

Los Angeles-class nuclear-powered attack submarine of the US Navy

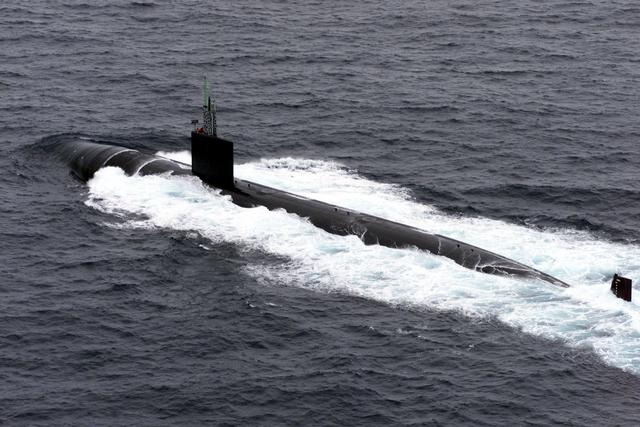
- USS Tucson (SSN-770)

History

United States
- Name: USS Tucson
- Namesake: City of Tucson
- Operator: United States Navy
- Ordered: 10 June 1988
- Awarded: 16 September 1989
- Builder: Newport News Shipbuilding and Dry Dock Company
- Laid down: 15 August 1991
- Launched: 20 March 1994
- Sponsored by: Mrs. Diane C. Kent
- Commissioned: 18 August 1995 postponed to (9 Sep 1995), USS Tucson (SSN 770) was commissioned, Original commission date was delayed by Hurricane Felix. Boat got underway for the storm so the ceremony was delayed to September.
- Home port: Naval Station Pearl Harbor
- Identification: MMSI number: 369970228; Callsign: NTAZ
- Status: in active service
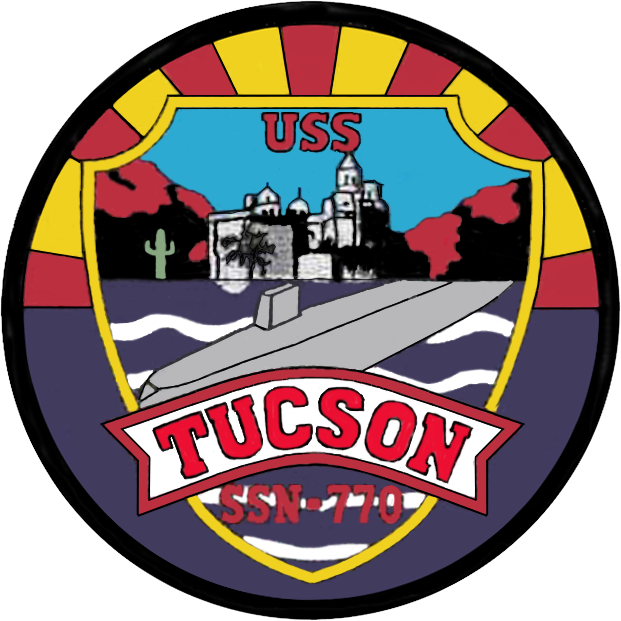
- Badge

General characteristics
- Class & type: Los Angeles-class submarine
- Displacement: 6,000 tons light, 6,927 tons full, 927 tons dead
- Length: 362 ft (110 m)
- Beam: 33 ft (10 m)
- Draft: 31 ft (9.4 m)
- Propulsion: 1 × S6G PWR nuclear reactor with D2W core (165 MW), HEU 93.5%; 2 × steam turbines (33,500) shp; 1 × shaft; 1 × secondary propulsion motor 325 hp (242 kW)
- Test depth: 470–500 m (1,542–1,640 ft)
- Complement: 12 officers, 98 enlisted
- Armament: 4 × 21 in (533 mm) torpedo tubes; 12 × vertical launch Tomahawk missiles

USS Tucson (SSN-770), a Los Angeles-class submarine, was the second ship of the United States Navy to be named for Tucson, Arizona. The contract to build her was awarded to Newport News Shipbuilding and Dry Dock Company in Newport News, Virginia on 10 June 1988 and her keel was laid down on 15 August 1991. She was launched on 20 March 1994 sponsored by Mrs. Diane C. Kent.

== History ==
Tucson was originally supposed to be commissioned on 18 August 1995, however, Hurricane Felix threatened the Virginian coastline, and the U.S. Navy decided to sortie the fleet, to prevent damage to ships in port if the hurricane made landfall. Tucson was the last ship to leave port, in case the prediction for landfall changed. As it turned out, the hurricane never did make landfall, but Tucson was at sea on 18 August. Upon returning to port, the commissioning ceremony was quickly rescheduled for 19 September 1995. At the new commissioning ceremony, the commanding officer, Commander Duane M. Baker, declared that for the next two hours, it was officially 18 August.

In June 1996, Tucson was struck by the Military Sealift Command vehicle cargo ship USNS Gilliland while moored in port at Newport News. A sudden windstorm caused Gilliland to break free from her mooring and cross the harbor, colliding with Tucson and the destroyer USS Deyo moored behind her. While Deyo suffered the most damage, Tucson suffered minor damage to her AN/BRA-34 antenna.

From September 1996 to October 1996, Tucson changed her home port. Tucson left Norfolk, Virginia, passed through the Panama Canal and stopped in San Diego, California for five days. VIPs from Tucson, Arizona, were allowed to ride on three separate short cruises, and then busloads of tourists from the city of Tucson came for tours of the submarine while in port. Following this port visit, Tucson continued on to arrive in Pearl Harbor, Hawaii.

Tucson left for her first deployment ever, to the Western Pacific Ocean, in February 1998. At that time, tensions between the United Nations and Iraq had escalated drastically. In the 30 days leading up to departure, the government of Iraq had blocked access to the United Nations Special Commission (UNSCOM) and had withdrawn cooperation with the UNSCOM monitoring teams. The ship traveled as far west as the Persian Gulf before returning to Pearl Harbor in August 1998. It was during this period of time that the PBS series Nova filmed the episode "Battlegroups" aboard Tucson.

On 19 May 2004, Tucson departed for a Western Pacific deployment.
