= USS Colorado (SSN-788) =

US Navy Virginia-class submarine

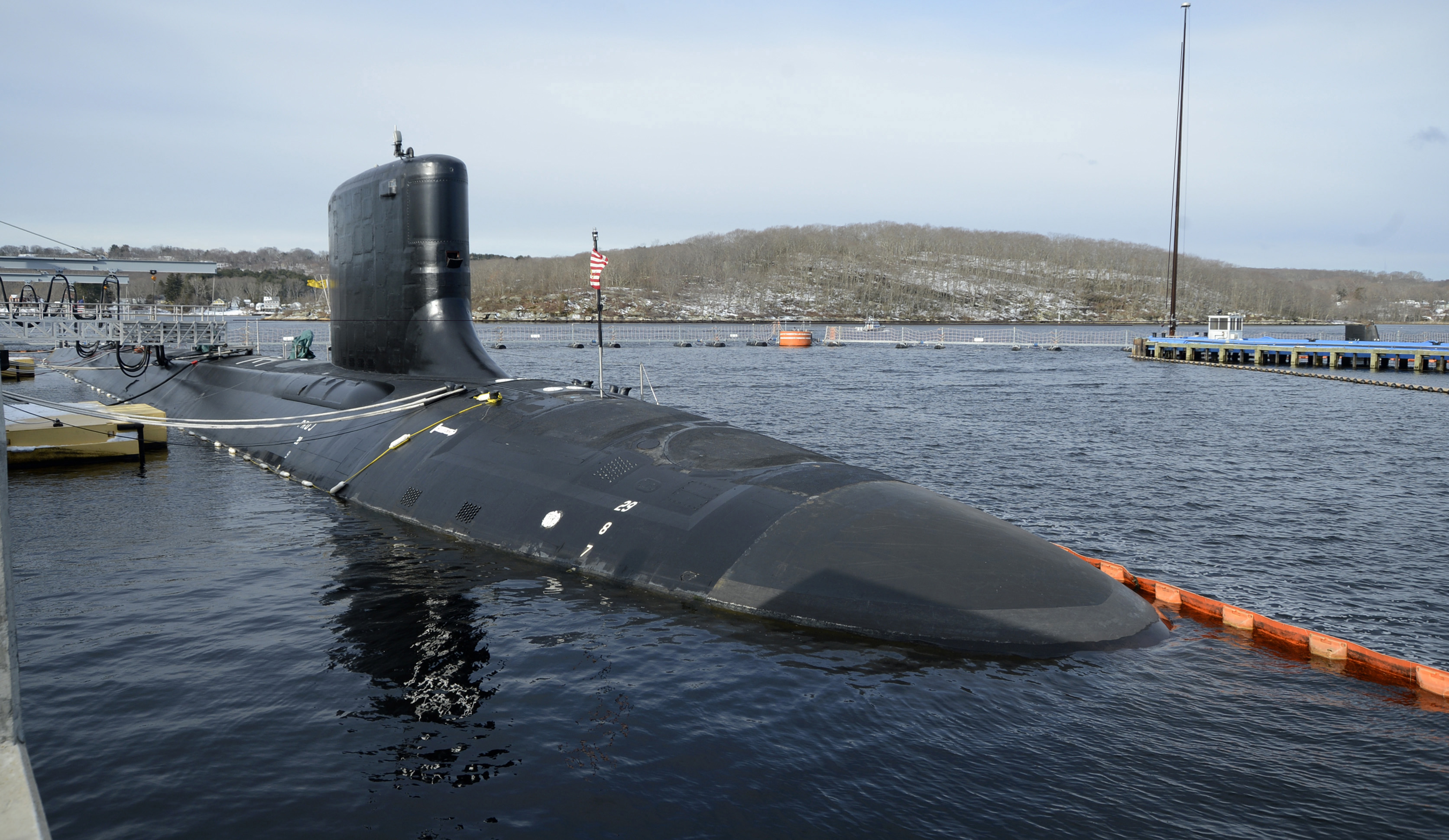
- USS Colorado (SSN-788) in March 2018

History

United States
- Namesake: The State of Colorado
- Awarded: 22 December 2008
- Builder: Electric Boat
- Cost: ~$2.6 billion
- Laid down: 7 March 2015
- Launched: 29 December 2016
- Sponsored by: Annie Mabus
- Christened: 3 December 2016
- Commissioned: 17 March 2018
- Home port: Joint Base Pearl Harbor-Hickam, Hawaii
- Motto: Terra Marique Indomita (By land and sea, untamed)
- Status: Active Service
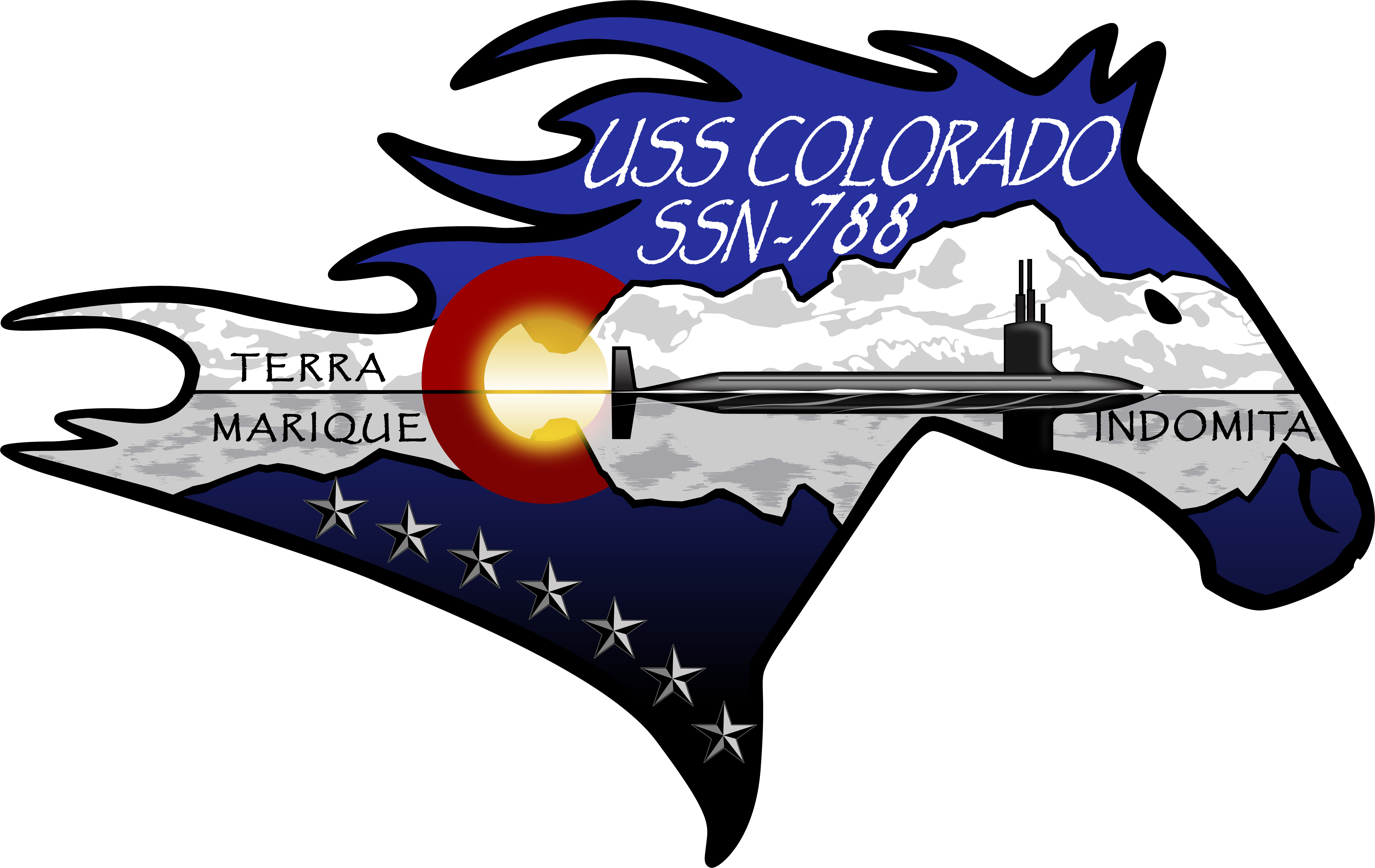
- Badge

General characteristics
- Class & type: Virginia-class submarine
- Displacement: 7800 tons light, 7800 tons full
- Length: 114.9 meters (377 feet)
- Beam: 10.3 meters (34 feet)
- Installed power: 40,000 SHP
- Propulsion: S9G reactor
- Speed: 25 knots (46 km/h)
- Range: Essentially unlimited distance; 33 years
- Test depth: greater than 800 feet (240 meters)
- Complement: 134 officers and men
- Armament: 4 21-inch torpedo tubes, 2 Virginia Payload Tubes, capable of holding 6 Tomahawk missiles each for a total of 38 weapons

USS Colorado (SSN-788) is a nuclear powered United States Navy Virginia-class attack submarine, named for the State of Colorado. She is the fifteenth of her class and fifth of the significantly redesigned Block III, including a revised bow and VLS technology from the Ohio class of guided missile submarines. She was constructed by Huntington Ingalls Industries in partnership with the Electric Boat division of General Dynamics in Newport News, Virginia, with the initial contract awarded on 22 December 2008.

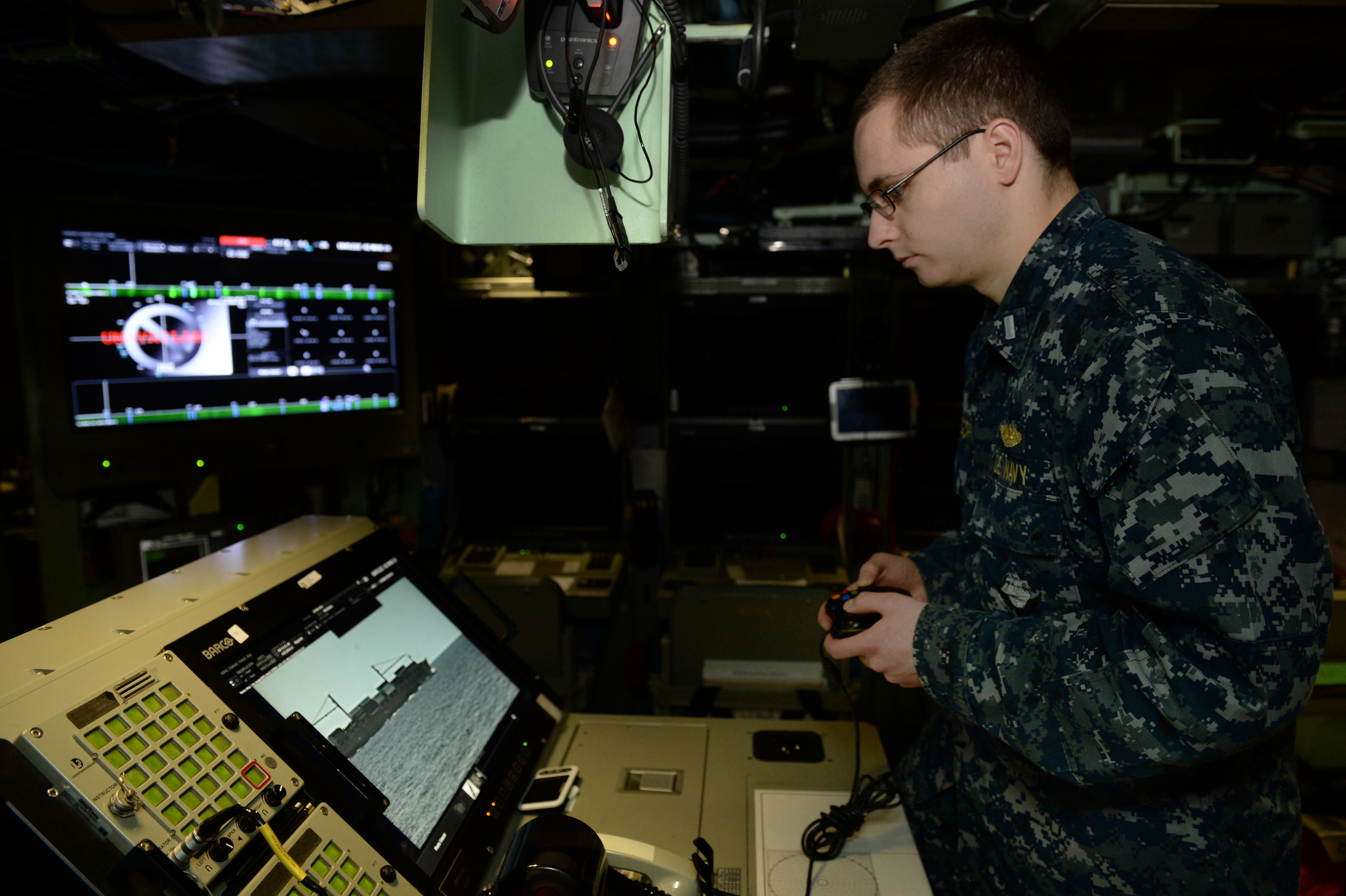
A sailor using an Xbox 360 controller to control the photonic masts of the USS Colorado (SSN-788) in 2018. It is the first submarine to use this tens of dollar controller instead of Lockheed Martin's billed joystick $38,000.

The official naming ceremony was on 25 June 2012. Her keel was laid down on 7 March 2015 and she was christened and launched on 3 December 2016. Her sponsor is Annie Mabus, daughter of former Navy Secretary Ray Mabus She was commissioned on 17 March 2018.

== Deployment to Australia ==
In October 2026, Colorado was announced as the first Virginia-class submarine to be based at the HMAS Stirling naval base in Western Australia, under the AUKUS trilateral security partnership, from late 2027.
