= USS Missouri (SSN-780) =

US Navy Virginia-class submarine

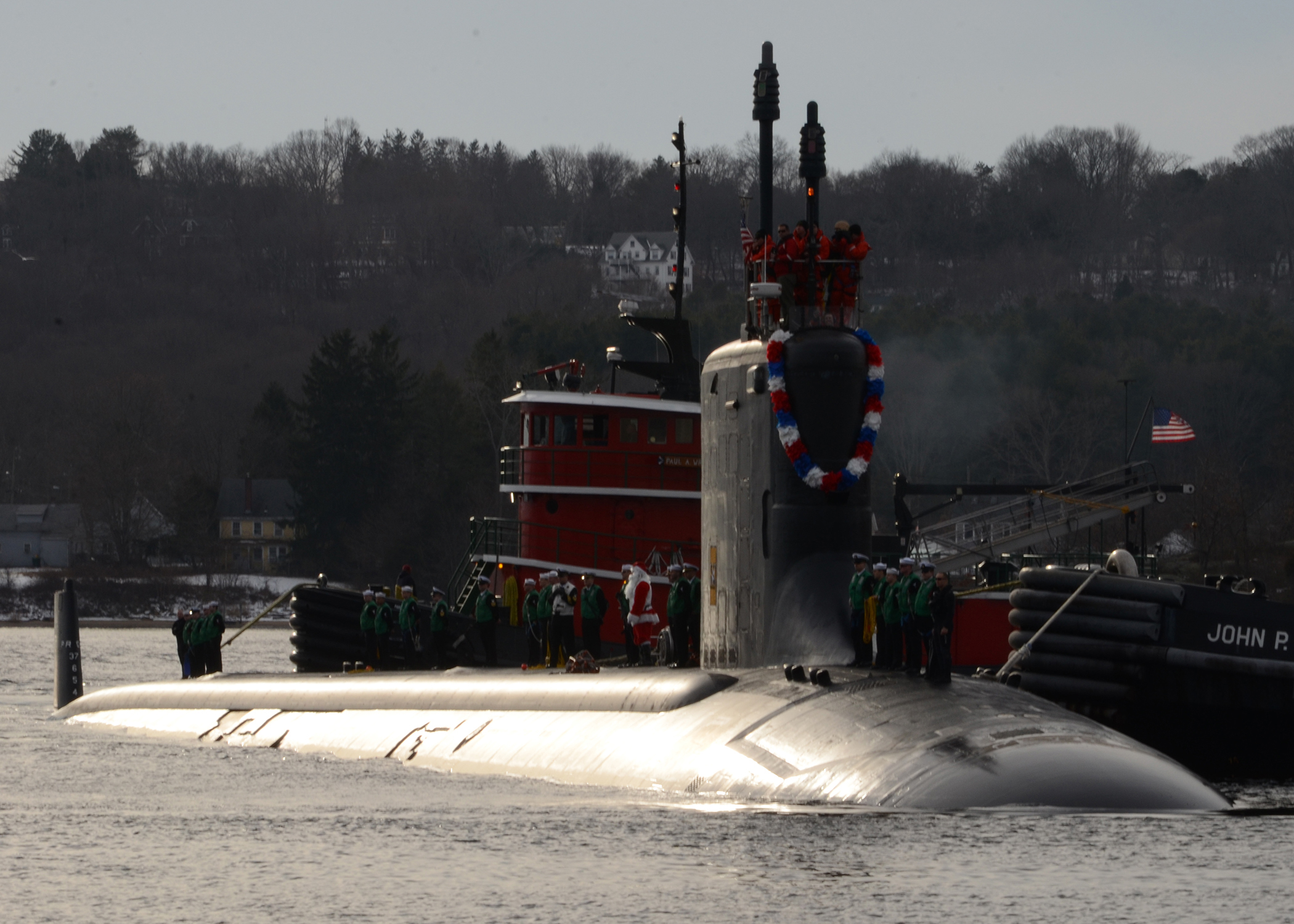
- Missouri arrives at Naval Submarine Base New London in December 2013.

History

United States
- Namesake: The State of Missouri
- Awarded: 14 August 2003
- Builder: General Dynamics Electric Boat
- Laid down: 27 September 2008
- Launched: 20 November 2009
- Sponsored by: Rebecca W. Gates
- Christened: 5 December 2009
- Commissioned: 31 July 2010
- Home port: Pearl Harbor, Hawaii
- Motto: "United we stand, divided we fall"
- Nickname(s): Mighty Mo
- Status: in active service
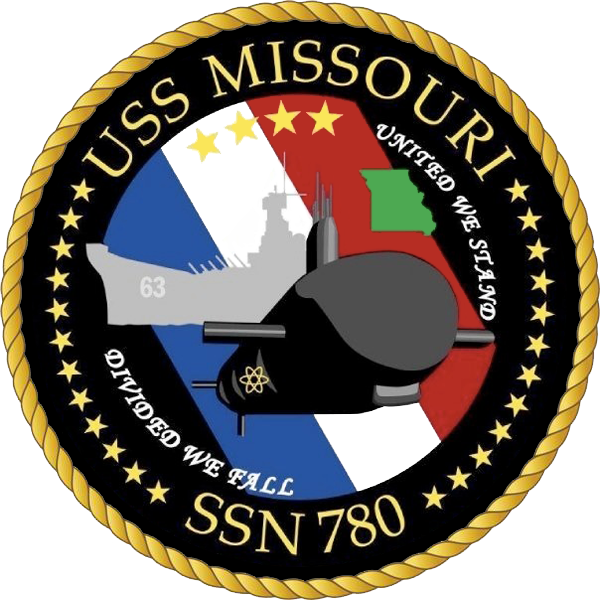
- Badge

General characteristics
- Class & type: Virginia-class submarine
- Displacement: 7800 tons submerged
- Length: 377 feet (115 meters)
- Beam: 34 feet (10 meters)
- Propulsion: 1 × S9G PWR nuclear reactor 280,000 shp (210 MW), HEU 93%; 2 × steam turbines 40,000 shp (30 MW); 1 × single shaft pump-jet propulsor; 1 × secondary propulsion motor
- Speed: 25+ knots (28+ mph, 46+ km/h)
- Range: Essentially unlimited distance; 33 years
- Test depth: greater than 800 feet (240 meters)
- Complement: 134 officers and men
- Armament: 12 × VLS (BGM-109 Tomahawk cruise missile) 4 × 533mm torpedo tubes (Mk-48 ADCAP torpedo)

USS Missouri (SSN-780) is the seventh Virginia-class attack submarine and the fourth ship in the United States Navy named in honor of the U.S. state of Missouri. She was completed, and delivered, nine months ahead of schedule and under construction budget.

== History ==
The contract to build Missouri was awarded to the Electric Boat Division of General Dynamics Corporation in Groton, Connecticut on 14 August 2003. Her keel was laid down on 27 September 2008. The submarine was placed in the water on 20 November 2009, and christened on 5 December 2009. Missouri's sponsor is Becky Gates, wife of Secretary of Defense Robert Gates.

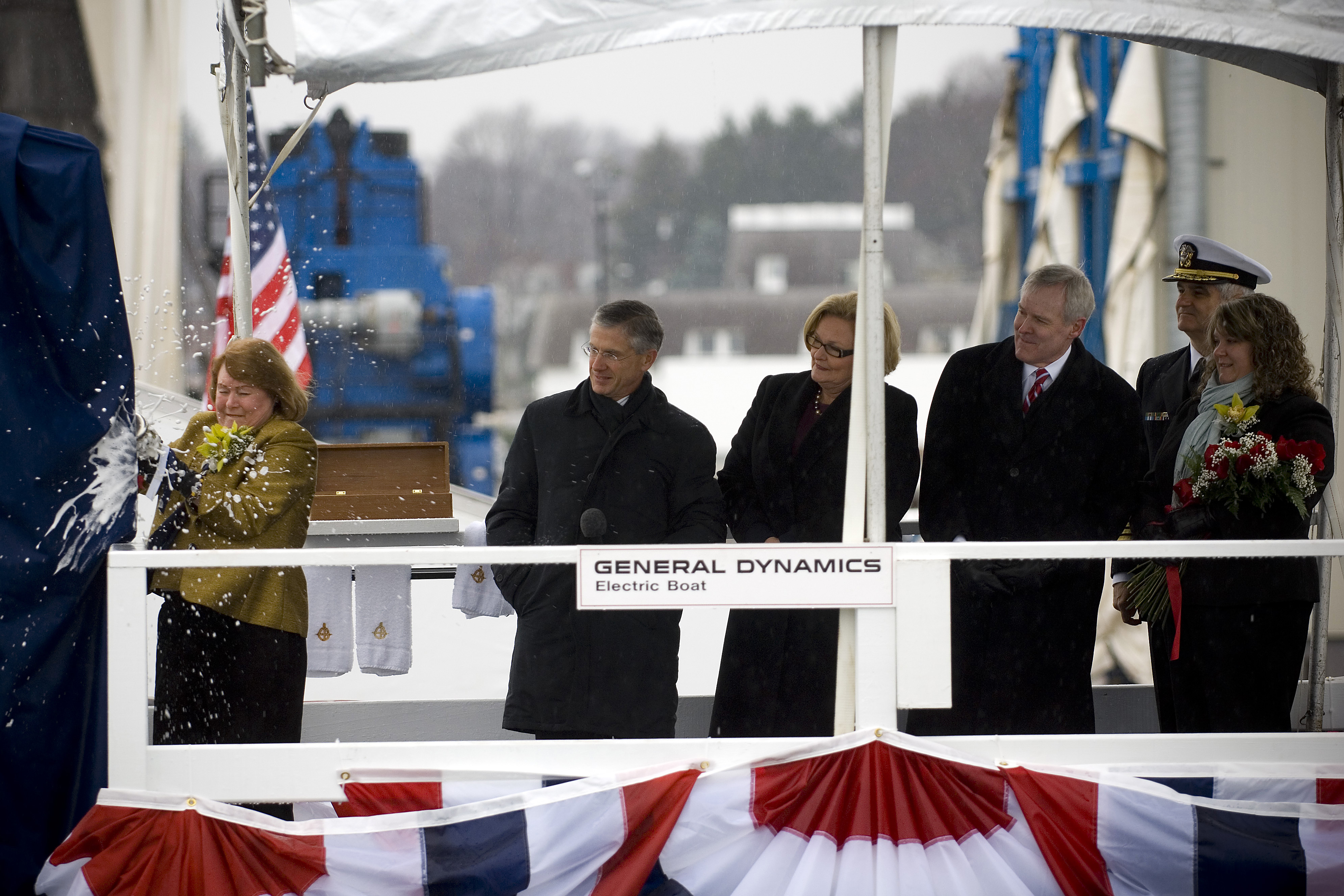
Rebecca Gates christens Missouri at General Dynamics Electric Boat in Groton, Connecticut

Missouri was commissioned on 31 July 2010. Her first assignment is with Submarine Squadron 4 (SUBRON 4) based at US Naval Submarine Base New London, Groton, CT.

The 7,800-ton submarine Missouri was built under a joint arrangement between General Dynamics Electric Boat and Northrop Grumman Shipbuilding-Newport News. Sections of the submarine were built at both shipyards with final assembly completed at one or the other. In this instance, SSN-780 was assembled at the Groton/New London, Connecticut shipyard. Final assembly occurred alternately between the two. During the design and construction phases both shipyards collaborated to complete each submarine.

Missouri completed her first 6-month deployment to the U.S. 6th Fleet on 20 December 2013. In March 2014 Missouri made an 11-week-long surge deployment in the Northern Atlantic, just three months after her previous deployment possibly linked to the Annexation of Crimea by the Russian Federation, which took place in March 2014. The submarine continued to operate with the U.S. 6th fleet in 2015.

On 26 January 2018, Missouri sailed into her new homeport of Pearl Harbor, Hawaii from Groton, Connecticut.

On 31 March 2022, Missouri returned to Pearl Harbor after a deployment to the 7th fleet.
