= USS Indiana (SSN-789) =

US Navy Virginia-class submarine

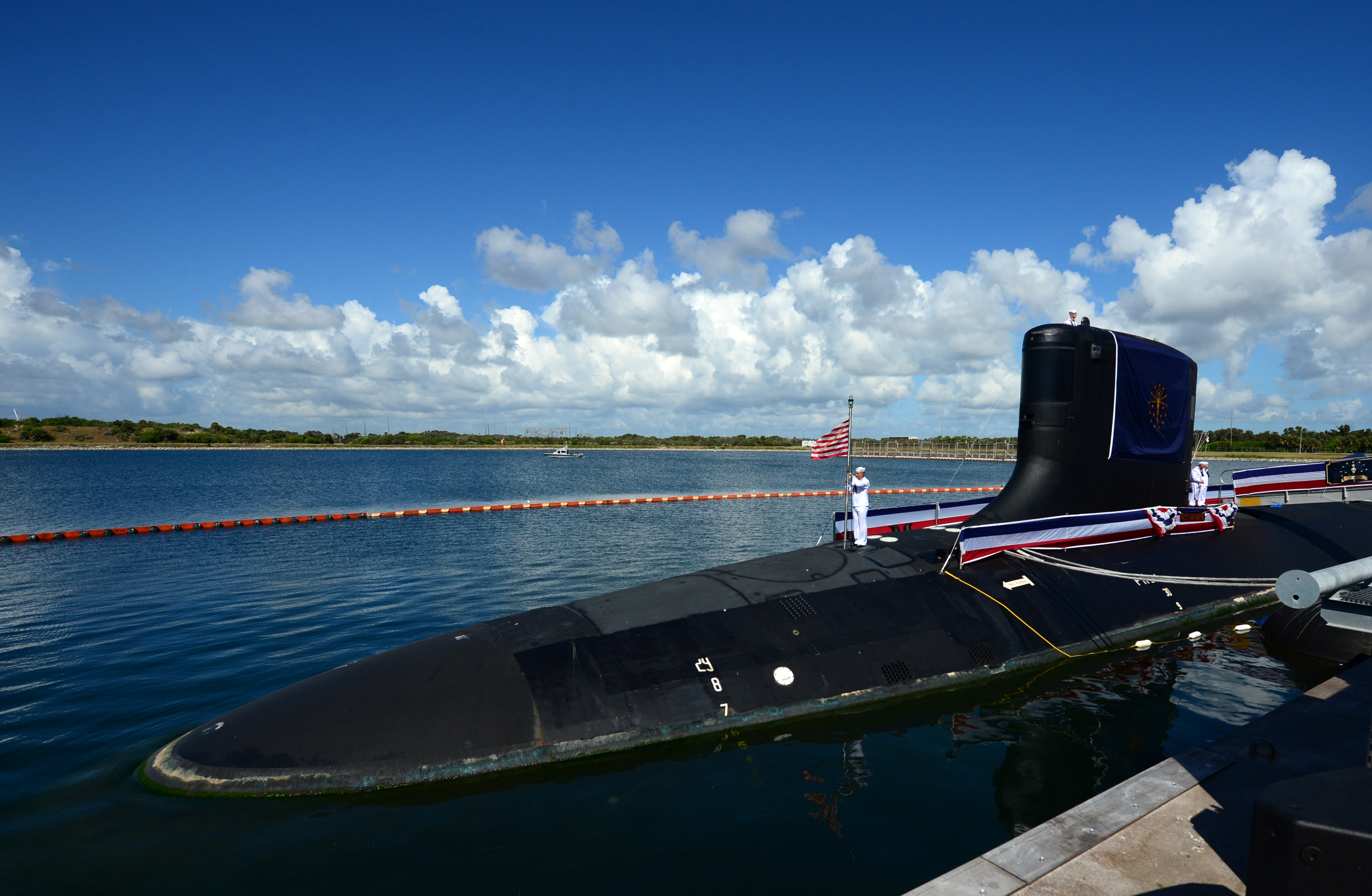
- USS Indiana (SSN-789) at her commissioning ceremony

History

United States
- Name: USS Indiana
- Namesake: State of Indiana
- Awarded: 22 December 2008
- Builder: Newport News Shipbuilding
- Laid down: 16 May 2015
- Launched: 9 June 2017
- Sponsored by: Diane Donald
- Christened: 29 April 2017
- Acquired: 25 June 2018
- Commissioned: 29 September 2018
- Home port: Pearl Harbor, Hawaii
- Motto: "Silent Victors"
- Status: Active Service
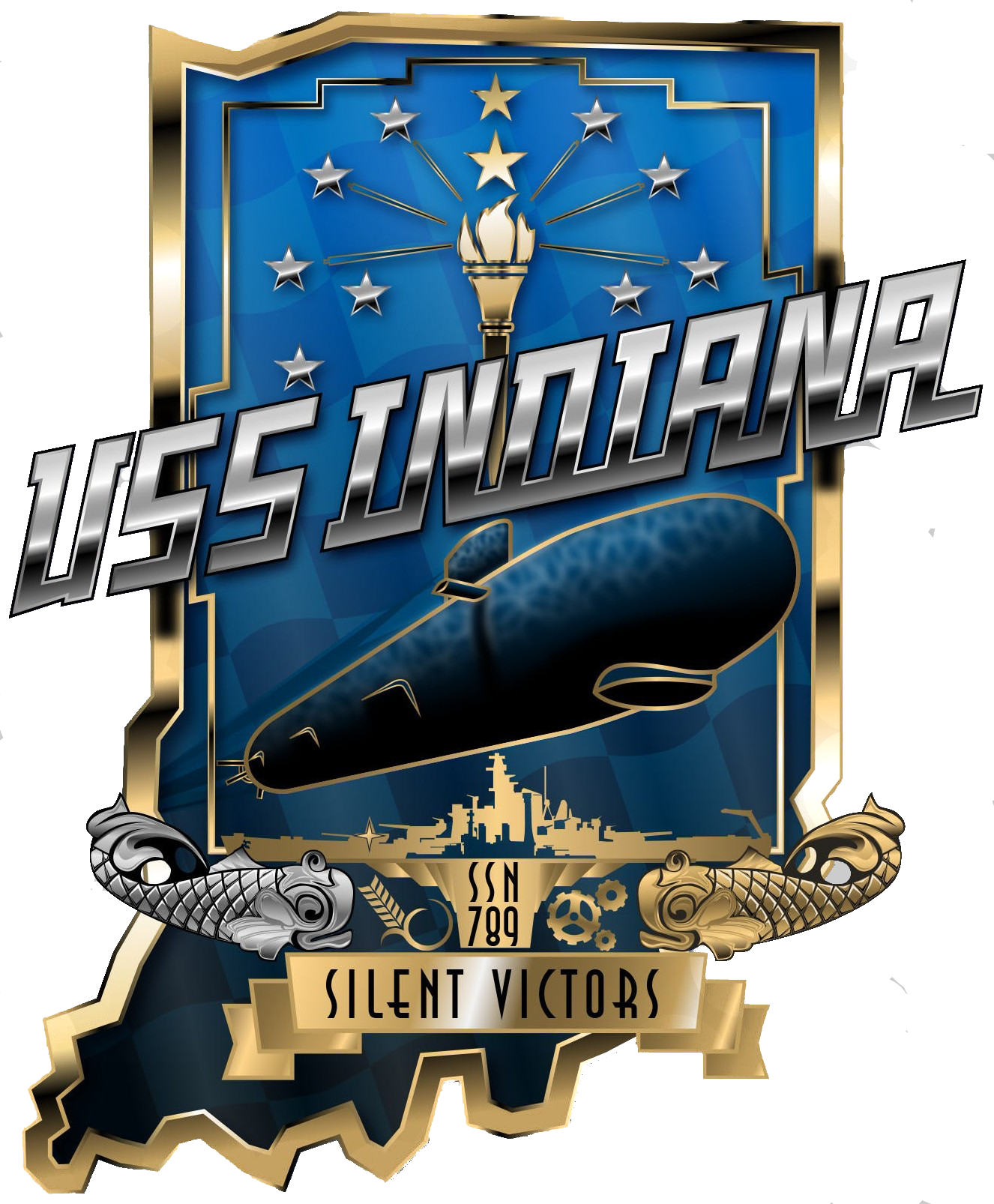
- Badge

General characteristics
- Class & type: Virginia-class submarine
- Displacement: 7800 tons light, 7800 tons full
- Length: 114.9 meters (377 feet)
- Beam: 10.3 meters (34 feet)
- Propulsion: 1 × S9G PWR nuclear reactor 280,000 shp (210 MW), HEU 93%; 2 × steam turbines 40,000 shp (30 MW); 1 × single shaft pump-jet propulsor; 1 × secondary propulsion motor
- Speed: 25 knots (46 km/h)
- Range: Essentially unlimited distance; 33 years
- Test depth: greater than 800 feet (240 meters)
- Complement: 134 officers and crew

USS Indiana (SSN-789) is a nuclear powered United States Navy Virginia-class attack submarine, named for the State of Indiana. She is the sixteenth of her class and sixth of the significantly redesigned Block III, including a revised bow and VLS technology from the Ohio-class of guided missile submarines. Indiana was constructed by Huntington Ingalls Industries in partnership with the Electric Boat division of General Dynamics in Newport News, Virginia, with the initial contract awarded on 22 December 2008. Her keel was laid on 16 May 2015 and she was launched on 9 June 2017. The boat was christened on 29 April 2017 and sponsored by Diane Donald, wife of Admiral Kirkland H. Donald, USN (ret). She was commissioned on 29 September 2018 at Port Canaveral, Florida. In 2024, USS Indiana participated in Operation Ice Camp. In 2025, USS Indiana conducted a homeport shift from Groton, CT to Pearl Harbor, HI.

== Crest ==
The gold torch and stars are symbols from the State Flag of Indiana. The torch represents liberty and enlightenment; the rays surrounding the torch represent their far-reaching influence. The stars in a circle surrounding the torch signify each state to join the Union before Indiana, which was the 19th state. Two battleships, silhouetted above "SSN 789", represent BB-1 and BB-58, the ships that previously bore the Indiana namesake. Three gears and a head of wheat on either side of "SSN 789" represent the agriculture and industry native to the state of Indiana. The stylized "USS INDIANA" banner and the finish line racing flag pay tribute to the Indianapolis Motor Speedway and the Indy Car racing heritage of the State of Indiana. Silver and gold dolphins on either side of the head of wheat and gears represent the technical prowess of the enlisted and officer submarine community. The crest is encompassed by a gold outline of the state of Indiana.
