= Mt. Lebanon Historic District =

Historic district in Allegheny County, U.S.

Coordinates: 40°22′30″N 80°03′00″W

- U.S. National Register of Historic Places
- U.S. Historic district
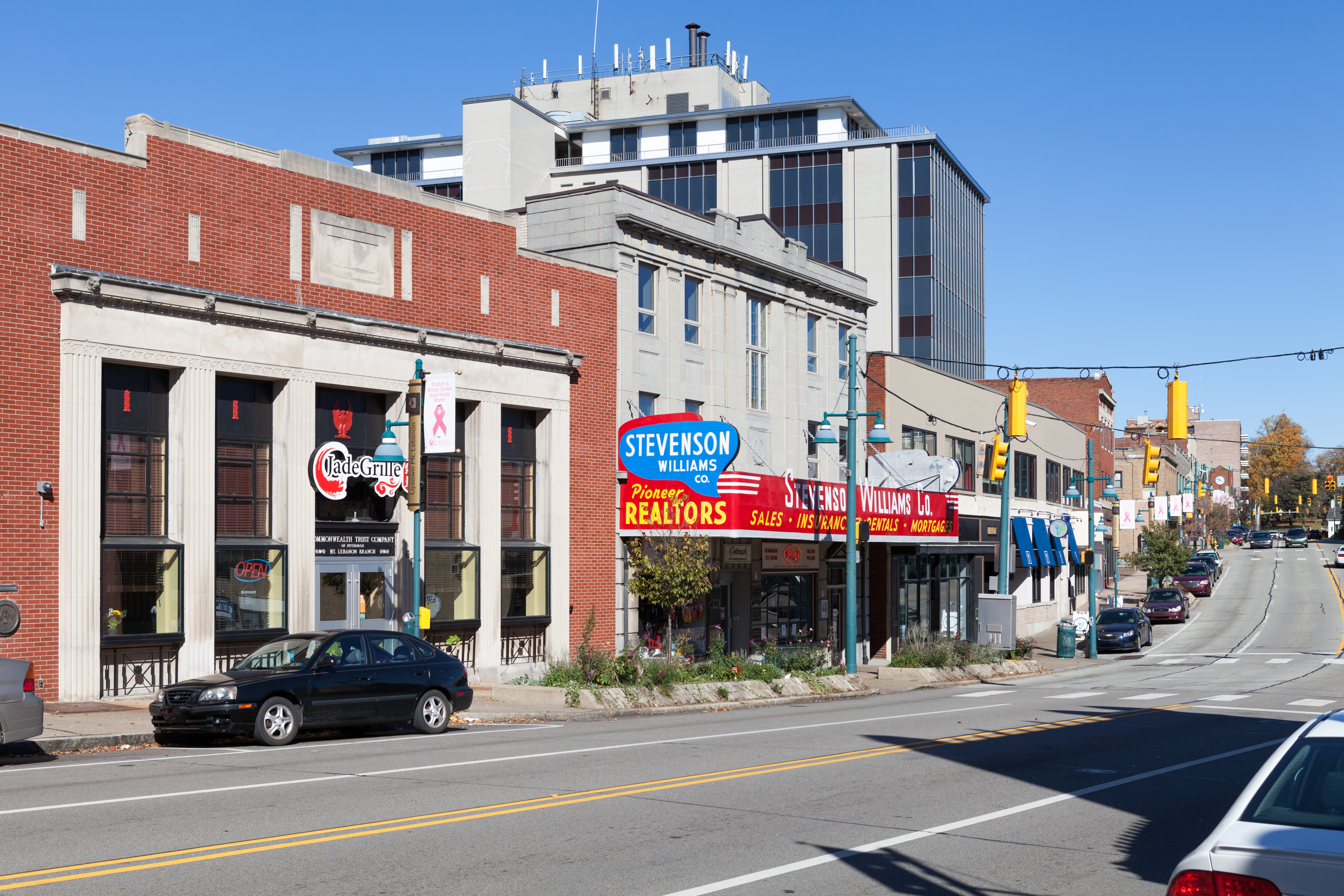
- Washington Road at Alfred Street

- Location within Pennsylvania

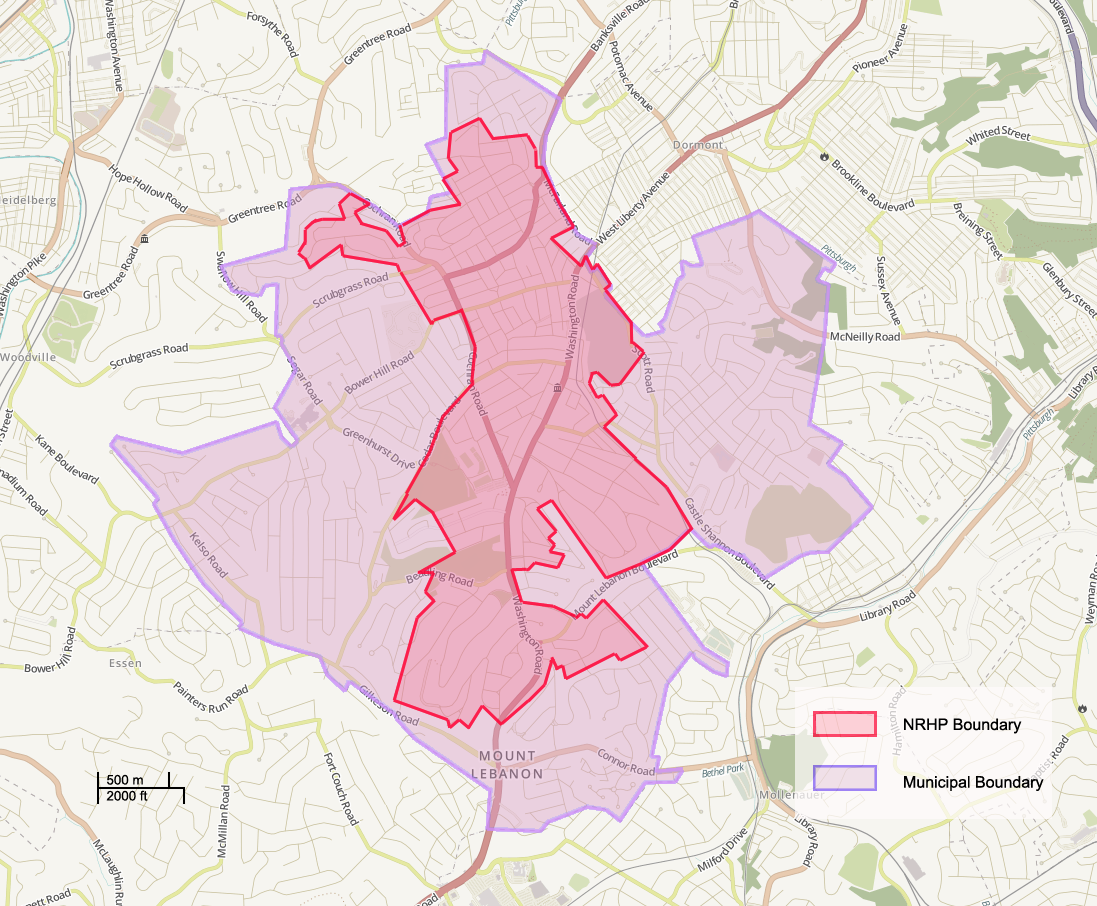
- Area: 1,306.0 acres (528.5 ha)
- Built: 1874–1945
- NRHP reference No.: 14000813
- Added to NRHP: September 30, 2014

The Mt. Lebanon Historic District is a historic district located in Mt. Lebanon, Pennsylvania, a suburb of Pittsburgh. The district contains 3,341 contributing buildings and 21 contributing sites. encompassing 1,306 acres. Built around the original Pittsburgh Regional Transit system, the district is recognized for its significance as an example of an early streetcar suburb in the United States.

== History ==
Mt. Lebanon's transformation from an agricultural community into a suburban, transit-centered area began during the early 20th century. The introduction of streetcar service in 1901 connected the township with the city Pittsburgh and encouraged residential development. The opening of the Liberty Tunnels in 1924 further increased suburban growth by improving automobile access between the South Hills and Downtown Pittsburgh.

Pittsburgh Regional Transit car along Washington Road

The historic district reflects this period of suburbanization and expansion between 1901 and 1945. Its development included numerous residential subdivisions, commercial districts, churches, schools, and public spaces.

The Mt. Lebanon Historic District was officially listed on the National Register of Historic Places on September 30, 2014. Its designation recognized the municipality's historical development and architectural significance as an example of an early automobile-oriented suburb.

== Architecture ==
The district encompasses approximately 1,306 acres and contains 38 historic residential subdivisions, two commercial areas, churches, public schools, parks, and the Mt. Lebanon Cemetery.

Within urbanized and transit-oriented business districts such as Washington Road (Uptown) and Beverly Road, multi-family homes and commercial properties make up the majority of contributing structures. These include duplexes in both traditional side-by-side and stacked up-and-down, tract houses, row-houses and townhomes, triplexes, low-rise brick apartment complexes, mid-rise and high-rise condominium and apartment buildings, and penthouses.

In neighborhoods surrounding the urban business districts, such as Virginia Manor, Seminole Hills, Hoodridge, Lebanon Hills, and Mission Hills, single-family homes contribute the majority of structures to the district, with homes varying in size and style. Among single-family homes, the common architectural styles include Foursquare, Queen Anne Tudor, French Provincial, Colonial Revival, Bungalow, Mid-century modern, Italian Renaissance, Art Moderne, Art Deco, and Spanish Mission.

== Transit ==
The municipality of Mt. Lebanon is served by the Pittsburgh Light Rail system. Mt. Lebanon station and Poplar station are both located along the Red Line, and located in the historic district boundaries. The Mt. Lebanon Tunnel, located on Washington Road (Uptown Mt. Lebanon) connects Mt. Lebanon station to Dormont.

== Gallery ==
=== Uptown ===

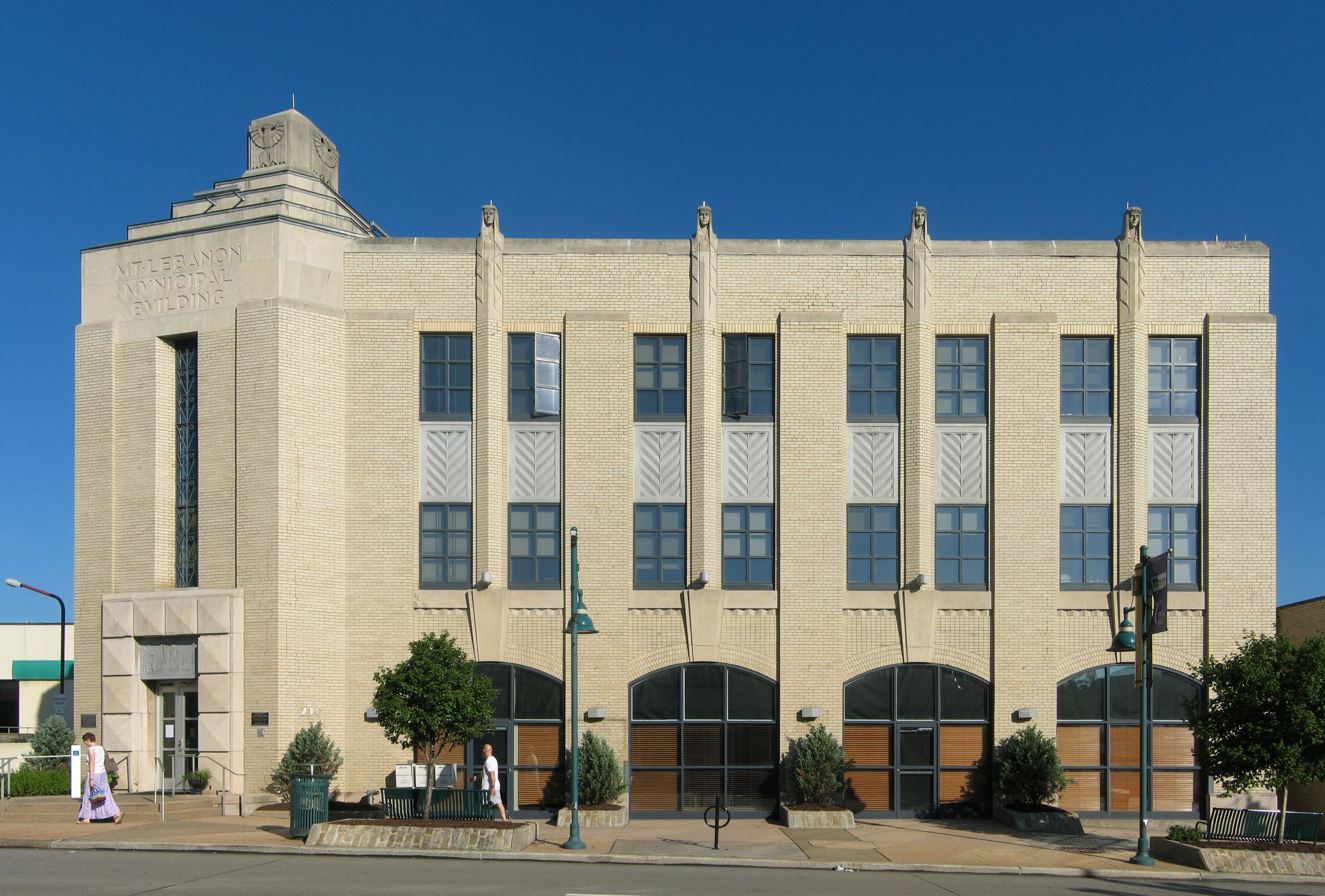
