= George Oliver Challinor =

American football coach and dentist

Biographical details
- Born: November 21, 1874; Pittsburgh, Pennsylvania, U.S.
- Died: July 12, 1956 (aged 81); Mount Lebanon, Pennsylvania, U.S.
- Education: Washington & Jefferson

Coaching career (HC unless noted)
- 1906: Carnegie Tech

Head coaching record
- Overall: 2–3–2

George Oliver Challinor (November 21, 1874 – July 12, 1956) was an American college football coach. He served as the head football coach at Carnegie Technical Schools—now known as Carnegie Mellon University—in Pittsburgh, Pennsylvania in 1906, compiling a record of 2–3–2. Challinor was an 1897 graduate of Washington & Jefferson College.

== Head coaching record ==
Year	Team	Overall	Conference	Standing	Bowl/playoffs
Carnegie Tech Tartans (Independent) (1906)
1906	Carnegie Tech	2–3–2			
Carnegie Tech:		2–3–2			
Total:		2–3–2			
