= Potomac station =

Potomac station could refer to:

- Potomac Station, Virginia, an inhabited place
- Potomac station (Metroway), a bus rapid transit station in Alexandria, Virginia
- Potomac station (PAAC), a light rail station in Pittsburgh, Pennsylvania
