= Kelton station =

Kelton
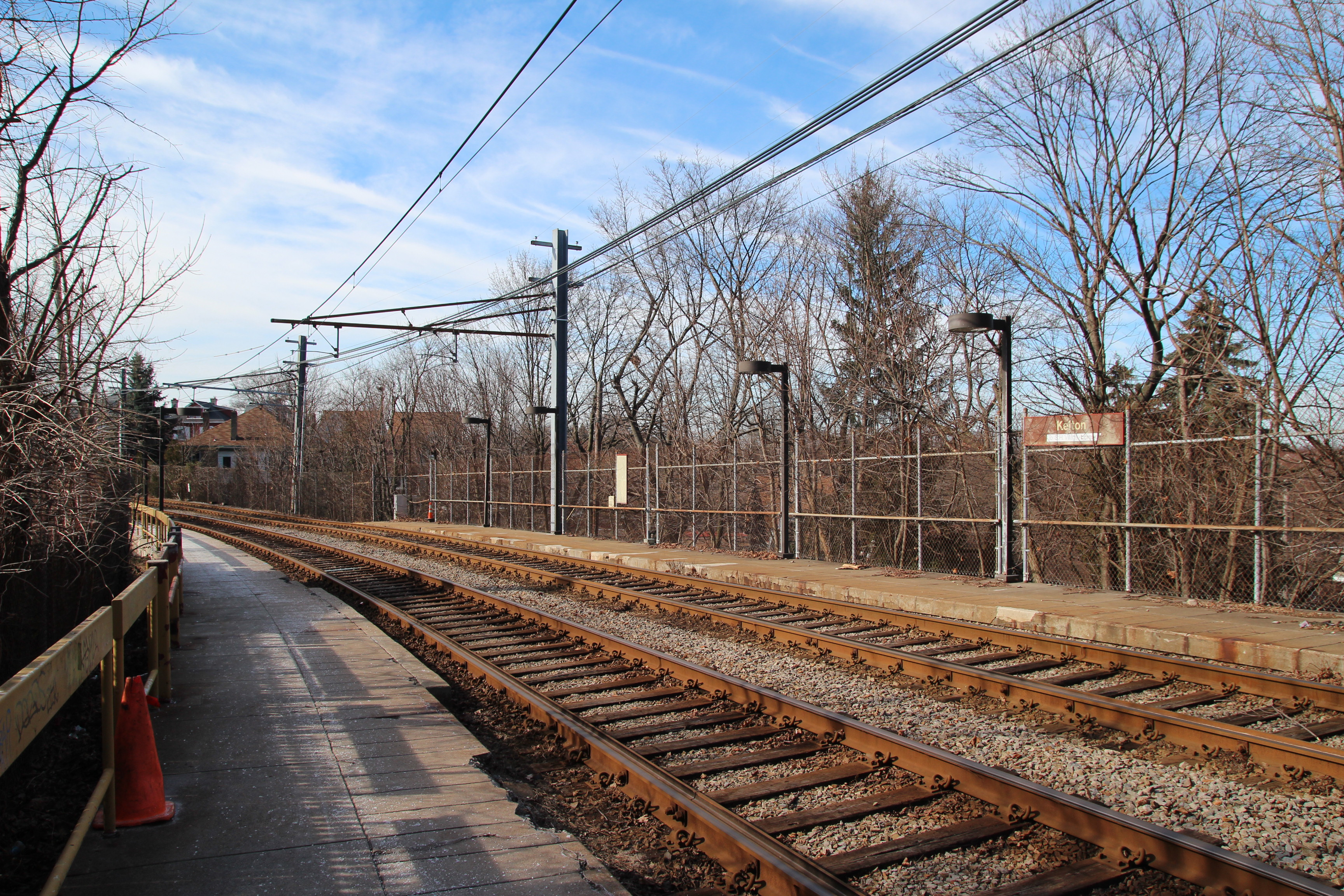
- The closed station, seen in 2017

General information
- Location: off of Kelton Avenue; Dormont, Pennsylvania
- Coordinates: 40.3954°N 80.0392°W
- Owner: Port Authority
- Platforms: 2 side platforms
- Tracks: 2

History
- Opened: May 22, 1987
- Closed: June 25, 2012

Former services
| Preceding station | Port Authority of Allegheny County | Following station |
|---|---|---|
| Potomac toward Allegheny | Red Line Overbrook Junction via Beechview | Dormont Junction toward Overbrook Junction or South Hills Village |
Location

Kelton was a station on the Port Authority of Allegheny County's light rail network, located in Dormont, Pennsylvania. The street level stop was located in a densely populated residential area. It served commuters within walking distance, providing access toward Downtown Pittsburgh, South Hills Village, or Library. The busy commercial corridor along West Liberty Avenue was also accessible, located two blocks from the station.

Kelton was one of eleven stops closed on June 25, 2012 as part of a system-wide consolidation effort.
