= Neeld station =

Neeld
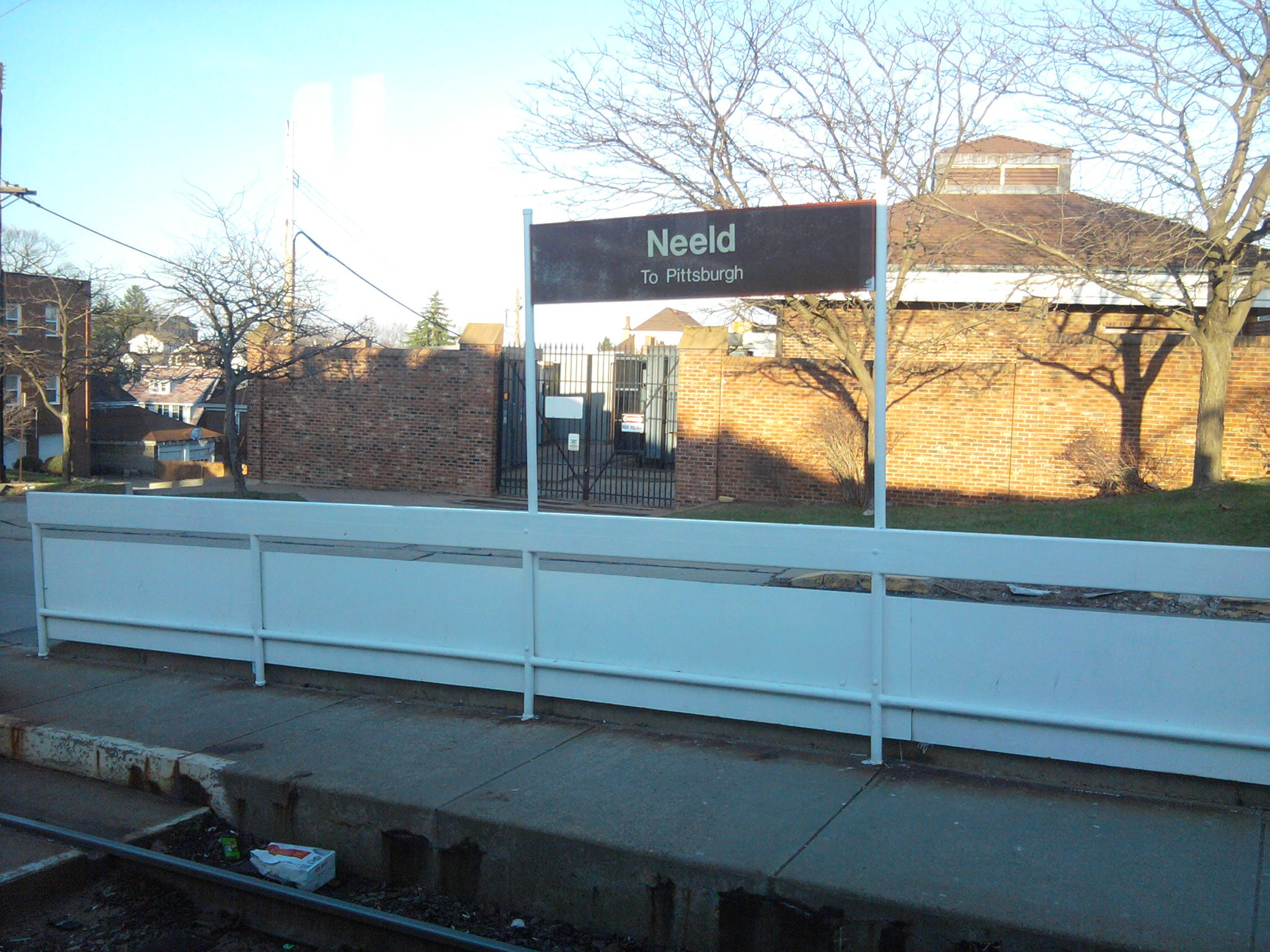

General information
- Location: Broadway Avenue and Neeld Avenue; Pittsburgh, Pennsylvania
- Coordinates: 40.4023°N 80.0311°W
- Owner: Port Authority
- Tracks: 2

History
- Opened: May 22, 1987
- Closed: June 25, 2012

Former services
Preceding station	Port Authority of Allegheny County	Following station
Shiras toward Allegheny	Red Line Overbrook Junction via Beechview	Stevenson toward Overbrook Junction or South Hills Village
Location

Neeld was a station on the Port Authority of Allegheny County's light rail network, located in the Beechview neighborhood of Pittsburgh, Pennsylvania. The street level stop was located on a small island platform in the middle of Broadway Avenue, through which the T travels along former streetcar tracks. The station served a densely populated residential area through which bus service is limited because of the hilly terrain.

Neeld was one of eleven stops closed on June 25, 2012 as part of a system-wide consolidation effort.

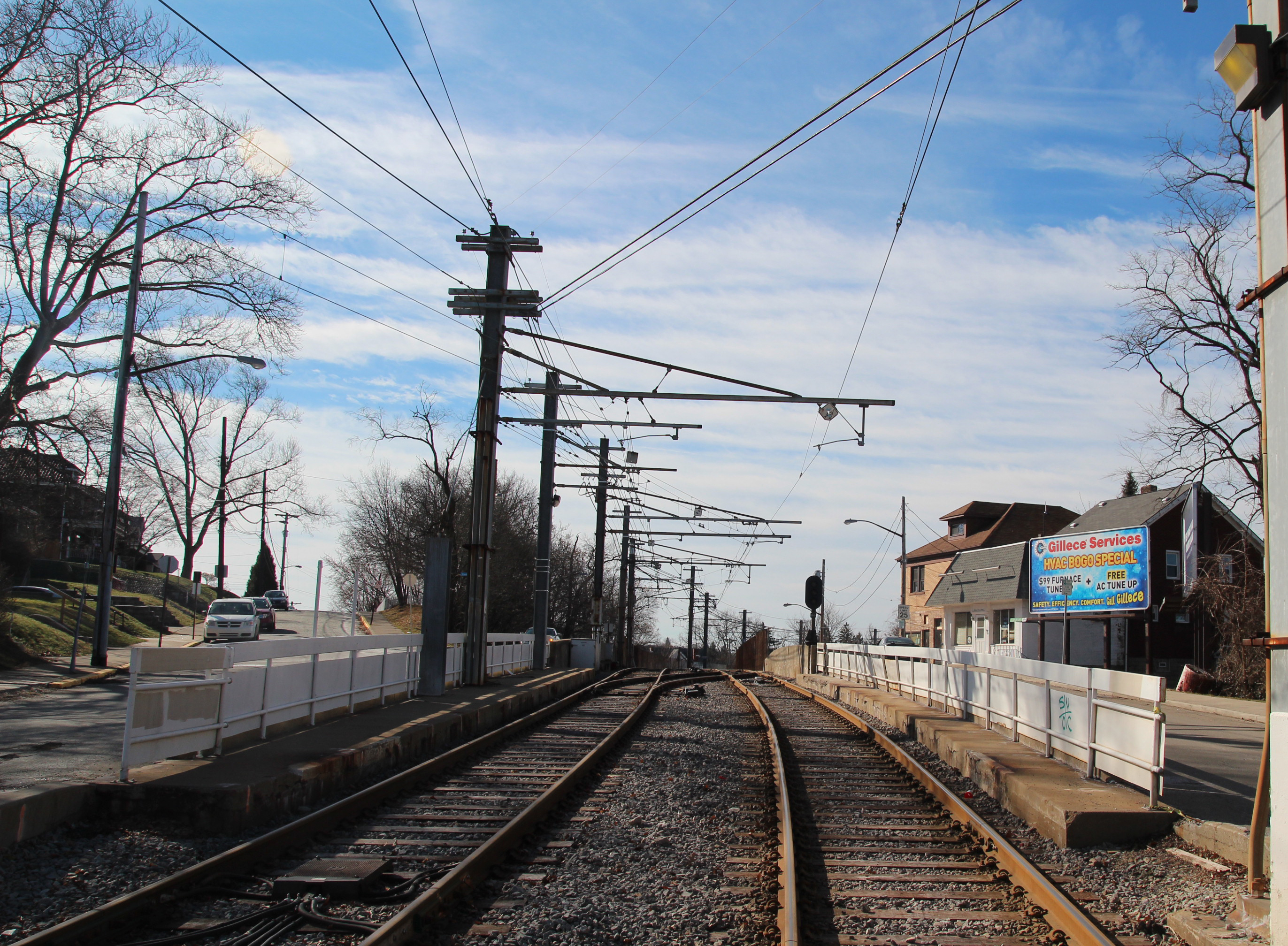
The station in 2017.

== History ==
The stop was the location of the turning loop of the Pittsburgh Railways 43 Neeld Avenue streetcar service.
