= Denis Theatre =

Movie theater in Mt. Lebanon, Pennsylvania, United States

- Denis Encore Theatres; Denis Quad Theatres
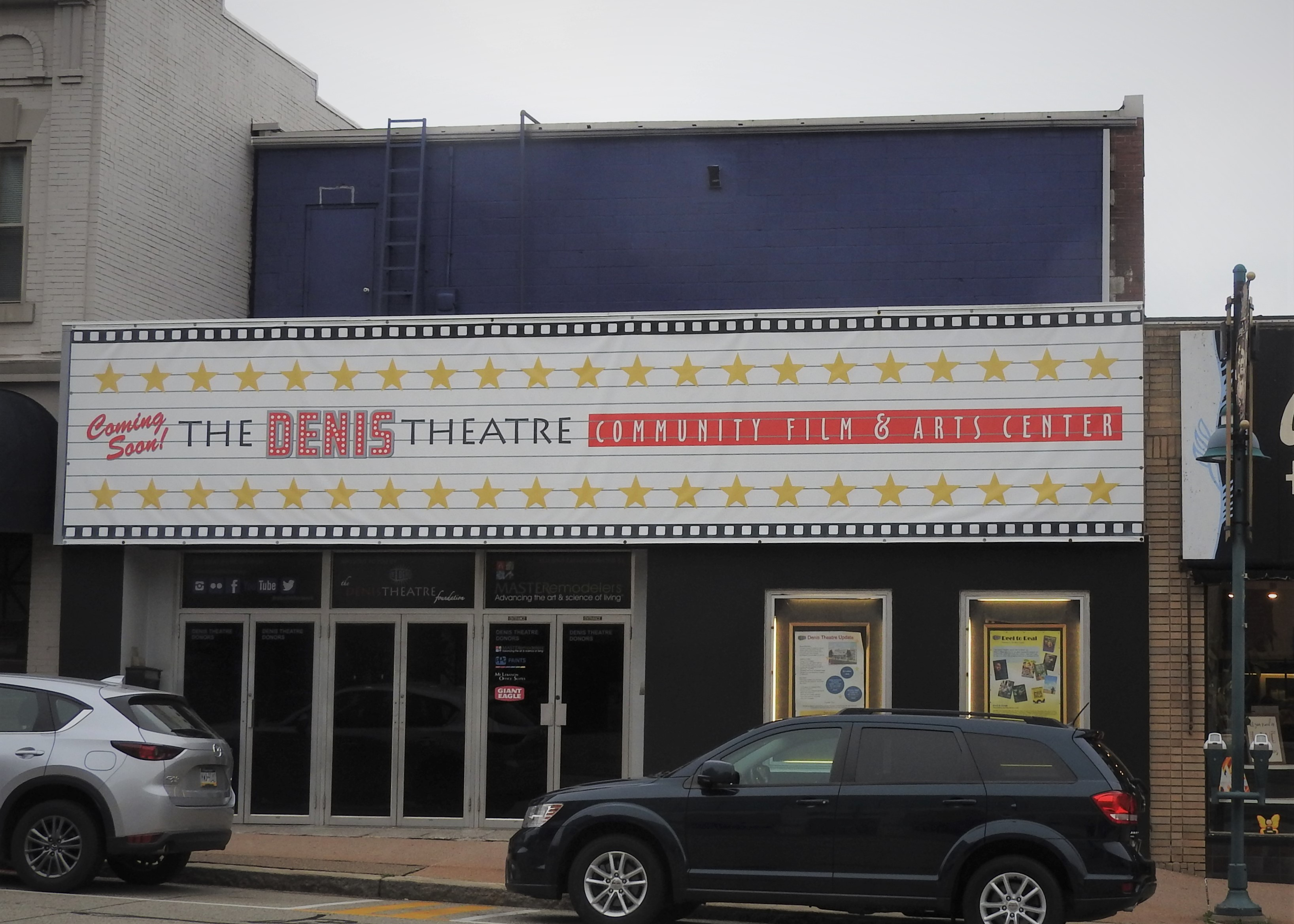

- Location within Pittsburgh
- Address: 685 Washington Road; Mt. Lebanon, Pennsylvania
- Coordinates: 40.38091°N 80.04419°W

Construction
- Closed: 2004
- Reopened: TBD
- Architect: Victor Rigaumont

Website
- http://www.denistheatre.org

The Denis Theatre is a historic movie theater in Mt. Lebanon, Pennsylvania. It was built in 1938 by John P. Harris of the Harris Amusement Company, and was in business until 2008. It is currently seeking funding to be renovated and reopened in the near future.

== History ==
Pennsylvania State Senator John P. Harris formed the Harris Amusement Company in the 1920s, opening 15 theaters throughout the mid-Atlantic states. After his death in 1926, Harris’ brother Denis Harris took over the Harris Amusement Company and formed the Denis Theatre in Mt. Lebanon, Pennsylvania. The $250,000 Functional-Moderne-style building was designed by architect Victor Rigaumont and erected in 114 days. Opening night was June 1, 1938. The Pittsburgh Press, reviewing the theater after attending the opening, was impressed by the theater's air conditioning system and its distinguished Carrara structural glass front. In 1960, the theater was sold to Ernest A. Stern, owner and president of Associated Theaters, along with several other theaters previously owned by Harris. In 1965, a second auditorium was built within the theater, opening as an art house, which was called the Encore Theatre

Associated Theaters was sold to Cinemette in 1974, but the latter company declared bankruptcy just four years later. Stern was able to regain possession of the theater, as well as several others he had sold, that same year. The Main Denis auditorium was “twinned” in 1981, with the main projection booth being relocated to the front of the balcony, and the remaining balcony became a small auditorium. At this time Denis had four screens. Associated Theaters was sold to Jeff Lewine of Cinema World in 1988, though Stern was able to retain ownership of the Denis building. Stern's son Richard gained ownership of the building after his father died, and in 1993 Stern grouped it with the local Manor and Bellevue theaters and formed CineMagic. Between 1994 and 2004, Stern's son formed a business partnership with Milo Ritton, who took possession of the Denis after their partnership dissolved. In 2007, the Denis was put on the market and purchased by D. Raja, a Mt. Lebanon entrepreneur. Subsequently, the Denis Theatre Foundation was formed as a non-profit organization. The Foundation signed a 15-year lease in 2008, with plans to renovate and reopen the theater. The Foundation purchased the theater outright in 2010.

== Vision and mission statement ==
Mission statement: The Denis Theatre enriches and educates the community through distinctive and engaging film and arts programming.

Vision for the New Denis Theatre: The Denis Theatre Foundation and its associates plan for the Denis Theatre to function primarily as an art house with two main theaters with capacities of two- and one-hundred seats and a smaller screening and lecture room which will seat up to forty people. As well as showing a variety of independent, foreign, and documentary-type films, the theater will act as a venue for film students, film festivals, a place to showcase regional and local art year-round and will house a lounge for patrons, several small meeting rooms, and a stage available to local bands and other small performance groups. The Denis Theatre Foundation plans to bring more jobs to the business district of Mt. Lebanon, Pennsylvania.

== Planning and construction ==
After buying the building for $668,750, the Denis Theatre Foundation outlined a plan to reopen the Denis Theatre on Monday, April 28, 2008. They estimated a total of $3 million to fund the project, which is currently up to $4.5 million.

In 2010, the Denis Theatre Foundation broke down the project into two phases. This first phase includes opening one screen, updating or replacing basic systems, and installing an elevator. The second phase of renovation includes opening two more screens, restoring the stage, and adding meeting rooms. For the first phase to be complete, an estimated $2.5 million will be needed.

After reviewing the plans, the foundation's board decided to make some modifications. The first phase will include renovating the first floor theaters and then adding a learning center/screening room so that more movies can be screened and events held. These changes cut the costs of renovation, as no elevator would be needed until a later phase of construction. In the meantime, the first floor will be accessible by ramp. The costs of the newly modified first phase add up to around $1.8 million. Balog Steines Hendricks & Manchester Architects Inc. of Youngstown, Ohio is the chosen architect for the renovation and NEXT Architecture of Pittsburgh has provided designs for the project. Construction began in October 2014.

== Fundraising and donations ==
In order to fund the renovations and construction, the Denis Theatre Foundation launched a series of capital campaigns ranging in goals, the most recent being $1 million, with an expected 2017 reopening. The first donors to contribute to the foundation were the D. Raja and his wife, Neeta, the owners who purchased the theatre in 2007 to prevent the building from being converted into an office complex. They gave a generous $5,000 back to the foundation after the Denis Theatre was bought. Other donations include a $100,000 grant from the Pittsburgh Foundation and an anonymous $155,000 challenge grant. In December 2015, the Foundation received an anonymous donation of $145,000 after reaching its year-end goal of raising $290,000. This triggered an additional $25,000 donation from the Lawrence and Rebecca Stern Family Foundation. A list of donors ranging in price from $100 to $100,000 and above is listed on the Denis Theatre Foundation website.

== Present use ==
While the Denis theatre currently serves under a 1-year, one million dollar revitalization plan, the foundation hosts programming in temporary locations in order to build community interest, including a film discussion series in spaces around the municipality and, as of fall 2014, a movie-focused art therapy program for senior citizens at the Mt. Lebanon Public Library. The Denis foundation's offices and apartment buildings' community rooms around Mt. Lebanon host “Reel to Real” discussions about eight times a year, where film buffs watch a movie and discuss it. Those screenings will eventually move to the main theater with discussions and refreshments in the learning center.
