= Mt. Lebanon, Pennsylvania =

Suburb of Pittsburgh, Pennsylvania

- Home rule municipality
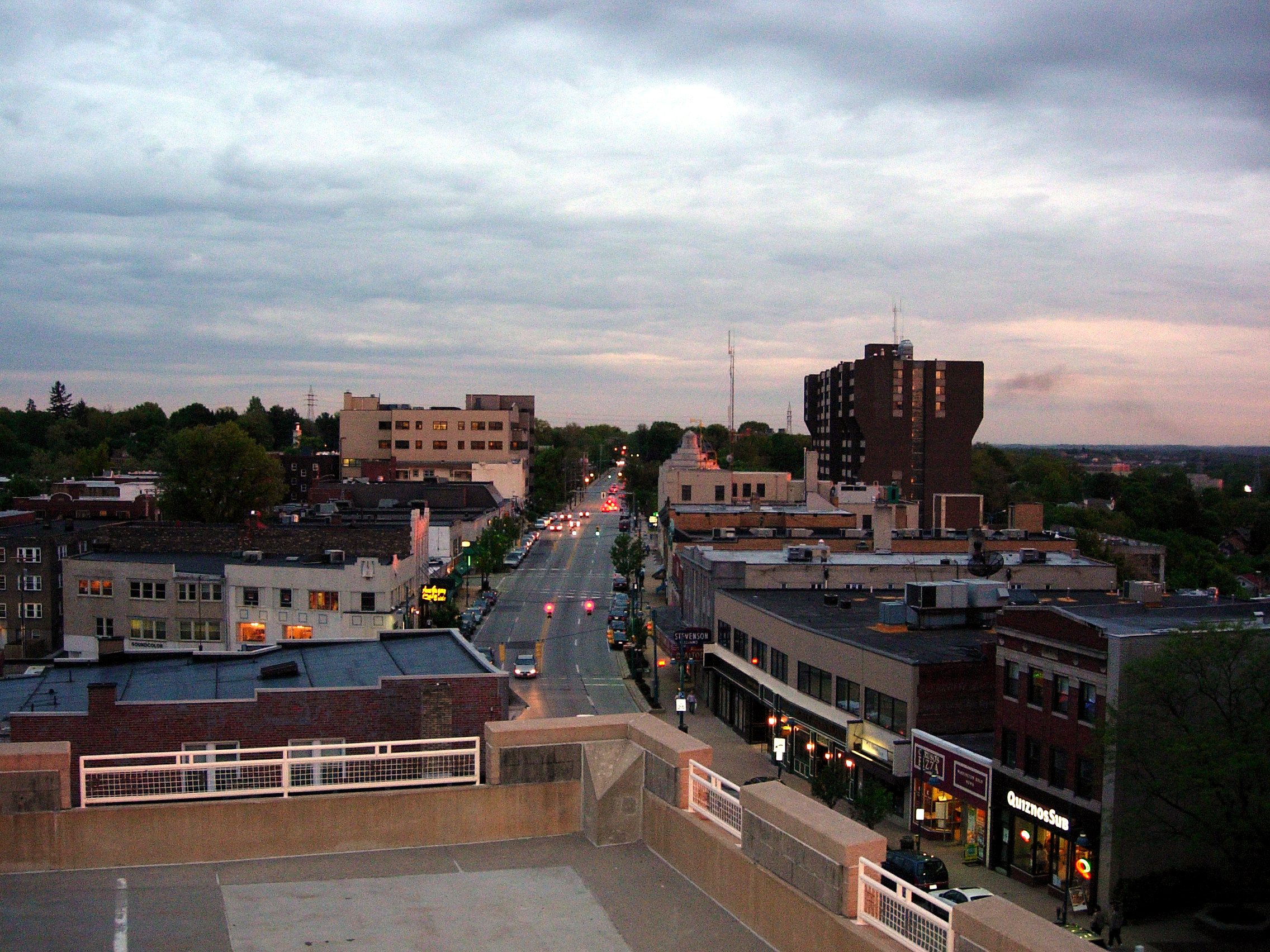
- Uptown Mt. Lebanon along Washington Road (Rt. 19 Truck)

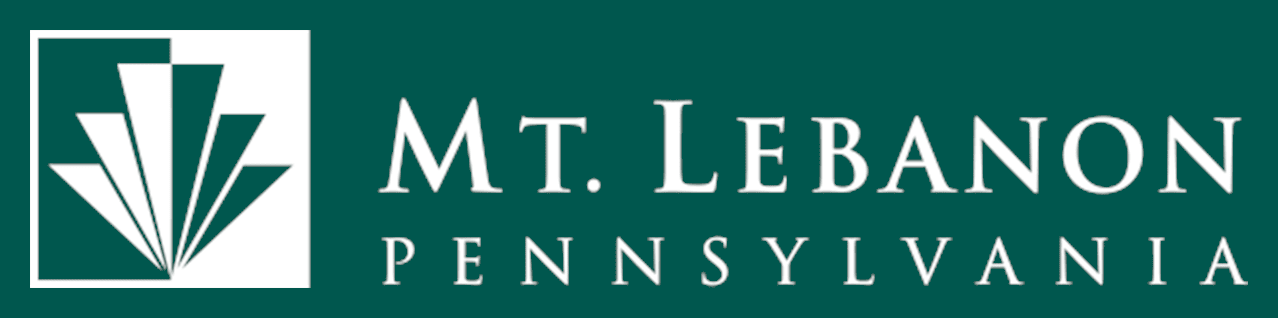
- Logo
- Nicknames: Lebo, Mt. Lebo, The Bubble
- Motto: "A Community with Character"
- Interactive map of Mt. Lebanon, Pennsylvania
- Location within Pennsylvania Location within the United States
- Coordinates: 40°22′30″N 80°3′0″W
- Country: United States
- State: Pennsylvania
- County: Allegheny
- Named for: Mount Lebanon (Jabal Lubnān in Lebanon)

Government
  - Body: Commission
  - President of Commission: Jeff Siegler (D)

Area
  - Total: 6.08 sq mi (15.75 km^{2})
  - Land: 6.08 sq mi (15.74 km^{2})
  - Water: 0.0039 sq mi (0.01 km^{2})

Population (2020)
  - Total: 34,075
  - Density: 5,603.4/sq mi (2,163.49/km^{2})
- Time zone: UTC-5 (EST)
  - Summer (DST): UTC-4 (EDT)
- ZIP code: 15216, 15226, 15228, 15234, 15243
- FIPS code: 42–003–51696
- Website: mtlebanon.org

Mt. Lebanon (locally /ˈlɛb.ə.nən/) is a township with home rule status in Allegheny County, Pennsylvania, United States. It is a first ring suburb of Pittsburgh located 4–6 miles (6–10 km) south of the city's downtown.

Originally established as a farming community, Mt. Lebanon became a streetcar suburb with the arrival of transit lines and a real estate subdivision in 1901, offering easy access to Downtown Pittsburgh. In 1912, Mount Lebanon was incorporated as a "First Class Township" under Pennsylvania state law. The 1924 opening of the Liberty Tunnel further improved automobile access. In 1975, it adopted one of Pennsylvania's first home rule charters. The town's original name was "Mount Lebanon". The 1975 home rule charter changed it to "Mt. Lebanon".

== History ==
The first European settlers arrived in 1773–1774, having purchased the land from the descendants of William Penn; other pioneers soon bought land from the state government.

Mount Lebanon, before incoporating in 1912, was part of Scott Township, which in turn traces its origins to the long-defunct St. Clair Township. Mount Lebanon was not named for two Cedar of Lebanon trees that were planted in 1850 on Washington Road near the top of Bower Hill Road, but was named after the area from which they came, Mount Lebanon, due to the similarities between the two landscapes. Prior to the incorporation of the township, the "Mount Lebanon" name was used for the area of Upper St. Clair Township near the cedar trees. In the 1880s, a post office located near the transplanted cedar trees was named "Mount Lebanon". Incorporators of neighboring Dormont Borough initially tried to use the "Mount Lebanon" name in 1909, but were opposed by residents of the future Mount Lebanon Township.

In 1928, Mount Lebanon became the first First Class township in Pennsylvania to adopt the council–manager form of government and has had an appointed manager serving as the chief administrative officer since that time.

Mount Lebanon was a farming community until the arrival of streetcar lines, the first line to Pittsburgh opening on July 1, 1901 followed by a second in 1924. After the arrival of the streetcar lines, which enabled daily commuting to and from Downtown Pittsburgh, Mount Lebanon became a streetcar suburb, with the first real estate subdivision being laid out in November 1901. Further, the opening of the Liberty Tubes in 1924 allowed easy automobile access to Pittsburgh. Between the 1920 and 1930 censuses, the township's population skyrocketed from 2,258 to 13,403. Today, Pittsburgh's mass transit agency, the Pittsburgh Regional Transit, or "PRT," operates a light rail system whose Red Line, which runs underneath Uptown Mt. Lebanon through the Mt. Lebanon Tunnel, merges with the Blue Line in Pittsburgh's Mount Washington section. Mt. Lebanon's only platform station, Mt. Lebanon Station, is in Uptown Mt. Lebanon; the adjacent Dormont Junction and Castle Shannon stations are in neighboring municipalities. And as of the census of 2020, there were 34,075 people living in Mt. Lebanon.

In 1971, Muhammad Ali attempted to purchase a home in Virginia Manor, a sub-division of Mt. Lebanon; it was thought that racial discrimination prevented him from doing so. However, the rejection was due to the anticipated publicity and crowds which would result from the sale of the property to Ali. In 1974, Ali would purchase a different Mt. Lebanon home, on Orchard Drive, for his aide, Horace Davis.

On May 21, 1974, the electorate approved a home rule charter, which took effect on January 1, 1975; as such, the community is no longer governed under the provisions of the Pennsylvania Township Code. Mount Lebanon became one of the first municipalities in Pennsylvania to adopt a home rule charter. In the charter, the official name of the municipality became Mt. Lebanon, Pennsylvania; the word "Mount" is abbreviated in all government documents, although the U.S. Postal Service continues to use "Mount."

== Geography ==
Mt. Lebanon is located at 40°22′30″N 80°3′0″W (40.375, -80.05). According to the United States Census Bureau, the township has a total area of 6.06 square miles (15.7 km^{2}), all land.

Mt. Lebanon is a suburb 4–6 miles (6–10 km) south of downtown Pittsburgh. There are two borders with Pittsburgh neighborhoods to the northeast (Brookline) and north (Banksville). The remainder of the northeast border is with the borough of Dormont. The entire western border is with Scott Township. On the southern border there are two municipalities, Upper St. Clair to the southwest and Bethel Park to the southeast. To the east is Castle Shannon, and finally, to the east-northeast is Baldwin Township (not to be confused with the Borough of Baldwin).

=== Commercial districts ===
Uptown Mt. Lebanon is the central business district and has Washington Rd. (U.S. Rt. 19 Truck) as its main thoroughfare.U.S. Rt. 19 Truck continues into Pittsburgh and back out into the city's northern suburbs and beyond). Uptown Mt. Lebanon is one of the more built up central business districts outside of Pittsburgh, featuring numerous coffee shops, small galleries, restaurants, and boutiques. The neighborhood is organized as The Uptown Mt. Lebanon Business and Professional Association. In total, Uptown Mt. Lebanon is home to 182 businesses and 72 storefronts.

Beverly Road is a prominent business district along the northern portion of Mt. Lebanon. The district runs along Beverly Road from Overlook Drive to Ralston Place. The street is home to many restaurants, lifestyle shops, gift shops, boutique fashion shops, and more.

=== Neighborhoods ===
Neighborhoods within Mt. Lebanon include Avondale, Beverly Heights, Carleton Manor, Cedarhurst, Clearview, Foxland, Highland Terrace, Hoodridge, Hoodridge Hilands, Lebanon Hills, McNeilly, Mission Hills, Old Virginia Manor, Parker Gardens, Seminole Hills, St. Clair Terrace, Sunset Hills, Twin Hills, Uptown, Virginia Manor, Washington Park, Willow Terrace, and Woodridge.

Virginia Manor is a subdivision with streets designed to follow the natural contours of the land. Future Governor James H. Duff helped found Virginia Manor in 1929.

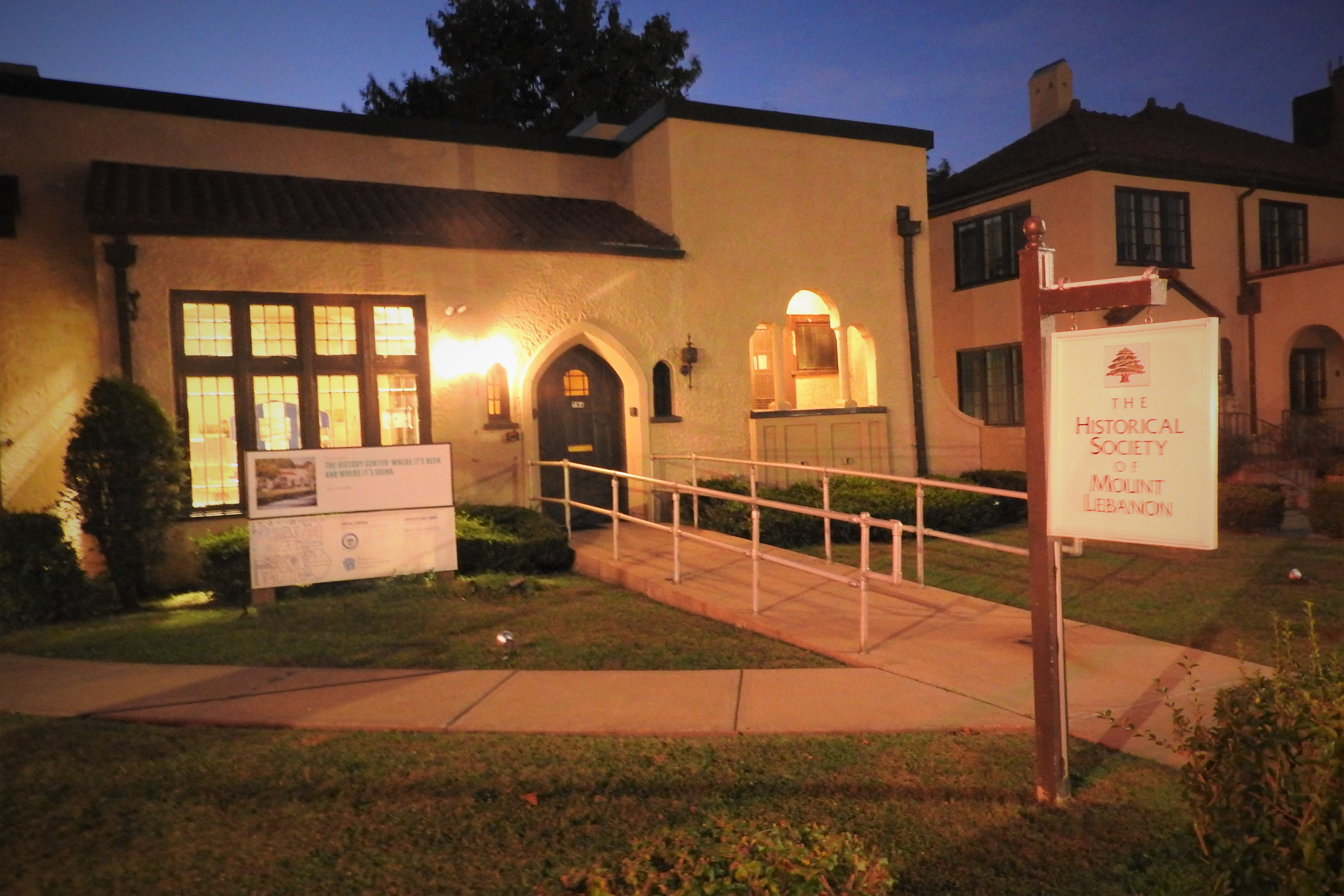
Historical Society

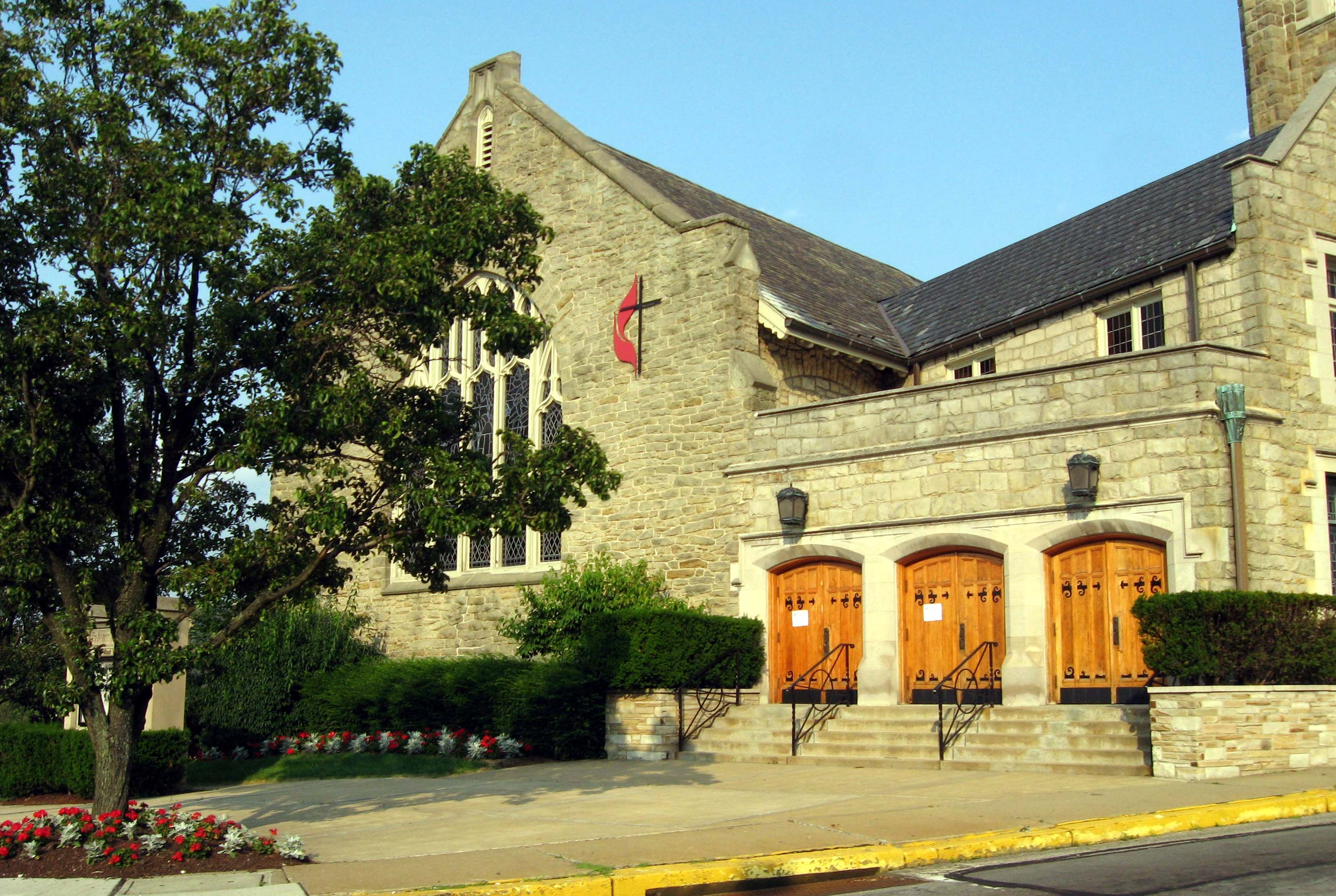
Mt Lebanon United Methodist Church

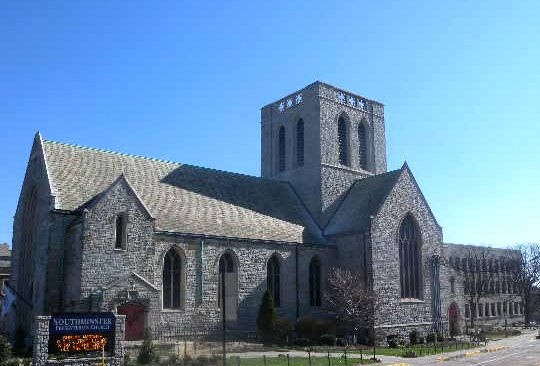
Southminster Presbyterian Church

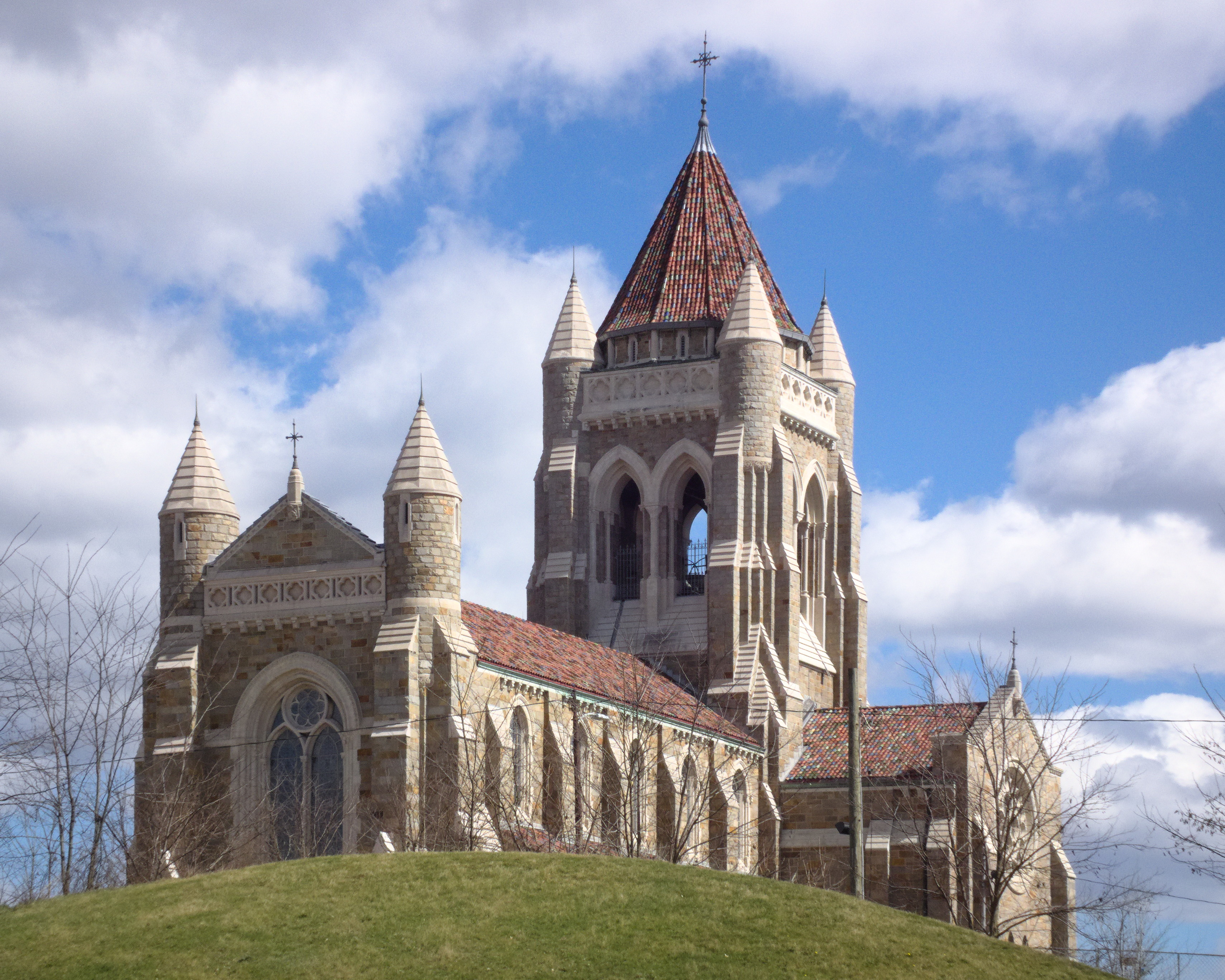
St. Bernard's Catholic Church

== Demographics ==
Historical population
Census	Pop.	Note	%±
1920	2,258		—
1930	13,403		493.6%
1940	19,571		46.0%
1950	26,604		35.9%
1960	35,361		32.9%
1970	39,157		10.7%
1980	34,414		−12.1%
1990	33,362		−3.1%
2000	33,017		−1.0%
2010	33,137		0.4%
2020	34,075		2.8%
2026 (est.)	32,605		−4.3%

As of the census of 2020, the racial makeup of the township was 87.15% White, 1.46% Black, 0.09% Native American, 4.59% Asian, 0.02% Pacific Islander, 0.84% from other races, and 5.85% from two or more races. Hispanic or Latino of any race were 3.32% of the population.

In the township the population was spread out, with 24.9% under the age of 18, 3.6% were 18 to 24, 23.1% were 25 to 44, 27.1% were 45 to 64, and 21.3% were 65 years of age or older. For every 100 females, there were 94.2 males. For every 100 females age 18 and over, there were 89.2 males.

As of 2025, the median income for a household was $166,904. Married families had a median income of $169,482. The mean household income for married families was $207,467, while the mean income for overall households was $166,904. Non-family households had a median income of $53,048 and a mean income of $80,803.

== Arts and culture ==
- Mt. Lebanon Historic District
- U.S. National Register of Historic Places
- U.S. Historic district
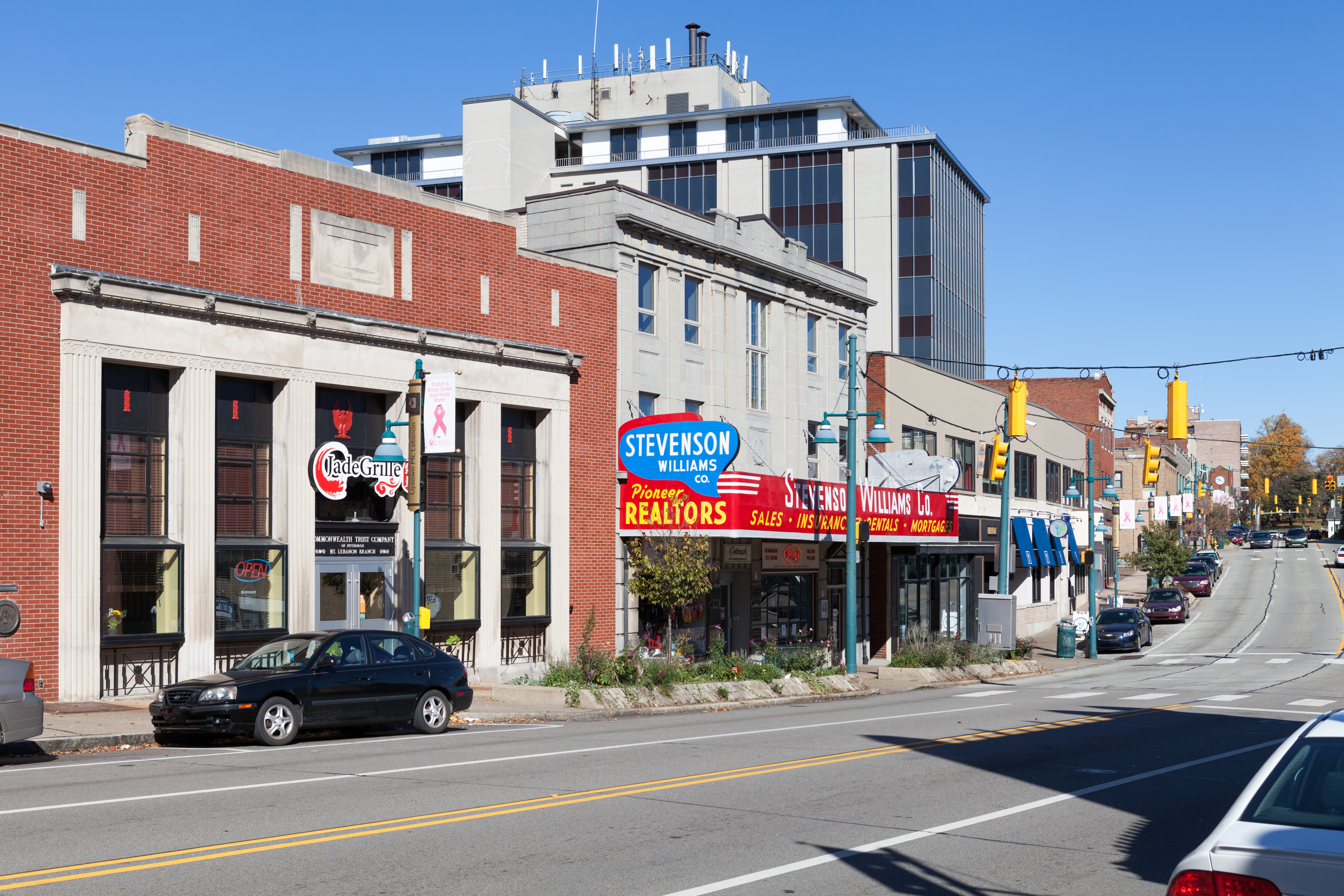
- Washington Road at Alfred Street

- Location within Pennsylvania

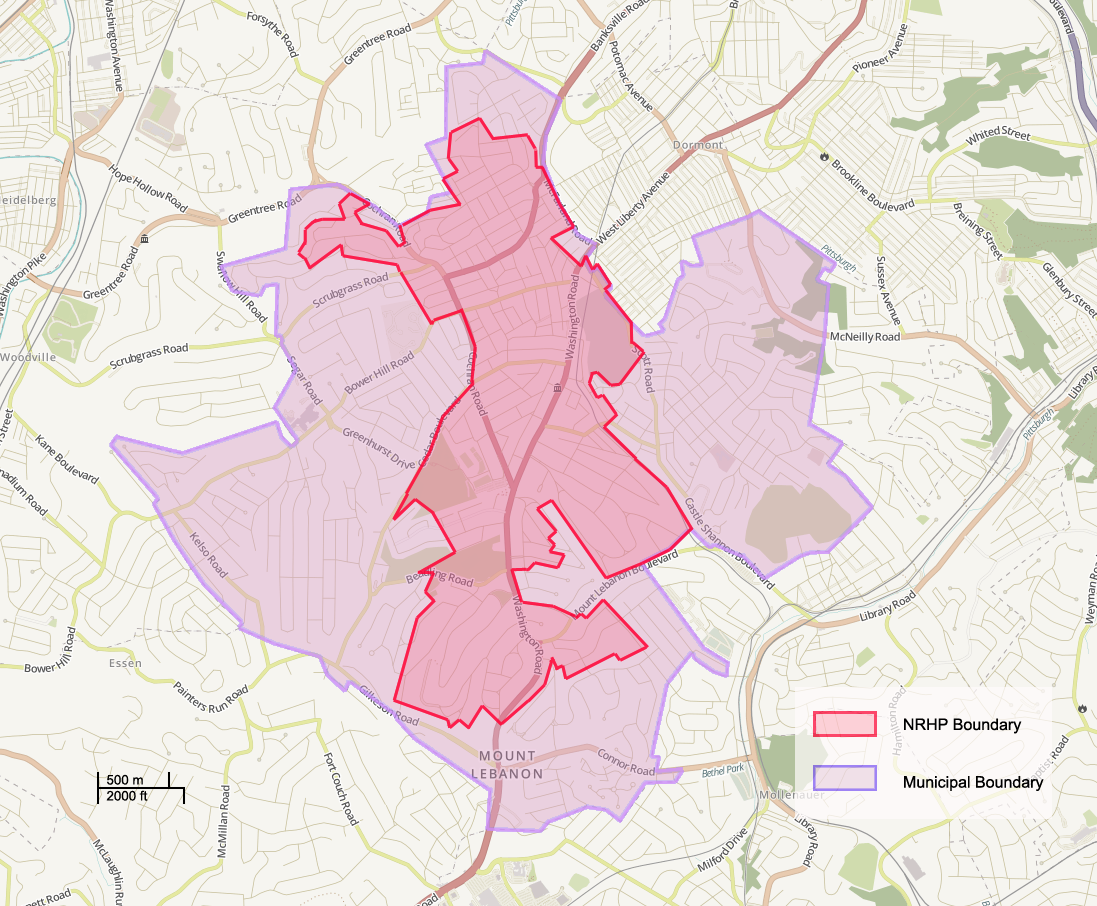
- Area: 1,306.0 acres (528.5 ha)
- Built: 1874–1945
- NRHP reference No.: 14000813
- Added to NRHP: September 30, 2014

A large portion of Mt. Lebanon is listed as the Mt. Lebanon Historic District on the National Register of Historic Places. The district contains 3,341 contributing buildings and 21 contributing sites. Most of the buildings are residential, though two commercial areas are included. The district is a significant example of the transition from a rural agricultural area to a suburb made possible first by the trolley/streetcar, c. 1901, and later by the automobile in the 1920s and 1930s with the opening of the Liberty Tubes in 1924. The boundaries of the district include those areas that were developed between 1874 and c. 1945.

Neighborhoods such as Virginia Manor, Hoodridge, Mission Hills and Seminole Hills contain homes built by some of the most distinguished Pittsburgh architects. Some of the common architectural styles in Mt. Lebanon include Foursquare, Tudor, French Provincial, Colonial Revival, Bungalow, Italian Renaissance, Art Moderne, Art Deco, and Spanish Mission.

== Parks and recreation ==
Mt. Lebanon provides many recreational opportunities for its residents. Fifteen parks are scattered over 200 acres (0.81 km^{2}) throughout the community. In addition to the parks, there is an Olympic-size swimming pool, open in summer, and a regulation-size ice rink and recreation building located adjacent to Mt. Lebanon Park. Mt. Lebanon also boasts one of the oldest public golf courses in western Pennsylvania and has several tennis and basketball courts, which are open year-round. Other recreational facilities include a Sand volleyball court, bocce courts, platform tennis, a plethora of picnic pavilions and over eight children's playgrounds.

Mt. Lebanon School District's sports teams are a big part of the community. The mascot is the Blue Devil, which has occasionally stirred controversy.

== Government and politics ==
Presidential Elections Results
Year	Republican	Democratic	Third Parties
2024	31% 6,862	68% 15,268	2% 348
2020	32% 7,146	67% 15,164	1% 315
2016	36% 6,856	63% 12,235	1% 219
2012	46% 8,940	53% 10,426	1% 197
2008	45% 9,041	54% 11,019	1% 216

Congressman Chris Deluzio represents the area in the United States House of Representatives as a part of Pennsylvania's 17th congressional district. Mt. Lebanon is in District 42 of the Pennsylvania Senate and is represented by Wayne Fontana. Mt. Lebanon is in District 42 of the Pennsylvania House of Representatives and is represented by Mt. Lebanon resident Dan Miller.

The Mt. Lebanon government takes the form of a commission, made up of 5 commissioners - one from each of Mt. Lebanon's 5 wards.

== Education ==
The Mt. Lebanon School District has seven elementary schools, two middle schools and one high school: Mt. Lebanon High School. The Mt. Lebanon School District is a walking school district, meaning there is no provided school bus transportation to schools for students.

Keystone Oaks High School is physically located in Mt. Lebanon but serves the adjacent communities of Greentree, Dormont and Castle Shannon. Seton-La Salle Catholic High School, the South Hills Catholic Academy, and Ave Maria Academy are prominent Pittsburgh Diocese Catholic schools located in Mt. Lebanon.

The Mt. Lebanon Public Library, founded in 1932, is funded almost entirely by the municipality and county. It houses over 140,000 books, seats for 165 persons, and more than 50 public computers.

== Transportation ==
Mt. Lebanon is served by the Pittsburgh Light Rail system, with Mt. Lebanon station and Poplar station located along the Red Line. The Mt. Lebanon Tunnel connects Mt. Lebanon station to Dormont. Castle Shannon station and Dormont Junction station are located along the Mt. Lebanon borders and inside the adjacent boroughs of Castle Shannon and Dormont.

== In popular culture ==
Mt. Lebanon has been used as a filming location for various films and television productions and is often seen by directors as a highly sought after backdrop for both Hollywood productions and independent films.

Episodic television shows such as CBS 60 minutes, Mister Rogers' Neighborhood, and Daniel Tiger's Neighborhood, have also been filmed in Mt. Lebanon.

Movies or Television Productions Filmed in Mt. Lebanon
Movie or TV Production	Year released	Starring
Gung Ho	1986	Michael Keaton
Bob Roberts	1992	Jack Black, Alan Rickman, and John Cusack
The Temptations	1998	Charles Malik Whitfield, D. B. Woodside, and Terron Brooks
Dogma	1999	Ben Affleck, Matt Damon, Salma Hayek, Alan Rickman, Chris Rock, and George Carlin
Graduation	2007	Chris Lowell and Shannon Lucio
Abduction	2011	Taylor Lautner and Lily Collins
The Perks of Being a Wallflower	2012	Logan Lerman and Emma Watson
The Fault in Our Stars	2014	Shailene Woodley, Ansel Elgort, Nat Wolf, and Willem Dafoe
Hollidaysburg	2014	Rachel Keller
Concussion	2015	Will Smith and Alec Baldwin
Love the Coopers	2015	Diane Keaton, Jake Lacy, Amanda Seyfried, Timothée Chalamet, and Olivia Wilde
Manhunt: Deadly Games	2017	Sam Worthington, Paul Bettany, and Jeremy Bobb
Mindhunter	2017	Jonathan Groff, Holt McCallany, and Anna Torv
A Beautiful Day in the Neighborhood	2019	Tom Hanks and Matthew Rhys
Sweet Girl	2021	Jason Momoa and Isabela Merced
Anything's Possible	2022	Billy Porter (director) and Eva Reign

== Notable people ==
Notable people from Mt. Lebanon include figures in business, politics, entertainment, education, and athletics.

== See also ==
- Denis Theatre
- Mt. Lebanon Historic District
- Mt. Lebanon station
- Mt. Lebanon Tunnel
- List of street car suburbs in the United States
- Poplar Station
