= Stevenson station =

Light rail station in Dormont, Pennsylvania, USA

Stevenson
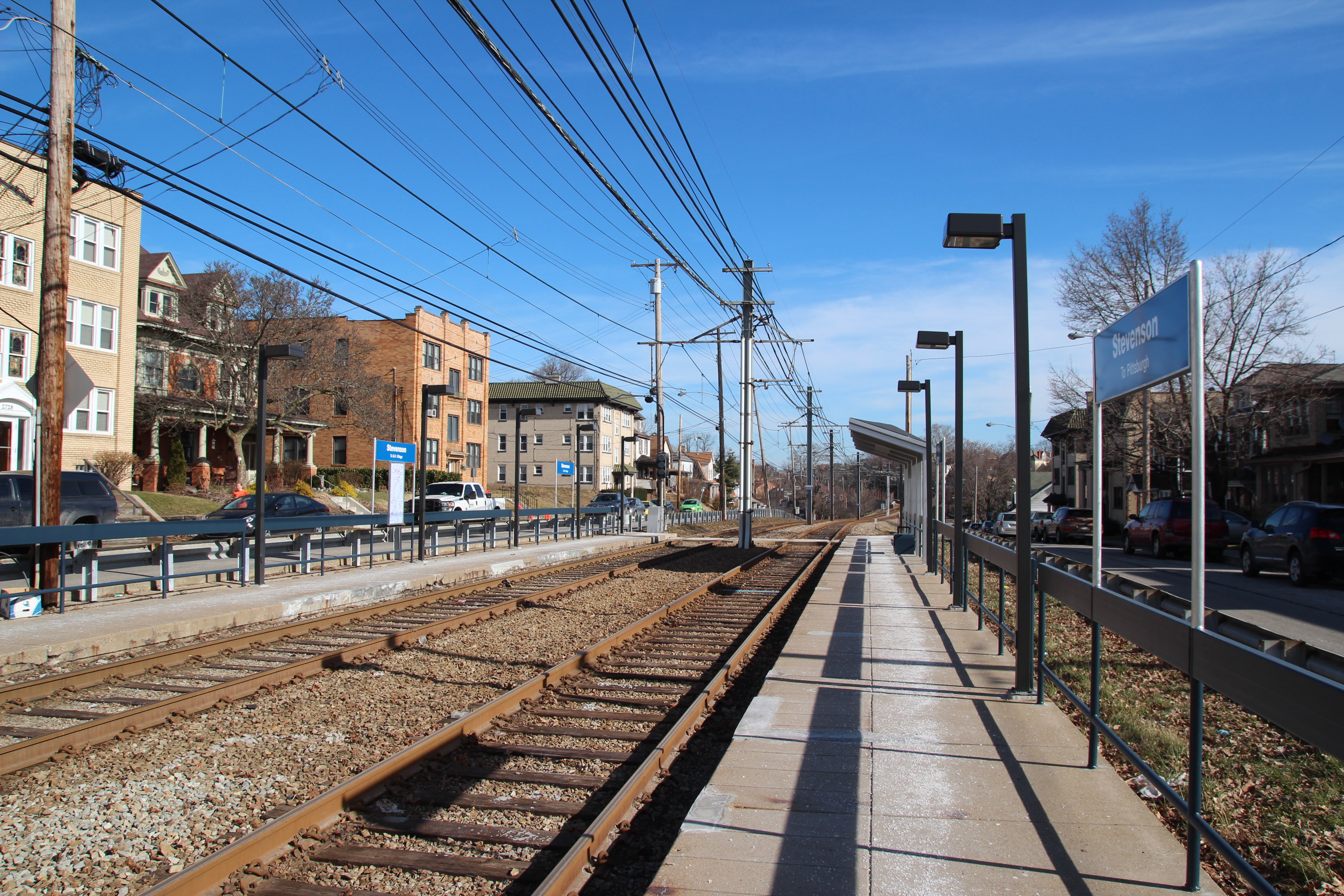
- Looking north

General information
- Location: Broadway Avenue, between LaSalle, Edgehill and Ordinance avenues Dormont, Pennsylvania
- Coordinates: 40.3994°N 80.0338°W
- Owner: Pittsburgh Regional Transit
- Platforms: 2 side platforms
- Tracks: 2

Construction
- Accessible: No, under construction

History
- Opened: May 22, 1987

Passengers
- 2018: 117 (weekday boardings)

Services
Preceding station	Pittsburgh Regional Transit	Following station
Shiras toward Allegheny	Red Line	Potomac toward South Hills Village
Former services
Preceding station	Port Authority of Allegheny County	Following station
Neeld Closed 2012 toward Allegheny	Red Line Overbrook Junction via Beechview	Potomac toward Overbrook Junction or South Hills Village
Location

Stevenson station is a station on Pittsburgh Regional Transit's light rail network, located in Dormont, Pennsylvania. The street level stop is located in a highly populated residential area that features many medium density multi-unit facilities. It serves commuters within walking distance, providing access toward Downtown Pittsburgh or South Hills Village.

In May 2024, the Federal Transit Administration awarded Pittsburgh Regional Transit $8 million to construct accessible platforms at ten Red Line stops, including Stevenson.
