= Streetcar suburb =

Residential community developed by streetcar lines

A streetcar suburb is a residential community in the United States or Canada whose growth and development was strongly shaped by the use of streetcar lines as a primary means of transportation. Such suburbs developed in the years before the automobile, when the introduction of the electric trolley or streetcar allowed the burgeoning middle class to move beyond the central city's borders. Early suburbs were served by horsecars, but by the late 19th century, cable cars and electric streetcars, or trams, were used, allowing residences to be built farther away from the urban core of a city. Streetcar suburbs, usually called additions or extensions at the time, were the forerunner of today's suburbs in the United States and Canada. San Francisco's Western Addition is an example of streetcar suburbs before westward and southward expansion occurred.

Although most closely associated with the electric streetcar, the term can be used for any suburb originally built with streetcar-based transit in mind, thus some streetcar suburbs date from the early 19th century. As such, the term is general and one development called a streetcar suburb may vary greatly from others. However, some concepts are generally present in streetcar suburbs, such as straight (often gridiron) street plans and relatively narrow lots.

== Similar terms ==
=== Railroad suburbs ===
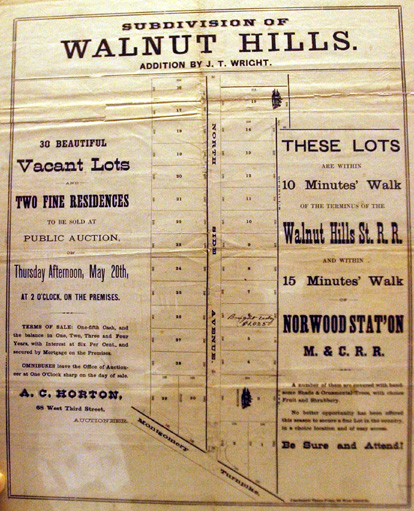
Advertisement for a subdivision in Cincinnati, Ohio, touting the short walk to nearby rail stations

By 1830, many New York City area commuters were going to work in Manhattan from what are now the boroughs of Brooklyn and Queens, which were not part of New York City at that time. They commuted by ferries. In 1852, architect Alexander Jackson Davis designed Llewellyn Park in New Jersey, a planned suburb served by both ferry and steam railroad. In the 1840s and 1850s, new railroad lines fostered the development of such New York City suburbs as Yonkers, White Plains, and New Rochelle. The steam locomotive in the mid 19th century provided the wealthy with the means to live in bucolic surroundings, to socialize in country clubs and still commute to work downtown. These suburbs were what historian Kenneth T. Jackson called the "railroad suburbs" and historian Robert Fishman called a "bourgeois utopia".

Outside of Philadelphia, suburbs like Radnor, Bryn Mawr, and Villanova developed along the Philadelphia Main Line. As early as 1850, 83 commuter stations had been built within a 15-mile radius of Boston. Chicago saw huge developments, with 11 separate lines serving over 100 communities by 1873. A famous community served was Riverside, Illinois, arguably one of the first planned communities in the United States, designed in 1869 by Frederick Law Olmsted.

=== Horsecar and cable car suburbs ===
The suburbs closest to the city were often based on horsecars and eventually cable cars. Introduced in America around 1830, the horse-drawn omnibus was the first mass transit system, offering regularly scheduled stops along a fixed route, allowing passengers to travel three miles sitting down in the time it would take them to walk two miles. Later, more efficient horse-drawn streetcars allowed cities to expand to areas even more distant. By 1860, they operated in most major American and Canadian cities, including New York, Baltimore, Philadelphia, Chicago, Cincinnati, Saint Louis, Montreal, and Boston.

Horsecar suburbs emanated from the city center towards the more distant railroad suburbs. For the first time, transportation began to separate social and economic classes in cities, as the working and middle class continued to live in areas closer to the city center, while the rich could afford to live farther out.

== History ==
=== Development ===
The introduction of the electrical streetcar in Richmond, Virginia, in 1887 by Frank J. Sprague marked the start of a new era of transportation-influenced suburbanization through the birth of the "streetcar suburb". The early trolley allowed people to effortlessly travel in 10 minutes what they could walk in 30, and was rapidly introduced in cities like Boston and Los Angeles, and eventually to all larger American and Canadian cities. There were 5,783 miles of streetcar track serving American cities in 1890; this grew to 22,000 by 1902 and 34,404 by 1907.

By 1890, electric streetcar lines were replacing horse-drawn ones in cities of all sizes, allowing the lines to be extended and fostering a tremendous amount of suburban development. They were often extended out to formerly rural communities, which experienced an initial surge of development, and then new residential corridors were created along the newly built lines leading to what had sometimes been separate communities. On side streets, the houses closest to the original streetcar line are often as much as ten to twenty years older than houses built farther down the street, reflecting the initial surge and slow completion of a development.

Because streetcar operators offered low fares and free transfers, commuting was finally affordable to nearly everyone. Combined with the relatively cheap cost of land farther from the city, streetcar suburbs were able to attract a broad mix of people from all socioeconomic classes, although they were most popular by far with the middle class.

The houses in a streetcar suburb were generally narrow in width compared to later homes, and Arts and Crafts movement styles like the California Bungalow and American Foursquare were most popular. These houses were typically purchased by catalog and many of the materials arrived by railcar, with some local touches added as the house was assembled. The earliest streetcar suburbs sometimes had more ornate styles, including late Victorian and Stick. The houses of streetcar suburbs, whatever the style, tended to have prominent front porches, while driveways and built-in garages were rare, reflecting the pedestrian-focused nature of the streets when the houses were initially built. Setbacks between houses were not nearly as small as in older neighborhoods (where they were sometimes nonexistent), but houses were still typically built on lots no wider than 30 to 40 feet.

Shops such as groceries, bakeries, and drug stores were usually built near the intersection of streetcar lines, or directly along more heavily traveled routes (otherwise, routes would simply be lined with houses similar to those found in the surrounding neighborhoods). These shops would sometimes be multi-story buildings, with apartments on the upper floors. These provided convenient shopping for household supplies for the surrounding neighborhoods, which could potentially be visited on one's way to or from work. While there were stores near houses, they were not quite as close as in older parts of cities, and they were usually confined to specific streets, representing the beginning of a complete separation between residential and commercial areas in cities.

Unlike railroad suburbs, which tended to form in pockets around stations along the interurban line, streetcar suburbs formed continuous corridors stretching outwards from city cores. The streetcar lines themselves were either built on roads that conformed to the grid, or on former turnpikes radiating in all directions from the city, sometimes giving such cities a roughly star-like appearance on maps. Along the lines, developers built rectangular "additions" with homes, usually on small lots, within a five- to ten-minute walk of the streetcar. These were essentially built on the grid plan of the older central cities, and typically spread out in between streetcar lines throughout a city.

=== Decline ===
Streetcar use continued to increase until 1923 when patronage reached 15.7 billion, but it declined in every year after that as automobile use increased amongst the middle and upper classes. By the 1930s, the once-profitable streetcar companies were diversifying by adding motorized buses and trackless trolleys to their fleets. By the 1940s, streetcar ridership had dropped dramatically, and few subdivisions were being built with streetcars or mass transit in general in mind. By the 1950s, nearly all streetcar lines had stopped running, and were instead served by buses. Compared to the streetcars, which were the primary method of transport at their peak and ran very frequent service, the replacement buses tended to be much less frequent and reliable.

In the second half of the 20th century, streetcar suburbs in many American cities suffered serious deterioration. The home ownership boom facilitated by the Federal Housing Administration excluded neighborhoods which received negative reviews from FHA and bank officials in the underwriting process. FHA standards at the time discouraged many design features common in streetcar suburbs; small lots, narrow streets, semi-detached housing, lack of off-street parking, and mixing single-family houses with apartment or commercial buildings were all viewed negatively in FHA reports. This meant that streetcar suburbs were very frequently redlined. Without streetcar services, and lacking adequate space and infrastructure for residents to keep private automobiles, these neighborhoods were considered obsolete and were a frequent target of Urban renewal programs. The West End in Cincinnati, Bronzeville, Chicago, and West Philadelphia were all typical streetcar suburbs which were partially or completely demolished as part of postwar urban renewal programs.

=== Modern streetcar suburbs ===
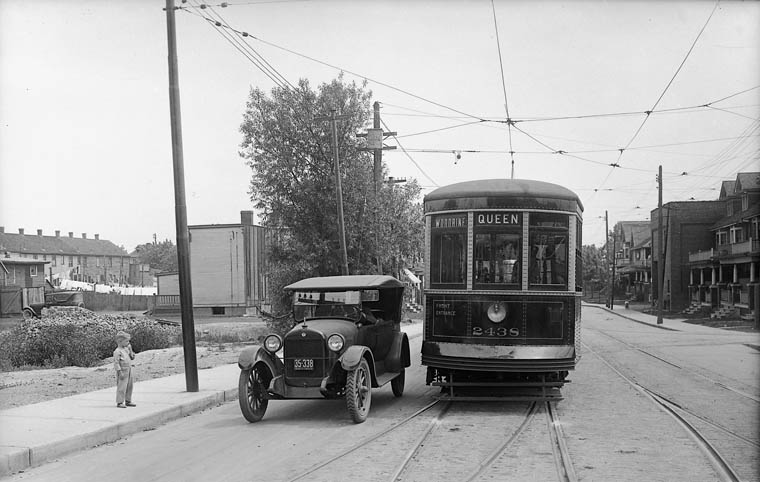
A Toronto streetcar on Queen Street East in 1923 serving streetcar suburbs such as Riverdale and The Beaches.

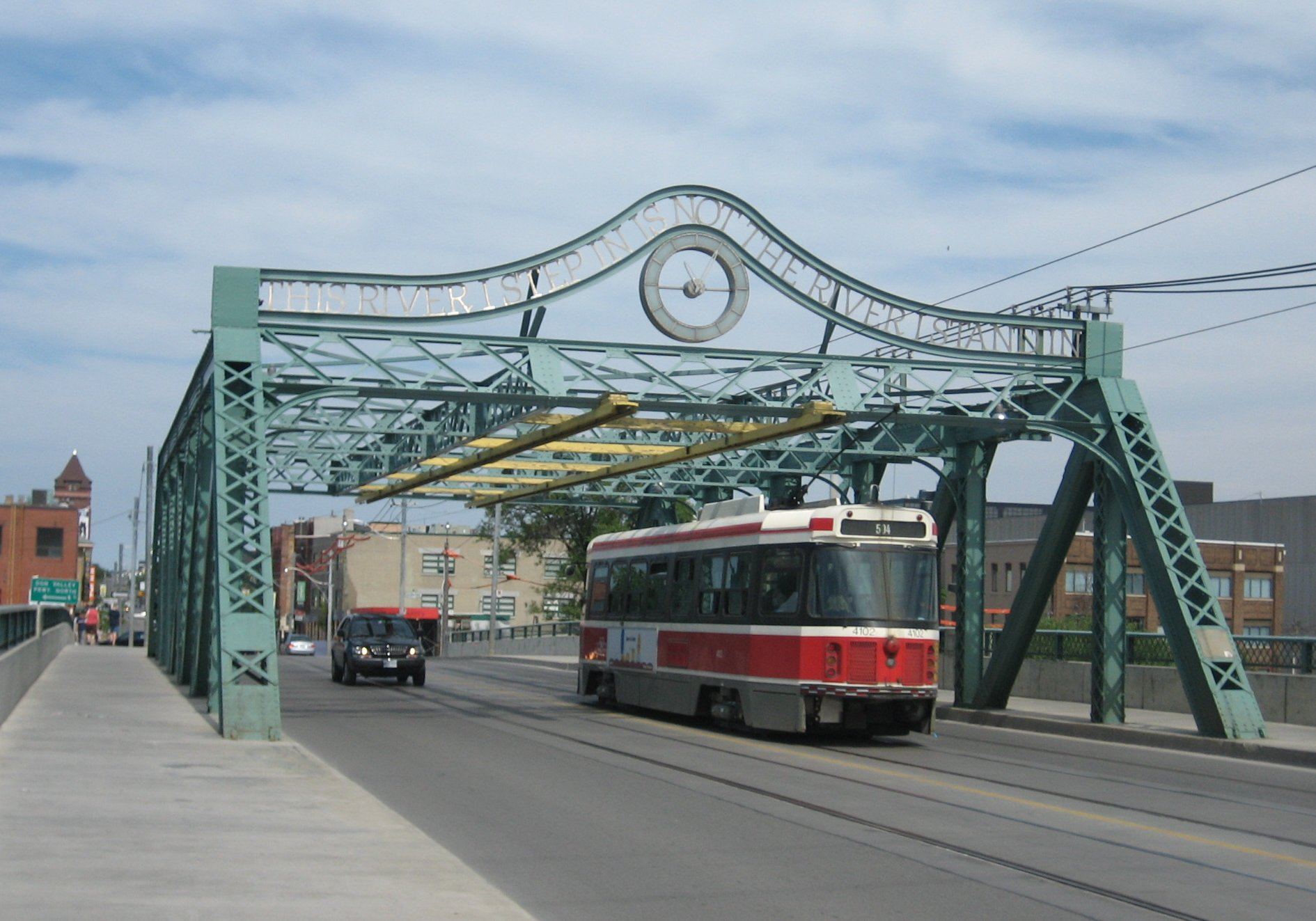
A Toronto streetcar in 2007 serving the same areas.

Though many now appear urban, former streetcar suburbs remain recognizable by the neighborhood structures along and near their routes. Small commercial establishments and storefronts can be seen every few blocks or, in better-preserved neighborhoods, along the route's entire length. These small stores—often groceries—are usually flush with the sidewalk, and they were run by "mom and pop" operators who lived in quarters behind or above the establishment. Off-street parking, where it exists, is located in the rear of a building.

Because stores were originally built along streetcar lines, a person could exit the transport near home, do some light shopping for dinner items, and continue by walking to their residence. These buildings also provided shopping for a non-employed spouse. Very few small groceries remain (outside of dense cities), though the space is often now used for non-foodstuff retail, capable of drawing clients from outside of the immediate neighborhood.

Modern streetcar suburbs are usually served by buses which run roughly the original streetcar routes, and may offer highly reasonable mass transit commute times to downtowns and other business areas, especially compared to later automobile suburbs. Toronto, Ontario, Canada is an example of a city in which most streetcar suburbs are still served by streetcars.

House prices in streetcar suburbs vary by neighborhood and city. Lots left empty in these areas during initial development, or where the initial houses have burned or been torn down, are usually too narrow for modern residential zoning regulations, meaning that it is difficult to infill housing in well-preserved streetcar suburbs. Occasionally two lots are combined into one for a wide enough lot, or many houses are torn down for a new use as needed. However, in some cases where historic zoning applies, infill housing is encouraged or required to match neighboring housing standards.

== List of streetcar suburbs in North America ==
=== Atlanta ===
- Inman Park is listed on the National Register of Historic Places and became Atlanta's first streetcar suburb in 1889. The trolley line is gone, but the trolley barn is still standing and has been renovated

=== Berkeley, California ===
- The Elmwood District in Berkeley, California, was located in open land away from the city. It was eventually integrated into the East Bay metropolis by decades of urban expansion and infill development.

=== Boston ===
- Brighton became a streetcar suburb when transit lines were laid in 1889.
- Somerville was studied with respect to the social mobility in streetcar suburbs.

=== Edmonton ===
- Alberta Avenue began development in the 1890s before the arrival of the Edmonton Radial Railway, however much of the neighbourhood's development occurred after the streetcar's introduction on 95th Street.
- Central McDougall is bisected by 107th Avenue, which remained a streetcar route until the system's closure, and by then most of the neighbourhood had been developed.
- Highlands was initially isolated from Edmonton's developed area in the early 1900s, however developers negotiated with the city to extend the electric streetcar line, which made development in an otherwise isolated area possible. Much of the neighbourhood developed upon the Streetcar's introduction along 112th Avenue.
- McCauley had been largely subdivided by 1892 upon Edmonton's incorporation as a town, however little development occurred until 1912, when multiple streetcar services ran through the heart of McCauley on 97th and 95th Streets.
- Westmount developed early due to its proximity to downtown Edmonton, with access further enhanced by the extension of the streetcar in 1910 and commercial space developed along 124th Street along the line.
- Wîhkwêntôwin (formerly Oliver) was initially disconnected from the remaining town of Edmonton. Development was accelerated by the introduction of streetcar service in 1908 along Jasper Avenue.

=== Indianapolis ===
- Irvington, founded in 1870 five miles (8 km) east of downtown Indianapolis, prospered as a streetcar suburb in the 1890s, leading to Indianapolis annexing the community in 1902.
- Riverside, founded in 1902 three-and-a-half miles (5.6 km) northwest of downtown Indianapolis, was developed in the style of the City Beautiful movement with tree-lined streets, landscaped medians/traffic circles, generous setbacks, and glacier boulder retaining walls.

=== Jacksonville, Florida ===
- The combined Riverside and Avondale neighborhoods were served by streetcar lines starting in 1887 until the 1930s, with ridership peaking at over 13 million riders in 1913.

=== Knoxville, Tennessee ===
- Oakwood, Knoxville, was studied as an example of a working-class, as opposed to middle-class, streetcar suburb.

=== Los Angeles ===
- West Hollywood was marketed by developers in the late 19th and early 20th century for its proximity, by streetcar, both to downtown Los Angeles and Pacific Ocean beaches.
- Los Cerritos, Long Beach

=== Oakland, California ===
- Piedmont, California real estate developments and the Key System (or Key Route) street car lines were built and managed by Francis Marion Smith and Frank Colton Havens.

=== Philadelphia ===
- West Philadelphia Streetcar Suburb Historic District

=== Phoenix ===
- The F. Q. Story Neighborhood Historic District was developed in the 1920s as one of Phoenix's streetcar suburbs.

=== Pittsburgh ===
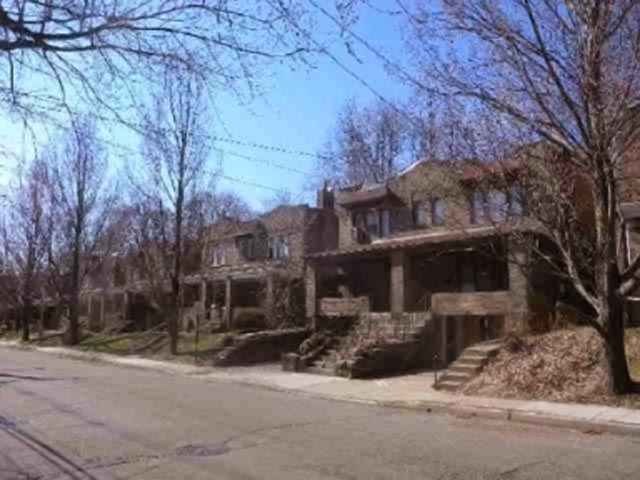
1920s tract houses in Mt Lebanon, on narrow lots backing onto the streetcar line

- The construction of streetcar lines in 1901 and 1924 turned the farming community of Mt. Lebanon, Pennsylvania, into a streetcar suburb. Today, most of the municipality—more than 4,400 residential properties—makes up the Mt. Lebanon Historic District, one of the largest residential areas listed on the National Register of Historic Places.

=== Portland, Oregon ===
- Laurelhurst was a planned community designed around the streetcar lines along Glisan Street.

=== Richmond, Virginia ===
The Richmond Union Passenger Railway was the first practical electric streetcar system in the world when it opened in 1888. The system led to the development of streetcar suburbs across Richmond and the broader metropolitan area, many of which would serve as models for others nationwide. The Richmond streetcar system was dismantled and replaced in 1949 by a bus system.

- Ginter Park
- Sauer's Gardens
- The Fan
- Museum District
- Forest Hill Park
- Bellevue
- Barton Heights
- Highland Park
- Woodland Heights
- Swansboro

=== San Jose, California ===
- Hanchett Residence Park was San Jose's first streetcar suburb. It was built in 1907 by Lewis E. Hanchett, who connected his streetcar system directly into the neighborhood using formal entrance gates, separate automobile entrances, and two of the earliest roundabout traffic circles built in America. The layout was designed by famed San Francisco Golden Gate Park designer John McLaren. San Jose's Alum Rock Park and Venodome Hotel were also on different spurs of the streetcar line connecting downtown.

=== Seattle ===
- Columbia City was established as an independent town in 1891 along the Rainier Avenue Electric Railway.
- Ravenna was established adjacent to Ravenna Park after a streetcar line was built by the Rainier Power and Railway Company in 1891.

=== Toronto ===
- West Hill, Cliffside, Birch Cliff, Riverdale, The Beaches, North Toronto, Parkdale, New Toronto, Mimico and Long Branch are all streetcar suburbs. The Scarborough neighbourhoods of West Hill (c. 1906) and Cliffside (c. 1901) lost their service in 1936 under the Toronto Transportation Commission (TTC). Birch Cliff lost its streetcar service (began in 1897) by the TTC in 1954. Streetcar service was also provided far outside of the modern Toronto areas as interurbans, into Port Credit west of Long Branch on the lakefront, which is now part of the city of Mississauga.

=== Washington, D.C. ===
Beginning in the late 1800s, streetcars spurred development in numerous villages in Washington County, D.C., including Brightwood, Mount Pleasant, Tenleytown, LeDroit Park, Uniontown, and Brookland. One developer built a streetcar line to support his creation of the Chevy Chase neighborhoods in D.C. and Maryland. Transit lines also spread out of Washington and into the surrounding areas of Montgomery and Prince George's counties in Maryland, heading out to Rockville, Forest Glen, Kensington, Takoma Park, and Berwyn Heights. The streetcar helped shape the development of the Gateway Arts District from Mount Rainier through Hyattsville and Riverdale Park and beyond through College Park to Laurel.

== See also ==
- New Urbanism
- Transit-oriented development
- Metro-Land
- Interurban
- Commuter town
- Transit village
- Commuter rail
- Railway town
