= Shiras station =

Light rail station in Pittsburgh, Pennsylvania, U.S.

Shiras
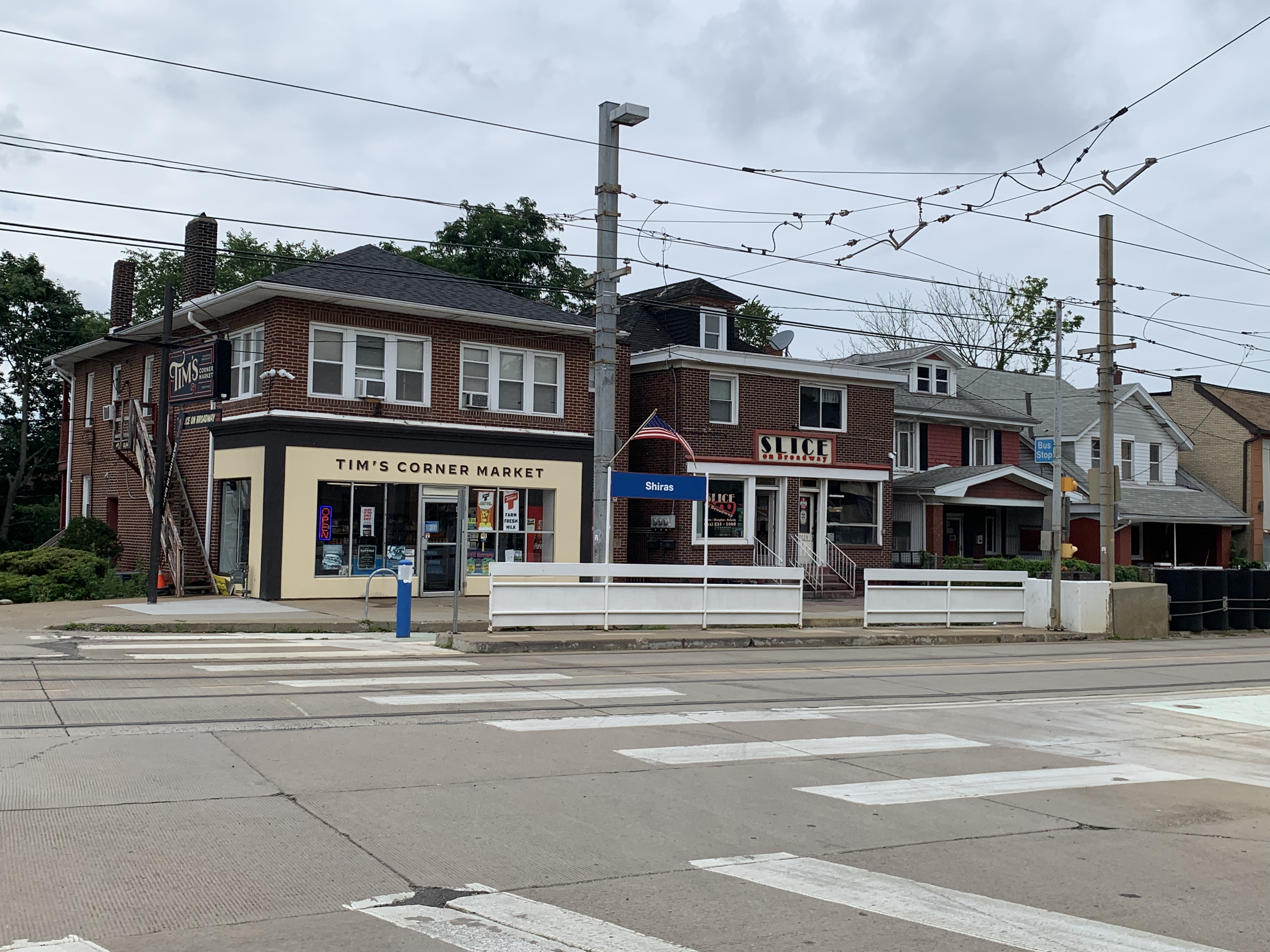

General information
- Location: Broadway and Shiras avenues Pittsburgh, Pennsylvania
- Coordinates: 40.4040°N 80.0302°W
- Owner: Pittsburgh Regional Transit
- Line: Overbrook line
- Platforms: 2 side platforms
- Tracks: 2

Construction
- Accessible: No, under construction

History
- Opened: May 22, 1987

Passengers
- 2018: 147 (weekday boardings)

Services
Preceding station	Pittsburgh Regional Transit	Following station
Belasco toward Allegheny	Red Line	Stevenson toward South Hills Village
Former services
Preceding station	Port Authority of Allegheny County	Following station
Boustead Closed 2012 toward Allegheny	Red Line Overbrook Junction via Beechview	Neeld Closed 2012 toward Overbrook Junction or South Hills Village
Location

Shiras station is a station on Pittsburgh Regional Transit's light rail network, located in the Beechview neighborhood of Pittsburgh, Pennsylvania. The street level stop is located on a small island platform in the middle of Broadway Avenue, through which The T travels along former streetcar tracks.

In 2022, the Federal Transit Administration awarded Pittsburgh Regional Transit $28.4 million to construct accessible platforms at four Red Line stops, including Shiras.
