= Mt. Lebanon station =

Light rail station in Mt. Lebanon, Pennsylvania, U.S

Mt. Lebanon
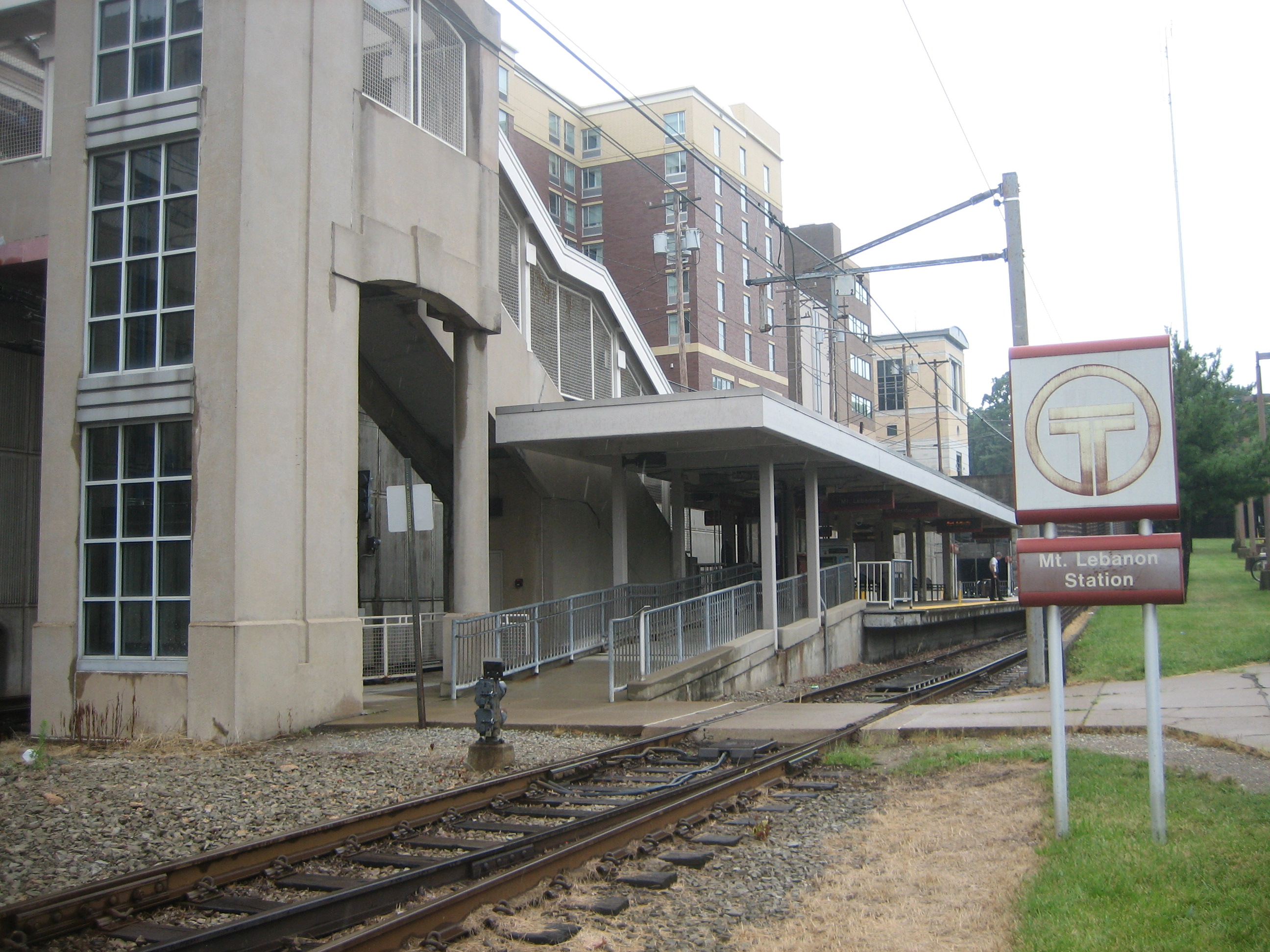
- Mt. Lebanon station in 2016, looking north from Shady Drive East

General information
- Location: Shady Drive East and Alfred Road; Mt. Lebanon, Pennsylvania
- Coordinates: 40.38236°N 80.04329°W
- Owner: Pittsburgh Regional Transit
- Platforms: 1 island platform
- Tracks: 2
- Connections: Pittsburgh Regional Transit: 38

Construction
- Parking: 24 spaces
- Accessible: Yes

History
- Opened: May 22, 1987

Passengers
- 2021: 2,885 (daily boardings)

Services
Preceding station	Pittsburgh Regional Transit	Following station
Dormont Junction toward Allegheny	Red Line	Poplar toward South Hills Village
Location

Mt. Lebanon is a station on the Red Line of Pittsburgh Regional Transit's light rail system, serving Mt. Lebanon, Pennsylvania. Opened in 1987, as of 2005 it serves an average of up to 2,000 passengers a day through both rail and bus connections.

== History ==
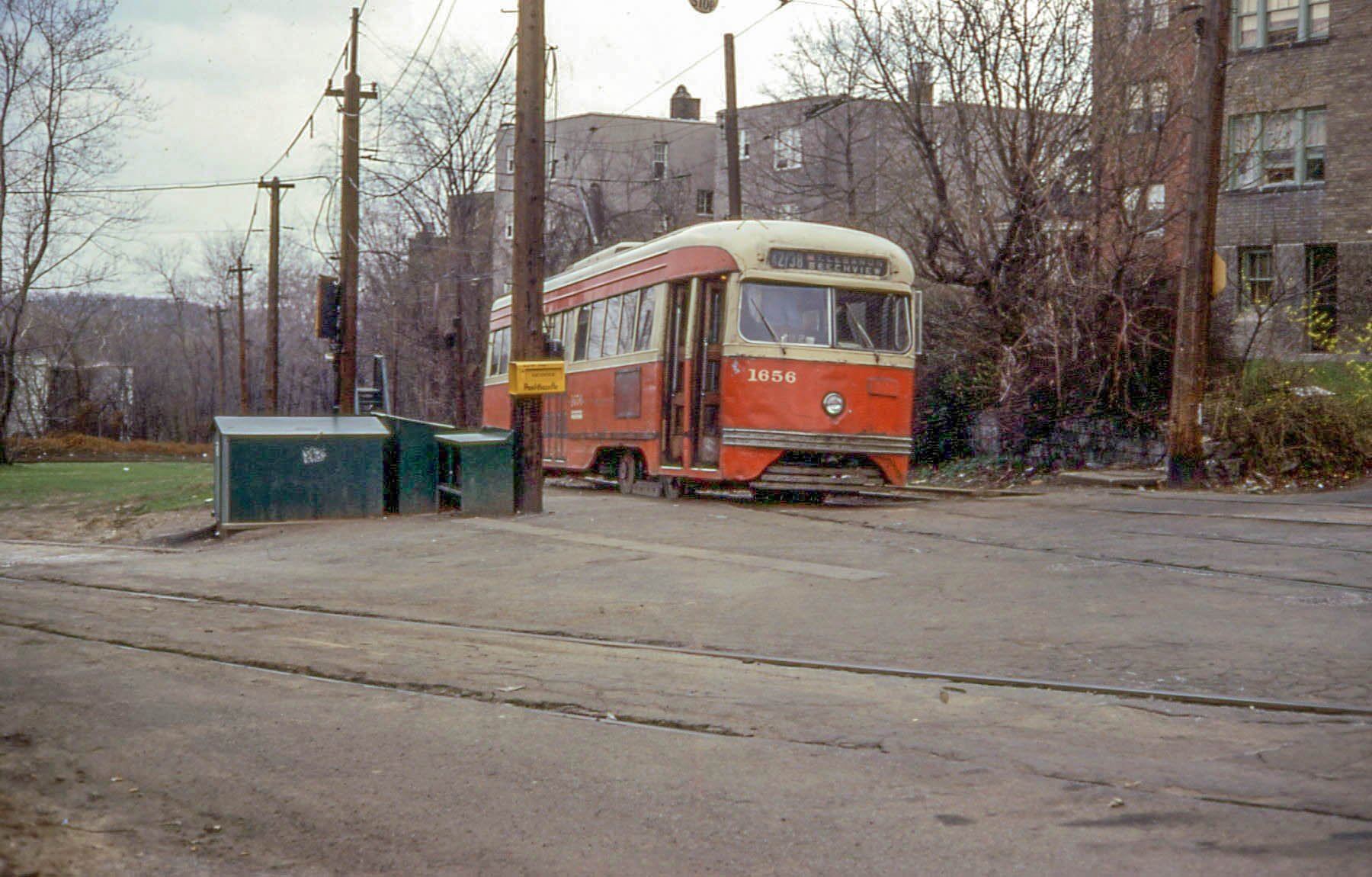
A Pittsburgh Railways trolley car on the Clearview Loop in 1963.

Prior to the construction of the Pittsburgh Light Rail system, the area around the present-day Mt. Lebanon station was served by the Clearview Loop station, located a short distance from the present-day station on Alfred Road on a balloon loop that served as the terminus for the 38 Mt. Lebanon trolley service operated by Pittsburgh Railways. On May 26, 1963, the 38 Mt. Lebanon was replaced by the 42/38 Mt. Lebanon via Beechview service which extended the previous 42 Dormont trolley service to Mt. Lebanon from Dormont Junction.

Planning for the present-day Mt. Lebanon station began in 1979, alongside planning for the Mt. Lebanon Tunnel. As construction of the tunnel progressed, Clearview Loop services were terminated on April 15, 1984, with the loop and the trolley tracks on Washington Road subsequently removed and affected routes replaced by corresponding bus service. To celebrate the closing of the station and the impending opening of the new light rail system, a "Trolley Day" was held on Washington Road the night before to commemorate the over eighty years of trolley service to and from Mt. Lebanon.

The station was scheduled to be opened on Thanksgiving Day, November 28, 1984, but completion of the station was delayed owing to delays in the release of federal subsidies, compounded by construction problems. It ultimately opened on May 22, 1987, with revenue service commencing two days later on May 24, 1987, completing Pittsburgh's first modern light rail line.

The station's air rights were later sold to the municipal government of Mt. Lebanon on November 20, 1987, for $485,000 to allow for commercial development on the stretch of Washington Road immediately above the station, including direct station access to Washington Road, office and residential housing units, and the construction of a new 500-slot municipal-owned parking garage, replacing an existing parking garage that was built in the 1950s. Construction of the parking garage was not without controversy, with the original proposal being shelved in 1989 due to a lack of financing, a reduced 350-slot garage being shelved in 1991, and an even smaller garage, with room for 262 cars and a direct connection to the station, ultimately being opened in February 1994.

In July 2016, a contract was awarded for an upcoming facelift of the station — part of an $830,000 program to improve both the station and the two municipal-owned parking garages on Washington Road as part of the final phase of a five-year capital improvement plan.

== Facilities and connections ==
The station features a small 24-slot parking lot, making it a minor stop for park and ride commuters. A bike rack was also installed when the station was constructed.

It is located one block from Mt. Lebanon's busy Washington Road corridor, which is lined with business and office parks. Walkways connect the station with one of two municipal-owned public parking garages on Washington Road, also popular with commuters. Bus service connects many major residential streets directly with the station.

In 2008, three of the station's walls were painted with murals commemorating the 250th anniversary of the city of Pittsburgh.
