= Dormont Junction station =

Dormont Junction
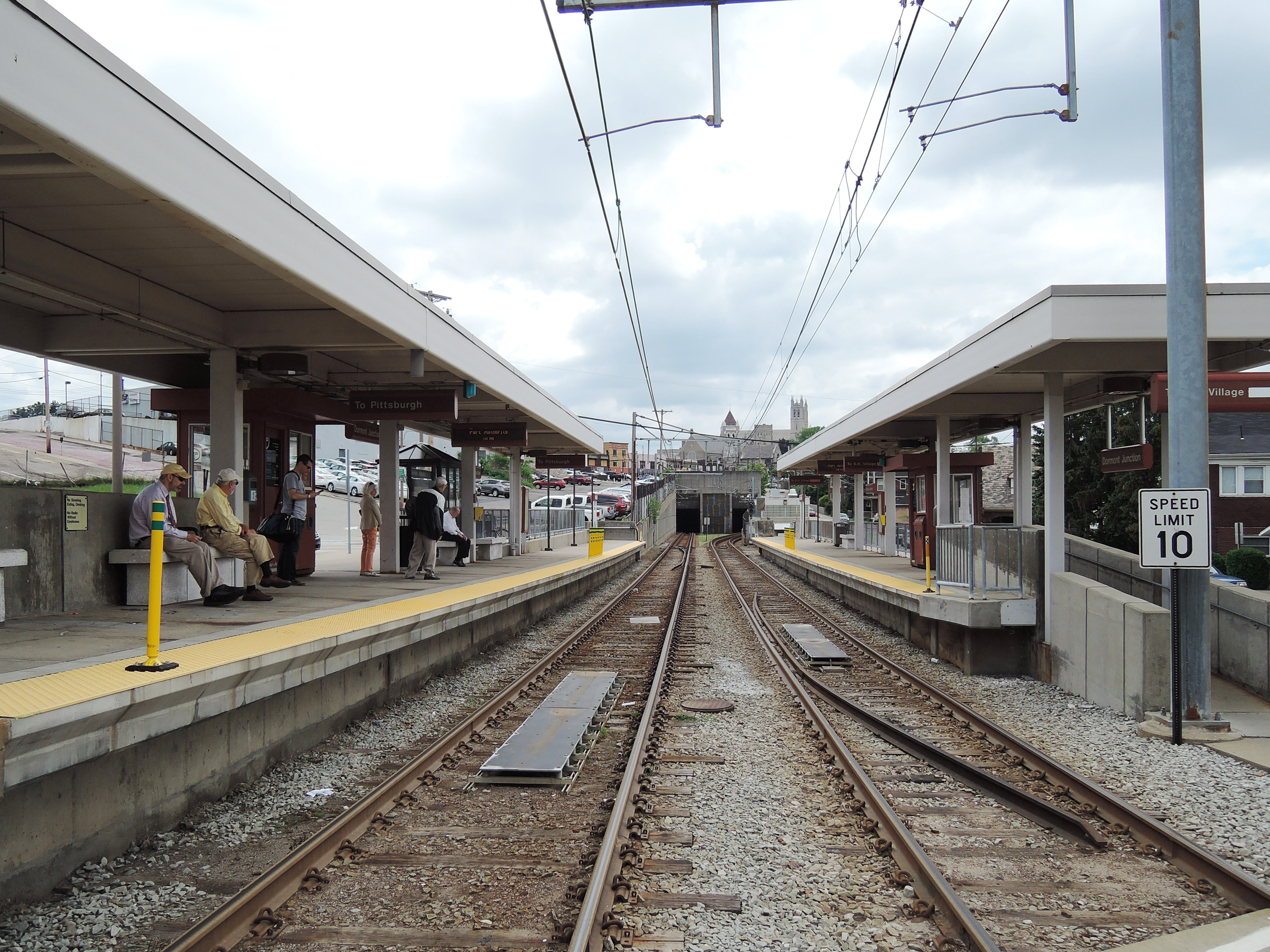
- Dormont Junction in 2011

General information
- Location: Raleigh Avenue; Dormont, Pennsylvania 15216
- Coordinates: 40.391563°N 80.040969°W
- Owner: Pittsburgh Regional Transit
- Platforms: 2 side platforms
- Tracks: 2
- Connections: Bus routes 41 Bower Hill

Construction
- Parking: 132 spaces
- Accessible: Yes

History
- Opened: 1985

Passengers
- 2018: 464 (weekday boardings)

Services
Preceding station	Pittsburgh Regional Transit	Following station
Potomac toward Allegheny	Red Line	Mt. Lebanon toward South Hills Village
Former services
Preceding station	Port Authority of Allegheny County	Following station
Kelton Closed 2012 toward Allegheny	Red Line Overbrook Junction via Beechview	Mt. Lebanon toward Overbrook Junction or South Hills Village
Location

Dormont Junction is a station on the Red Line route of Pittsburgh Regional Transit's light rail network. It is located in Dormont, Pennsylvania. The station is an important park and ride facility, featuring 132 spaces. West Liberty Avenue, Dormont's main artery, is located one block uphill from the station, in a portion of the street that is lined with automobile dealerships. Opposite the commercial sector, a densely populated residential area is located with many homes within walking distance of the station.

== History ==
The original Dormont Junction was a wye between the Pittsburgh Railways private right of way 42 Dormont and the street running 38 Mt. Lebanon. The station stopped being a junction in 1963 when the two routes were combined into the 42/38 Mt. Lebanon Beechview, but the name remained. However, it remains one of only a few places along the route with a Railroad switch allowing the trains to switch tracks. The current station was built in 1985 along with the 2,800 feet (850 m) Mt. Lebanon Tunnel, which bypassed 8 blocks of street running along Washington Road.

== Connecting buses ==
- 41 Bower Hill: West Liberty Avenue at Park Boulevard
