= Poplar station (Pittsburgh) =

Light rail station in Allegheny County, Pennsylvania, U.S.

Poplar
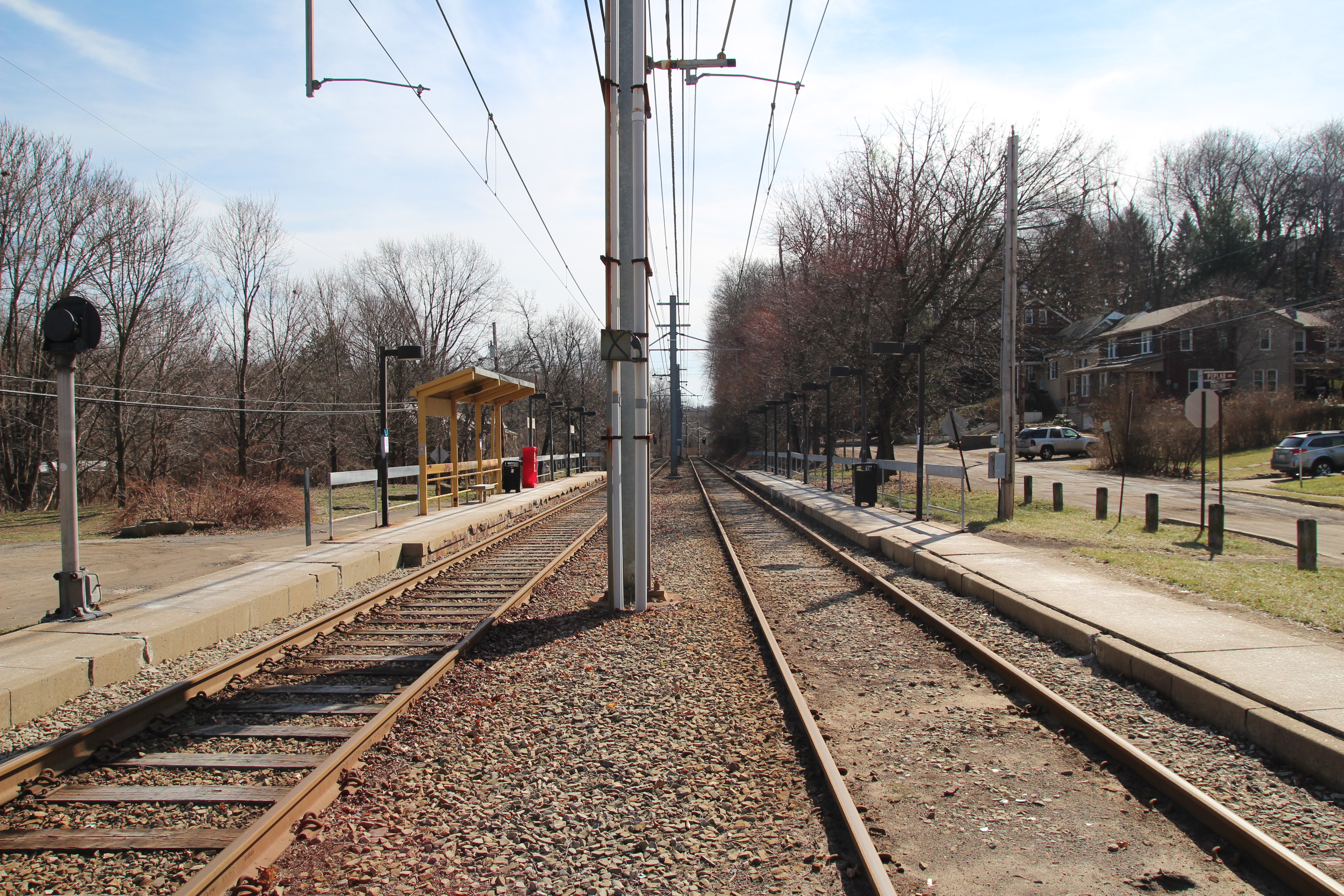

General information
- Location: Pennsylvania Boulevard at Poplar Drive; Mt. Lebanon, Pennsylvania
- Coordinates: 40.3753°N 80.03840°W
- Owner: Pittsburgh Regional Transit
- Platforms: 2 side platforms
- Tracks: 2

Construction
- Accessible: No, under construction

History
- Opened: May 22, 1987

Passengers
- 2018: 124 (weekday boardings)

Services
Preceding station	Pittsburgh Regional Transit	Following station
Mt. Lebanon toward Allegheny	Red Line	Arlington toward South Hills Village
Location

Poplar station is a station on Pittsburgh Regional Transit's light rail network, located in Mt. Lebanon, Pennsylvania. The street level stop is located in a densely populated residential area. Its primary purpose is to serve commuters within walking distance, providing access toward Downtown Pittsburgh, South Hills Village, or Library.

In May 2024, the Federal Transit Administration awarded Pittsburgh Regional Transit $8 million to construct accessible platforms at ten stops, including Poplar.
