= Potomac station (Pittsburgh) =

Potomac
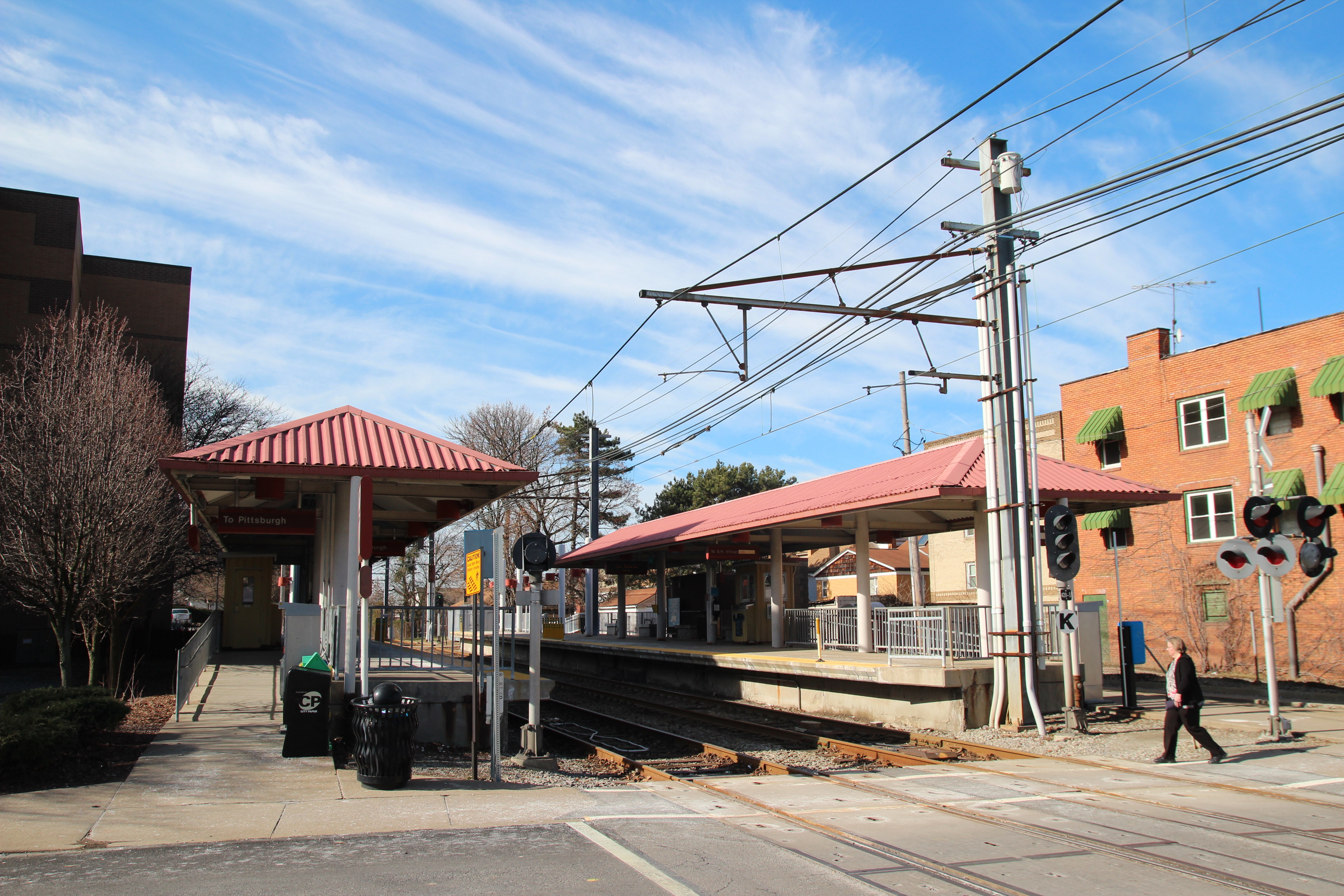

General information
- Location: Broadway and Potomac Avenues, Dormont, Pennsylvania 15216
- Coordinates: 40.3974°N 80.0362°W
- Owner: Pittsburgh Regional Transit
- Platforms: 2 side platforms
- Tracks: 2

Construction
- Parking: 22 spaces
- Accessible: Yes

History
- Opened: May 22, 1987

Passengers
- 2018: 509 (weekday boardings)

Services
Preceding station	Pittsburgh Regional Transit	Following station
Stevenson toward Allegheny	Red Line	Dormont Junction toward South Hills Village
Former services
Preceding station	Port Authority of Allegheny County	Following station
Stevenson toward Allegheny	Red Line Overbrook Junction via Beechview	Kelton Closed 2012 toward Overbrook Junction or South Hills Village
Location

Potomac is a station on the Red Line route of Pittsburgh Regional Transit's light rail network. It is located in Dormont, Pennsylvania. The station serves as a small commuter stop, featuring 22 parking spaces. It is located in a densely populated residential area and is designed to provide the primary access route for area residents to Downtown Pittsburgh.
