= Liberty Tunnel =

Twin tunnels in Pittsburgh, Pennsylvania

Liberty Tunnels
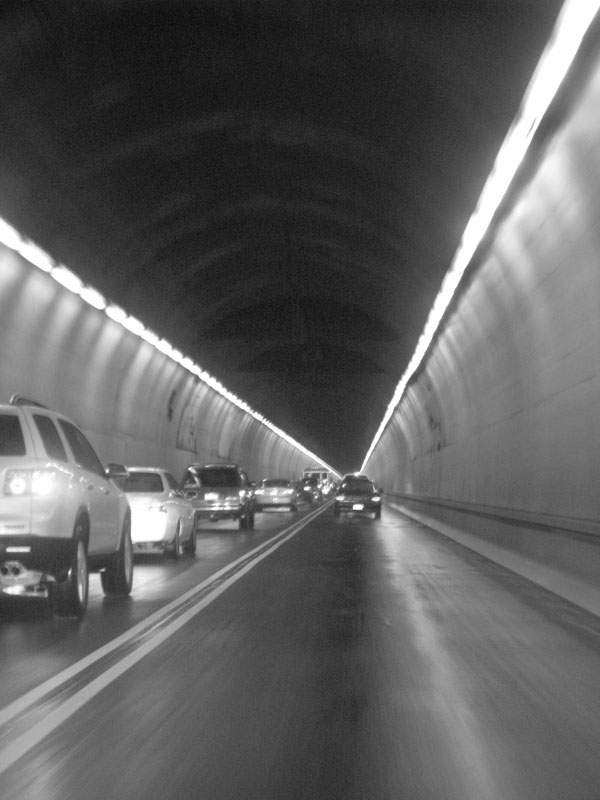
- Traffic flowing through the Liberty Tunnels
- Interactive map of Liberty Tunnels

Overview
- Other name: Liberty Tubes
- Location: Mount Washington, Pittsburgh, Pennsylvania
- Coordinates: 40.429055°N 79.999419°W

Operation
- Opened: 1924
- Character: Twin horseshoe profile road tunnels

Technical
- Length: 5,889 feet (1,795 m)
- No. of lanes: 4
- Tunnel clearance: 13 ft 6 in (4.11 m)

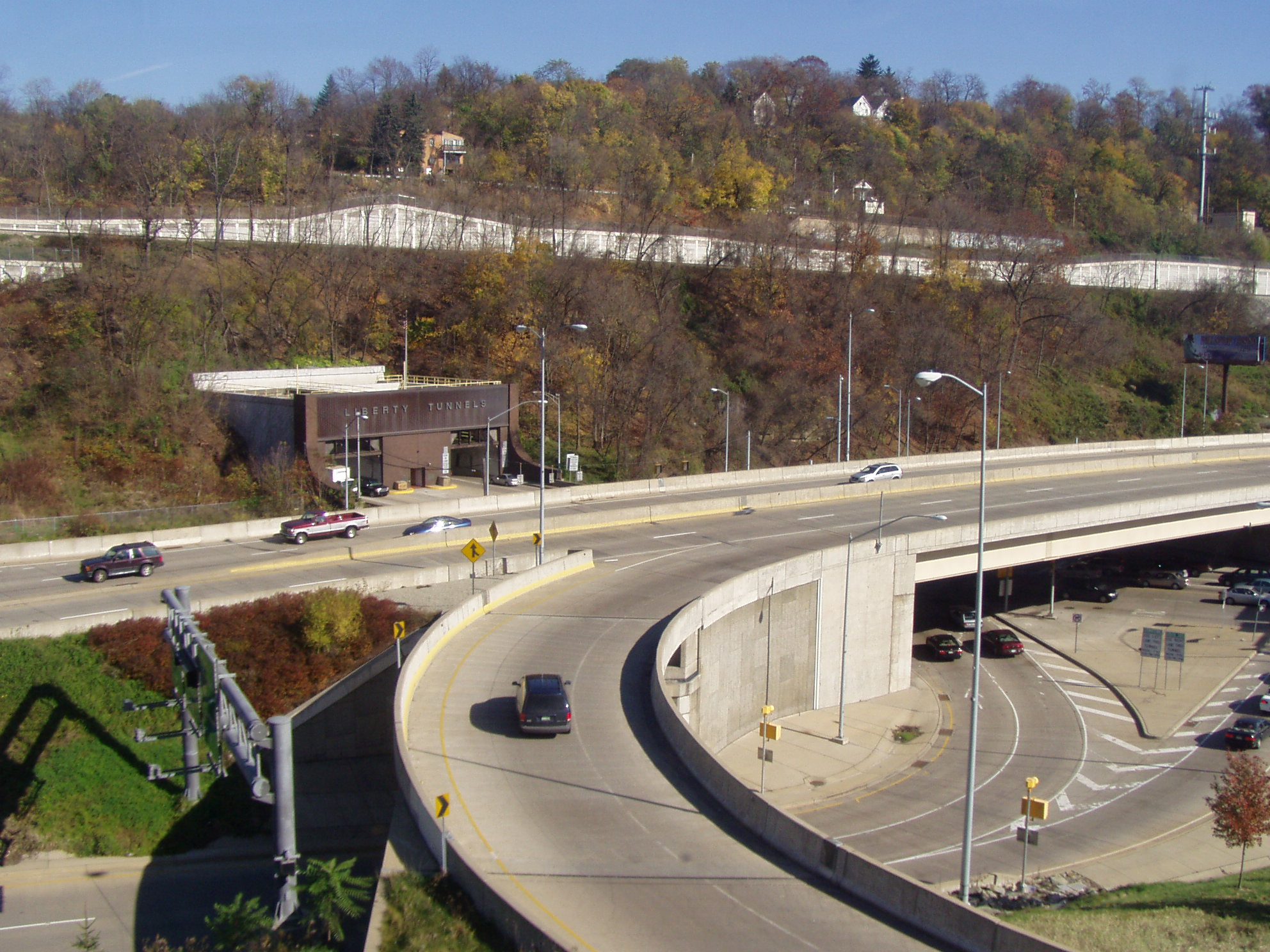
Liberty Tunnels south end in 2004

The Liberty Tunnels (also known as the Liberty Tubes) are a pair of tunnels located in Pittsburgh, Pennsylvania, United States, that allow motorists to travel between the South Hills of Pittsburgh and the city, beneath Mount Washington. The tunnels were vital in the expansion of the South Hills suburbs by providing a direct route to the city, eliminating the time-consuming task of navigating around or over Mt. Washington and its inclines. Opening in 1924, the Liberty Tunnels are the longest automobile tunnel in the City of Pittsburgh.

== Design ==
The tunnels were designed by Amos D. Neeld, who would also supervise the construction of the adjoining Liberty Bridge, which gives travelers a way to cross the Monongahela River after passing through the tunnels. The design was two vertical wall horseshoe profile tunnels, each consisting of two lanes of traffic and a 4 ft (1.2 m) sidewalk. The sidewalks, being minimally used and in disrepair, were removed during a renovation in the 1970s in order to widen and increase the height of the traffic lanes.

=== Proposed alternatives ===
Prior to the construction of the Liberty Tunnels, many other projects were proposed. One plan, from engineer W. M. Donley, did not involve constructing tunnels, but called for a deep cut through the mountain. This would eliminate the need for a tunnel, but the pitch was rejected. Many residents wanted tunnels to be built in Shalerville. Later in 1959, the Fort Pitt Tunnels were constructed very near this proposed area. Similarly, other residents wanted tunnels to be built in a valley behind Mt. Washington that led to Dormont and Mt. Lebanon. They would follow a low line to exit at Saw Mill Run. This was known as the Bell Tavern plan, which was modified to create the Liberty Tunnels. The final plan for the tunnels shared the southern Bell Tavern portal, but followed a higher line to emerge on the north face of Mt. Washington. This plan required the construction of a new bridge, which was to become the Liberty Bridge.

== Construction ==
Booth and Flinn, Ltd. were awarded the contract to build the new tunnels in January 1919, and construction began shortly thereafter. On May 11, 1922, the boring of the tunnels was complete and in January 1924, the $6 million ($113 million in present dollars) Liberty Tunnels were opened to traffic. However, the tunnels were not yet complete and still lacked ventilation.

=== Ventilation ===
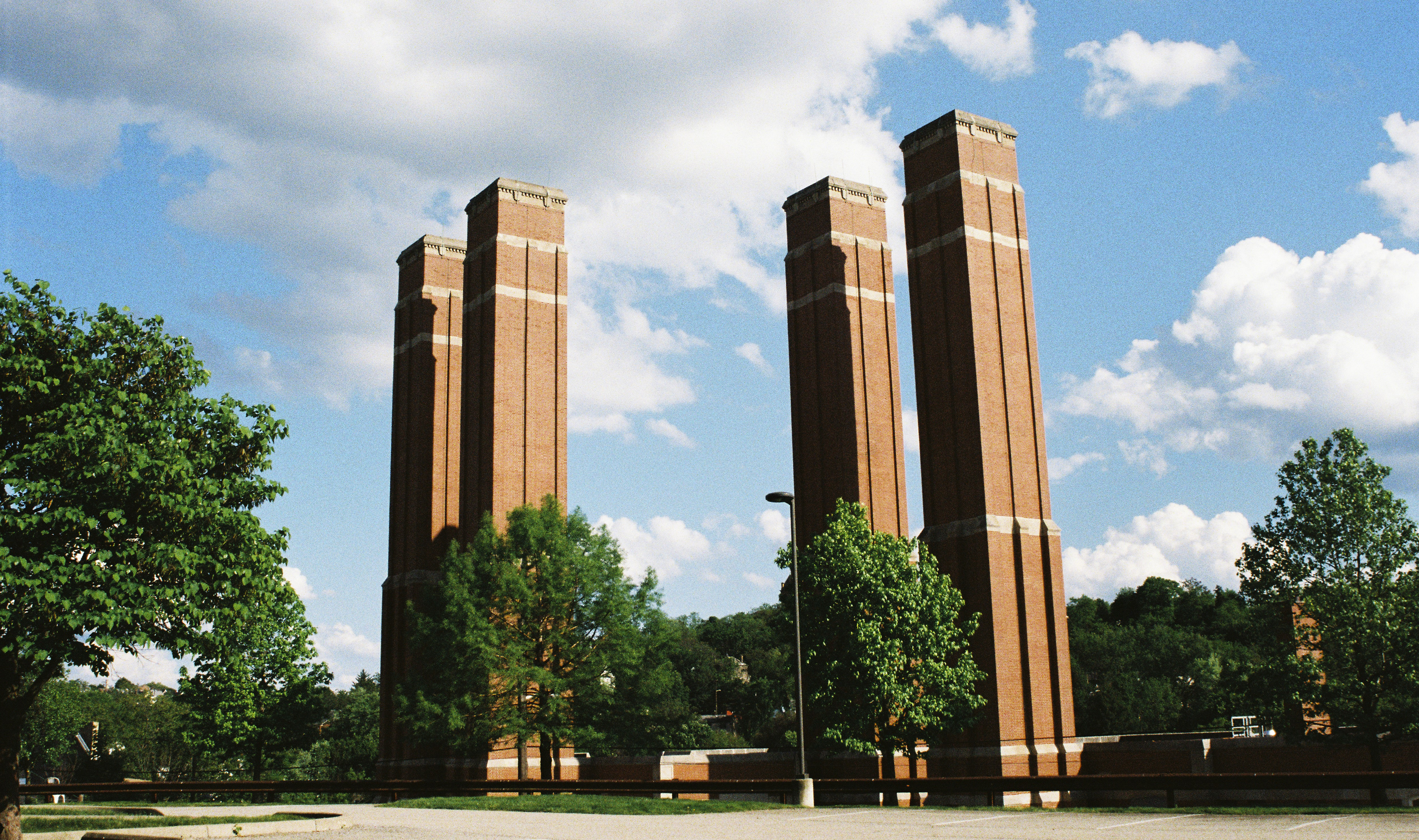
The ventilation plant on Mount Washington

There was not yet a ventilation system when the tunnels opened, but authorities decided the flow of traffic would allow for a natural draft of ventilation. On May 10, 1924, a traffic jam occurred due to a Pittsburgh Street Railway Company strike, which caused vehicles to be left stopped and idling in the tunnels. Several motorists passed out from the fumes emitted from the exhaust of the congested vehicles. For the safety of motorists, the number of vehicles permitted through the tunnels was regulated until a ventilation system was installed.

With help from the United States Bureau of Mines, tunnel engineers designed a system to ventilate the tunnels to accommodate the high traffic flow. In 1928, construction of four 200-foot (61 m) vertical shafts was completed to continuously provide fresh air to the tunnels. A plant located on top on the mountain was constructed to pump the fresh air through the shafts, which also tower 110 ft (34 m) above the plant. After the ventilation system was put into service, the traffic restrictions were lifted.

=== Liberty Bridge ===
Following the completion of the Liberty Tunnels, the Liberty Bridge was completed and linked to the tunnels on March 27, 1928. The bridge and tunnel combination gave motorists and pedestrians a direct route to the city without traveling over or around Mount Washington.

== Dimensions and specs ==
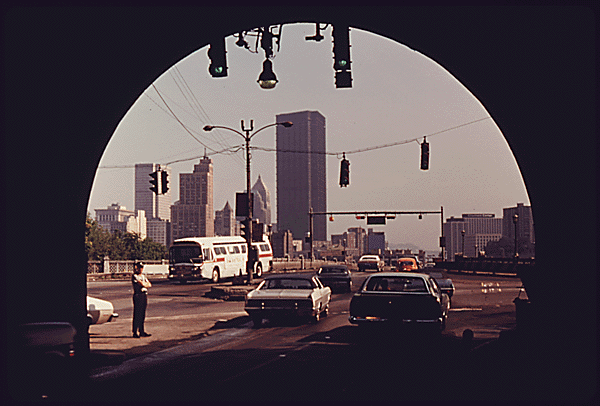
Pittsburgh, as seen through the northern end of the Liberty Tunnels in 1974

- 5,889 ft (1,795 m) in length
- Twin tunnels (1 inbound, 1 outbound)
- 2 lanes in each tunnel
- Vertical wall horseshoe profile
- 11 cross passages (Liberty Tunnels)
- 14 ft 6 in (4.42 m) posted vertical clearance (Liberty Tunnels)
- Each tunnel is 28.6 ft (8.7 m) wide and 20.75 ft (6.32 m) high to arch (Liberty Tunnels)
- Floor slopes upward 0.329 percent grade to Saw Mill Run portal 20 ft (6.1 m) higher (Liberty Tunnels)
- Opened in 1924
- Between:
  - Liberty Bridge [SR 3069]; P. J. McArdle Roadway (Mount Washington Roadway)
  - Saw Mill Run Blvd [PA 51]; West Liberty Ave [SR 3069] (Liberty Tunnels)

== Reception ==
In 1941 it became the first tunnel in the world to provide AM radio reception throughout.

Since August 1987 the tunnels have provided cellular phone reception.

As the Heinz History Center points out, the Liberty Tunnels were the longest tunnels at that time built exclusively for automobiles. Nevertheless, they were not the first tunnel in the United States built exclusively for automobiles. A previous automobile tunnel, the Hill Street Tunnel in Los Angeles, was built 12 years earlier.
