= Mt. Lebanon Tunnel =

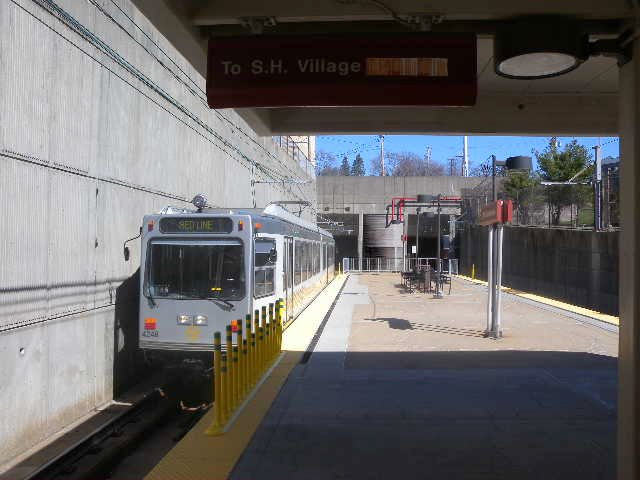
- Southern portal as seen from the platform of Mt. Lebanon station
- Interactive map of Mt. Lebanon Tunnel

Overview
- Line: Red Line
- Location: Allegheny County, Pennsylvania
- Status: Operational
- System: Pittsburgh Light Rail
- Start: Dormont Junction
- End: Mt. Lebanon

Operation
- Constructed: New Austrian tunneling method
- Opened: April 15, 1984
- Owner: Pittsburgh Regional Transit

Technical
- Length: 3,000 ft (910 m)
- No. of tracks: 2
- Track gauge: 5 ft 2 1/2 in (1,588 mm) Pennsylvania trolley gauge
- Electrified: Overhead line, 650 V DC

The Mt. Lebanon Tunnel is a light rail tunnel in Allegheny County, Pennsylvania, also known as the Dormont–Mt. Lebanon Transit Tunnel, and is part of the Pittsburgh Light Rail system operated by Pittsburgh Regional Transit (PRT).

The 3,000-foot (910 m) tunnel connects Dormont Junction and Mt. Lebanon stations beneath Washington Road and West Liberty Avenue, extending from Shady Drive East to McFarland Road at a maximum depth of 100 feet (30 m). The alignment passes beneath a cemetery.

Prior to the tunnel's construction, a surface streetcar line operated along a similar corridor until 1984, running between the former Clearview Loop on Alfred Street in Mt. Lebanon and the intersection of McFarland Road and Raleigh Avenue in Dormont.

The tunnel was constructed using the New Austrian tunnelling method (NATM), a technique developed in the early 1960s that relies on the surrounding rock to provide structural support. This marked one of the first applications of NATM for transit construction in the United States. The method involves reinforcing the excavated cavity with successive layers of shotcrete applied under pressure, rather than relying on heavy steel frameworks and thick concrete linings used in conventional tunneling.

The tunnel is equipped with continuous closed-circuit television (CCTV) surveillance.

PRT has planned a $16.1 million, 34-month project to replace track within the tunnel and improve the nearby Raleigh Avenue grade crossing in Dormont, with construction expected to begin in summer 2026. To minimize service disruptions, trains are expected to operate using a single-track through the tunnel, allowing construction to proceed on one track while the other remains in use. The project is expected to cost $16.1 million.
