= USS Abraham Lincoln (SSBN-602) =

George Washington class fleet ballistic missile submarine

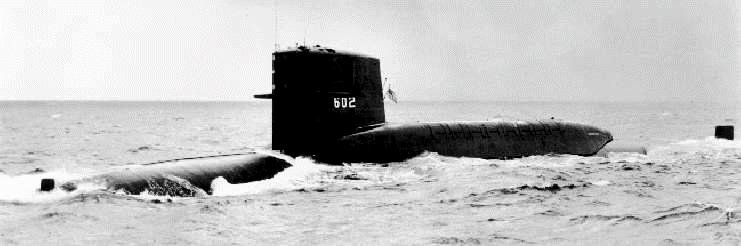
- Abraham Lincoln travelling on the surface

History

United States
- Namesake: Abraham Lincoln
- Ordered: 30 July 1958
- Builder: Portsmouth Naval Shipyard
- Laid down: 1 November 1958
- Launched: 14 May 1960
- Sponsored by: Mary L. Beckwith
- Commissioned: 11 March 1961
- Decommissioned: 28 February 1981
- Stricken: 1 December 1982
- Fate: Recycled via Submarine recycling 10 May 1994
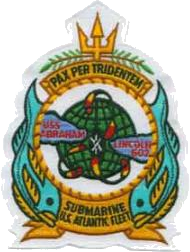
- Badge

General characteristics
- Class & type: George Washington-class submarine
- Displacement: 5,400 tons light; 5,959–6,019 tons surfaced; 6,709–6,888 approx. tons submerged
- Length: 381.6 ft (116.3 m)
- Beam: 33 ft (10 m)
- Draft: 29 ft (8.8 m)
- Propulsion: 1 S5W PWR; 2 geared turbines at 15,000 shp (11,000 kW); 1 Screw
- Speed: 20 knots (37 km/h) surfaced; +25 knots (46 km/h) submerged
- Range: unlimited except by food supplies
- Test depth: 700 ft (210 m)
- Complement: Two crews (Blue/Gold) each consisting of 12 officers and 100 enlisted
- Armament: 16 Polaris A1/A3 missiles; 6 × 21 in (533 mm) torpedo tubes

USS Abraham Lincoln (SSBN-602), a George Washington-class fleet ballistic missile submarine, was the second ship of the United States Navy to be named for Abraham Lincoln, the 16th President of the United States (1861–1865), the first being USS President Lincoln (1907).

Her keel was laid down by the Portsmouth Naval Shipyard of Kittery, Maine, on 1 November 1958. She was launched on 14 May 1960 sponsored by Mary L. Beckwith (great-granddaughter of President Abraham Lincoln), and commissioned on 8 March 1961 with Commander Leonard Erb commanding the Blue Crew and Commander Donald M. Miller commanding the Gold Crew.

== Atlantic operations ==
Abraham Lincoln got underway on 20 March 1961 for shakedown and weapons testing at Cape Canaveral, Florida, and returned to Portsmouth Naval Shipyard on 1 June for post-shakedown repairs. See USS Thresher (SSN-593)#Cause for more on silver brazing joint failures. She left Portsmouth Naval Shipyard on 17 July 1961 to return briefly to Cape Canaveral for further testing and then proceeded to Charleston, South Carolina, for a final loadout. Abraham Lincoln subsequently got underway on 28 August 1961 as a unit of SUBRON 14. She arrived at Holy Loch, Scotland, in October 1961. She underwent a refit alongside submarine tender USS Proteus during November 1961 and, upon its completion, commenced her first deterrent patrol.

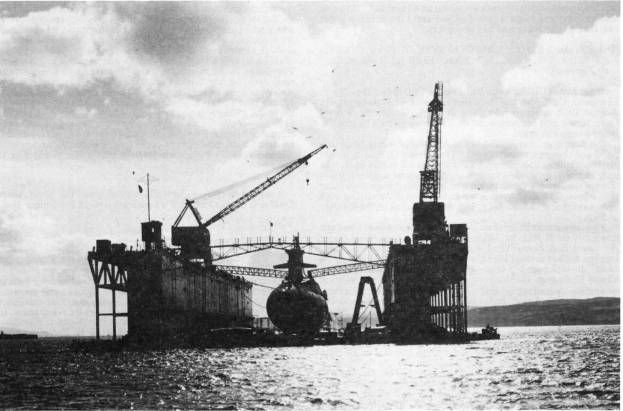
Abraham Lincoln undergoing repairs in floating drydock Los Alamos at Holy Loch, Scotland, on 19 March 1963.

Abraham Lincoln operated out of Holy Loch for the next four years. She alternated periods of upkeep at Holy Loch alongside Proteus or submarine tender USS Hunley with deterrent patrols from that port.

A highlight of this period occurred during the Cuban Missile Crisis of October 1962. Abraham Lincoln was in the middle of a scheduled four-week upkeep period when she received orders to deploy. She departed in short order and successfully carried out a 65-day patrol.

On 13 October 1965, Abraham Lincoln arrived at Groton, Connecticut, and entered the Electric Boat shipyard there on 25 October 1965 to begin an overhaul and refueling.

This work was completed on 3 June 1967, and Abraham Lincoln returned to her base at Holy Loch and resumed her schedule of deterrent patrols. She continued the pattern of alternating patrols with periods of upkeep alongside either submarine tender USS Simon Lake or submarine tender USS Canopus through 1972.

In early March 1972, Abraham Lincoln departed for the United States and arrived at Naval Submarine Base New London at Groton, Connecticut, on 25 April 1972. She held two dependents' cruises before getting underway on 19 May for the United States West Coast to join the United States Pacific Fleet. Abraham Lincoln made a brief visit to Fort Lauderdale, Florida, transited the Panama Canal on 1 June, sailed to Bangor, Washington, to offload her missiles, then pushed on to San Francisco. On 25 June 1972, Abraham Lincoln entered the Mare Island Naval Shipyard at Vallejo, California, to commence overhaul and refueling.

== Pacific operations ==
The extensive overhaul was completed in December 1973. After shakedown in the areas around Puget Sound and San Diego Abraham Lincoln transited the Panama Canal on 1 June 1974. She held tests and local operations at Cape Canaveral and Charleston, South Carolina. She retransitted the Panama Canal on 26 July 1974 and proceeded to her new home port, Pearl Harbor, Hawaii, where she arrived on 10 September 1974 to become part of CINCPAC Fleet and Squadron 15. She then continued on to her advanced base at Guam, arriving on 18 October 1974. She then began deterrent patrols in the Mariana Islands from Guam, which she carried out until 1978. She also participated in numerous tests and exercises. During this period, Abraham Lincoln became the first ballistic missile submarine to have conducted 50 strategic deterrent patrols, completing her 50th in 1978.

== Deactivation, decommissioning, and disposal ==
Abraham Lincoln completed her last patrol in October 1979 and arrived at Bangor, Washington, on 30 October 1979 to commence offloading her missiles before beginning inactivation overhaul. Preparations for her retirement continued through 1980 and into 1981.

Abraham Lincoln was decommissioned on 28 February 1981 and stricken from the Naval Vessel Register on 1 December 1982. She was disposed of through the Ship and Submarine Recycling Program on 10 May 1994 at the Puget Sound Naval Shipyard.

Part of the sail from Abraham Lincoln was used to replace the damaged sail on USS George Washington after its collision with Nissho Maru. This sail is on display at the Submarine Force Library and Museum, near Groton.
