= Los Alamos (AFDB-7) =

Floating drydock

Coordinates: 25.96821°N 97.35843°W

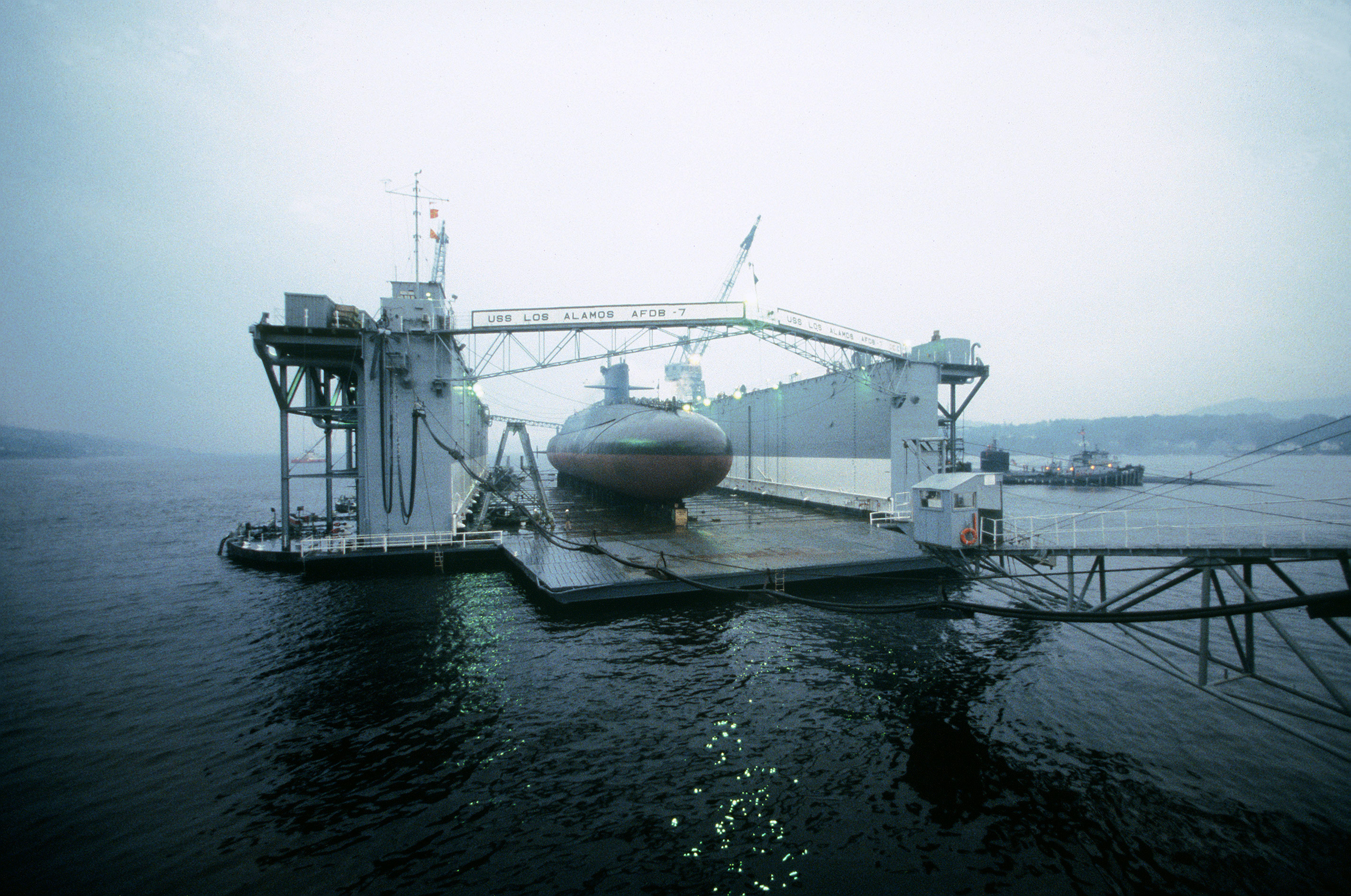
- Los Alamos (AFDB-7) at Holy Loch, Scotland

History

United States
- Name: Los Alamos
- Namesake: Los Alamos, New Mexico
- Builder: Chicago Bridge & Iron Company (4 sections); Pollock-Stockton Shipbuilding Company (2 sections); Pittsburgh-Des Moines Steel Co. (1 section)
- Commissioned: 1 March 1945
- Decommissioned: 5 December 1994
- Reclassified: AFDB-7 (Large Auxiliary Floating Dry Dock), 10 November 1961
- Stricken: 5 December 1994
- Fate: Section 'F' sunk as a target 19 July 2001, all other sections scrapped 2024 at Brownsville, TX
- Status: Scrapped

General characteristics
- Type: Advance Base Sectional Drydock
- Displacement: 30,800 long tons (31,294 t)
- Length: 825 ft 3 in (251.54 m)
- Beam: 246 ft 5 in (75.11 m)
- Draft: 8 ft 8 in (2.64 m)
- Propulsion: None
- Complement: 187
- Armament: 14 × 40 mm (1.6 in) guns; 14 × 20 mm (0.79 in) guns

ABSD-7, an advanced base sectional dock, was constructed of seven advance base docks (ABD) as follows: ABD-37, ABD-38, ABD-39, and ABD-40 were built by Chicago Bridge & Iron Company, Morgan City, Louisiana, and completed in December 1944 and January and February 1945; ABD-51 and ABD-52 were built by Pollock-Stockton Shipbuilding Company, Stockton, California, and completed in January and March 1945; and ABD-58 was built by Pittsburgh-Des Moines Steel Co., Pittsburgh, Pennsylvania, and completed in October 1944.

== Mare Island ==
The seven advance base docks were towed to Mare Island Navy Yard where they were erected and assembled into ABSD-7. Completed in March 1945, the advance base section dock began duty at Mare Island, she served there until placed on the inactive list in March 1946. In August 1946 she was reclassified to auxiliary floating drydock AFDB-7. Disassembled and towed to the east coast, she entered the Atlantic Reserve Fleet at Green Cove Springs, Florida in January 1947.

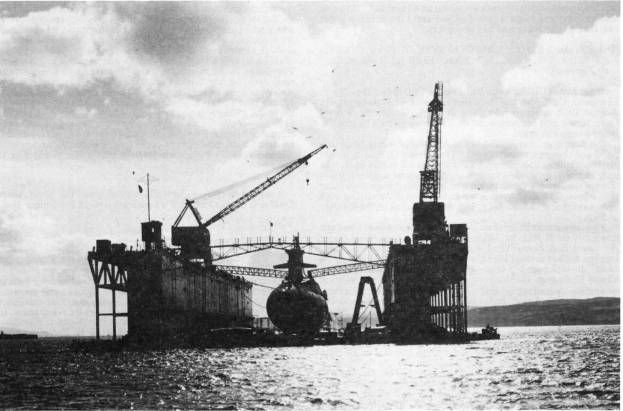
USS Abraham Lincoln (SSBN-602) in Los Alamos

== Holy Loch ==
Early in 1961, four sections—"A", "B", "C", and "D"—of AFDB‑7 were towed across the Atlantic Ocean to Holy Loch, Scotland, where on 3 March 1961 the Navy established an important base for fleet ballistic submarines. A detachment of Seabees from MCB-4 erected and assembled the four sections. Completed 10 November, the auxiliary floating drydock was placed in service as Los Alamos (AFDB-7).

Assigned to SUBRON 14, Los Alamos began drydock service for the FBM boats.

Converted for use by submarines, she had the following characteristics:

- Displacement: 18,795 long tons (19,097 t)
- Length: 513 ft (156 m)
- Draft: 9 ft 3 in (2.82 m) light, 67 ft 4 in (20.52 m) submerged
- Complement: 143
- Armament: none

Late in 1961 she carried out her first SSBN drydocking of USS George Washington (SSBN-598). She then served submarines of the "Highland Squadron" at Holy Loch. She supported refit and repair operations by submarine tenders Proteus, Hunley, Holland, Simon Lake, and Canopus. In February 1964 she successfully completed the first "off center" docking of a Polaris submarine. By providing keel blocks preset for two separate classes of SSBN boats, Los Alamos "added immeasurably to the site's repair flexibility."

On 18 June 1966, section "F" was turned over to the U.S. Army, where it was converted into a floating power plant at Kwajalein named Andrew J Weber (BD-6235). On 1 October 1977, Andrew J Weber was returned to the U.S. Navy and reinstated on the Naval Vessel Register as YFP-14. Stricken from the Naval Vessel Register on 29 May 1991, YFP-14 remained at Guam and was designated to be used in a Sinkex on 18 June 1998. YFP-14 was sunk 250 nmi (460 km; 290 mi) southeast of Agana, Guam on 19 July 2001. The Naval Vessel Register's entry for YFP-14 incorrectly indicates the vessel was sunk on 18 June 1998, that was the date the vessel was designated to be sunk.

On 5 December 1994 Los Alamos was decommissioned and stricken from the Naval Vessel Register. It was disassembled into sections and returned to the United States, the remaining six original ABSD-7 sections ("A", "B", "C", "D", "E" and "G") were transferred to the Brownsville Navigation District, Texas on 11 August 1995. It remained in use as Solomon Ortiz Dry Dock at Keppel AmFELS Shipyard, Brownsville, Texas until it was decommissioned and disposed of for scrapping in 2024
