= Natick (YTB-760) =

Tugboat of the United States Navy

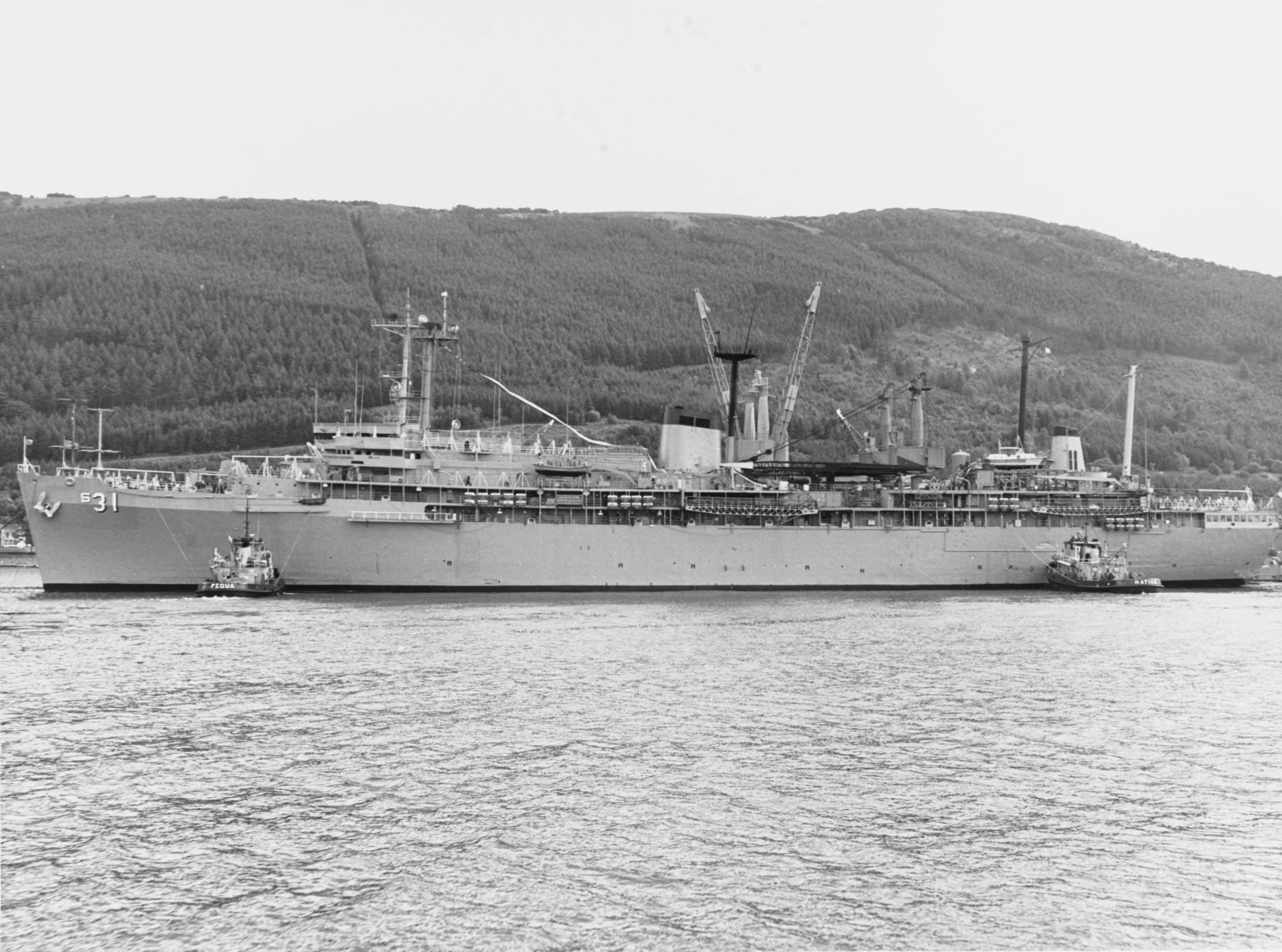
- Harbor tugs Piqua (YTB-793), at left, and Natick assist USS Hunley (AS-31) at Holy Loch, Scotland.

History

United States
- Namesake: Natick, Massachusetts
- Owner: U.S. Navy
- Awarded: 29 June 1960
- Builder: Southern Shipbuilding Corp., Slidell, Louisiana
- Laid down: 1 September 1960
- Launched: 28 February 1961
- Completed: 13 June 1961
- Acquired: 19 June 1961
- In service: 30 June 1961
- Stricken: 28 March 2003
- Homeport: Norfolk, Virginia; Holy Loch, Scotland; La Maddalena, Italy
- Identification: IMO number: 9092824; MMSI number: 367305350; Callsign: WDD8977
- Fate: Sold in 2005 into civilian service
- Status: Presently owned and operated by Burnham Associates Inc. Dredging & Marine Contractors, Salem, Massachusetts

General characteristics
- Class & type: Natick-class large harbor tug
- Displacement: 283 long tons (288 t) (light); 356 long tons (362 t) (full)
- Length: 109 feet (33 m)
- Beam: 31 feet (9.4 m)
- Draft: 14 feet (4.3 m)
- Propulsion: diesel engine, single screw
- Speed: 12 knots (14 mph; 22 km/h)
- Crew: 12 enlisted

Natick (YTB-760) was the lead ship of United States Navy Natick-class large district harbor tugs. The second U.S. Navy ship to carry that name, she is named for Natick, Massachusetts.

== Construction ==
The contract for Natick was awarded 29 June 1960. She was laid down on 1 September 1960 at Slidell, Louisiana, by Southern Shipbuilding Corp^{a} and launched 19 June 1961.

== Operational history ==
From 1961 to 1964 Natick served the 5th Naval District, Norfolk, Virginia. From 1964 into 1970 the tug was assigned to SUBRON 14 at Holy Loch, Scotland. Natick supported U.S. Navy ships at La Maddalena, Italy from 1970 to 1973. In the late 1990s, YTB-760 was stationed with Port Services supporting USS Simon Lake (AS-33) at La Maddelena, Sardinia, Italy.

Stricken from the Navy list on 28 March 2003, Natick was sold at Boston, Massachusetts, on 26 April 2005 to Burnham Associates, Inc. of Salem, Massachusetts. She currently is in operation engaged in private marine commerce and has received ABS Loadline certification as of June, 2017.
