= Piqua (YTB-793) =

Tugboat of the United States Navy

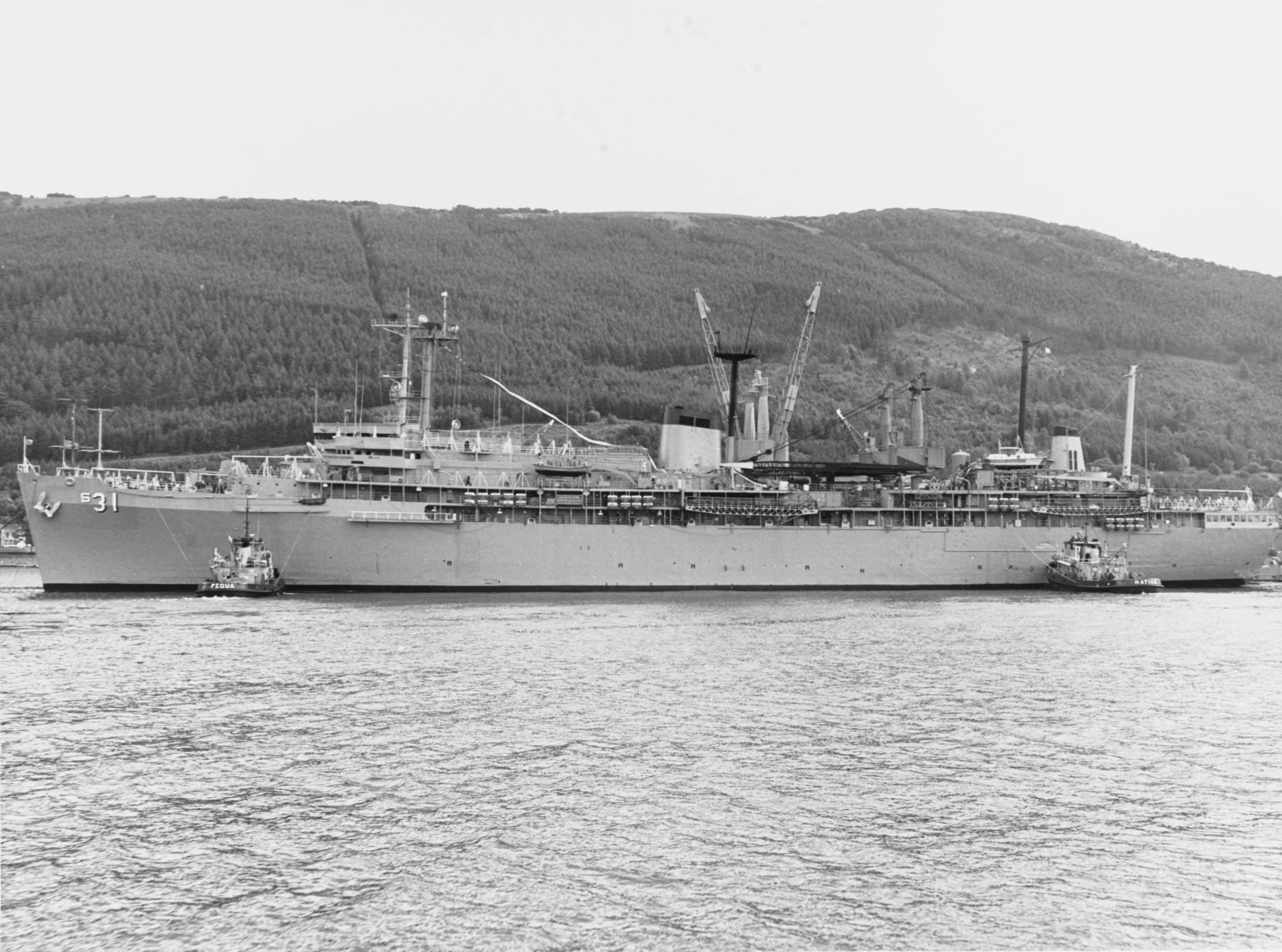
- At Holy Loch, Scotland, harbor tugs Piqua, at left, and Natick (YTB-760) assist USS Hunley (AS-31)

History

United States
- Awarded: 16 June 1966
- Builder: Marinette Marine Corp., Marinette, Wisconsin
- Laid down: 29 September 1966
- Launched: 25 April 1967
- Acquired: 10 July 1967
- Stricken: 13 March 2001
- Identification: IMO number: 8980892; MMSI number: 366836590; Callsign: WDG3673
- Fate: Sold into commercial service, 20 November 2001

General characteristics
- Class & type: Natick-class large harbor tug
- Displacement: 283 long tons (288 t) (light); 356 long tons (362 t) (full)
- Length: 109 feet (33 m)
- Beam: 31 feet (9.4 m)
- Draft: 14 feet (4.3 m)
- Propulsion: diesel engine, single screw
- Speed: 12 knots (14 mph; 22 km/h)
- Crew: 12 enlisted

Piqua (YTB-793) was a United States Navy Natick-class large harbor tug named for Piqua, Ohio. She was the second ship to bear the name.

== Construction ==
The contract for Piqua was awarded 16 June 1966. She was laid down on 29 September 1966 at Marinette, Wisconsin, by Marinette Marine and launched 25 April 1967.

== Operational history ==
Placed in service at Submarine Base New London, Connecticut, Piqua served the 3rd Naval District and Atlantic Fleet ships operating in New England waters. She was then assigned to SUBRON 14, Holy Loch, Scotland circa 1969 to 1970.

Stricken from the Navy List 13 March 2001 she was sold by the Defense Reutilization and Marketing Service 20 November 2001. Currently in civilian service as Ellen McAllister.

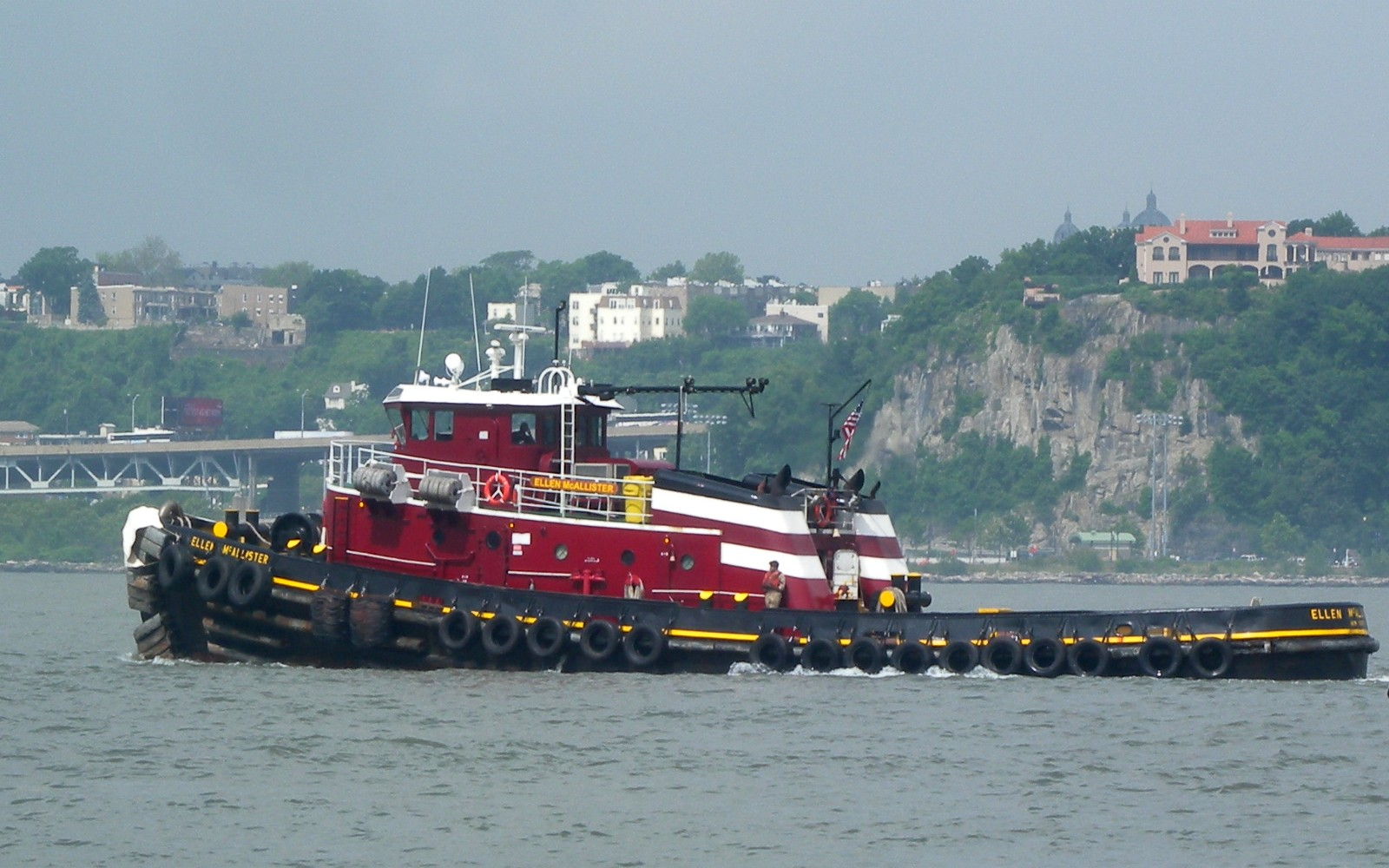
Ex-Piqua as Ellen McAllister

== Award ==
- National Defense Service Medal with star
