= Submarine Squadron 14 =

Submarine Squadron Fourteen
- Active: 1 July 1958 - 1992
- Disbanded: 1992
- Country: United States of America
- Branch: United States Navy
- Part of: Submarine Force, U.S. Atlantic Fleet
- Garrison/HQ: Bangor, Washington

Submarine Squadron 14 (SUBRON 14), also known as Site One, Holy Loch, was a United States Navy submarine squadron. It was based at Holy Loch, Firth of Clyde, Scotland, between 1958 and 1992.

== History ==
During World War II, USS Bushnell (AS-15) served as tender and staff headquarters for Submarine Squadron 14's staff and Division Staff in Pearl Harbor from July to September 1943. Postwar, it consisted of Polaris and, later, Poseidon Fleet Ballistic Missile (FBM) submarines based at Holy Loch, Firth of Clyde, on the west coast of Scotland. Commissioned on July 1, 1958, the squadron arrived at FBM Refit Site One, Holy Loch, on March 3, 1961 and departed in June 1992. The squadron was part of Submarine Force, U.S. Atlantic Fleet. The squadron also included a series of submarine tenders anchored out in the loch, initially USS Proteus (AS-19), tugs, barges, small boats, and the floating drydock Los Alamos (AFDB-7). The site was a deep, sheltered anchorage which had been a British submarine base during World War II, with the Submarine Depot Ship HMS Forth serving as a support unit for submarines training in the Clyde.

From the latter half of 1978 until November 1991, USS Will Rogers (SSBN-659) was forward deployed at Site One. On November 9, 1991, Will Rogers departed Site One, the last submarine to leave Holy Loch before Submarine Squadron 14 was deactivated.

== FBM submarine tenders assigned to SUBRON 14 ==
- USS Proteus (AS-19) (March 1961–March 1963)
- USS Hunley (AS-31) (March 1963–July 1966 and January 1982–June 1987)
- USS Simon Lake (AS-33) (July 1966–May 1970 and June 1987–June 1992
- USS Canopus (AS-34) (May 1970–November 1975)
- USS Holland (AS-32) (November 1975–January 1982)

== Tugs assigned to SUBRON 14 ==
- Natick (YTB-760)
- Apopka (YTB-778)
- Saugus (YTB-780)
- Piqua (YTB-793)

== Service craft assigned to SUBRON 14 ==
- Los Alamos (AFDB-7) (Dry Dock)
- YFNB-31—Living/Working Barge: Boat Operations Department
- YFNB-42
- YD-245—Floating barge Crane

== Small boats ==
There was also a large number of small boats used to transport personnel and supplies from the shore to the ship. Among these small boats were 40 and 50 ft (12 and 15 m) Utility Boats, LCM Mk6 and Mk8 landing craft, some with the holds roofed over for personnel transport, and a 32 ft (9.8 m) officers motorboat. The ships' divers had a LCM Mk6 modified as a dive boat. There was also a boat known as the "Box L" of uncertain heritage.

== Polaris military tartan ==
The Polaris Military Tartan

The idea for the Polaris Military Tartan came from Captain Walter F. Schlech while he was Commodore of SUBRON 14 in the early 1960s. The design of the tartan was the work of Alexander MacIntyre of nearby Strone, Cowal. The yellow and sky blue lines are said to represent the alternating blue and gold crews of the FBM submarines. The tartan is worn by the members of the United States Naval Academy Pipes and Drums.
