= Apopka (YTB-778) =

Tugboat of the United States Navy

History

United States
- Ordered: 31 January 1964
- Builder: Marinette Marine, Marinette, Wisconsin
- Laid down: 15 October 1964
- Launched: 8 July 1965
- Acquired: 30 September 1965
- Stricken: 26 June 1996

General characteristics
- Class & type: Natick-class
- Type: Large District Harbor Tug
- Displacement: 283 long tons (288 t)
- Length: 109 ft (33 m)
- Beam: 31 ft (9.4 m)
- Draft: 14 ft (4.3 m)
- Speed: 12 knots (14 mph; 22 km/h)
- Complement: 12
- Armament: None

Apopka (YTB-778) was a United States Navy Natick-class large harbor tug named for Apopka, Florida.

== Construction ==
The contract for Apopka was awarded 31 January 1964. She was laid down on 15 October 1964 at Marinette, Wisconsin by Marinette Marine and launched 8 July 1965.

== Operational history ==
Upon entering into service, Apopka was assigned to the Atlantic Fleet. By the beginning of 1966, she had crossed the Atlantic Ocean and had begun operations at SUBRON 14, Holy Loch, Scotland. When FBM Refit Site One at Holy Loch closed in 1992, Apopka was transferred to Guantanamo Bay Naval Base.

Stricken from the Navy List 26 June 1996, ex-Apopka was transferred the Maritime Administration to be used at the James River Reserve Fleet.
