= Peter Dorschel =

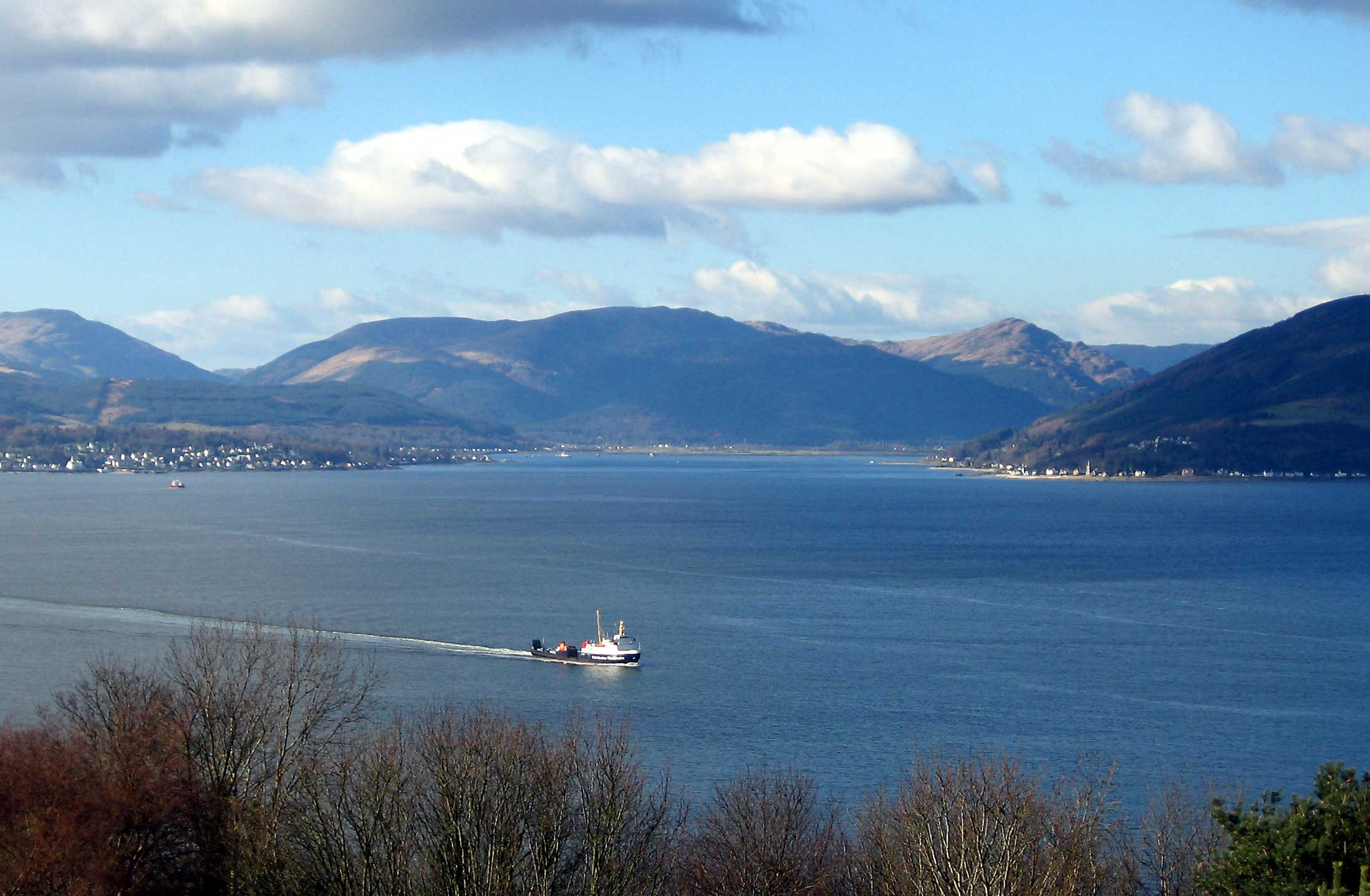
The Holy Loch seen across the Firth of Clyde from Tower Hill, Gourock, with Hunters Quay on the left, and Strone to the right

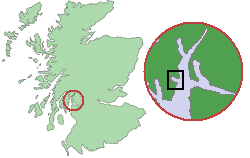
Location of the Holy Loch in Scotland

Peter Dorschel was an East German spy convicted in Scotland in June 1967 of offences contrary to the Official Secrets Act, involving the sale of information to the USSR.

== Background ==
Peter Dorschel was a ship's cook. Little is known of his background other than that he came from what was then the German Democratic Republic (East Germany) and had visited Britain on occasion prior to 1967 when employed as a seaman. He had worked legally under the English permit system and in January 1967 had married Christine, an English model, at Lübeck.

Some time prior to May 1967, and probably during his honeymoon, he had been approached in his home country by two compatriots who were operating as agents for the USSR. They proposed to provide finances enabling Dorschel to acquire a small hotel in Dunoon, Scotland, by use of which he would be able to obtain information from local US service personnel regarding fleet movements and facilities at their Polaris nuclear submarine base at the Holy Loch. The information would be passed on by Dorschel to the agents. In April, Dorschel rented a house at Hunter's Quay. This provided him with a good view of activity at the Polaris base.

== Arrest and trial ==
Dorschel was living at 10 Webster Grove, Prestwich, England, when he was arrested on 26 May 1967 in connection with his activities. Then aged 26, he was accused of inciting another man, William Alexander MacAffer (sometimes spelled McAffer), "to obtain documents which might be or were intended to be directly or indirectly useful to an enemy, for a purpose prejudicial to the safety or interests of the State." MacAffer was a 30-year-old bookmaker who lived at Argyll Street in Dunoon. Another who was involved in the conspiracy was Garry Lee Ledbetter, a US Navy shipfitter from Dexter, Missouri, US who was stationed on USS Simon Lake, the submarine tender serving the Polaris fleet at Holy Loch. Ledbetter supplied two documents to MacAffer, who in turn supplied them to Dorschel.

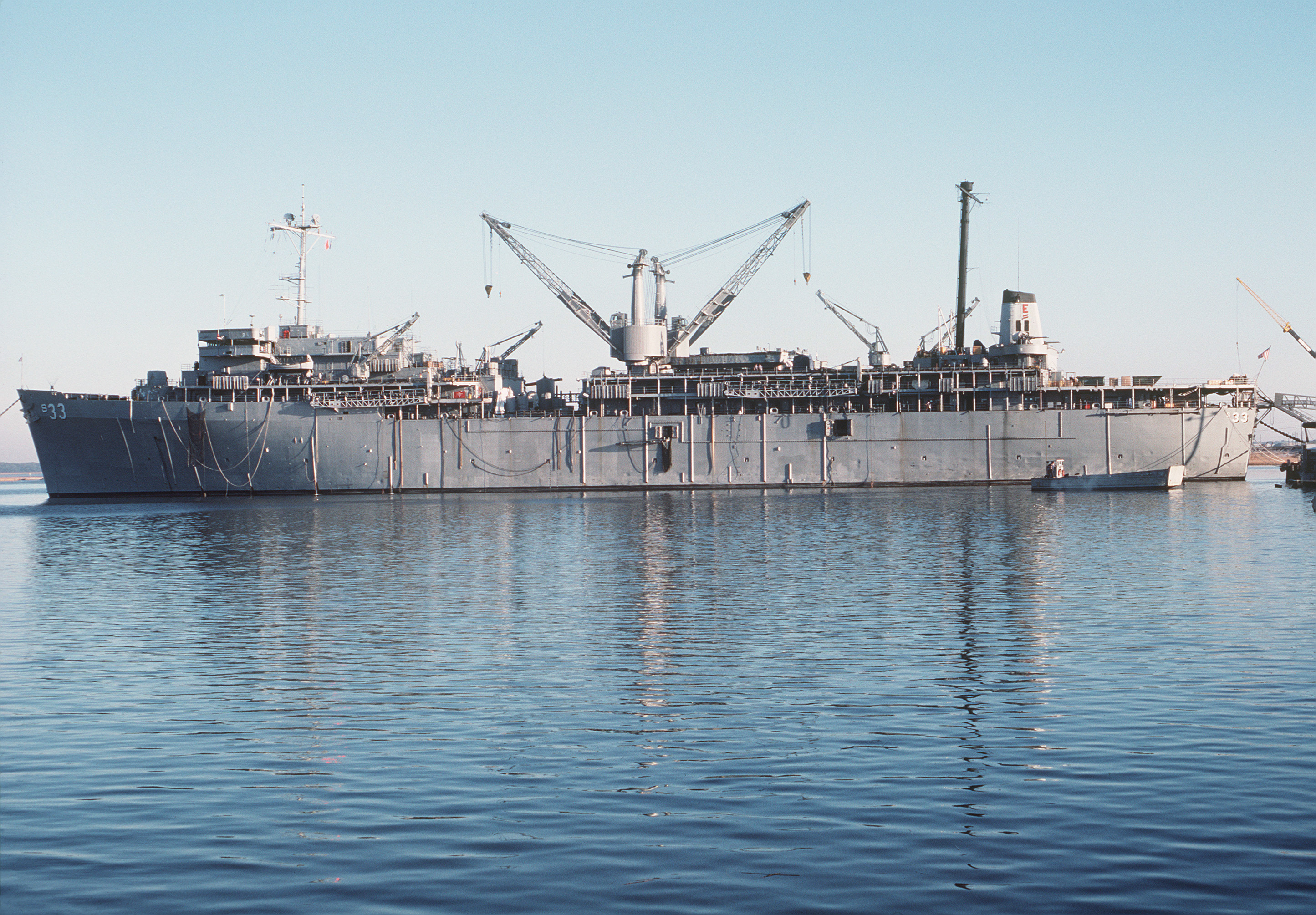
USS Simon Lake at Kings Bay in 1981

Although arrested and initially charged in Manchester, the case against Dorschel was transferred to Scotland when related arrests were made there. Dorschel pleaded guilty on 19 June 1967 at Dunoon Sheriff Court. With Nicholas Fairbairn acting in his defence at the High Court of Justiciary in Edinburgh, Dorschel was sentenced on 23 June to seven years' imprisonment. Having heard the prosecutor describe Dorschel as a probably a "little fish" and amateurish, the sentencing judge recorded that

This case, I am satisfied, is by no means as serious as some which have happened in recent years [in England]. Nevertheless, it appears that this was only through the efficient work of the security services that your activities were stopped before real tragedies occurred. I agree that you were perhaps ... a little fish in this particular sea of trouble. Nevertheless, these charges are always grave and serious ...

The Times reported that, despite the seriousness of the charge, the court hearing had been "marked by some moments of levity on the public benches and drolleries from the legal participants". One instance giving rise to this was a statement regarding Dorschel's naivety: he had been asked to supply photographs of Hythe and Poole to his spymasters and had instead sent picture postcards. Fairbairn noted that "If this is how foreign espionage in matters as important as nuclear submarines is conducted, we have little to fear from it."

== Alleged accomplices ==
Dorschel had co-operated from the outset with the investigation and Fairbairn said that he had received no training nor had any particular ideological basis for his activities. At the time of Dorschel's sentencing, the US Navy reported that investigations were still proceeding with regard to Ledbetter. Later, Ledbetter was charged by the Navy with supplying a training booklet and another unspecified document to a man and a woman. Dorschel gave evidence in camera against Ledbetter at the court martial in August 1967. MacAffer and his sister, Frances Isabella MacAffer (or Hardless], both attended but refused to supply information. Ledbetter, who had been subjected to a polygraph test, was found guilty. He was sentenced to six months' hard labour and discharged from the navy.

Although charges had been laid against MacAffer, they were dropped in September 1967. The Crown Office, who were responsible for prosecuting, said that it was unable to provide a reason for this. MacAffer, whose sister was the girlfriend of Ledbetter, then claimed that he had notified the US and British authorities of Dorschel's initial approach to him and had been trying to trap Dorschel since that time. He also claimed that he had been told there were six East Germans involved in the spy ring. Official bodies of both countries denied his claims of co-operation. MacAffer faced further charges in October 1967, relating to alleged avoidance of customs duty and illegal off-course bookmaking that had been discovered in May.

== Later events ==
Dorschel was released in January 1970 and deported to West Germany. Later in that year, his wife, Christine, who had been aged 21 at the time of the trial and had promised to "stand by" him, divorced him on the grounds of cruelty. In granting the decree nisi, the judge chose to overlook her admitted adultery. She said at the time of the divorce that she thought Dorschel was possibly serving in the merchant navy of the USSR.
