= Saugus (YTB-780) =

Tugboat of the United States Navy

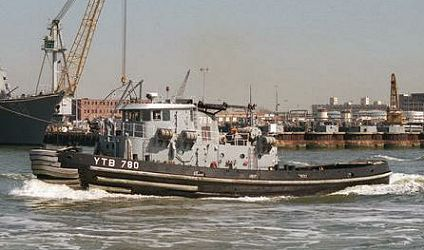
- USS Saugus

History

United States
- Ordered: 31 January 1964
- Builder: Marinette Marine Corporation, Marinette, Wisconsin
- Laid down: 8 December 1964
- Launched: 3 August 1965
- In service: 10 November 1965
- Stricken: 28 October 1997
- Identification: IMO number: 9068160; MMSI number: 368020030; Callsign: WDJ8810
- Fate: Sold into commercial service, 17 May 2000

General characteristics
- Class & type: Natick-class large harbor tug
- Displacement: 283 long tons (288 t) (lt) 356 long tons (362 t) (full)
- Length: 109 ft (33 m)
- Beam: 29 ft (8.8 m)
- Draft: 13 ft (4.0 m)
- Propulsion: diesel engine, single screw
- Speed: 12 knots (14 mph; 22 km/h)
- Complement: 12
- Armament: None

Saugus (YTB-780) was a United States Navy Natick-class large harbor tug. Named for Saugus, Massachusetts, she was the third U.S. Naval vessel to bear the name.

== Construction ==
The contract for Saugus was awarded 31 January 1964. She was laid down on 8 December 1964 at Marinette, Wisconsin, by Marinette Marine and launched 3 August 1965.

== Operational history ==
Saugus was delivered and placed in service at Boston on 10 November 1965. Designated for service overseas, she arrived in Holy Loch, Scotland on 12 March 1966 to provide tug services for SUBRON 14.

Stricken from the Navy Directory on 28 October 1997, Saugus was sold on 17 May 2000 into commercial service.
