= Dunoon Sheriff Court =

Judicial building in Dunoon, Scotland

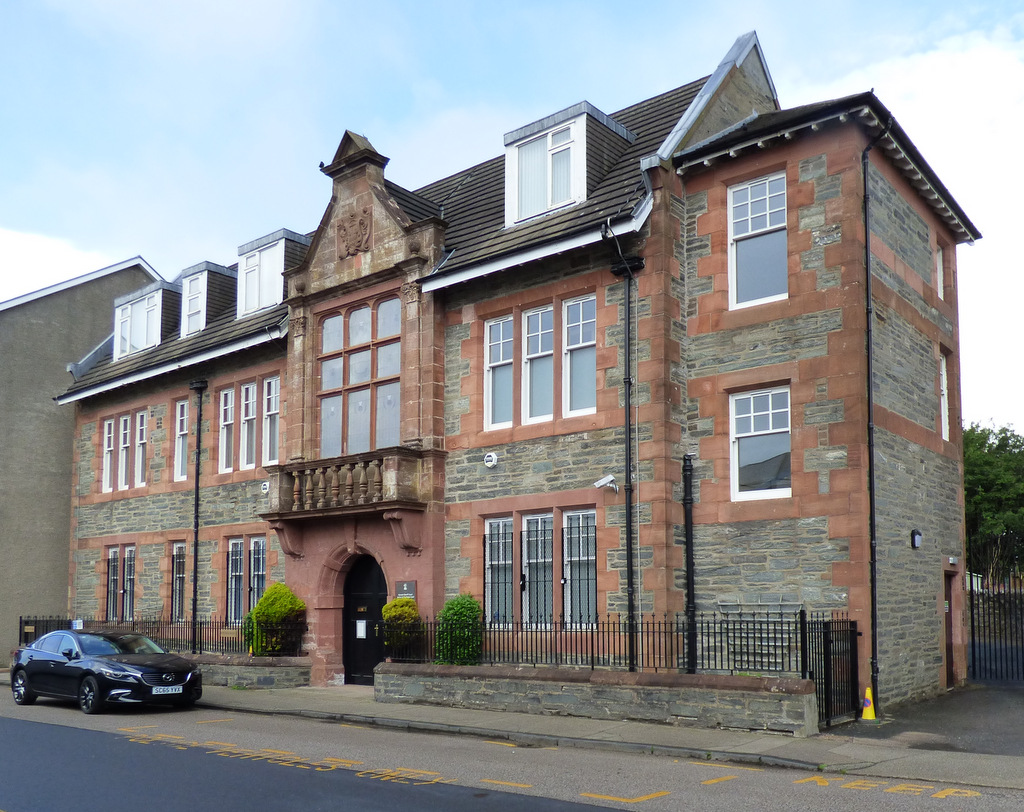
- The building in 2019

- Shown within Argyll and Bute
- 55.9506°N 4.9263°W
- Location: George Street, Dunoon

History
- Built: 1900

Site notes
- Architect(s): John McKissack and Son
- Architectural style: Renaissance Revival style

Listed Building – Category C(S)
- Official name: Dunoon Sheriff Court and Justice of the Peace Court, George Street, Dunoon
- Designated: 11 September 2015
- Reference no.: LB52359

Dunoon Sheriff Court is a judicial building on George Street in Dunoon, Argyll and Bute in Scotland. The building, which continues to be used as a courthouse, is a Category C listed building.

== History ==
During the last quarter of the 19th century, court hearings took place at Dunoon Burgh Hall in Argyll Street. However, in the late-19th century, court officials decided that a dedicated courthouse was needed: the site they chose was on the west side of George Street. The building was designed by John McKissack and Son in the Renaissance Revival style, built in Whinstone rubble masonry and was completed in 1900.

The design involved an asymmetrical main frontage of six bays facing onto George Street. The fourth bay featured a large round headed doorway with a keystone flanked by brackets supporting a balustraded balcony. There was a prominent mullioned and transomed stained glass window on the first floor, which was flanked by Ionic order pilasters supporting a cornice, and surmounted by a pediment containing the burgh coat of arms. The first and third bays were fenestrated with bipartite mullioned windows on the ground floor and by tripartite mullioned windows on the first floor, while the second bay was fenestrated with single windows on both floors, and the fifth bay was fenestrated by tripartite mullioned windows on both floors. The right-hand bay, which was slightly recessed and enclosed the stairwell, contained sash windows on both floors. At roof level, there was a modillioned cornice. Internally, the principal rooms were the courtroom on the first floor, which featured a finely carved bench and raked seating, and three prison cells.

During the 1960s, the court held a series of hearings associated with the Polaris nuclear submarine base at Holy Loch. After a US depot ship arrived there in February 1961, a large number of demonstrators were arrested, and, by October 1961, some 321 protestors had appeared before Dunoon Sheriff Court: the vast majority were found guilty and fined. Then, in June 1967, the court was the venue for the opening stages of the trial of the East German spy, Peter Dorschel, who was accused of selling information relating to naval movements at the base to the Soviet Union. After he pleaded guilty at Dunoon Sheriff Court, he was referred to the High Court of Justiciary in Edinburgh, where he was sentenced to seven years' imprisonment.

Following a nationwide review of all Scottish court buildings, Historic Environment Scotland listed the building at Category C in 2015. The building continues to serve as the venue for sheriff court hearings in the area.

== See also ==
- List of listed buildings in Dunoon
