= Hunley-class submarine tender =

American naval vessel (1962–1996)

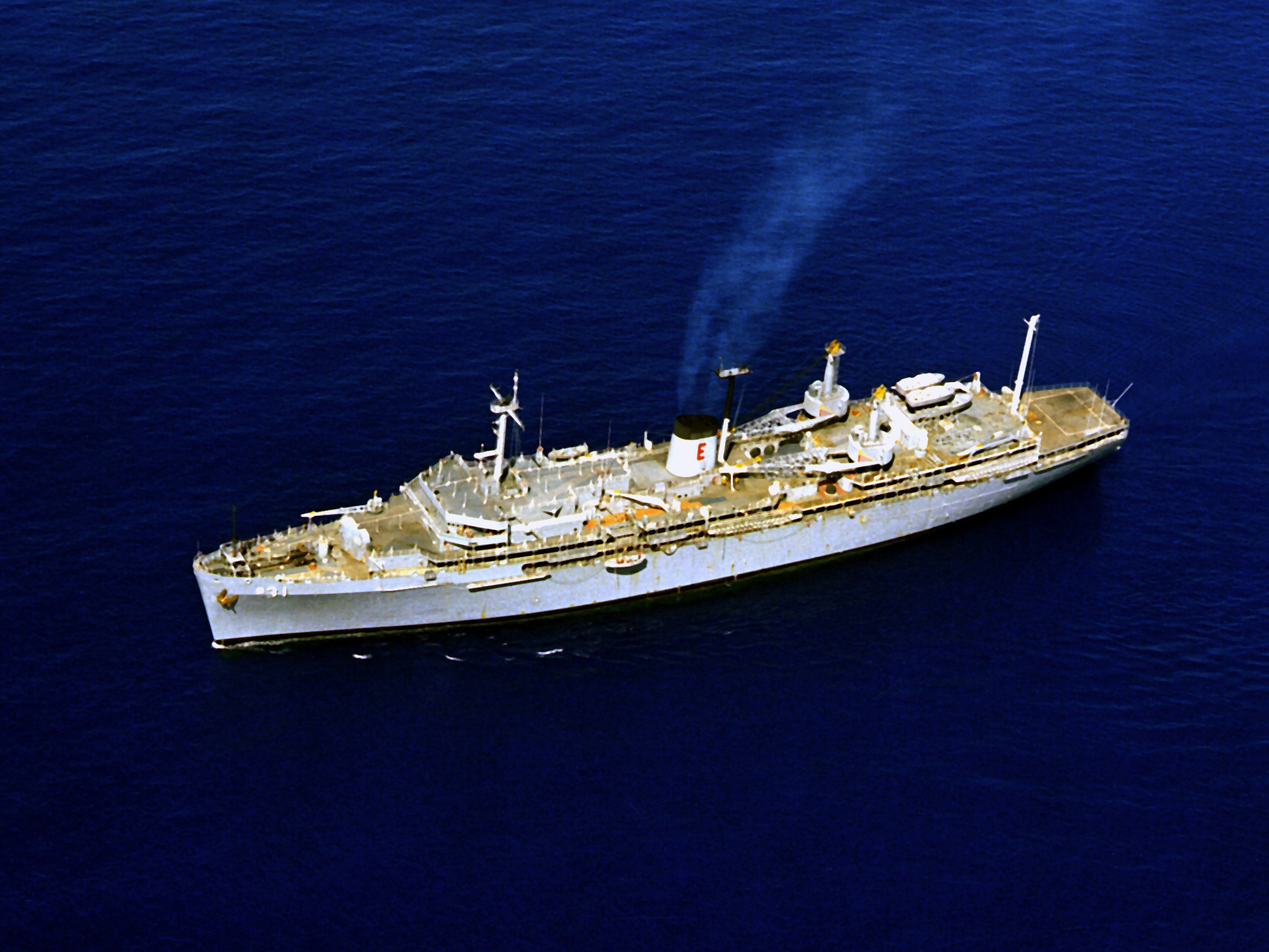

Class overview
- Name: Hunley-class submarine tender
- Operators: United States Navy
- Preceded by: USS Proteus (AS-19)
- Succeeded by: Simon Lake class
- Built: 1960 - 1963
- In commission: 1962 - 1996
- Completed: 2
- Scrapped: 2

General characteristics
- Type: Submarine tender
- Displacement: 19,000 tons
- Length: 599 ft (183 m)
- Beam: 83 ft (25 m)
- Draft: 23 ft 4 in (7.11 m)
- Propulsion: Diesel–electric, 15.000 SHP
- Speed: 18 kn (33 km/h)
- Complement: 58 Officers, 1.023 Enlisted
- Armament: 4 × 3 inch/50 caliber guns

The Hunley-class was a class of two submarine tenders in service with the United States Navy from 1962 to 1996.

== History ==
The Hunley-class was the first class of submarine tenders in the U.S. Navy being built from the keel up to service ballistic missile submarines (SSBN). The early generations of SSBNs were equipped with the UGM-27 Polaris missile. To handle these missiles, a large 32 ton crane was installed aft that moved in a large circle. In 1973-1975 both ships were converted to handle the newer UGM-73 Poseidon missile. The massive crane was then replaced by two smaller ones. The ships were powered by ten Diesel engines, delivering 15.000 SHP on one shaft. Both tenders were decommissioned following the retirement of the Poseidon-equipped SSBNs. After spending at least a decade in the Reserve Fleet, both ships were scrapped.

== Ships ==
Name	Number	Builder	Launched	Commissioned	Decommissioned	Status	DANFS	NVR
Hunley	AS-31	Newport News Shipbuilding	28 September 1961	16 June 1962	30 September 1994	Sold for scrap 5 January 2007		
Holland	AS-32	Ingalls Shipbuilding	19 January 1963	7 September 1963	30 September 1996	Sold for scrap 18 July 2013		
