= USS Simon Lake =

Tender of the United States Navy

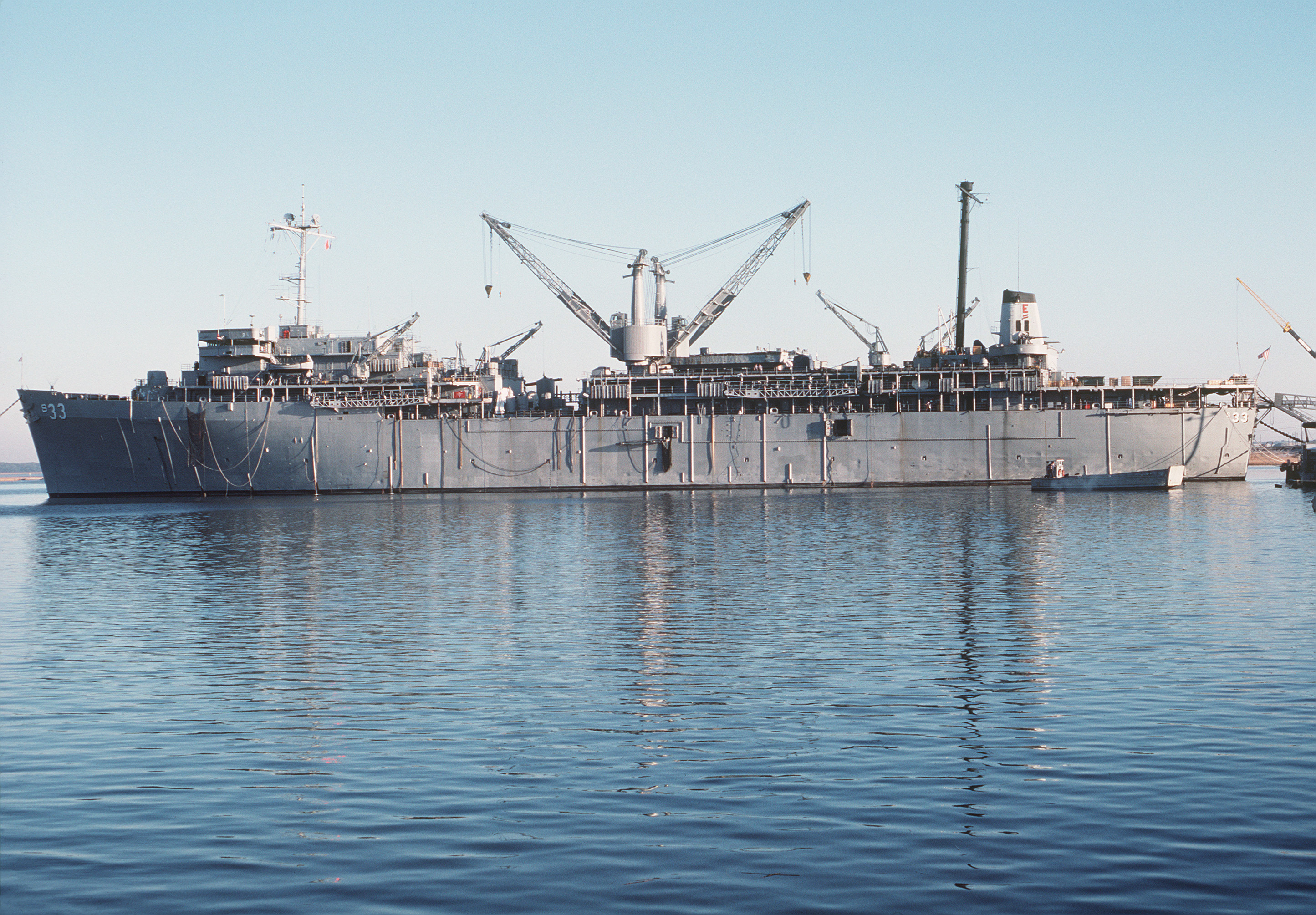
- Simon Lake at Kings Bay in 1981

History

United States
- Name: USS Simon Lake
- Namesake: Simon Lake
- Builder: Puget Sound Naval Shipyard, Bremerton, Washington
- Laid down: 7 January 1963
- Launched: 8 February 1964
- Commissioned: 7 November 1964
- Decommissioned: 31 July 1999
- Fate: Transferred from Norfolk Naval Shipyard, Portsmouth, Virginia to National Defense Reserve Fleet, James River 2015, scrapped 27 February 2019

General characteristics
- Class & type: Simon Lake-class submarine tender
- Displacement: 12,686 long tons (12,890 t)
- Length: 644 ft (196 m)
- Beam: 85 ft (26 m)
- Draft: 30 ft (9.1 m)
- Propulsion: 2 boilers, steam turbine, single shaft
- Speed: 20 knots (37 km/h; 23 mph)
- Complement: 1,420
- Armament: 4 × 25 mm Mk38 cannon; 2 × 40 mm grenade launchers; 2 × .50 caliber guns

USS Simon Lake (AS-33) was the lead ship of her class of submarine tenders in the United States Navy, named for Simon Lake, a pioneering designer of early submarines.

The ship was laid down on 7 January 1963 by the Puget Sound Naval Shipyard, Bremerton, Washington, launched on 8 February 1964, sponsored by Mrs. Cecil Ford and Mrs. Herbert Diamond, and commissioned on 7 November 1964.

== Service history ==
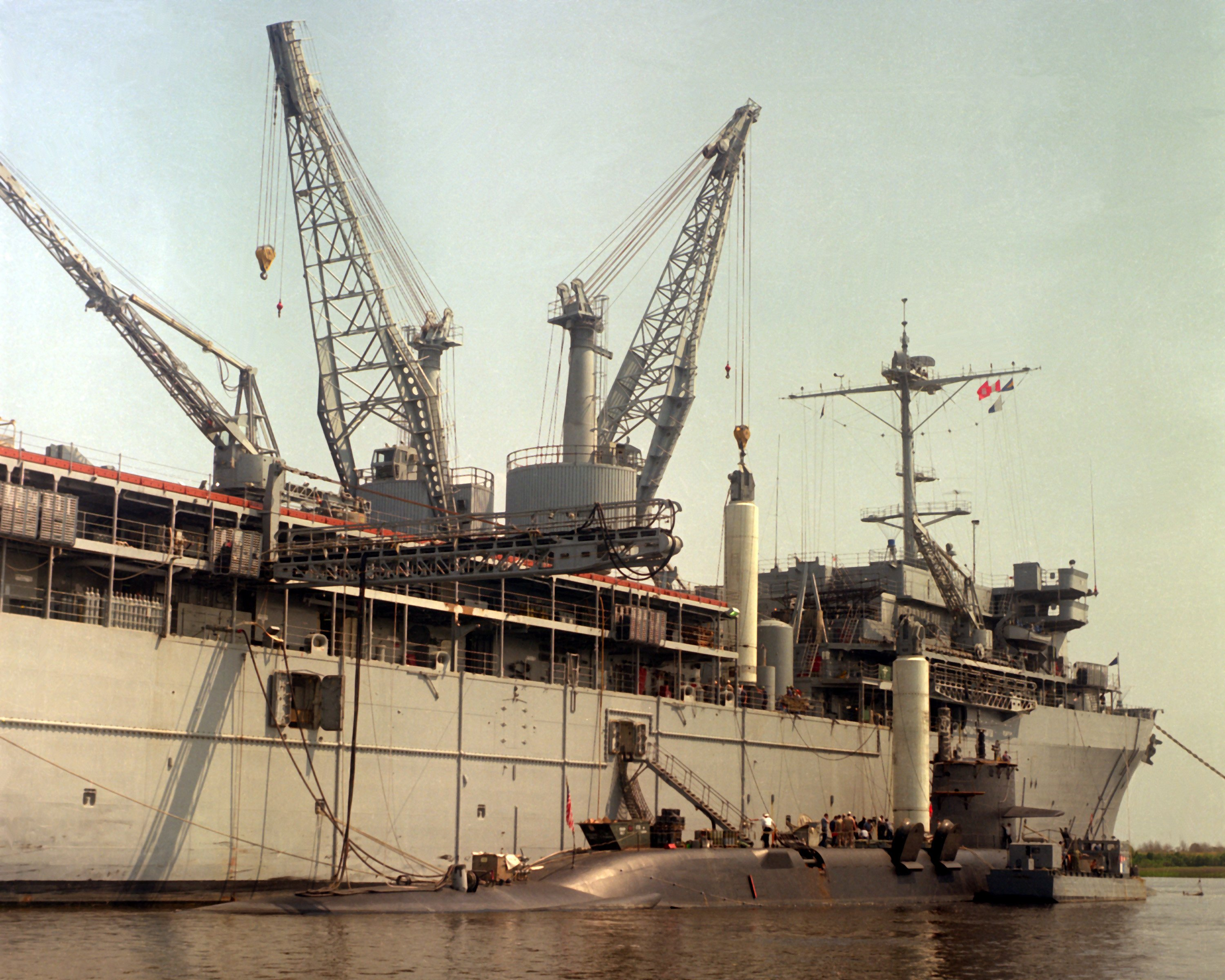
The submarine USS Francis Scott Key taking on Trident C-4 missiles from USS Simon Lake at Kings Bay, Georgia, on 2 October 1981

Simon Lake sailed from Bremerton on 16 January 1965 for Pearl Harbor on her shakedown cruise and returned to Bremerton on 17 February for a six-week yard availability period. The Polaris submarine tender stood out of Bremerton on 16 April and proceeded to Charleston, South Carolina, via the Panama Canal.

Simon Lake arrived at Charleston on 1 May and tended submarines there until 11 July 1966. On that date, she sailed for Holy Loch, Scotland, where she relieved USS Hunley as tender for Submarine Squadron 14. She operated from there until 24 May 1970, when she got underway for Charleston. In June, she sailed for Bremerton for her first overhaul since commissioning. The tender was in the yard from 6 July 1970 to March 1971 and while there was also converted to Poseidon missile capability.

Simon Lake returned to Charleston on 3 April and tended submarines there until 19 November 1972, when she sailed for Rota, Spain, as the relief for USS Holland.

Simon Lake arrived at the Charleston Naval Shipyard in North Charleston, South Carolina, January 1977 for extensive overhaul in one of the three drydocks. Over a year later, the drydock was flooded, the heavy ICBM missile cranes were weight tested, and the ship sent out on a shakedown" cruise.

Simon Lake was the first submarine tender to be stationed at Kings Bay, Georgia, in 1979, when the base first opened and was the first tender on the East Coast on which women served in the U.S. Navy. After Refresher Training in Guantanamo Bay, Cuba, Simon Lake assumed duties tending submarines at the Naval Weapons Station, Goose Creek, South Carolina. In June 1979, USS Canopus relieved Simon Lake at the Naval Weapons Station Charleston, South Carolina.

From 1979-1985, Simon Lake serviced submarines in Kings Bay, Georgia, where she also won two Battle Efficiency 'E' awards. In September 1985, she was driven to Ingalls Shipyard in Pascagoula, Mississippi, where she received a stem-to-stern, inside-and-out, grind-to-bare metal, and repaint; a replacement of the helicopter deck; repair of the two 3-inch/50 rear-facing guns; and the addition of a 25 mm Mk38 chain gun weapons system. She was relaunched in September 1986, when she did a short shakedown cruise to Guantanamo Bay until December 1986 returned to Charleston, South Carolina, for a brief stopover to take on supplies before heading off to Holy Loch, Scotland, in May 1987.

In May 1987, Simon Lake returned to Scotland to again relieve USS Hunley at Holy Loch, where in 1988 and 1991, she won Battle Efficiency 'E' awards. She remained on station there until the base was closed and all assets withdrawn in 1992. Sailing for Norfolk, Virginia, that March, Simon Lake drew to a close 30 years of US Navy presence in Holy Loch, Scotland.

In March 1992, Simon Lake participated in Teamwork '92, a joint North Atlantic operation and conducted repairs to USS La Moure County (LST-1194) in Trondheim, Norway. Upon departure, she crossed the Arctic Circle to perform the Order of the Bluenose for the crew, and stopped for a port call in Halifax, Nova Scotia, prior to returning to Norfolk to conduct an extensive overhaul, converting from a ballistic missile submarine tender to an attack submarine tender. After completion of the overhaul and a visit to Palma, Spain, in March 1993, she arrived at her new homeport of La Maddalena, Italy, where she relieved USS Orion. For superior service to the fleet, she received the Battle Efficiency 'E' award, Weapons Black "W", and Meritorious Unit Commendation awards for the period 7 July 1993 to 31 August 1994.

In March 1998, the ship transited the Suez Canal to the United Arab Emirates, where she supported Operation Southern Watch in the Persian Gulf. The vessel's performance in this period led to her receiving the Navy Unit Commendation and Armed Forces Expeditionary Medal. In June 1998, she returned to La Maddalena, Italy.

Simon Lake's performance during her last two years of service was particularly noteworthy. Not only did she receive the awards associated with the Persian Gulf, but also she was nominated for the Secretary of Defense Maintenance Award, received the 1997 and 1998 Battle Efficiency 'E' awards, the 1998 Chief of Naval Operations safety award, and the 1998 Golden Anchor award, and became the first surface ship to receive both the Enlisted Surface Warfare and the Surface Warfare Officer pennants.

After being relieved by USS Emory S. Land, Simon Lake departed La Maddalena on 11 May 1999 and crossed the Atlantic for Norfolk, Virginia to be decommissioned.

Simon Lake was decommissioned on 31 July 1999, and into 2008 was in the mothball fleet in Philadelphia. Simon Lake was placed out of service at Norfolk Naval Shipyards in Portsmouth, Virginia, as part of the Naval Inactive Ship Maintenance Facility's inventory.

Simon Lake departed Norfolk Naval Shipyard on 5 February 2015. Beginning in September 2011, Simon Lake underwent the deactivation process in preparation for dismantling. The ship was placed in the James River Reserve Fleet on 3 December 2015 in the care of the U. S. Maritime Administration to await recycling. She arrived at Steelcoast (ex-ESCO Marine) in Brownsville, Texas, for ship recycling on 27 February 2019.

== Awards ==
Simon Lake earned numerous awards, including seven Navy E Ribbons, one Navy Unit Commendation, and seven Meritorious Unit Commendations.

- 1998-06-10 - 1998-12-10 – Meritorious Unit Commendation - awarded to units assigned to 6th Fleet Battle Force
- 1998-04-01 - 1998-06-04 – Armed Forces Expeditionary Medal
- 1997-10-01 - 1998-09-30 – Navy E Ribbon
- 1997-10-01 - 1998-04-30 – Navy Unit Commendation
- 1996-10-01 - 1997-09-30 – Navy E Ribbon
- 1993-07-07 - 1994-08-31 – Meritorious Unit Commendation
- 1993-04-06 - 1997-04-11 – Armed Forces Service Medal
- 1990-10-01 - 1991-09-30 – Navy E Ribbon
- 1989-04-01 - 1989-05-20 – Secretary of the Navy Letter of Commendation - COOPEX 1-89
- 1989-01-01 - 1992-06-01 – Meritorious Unit Commendation - awarded to units assigned to Submarine Squadron 14
- 1987-06-01 - 1988-12-31 – Meritorious Unit Commendation - awarded to units assigned to Submarine Squadron 14
- 1987-06-01 - 1988-12-31 – Meritorious Unit Commendation - awarded to USMC detachment assigned to USS Simon Lake (AS-33)
- 1987-06-01 - 1988-12-31 – Meritorious Unit Commendation - awarded to units assigned to NSA Holy Lock
- 1984-10-01 - 1985-09-30 – Navy E Ribbon
- 1984-02-01 - 1985-10-01 – Meritorious Unit Commendation
- 1983-10-01 - 1984-09-30 – Navy E Ribbon
- 1981-10-01 - 1982-09-30 – Navy E Ribbon
- 1980-01-01 - 1984-02-01 – Meritorious Unit Commendation
- 1975-07-01 - 1976-08-12 – Meritorious Unit Commendation
- 1975-07-01 - 1976-09-30 – Navy E Ribbon

== See also ==
- Peter Dorschel
