= USS Canopus (AS-34) =

Tender of the United States Navy

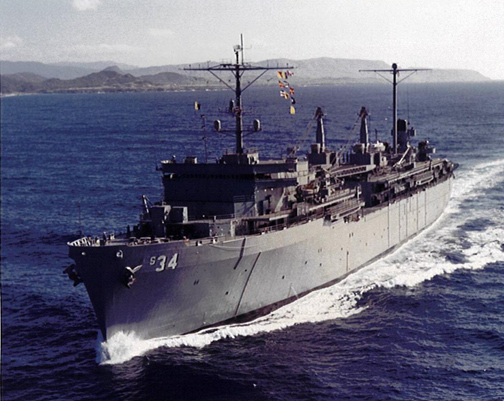
- USS Canopus (AS-34)

History

United States
- Name: Canopus
- Namesake: Canopus
- Builder: Ingalls Shipbuilding, Pascagoula, Mississippi
- Laid down: 2 March 1964
- Launched: 12 February 1965
- Acquired: 25 October 1965
- Commissioned: 4 November 1965
- Decommissioned: 7 October 1994
- Stricken: 3 May 1995
- Identification: IMO number: 8628353
- Fate: Disposed at Able Shipyard, Teesside, UK, 2010

General characteristics
- Class & type: Simon Lake-class submarine tender
- Displacement: 12,686 long tons (12,890 t)
- Length: 644 ft (196 m)
- Beam: 85 ft (26 m)
- Draft: 30 ft (9.1 m)
- Propulsion: 2 boilers, steam turbine, single shaft
- Speed: 20 knots (37 km/h; 23 mph)
- Complement: 1,420
- Armament: 4 × 3"/50 caliber gun mounts

USS Canopus (AS-34) was a Simon Lake-class submarine tender of the United States Navy, operational from 1965 to 1994. The vessel was used to repair and refit submarine-launched Polaris nuclear-armed ballistic missiles and the submarines that deployed with them. The vessel primarily served US naval bases on the US Atlantic Coast and in Europe. In 1969, the ship was overhauled to maintain the new Poseidon Missile Systems. Taken out of service in 1995, the US Navy's intent to have the ship broken up for scrap in the United Kingdom was controversial. By 2010 demolition had been completed.

== Construction ==
Canopus's keel was laid on 2 March 1964 and she was launched on 12 February 1965, at Ingalls Shipbuilding Corporation in Pascagoula, Mississippi. Canopus was completed and delivered to the Navy in record breaking time on 25 October 1965.

Canopus joined Submarine Squadron 18 at Charleston and was commissioned on 4 November 1965. After a short outfitting period, Canopus sailed for the Caribbean on 7 January 1966. Canopus visited Guantánamo Bay, Cuba, for shakedown training. She returned to Charleston Naval Shipyard on 24 February for the usual post-shakedown work.

In mid-April 1966, Canopus completed her acceptance trials and upon final loading and outfitting deployed to the Cooper River FBM Replenishment Site on 24 June. Canopus started refitting submarines of Squadron 18.

== Service history ==
=== 1960s ===
On 24 September 1966, Canopus deployed from Charleston, South Carolina, arriving in Rota, Spain, on 10 October. Canopus relieved Holland and reported to the Commander of Submarine Squadron 16 for duty. While at Rota, Canopus accomplished more Polaris refits than any other submarine tender in a comparable amount of time.

On 20 April 1969, Canopus was relieved by Holland and sailed for Bremerton, Washington, via the Panama Canal. In Bremerton, Canopus was extensively overhauled and thereby gained the title of the first submarine tender in the United States Navy capable of refitting and maintaining a submarine with the Poseidon Missile System.

=== 1970s ===
After completion of this overhaul, Canopus sailed for Holy Loch, Scotland, via the Panama Canal. In May 1970, she relieved Simon Lake at Holy Loch. She reported to the Commander of Submarine Squadron 14.

On 29 November 1970, a fire broke out in the CPO baggage room, killing three and injuring ten. The fatalities (all from smoke inhalation) were two prisoners, and the guard who had freed them from the brig.

Canopus remained in Holy Loch until November 1975. During this time, Canopus was instrumental in establishing several new maintenance concepts while completing, on schedule, every submarine refit during the 67 months at Holy Loch. During the last year at Holy Loch, Canopus received numerous awards including the Ney Award for the best large mess afloat, the second consecutive Battle Efficiency "E", the CINCLANTFLT Golden Anchor Award for personnel retention, and the Navy Unit Commendation for her role in the first FBM Submarine Extended Refit Period.

In 1976, Canopus underwent an extensive refit at Charleston Naval Shipyard and returned to Guantanamo Bay, Cuba, for refresher training. Canopus returned to Rota, Spain, in December 1976.

As a result of the shipyard overhaul in Charleston, Canopus brought new and improved capabilities to Rota for the support of Submarine Squadron 16.

In June 1979, Canopus relieved Simon Lake at the Naval Weapons Station Charleston, South Carolina. Canopus now reported to the Commander of Squadron 18.

=== 1980s ===
In January 1980, Canopus went 200 miles (320 km) off the coast to conduct drills. In March 1980, Canopus made a liberty cruise to Cape Canaveral, Florida.

In 1984 after being relieved by Holland, Canopus underwent an overhaul at Charleston Naval Shipyard - which lasted until 1985. Refresher training and shake-down was conducted out of Guantanamo Bay, Cuba. After a short stay at Charleston, Canopus sailed in July 1985 to Naval Submarine Base Kings Bay, Georgia, where she relieved Simon Lake - assuming upkeep and refit duties for the SSBNs of Subron 16.

== Decommissioning ==
Canopus was located at Kings Bay during the early 1990s. During a ceremony held at the Warrior Wharf there on 7 October 1994, Canopus' 29 years of service was celebrated; and she was decommissioned from active service.

Plans to scrap the vessel in the United Kingdom ran into controversy in view of the risks posed by toxic chemicals and asbestos.

Canopus was scrapped at Able UK in Hartlepool.
