= USS Holland (AS-32) =

Tender of the United States Navy

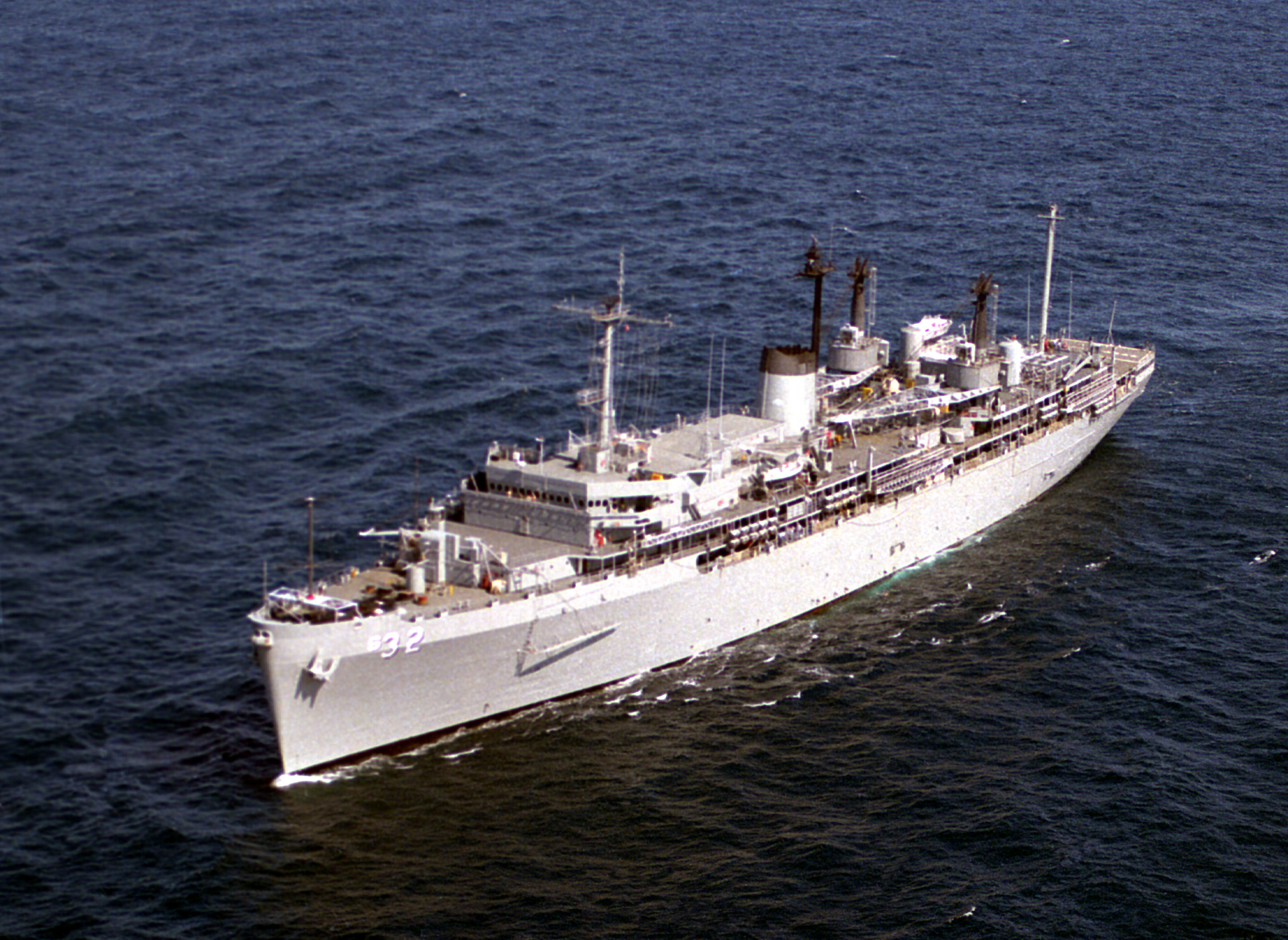
- USS Holland (AS-32)

History

United States
- Name: USS Holland (AS-32)
- Namesake: John Philip Holland
- Awarded: 31 August 1961
- Builder: Ingalls Shipbuilding Company
- Laid down: 5 March 1962
- Launched: 19 January 1963
- Acquired: 30 August 1963
- Commissioned: 7 September 1963
- Decommissioned: 30 September 1996
- Stricken: 12 May 2000
- Fate: Sold for scrap 18 July 2013

General characteristics
- Class & type: Hunley-class submarine tender
- Displacement: 19,000 tons
- Length: 599 ft (183 m)
- Beam: 83 ft (25 m)
- Draft: 23 ft 4 in (7.11 m)
- Speed: 18 knots
- Complement: 1,190

USS Holland was a submarine tender in service with the United States Navy from 1963 to 1996.

== History ==
USS Holland (AS-32) was a Hunley-class submarine tender launched by the Ingalls Shipbuilding Company in Pascagoula, Mississippi on 19 January 1963. The first ever built specifically to service fleet ballistic missile submarines (SSBNs), she was sponsored by Mrs. John C. Stennis, wife of US Senator John C. Stennis and delivered to the Charleston Naval Shipyard, Charleston, South Carolina. Holland was commissioned on 7 September 1963.

Holland departed Charleston on 14 October for shakedown training at Guantanamo Bay, Cuba, returning to Charleston on 19 November. She commenced post-shakedown availability on 25 November.

While Holland was neither a submersible nor a combatant ship, she was a vital link in support of the United States first line of deterrence, the Navy's Polaris missile. She contained a complete machine shop and was capable of making any submarine repair other than major overhaul, including servicing and maintaining the nuclear power plants of Polaris-equipped submarines.

The opening of 1964 found Holland at Charleston, South Carolina, making preparations for deployment to the Polaris replenishment anchorage at Rota, Spain. She arrived in Rota 1 April and relieved Proteus (AS-19) as the fleet submarine tender shortly thereafter. Holland continued her service to the Polaris submarines until relieved 4 November 1966. Holland arrived at Charleston 22 November. There, she tended submarines of the Atlantic Fleet into 1969. In March of that year she returned to Rota for another tour of duty. In January 1973 Holland returned to Charleston, South Carolina.

From November 1974 to June 1975 Holland underwent a conversion overhaul at the Puget Sound Naval Shipyard in Bremerton, Washington to enable her to support submarines equipped with Poseidon missiles.

From November 1975 to January 1982 she served Submarine Squadron 14 at Holy Loch, Scotland. She was a key contributor along with Irish, British and other naval ships in the rescue of racing yachts caught in a severe storm during the 1979 Fastnet Race.

Holland was decommissioned on 30 September 1996 and moored with the Reserve Fleet in Suisun Bay near San Francisco, California, and on 10 July 2013 was moved into dry dock at Mare Island for cleaning before being towed to Texas for scrapping. She has since been disassembled.

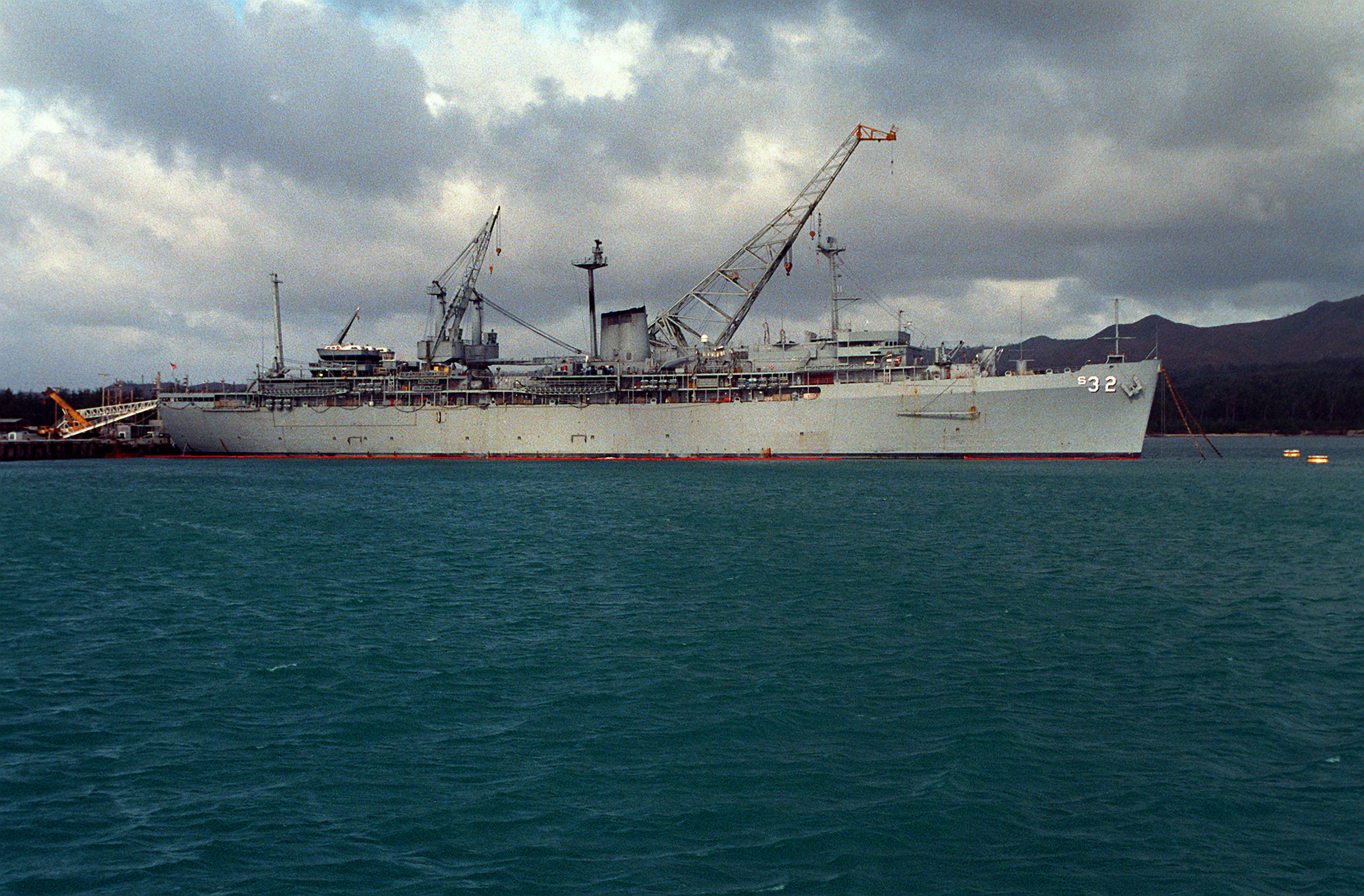
USS Holland at Apra Harbor, Guam, in 1993.

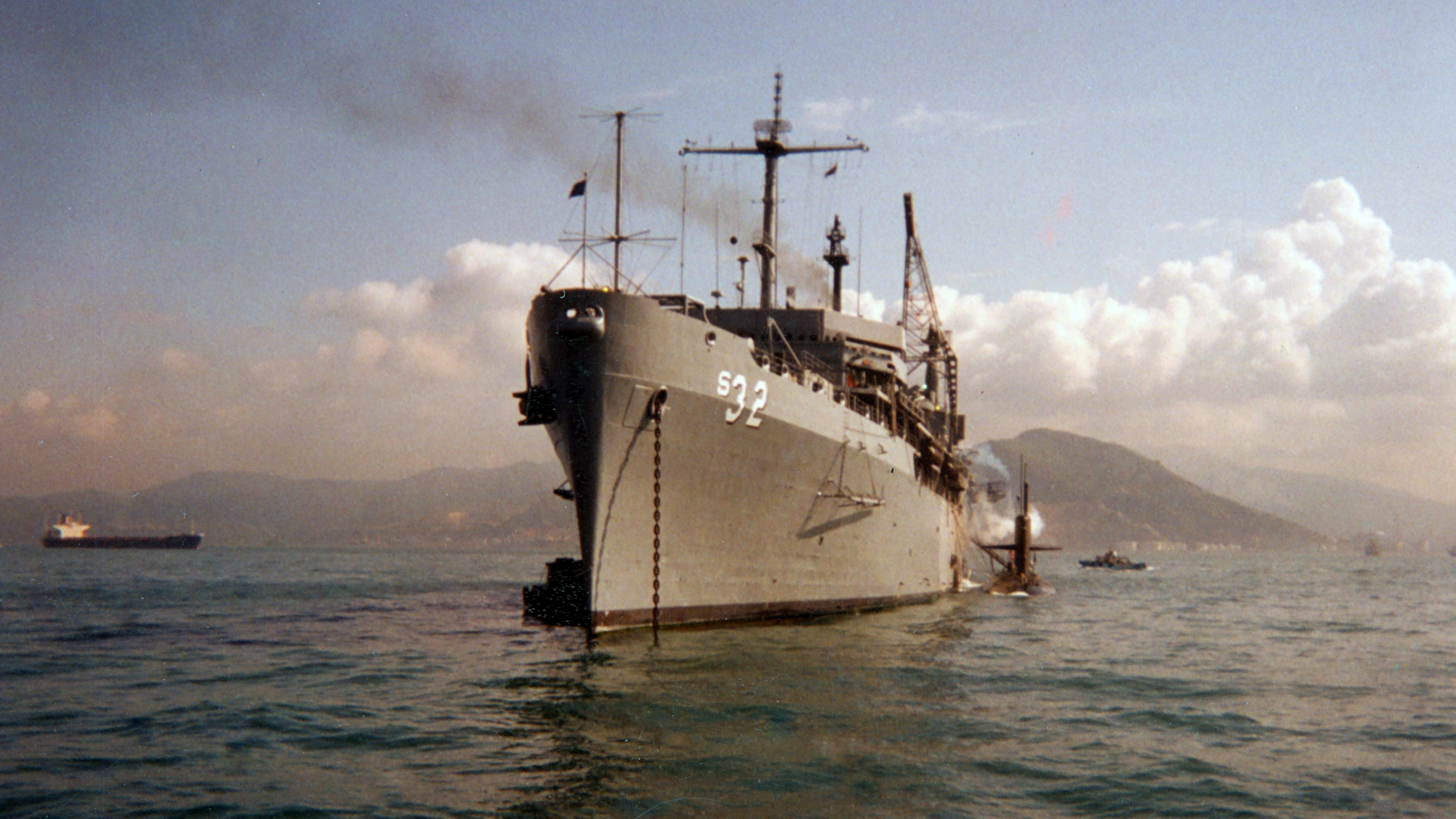
USS Holland at Hong Kong in 1993.
