= USS Proteus (AS-19) =

US Navy submarine tender

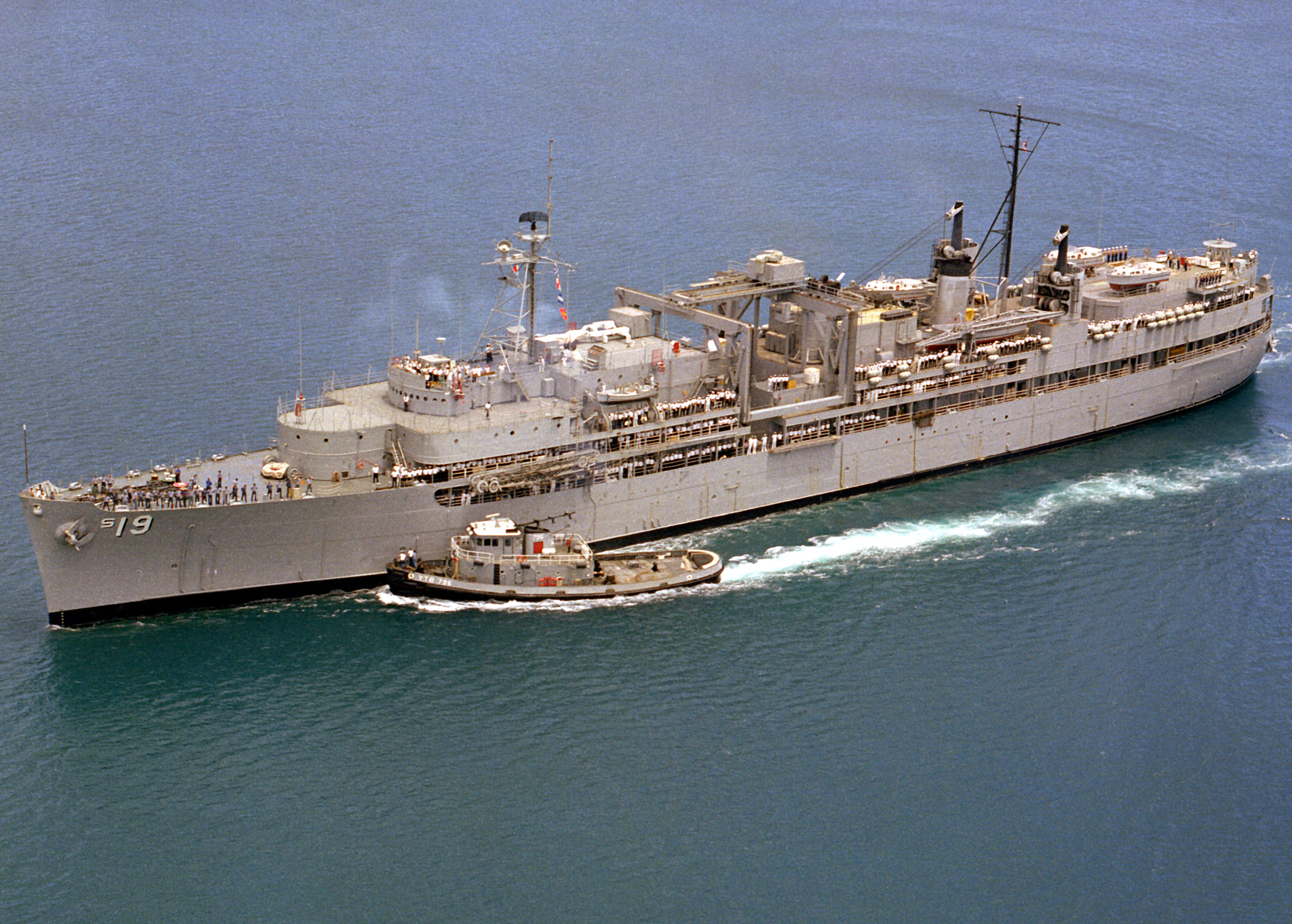
- USS Proteus (AS-19) in 1980

History

United States
- Namesake: Proteus
- Builder: Moore Dry Dock Company
- Laid down: 15 September 1941
- Launched: 12 November 1942
- Commissioned: 31 January 1944
- Decommissioned: 26 September 1947
- Recommissioned: 8 July 1960
- Decommissioned: September 1992
- Recommissioned: 1994, reclassified IX-518
- Decommissioned: September 1999
- Stricken: 13 March 2001
- Fate: Scrapped, 2007

General characteristics (as built)
- Class & type: Fulton-class submarine tender
- Displacement: 9,734 long tons (9,890 t)
- Length: 529 ft 6 in (161.39 m)
- Beam: 73 ft 4 in (22.35 m)
- Propulsion: diesel-electric
- Speed: 18.5 knots (34.3 km/h; 21.3 mph)
- Complement: 1,487
- Armament: 4 × 5"/38 caliber guns; 8 × 40 mm guns; 23 × 20 mm guns

The third USS Proteus (AS-19) was a Fulton-class submarine tender in the United States Navy.

== Construction and commissioning ==
Proteus was laid down by the Moore Shipbuilding and Dry Dock Company, Oakland, California, 15 September 1941; launched 12 November 1942; sponsored by Mrs. Charles M. Cooke, Jr.; and commissioned 31 January 1944.

== Service history ==
=== 1944–1959 ===
After shakedown off San Diego, she stood out of San Francisco on 19 March for Midway to tend submarines of Submarine Squadron 20. She arrived 3 May, and operated there until 1 December completing 51 voyage repairs and 14 refits for submarines. She returned to Pearl Harbor 4 December, and on 5 February got underway for Guam where she completed 4 voyage repairs and 24 refits by 7 August.

Assigned to occupation duty after the end of the war, Proteus rendezvoused with units of the 3rd Fleet and became the flagship of a 26-ship support group which steamed off the coast of Honshū until 26 August. On the 28th she anchored in Sagami Wan to begin supporting Submarine Squadron 20 as it demilitarized surrendered Japanese submarines, human torpedoes, torpedo carrying boats, and suicide boats at Yokosuka and other locations in the Sagami Wan-Tokyo Bay areas. Future actors Tony Curtis – whose birth name was Bernard Schwartz – and Larry Storch were aboard Proteus at Tokyo Bay in August–September 1945 – and watched much of the formal surrender activities aboard USS Missouri from Proteus's signal bridge.

Also assigned to repair Japanese submarines, she remained until 1 November, when she headed home.

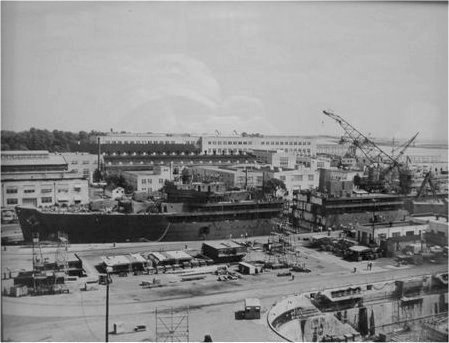
USS Proteus being lengthened at Charleston in 1959.

Transiting the Panama Canal on 6 December, she reached New London 16 December. A trip to the Canal Zone preceded cold weather operations with SubRon 8 at NS Argentia, Newfoundland during November, after which she returned to New London. Decommissioned and placed in service 26 September 1947, she provided vital service to the submarine base at New London until January 1959. On the 15th she entered Charleston Naval Shipyard for conversion to a tender for the Polaris Fleet Ballistic Missile submarines, including the addition of a 44-foot section amidships.

=== 1960–1992 ===
Proteus recommissioned 8 July 1960, and after shakedown at Guantanamo Bay, she accomplished her first SSBN refit 20 January–21 February at New London. She then crossed the Atlantic - the anti-war Committee of 100 staged its first major action in London to coincide with her expected arrival in Scottish waters on 18 February 1961, whilst she arrived in Holy Loch, Scotland on 3 March that year. She remained in the Loch for the next two years, completing 38 refits of Fleet Ballistic Missile submarines. She received the Navy Unit Commendation for her accelerated deployment of all SSBNs alongside during the Cuban Missile Crisis. Back at Charleston for overhaul in 1963, on 2 January 1964 she resumed operations at Holy Loch to provide support and refits to the Fleet Ballistic Missile submarines of Submarine Squadron 14.

On 24 February Proteus arrived at Rota, Spain, to establish the second overseas replenishment site for Fleet Ballistic Missile submarines. On 29 June she put in at Charleston and on 16 October was en route to Guam. Arriving Apra Harbor 29 November, she established the third overseas replenishment site for the Fleet Ballistic Missile submarines. She continued to operate at Apra Harbor and in the Pacific for the next seven years, taking a five-month time off for self-overhaul in 1968 – relieved by Hunley (AS-31).

In 1971, after a brief R&R visit to Pearl Harbor, Proteus proceeded to Mare Island for an extensive overhaul, including a significant propulsion upgrade. A boiler accident forced her to stay at Ford Island, Hawaii for two months then a shake-down was accomplished out of Pearl Harbor, and after an R&R port call to Sydney Australia, Proteus returned to Apra Harbor for the now routine exchange with Hunley.

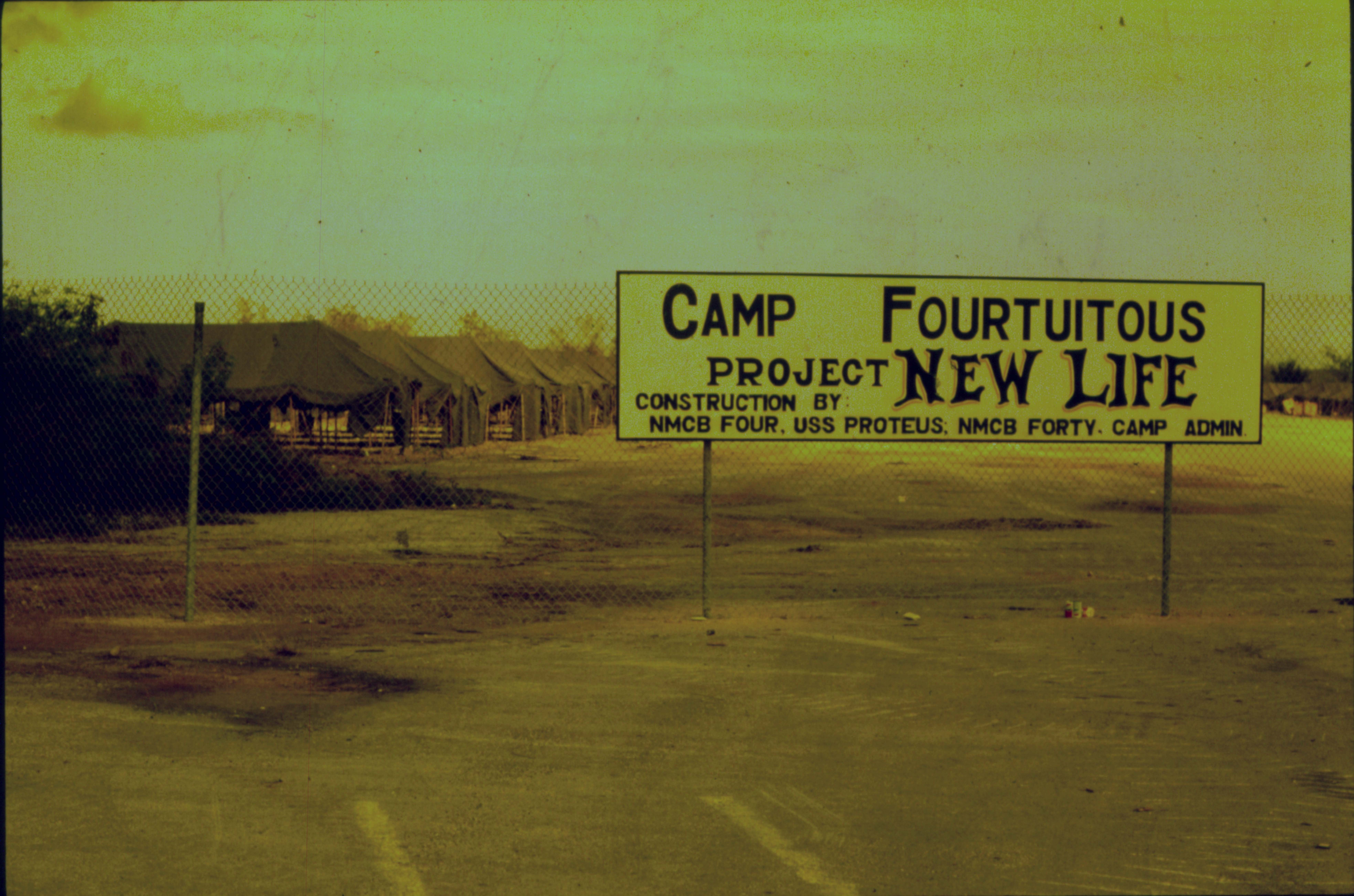
Operation New Life camp sign crediting Proteus, 1975

The exchange was completed by mid-January, 1973, and Proteus resumed her duties. In 1974 personnel from the Ship Repair Facility at Naval Base Guam removed the remaining 5-inch gun turret and munitions as unnecessary for her primary mission – leaving only the four 20mm mounts as her main defensive weapons. When Saigon fell in 1975, some 100,000 Vietnamese fled their country and were processed by the U.S. on Guam. In a massive undertaking called Operation New Life, every able-bodied individual who could be spared helped provide facilities to care for the refugees. As part of that effort over 1,000 officers and men from Proteus worked with Seabee construction personnel to erect the refugee tent city at Orote Field on Naval Base Guam, leaving only a hand-picked skeleton crew of individuals aboard to see to her safety and security; as well as handle emergencies from the boats that were in. But for that week, Proteus was out of business as usual – for which the Secretary of the Navy awarded Proteus her second Meritorious Unit Commendation in 1975; and she (along with other participating Navy Units) were awarded the first award of the Navy Humanitarian Service Medal (established by Executive Order January 1977 for actions beginning 1 April 1975).

In 1976 Proteus received her third consecutive Engineering "E" and second Humanitarian Medal for Typhoon Pamela disaster relief; and the Battle Efficiency "E" in 1978. That year, Proteus was sent to overhaul at Long Beach Naval Shipyard rather than the expected retirement and decommissioning.

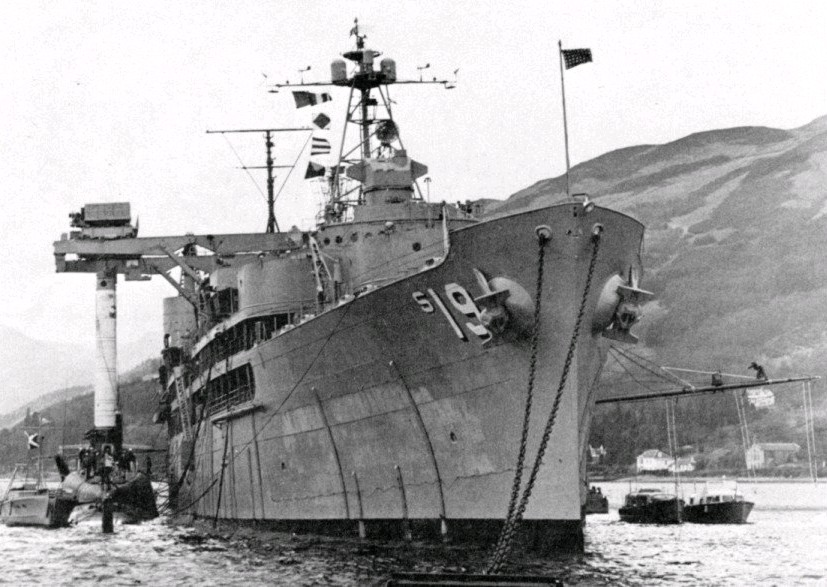
Transfer of a Polaris missile between Proteus and USS Patrick Henry at Holy Loch, Scotland, in 1961.

In 1980, her overhaul ended, Proteus returned to Guam via a port call in Mazatlán, Mexico. Once again, she relieved the USS Hunley and resumed duties as the Guam home-ported submarine tender. The ensuing year saw Proteus conduct the last Pacific SSBN refits under the aegis of Submarine Squadron 15. Following, the standing down of Submarine Squadron 15 on 30 September 1981, Proteus was placed under the command of Submarine Group 7 with additional duty as Submarine Group 7 Rep Guam. The missile magazine was deactivated, various modifications were made to the ship, and the Marine Detachment departed. On 21 October 1981, the Proteus was awarded the Battle "E" Efficiency. In November 1981, Proteus departed Guam on a six-month deployment to Diego Garcia in the Indian Ocean. 22 December 1981, Proteus crossed the equator and received Neptunis Rex and Davy Jones aboard for Shellback ceremonies. Although a submarine tender, while at Diego Garcia, Proteus worked on any ship needing assistance. In March 1982, still in Diego Garcia, Proteus provided repair assistance to HMS Sheffield who tied up to Proteus's port side. After leaving Diego Garcia, the Sheffield sailed to the Falkland Islands where she sank on 10 May 1982 after an Argentine air attack on 4 May 1982. Proteus returned to Guam in May 1982, after port calls in Fremantle, Australia and Subic Bay, RP and with a second crossing of the Equator. In the fall of 1983, Proteus once again visited Subic Bay, RP, along with a November stop in Hong Kong prior to returning to Guam on 9 December 1983. Another Indian Ocean deployment to Diego Garcia followed from May to September 1984 with stops in Singapore and both Perth and Darwin, Australia as well as a third crossing of the Equator.

During 1987-1989 Proteus continued Fast Attack and SSBN support while homeported in Guam and deployed to Subic Naval Base, Philippines, Chinhae, S. Korea, and Japan. Proteus during these years enjoyed liberty ports in Hong Kong and Pattaya, Thailand.

Proteus was decommissioned again in September 1992 and soon thereafter struck from the Naval Register.

=== 1994–2007 ===
1994 Proteus was re-commissioned yet again as a Berthing Auxiliary and placed in service at Puget Sound Naval Shipyard, Bremerton, Washington. At this time Proteus took on the new naval designation Miscellaneous Unclassified IX-518.

In September 1999 the ship was placed out of active service and laid up at the National Defense Reserve Fleet at Suisun Bay, California. Late 2007 she was towed to Esco Marine, Brownsville, Texas for scrapping; which was completed in early 2008.

== Awards ==

Navy Unit Commendation	Meritorious Unit Commendation with one star	Navy E Ribbon
Navy Expeditionary Medal	Asiatic–Pacific Campaign Medal	World War II Victory Medal
Navy Occupation Medal with "ASIA" clasp	National Defense Service Medal with one star	Humanitarian Service Medal with one star

== See also ==
- Norwalk Class Cargo Ships
