= USS Hunley =

Tender of the United States Navy

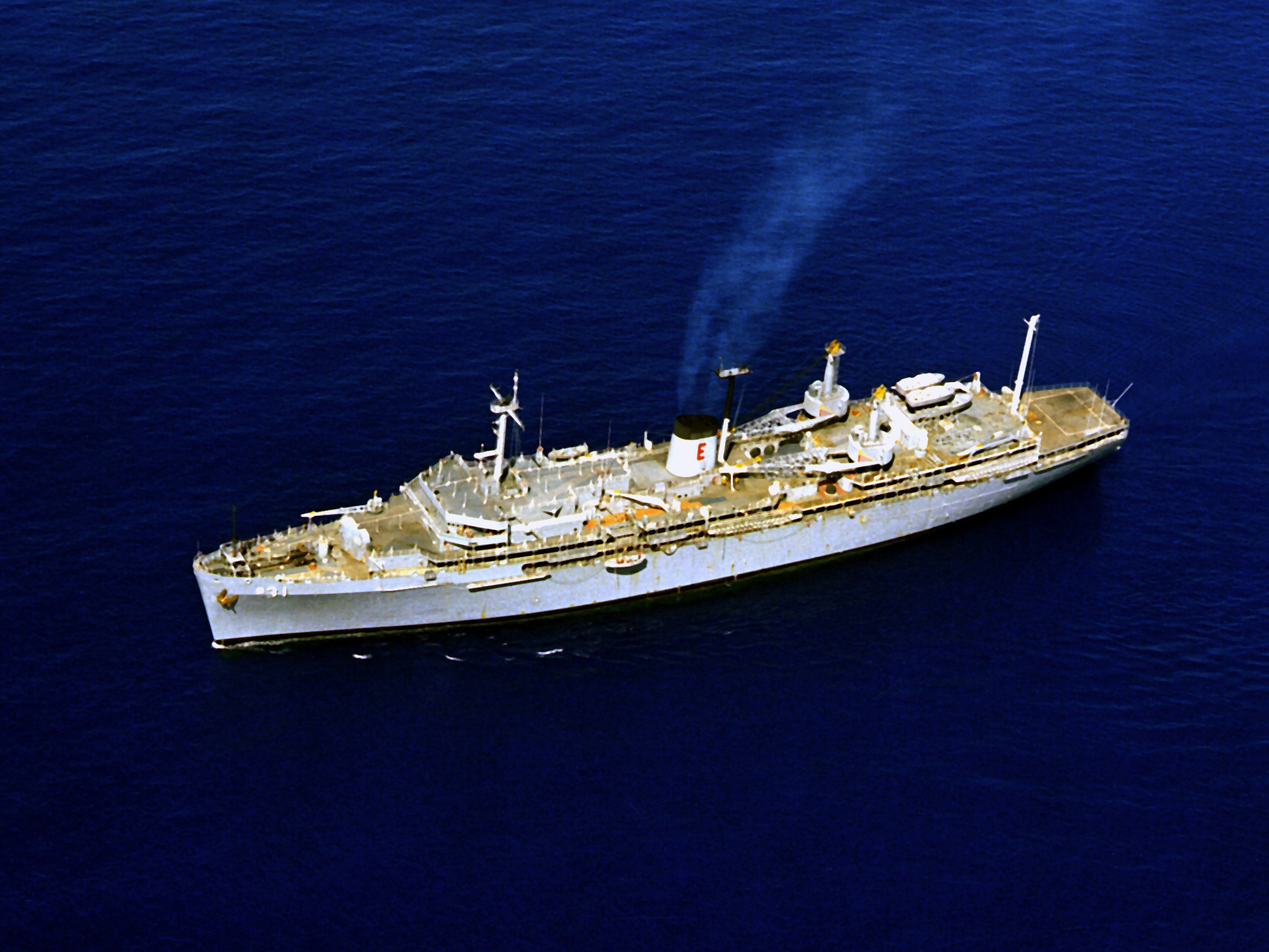
- USS Hunley (AS-31) off Guam in 1980

History

United States
- Name: USS Hunley (AS-31)
- Namesake: Horace Lawson Hunley
- Awarded: 16 November 1959
- Builder: Newport News Shipbuilding & Dry Dock Company
- Laid down: 28 November 1960
- Launched: 28 September 1961
- Commissioned: 16 June 1962
- Decommissioned: 30 September 1994
- Stricken: 3 May 1995
- Motto: We Serve to Preserve Peace
- Fate: Sold for scrap, 5 January, 2007

General characteristics
- Class & type: Hunley-class submarine tender
- Displacement: 19,000 tons
- Length: 599 ft (183 m)
- Beam: 83 ft (25 m)
- Draft: 23 ft 4 in (7.11 m)
- Propulsion: Diesel–electric
- Speed: 18 kn (33 km/h)
- Complement: 1,190
- Armament: 2 x 5"

USS Hunley (AS-31) was a submarine tender of the United States Navy launched on 28 September 1961 and commissioned 16 June 1962. The Hunley was designed to tend most of the long-term requirements of the Polaris Class of submarines. The ship achieved several records and milestones in its service. The Hunley was decommissioned from the regular navy, in 1995 transferred to the US Maritime Commission, and in 2007 sold as scrap to a metal recycling company in Louisiana. In September 2008, during Hurricane Gustav, the decommissioned ship broke free of its moorings in the New Orleans Inner Harbor, but caused little or no damage while adrift.

== Design and construction ==
Hunley had the distinction of being the first ship designed and built from the keel up to service and maintain the U.S. Navy's nuclear-powered Ballistic Missile Submarine Fleet. She had complete facilities for servicing the complex Polaris Weapons Systems and for accomplishing any submarine repair other than a major shipyard overhaul. The hull was laid down in by the Newport News Shipbuilding & Dry Dock Company, Newport News, Virginia and sponsored by Mrs. J. Palmer Gaillard, wife of the Mayor of Charleston, South Carolina. The ship was named in honor of Horace Lawson Hunley, the designer of the first submarine to sink an enemy vessel in naval history, the Confederate submarine H. L. Hunley.

== Career ==
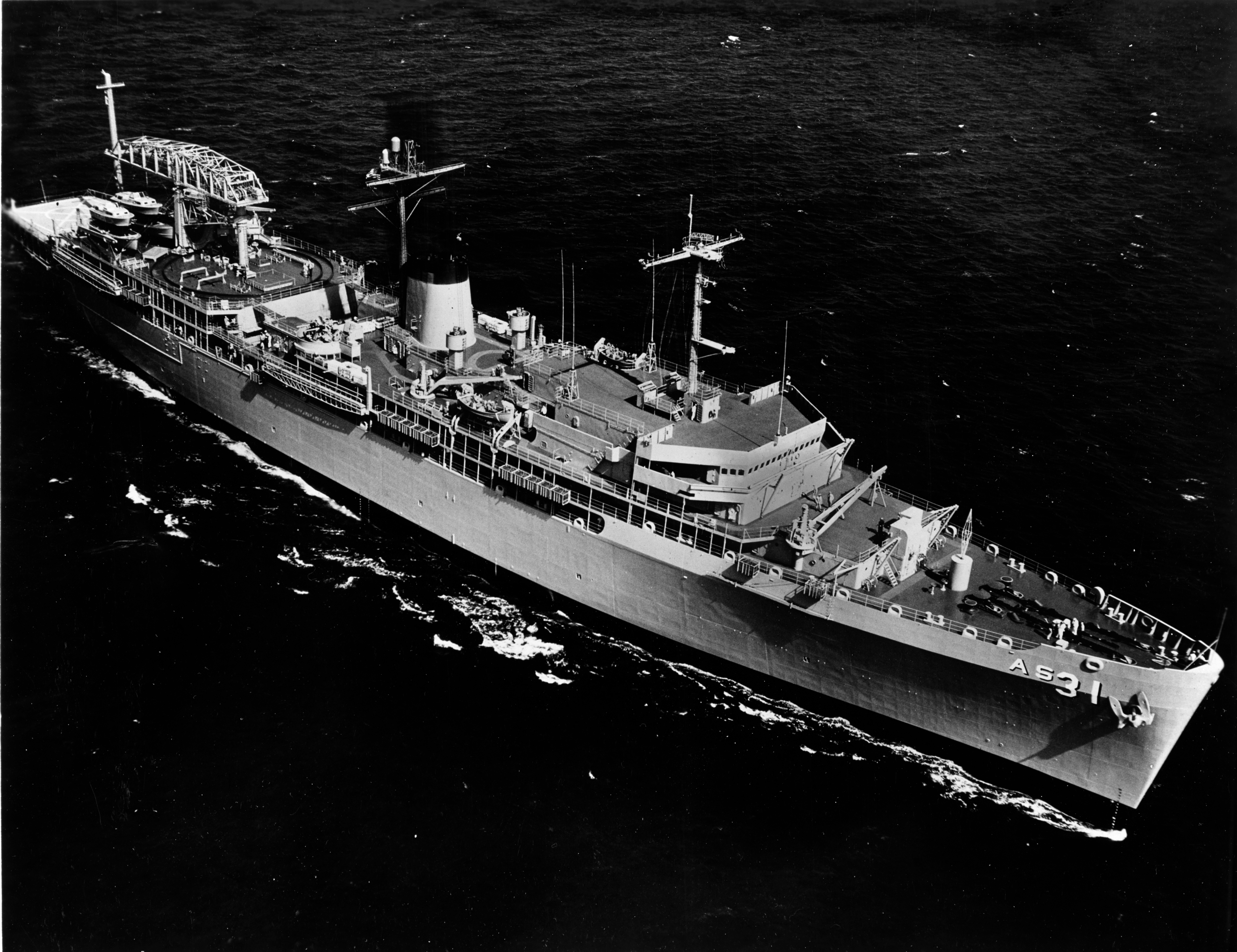
Hunley in 1962.

With Captain Douglas N. Syverson in command, Hunley sailed 25 July 1962 for shakedown training off Cuba until 6 September 1962. She visited several Gulf and Atlantic ports and returned to Norfolk 28 September for post-shakedown alterations until 8 December 1962. After which the Hunley paid a 3-day visit to New York City to host the Naval Reserve Officers Seminar "New Ships for the Modern Navy". She departed from the Norfolk Operating Base 29 December 1962 for Holy Loch, Scotland, arriving 9 January 1963. Almost immediately she began taking the load off USS Proteus, whom she officially relieved 15 March 1963 as tender to Submarine Squadron 14 at Holy Loch. This duty continued until 12 April 1964 when Hunley sailed for conversion that provided capability of handling the new A3 Polaris Missile. She resumed her duties at Holy Loch on 15 June 1964.

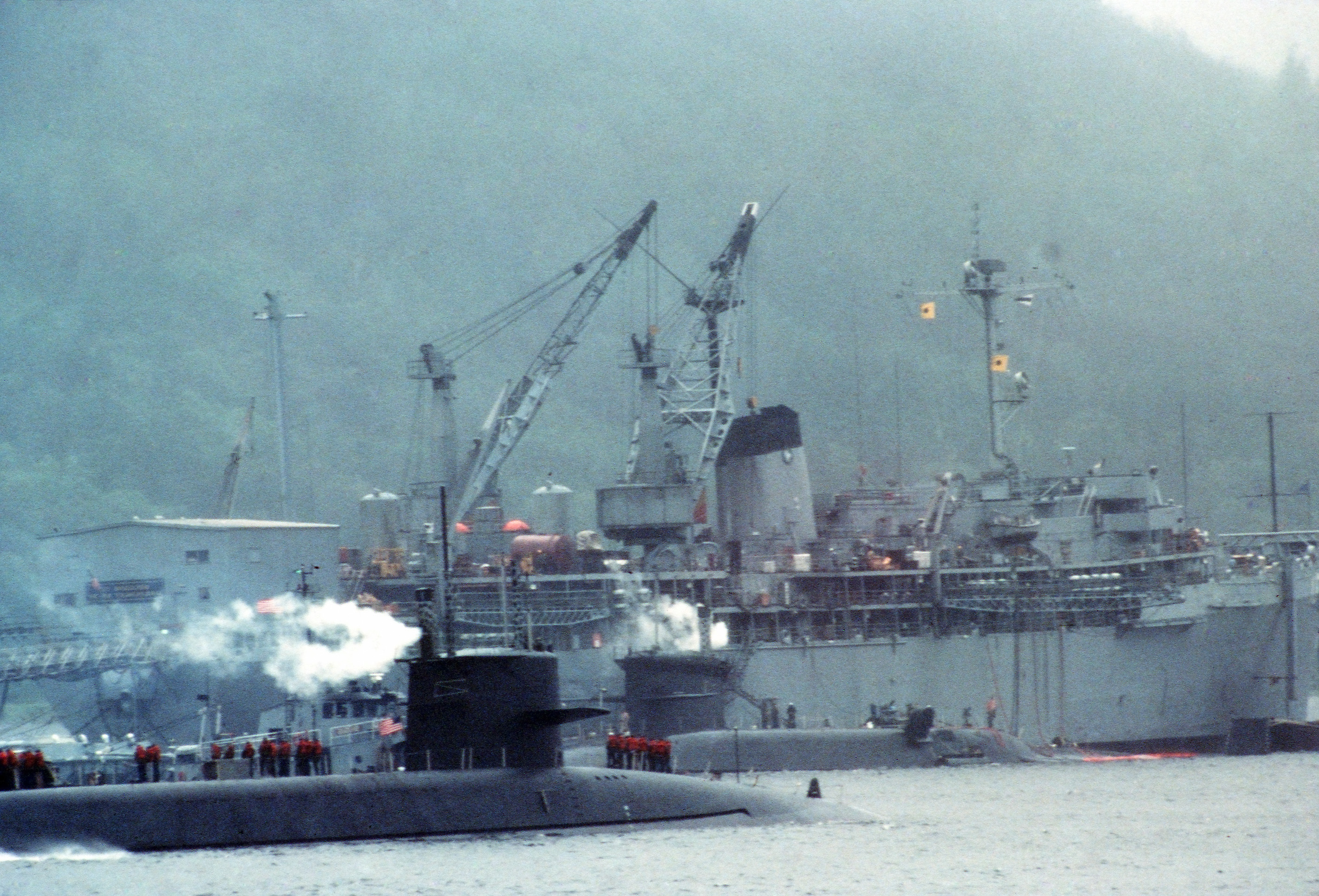
Hunley servicing SSBNs at Holy Loch, Scotland (UK), 1981.

A Polaris milestone was reached in December 1965 when USS Thomas A. Edison came alongside to commence the 100th refit of a nuclear ballistic submarine (SSBN) by the Hunley. This signified that one hundred SSBN submarines had gone out on time from Hunley and not one of them had to make an early return from patrol. This represented some 200 months of Polaris on station or 16 1/2 years of submerged strategic deterrent since Hunley's arrival in Holy Loch 9 January 1963. Hunley's motto was "We Serve to Preserve Peace". Hunley returned to the United States late in 1966 and in 1967 operated out of Charleston, South Carolina. Hunley put out for Guam on the day after Christmas, 1967, to relieve Proteus at Polaris Point from January to June 1968 while Proteus underwent a self-overhaul, with Hunley returning to Charleston in July 1968. In 1971 Hunley relieved Proteus in Guam again in order for Proteus to go to shipyard. It was while Hunley was in Guam that the Machinery Repair Division received the Meritorious Unit Commendation, having expended 4500 hours of repair labor on various units of the U.S. Pacific Fleet. In 1973 Hunley returned to Bremerton Shipyard for conversion overhaul. After completion Hunley returned to Charleston, South Carolina, to again service the Atlantic Fleet. In 1978, Hunley went to Boston Naval Shipyard for hull cleaning and hull valve repairs in preparation for relieving Proteus once again in Guam. In transit to Guam, Hunley went around South America rather than through the Panama Canal. In 1980, Hunley was relieved by Proteus and returned to Charleston via the Panama Canal.

Hunley was decommissioned on 30 September 1994 and struck from the Naval Vessel Register on 3 May 1995 and turned over to the Maritime Commission on 1 May 1999. Hunley was subsequently sold to the Southern Scrap Materials Company on 5 January 2007 for scrapping.

== Advanced capabilities ==
Among jobs carried out by Hunley was welding on SSBN pressure hulls or reactor plant fluid systems. Once unheard of in submarine tending, these jobs were only a few of many carried out by Hunley's crew. These and many other alterations were carried out as a matter of routine to keep SSBN's on the line with the newest possible technical improvements and safety devices. For example, an auxiliary "Sub-Safe" package was accomplished on the USS Theodore Roosevelt in which over 40 fittings and more than 100 feet of new piping in a major system were installed. A battery replacement for the USS Ethan Allen was completed in only 11 days. Hunley met demands from making water-borne propeller replacements to encapsulation of AC induction motors; delicate repairs to navigation and fire control, and many other varied tasks to ensure that each SSBN had the finest of care on each refit. In 1976 from June through September an Extended Refit was performed on an SSBN assigned to Hunley and a tiger team made up from the Hunley the SSBN and the Charleston shipyard completed an in drydock overhaul of many systems as well as hull and propeller. The Hunley team leaders were Lt. Charles (Chuck) Emery, Engine Chief Petty Officer G.A. Page and a second class Petty Officer George Campbell. After the ERP and the paperwork was completed the SSBN returned to her duties in the Atlantic.

== Stowaway incident ==
After a 1973 port call in Sydney, en route to Pearl Harbor, two teenage girls from New Zealand were found hiding out in one of the Hunley's missile crane control cabs, when a sailor was spotted carrying food up the ladder to the crane. Hunley was diverted to Brisbane to offload the stowaways, and the "helpful" sailors were disciplined.
