= Holy Loch =

Sea loch in Argyll and Bute, Scotland

- An Loch Sianta/Seunta (Scottish Gaelic)
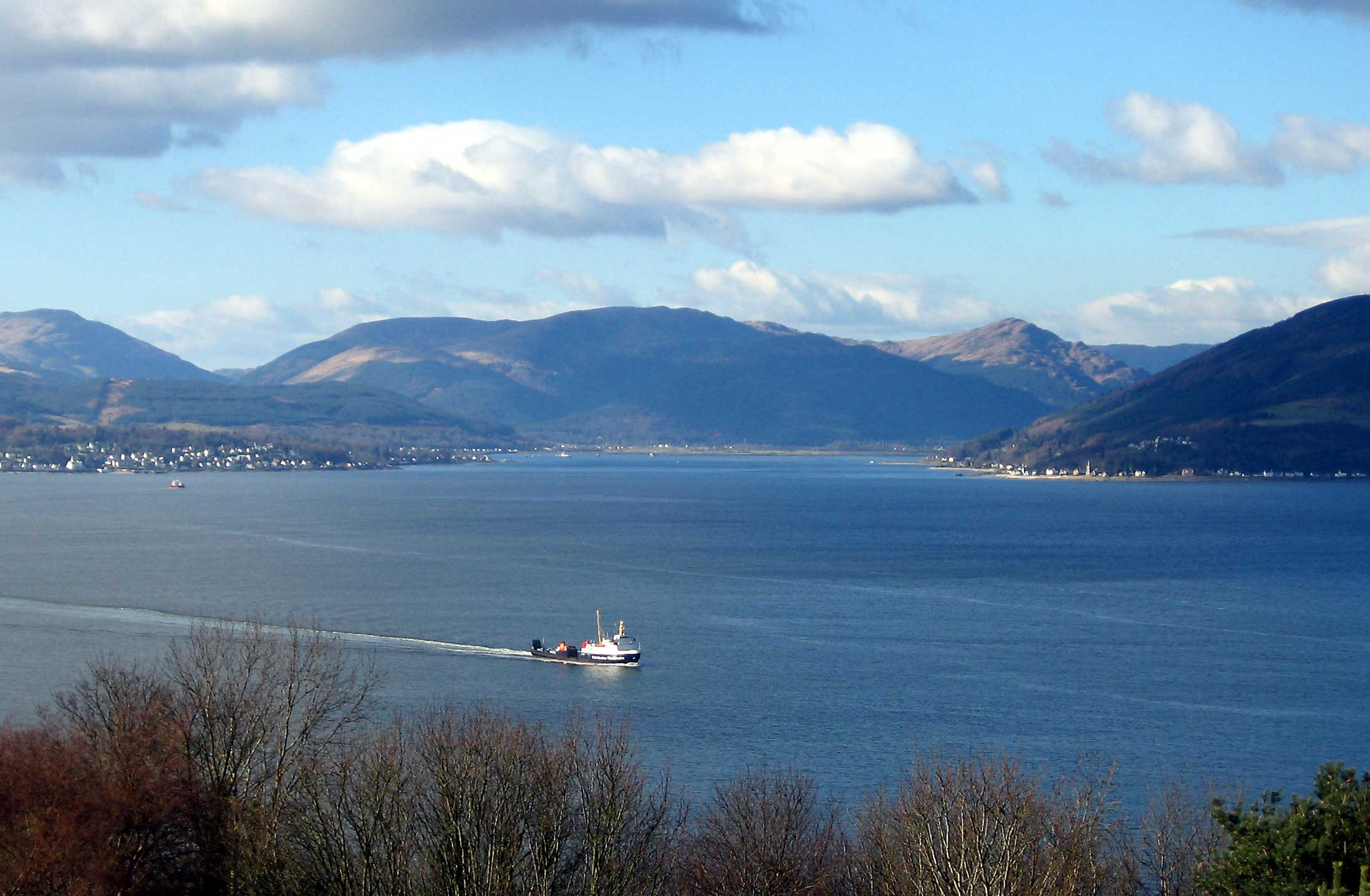
- The Holy Loch seen across the Firth of Clyde from Tower Hill, Gourock, with Hunters Quay on the left and Strone to the right

- Location within Argyll and Bute
- Location: Cowal Peninsula, Argyll and Bute, Scotland
- Coordinates: 55.987°N 4.933°W; National grid reference NS1713980778
- Type: Sea loch
- Basin countries: Scotland, United Kingdom
- Surface elevation: Sea level
- Frozen: No
- Islands: 0

The Holy Loch (Scottish Gaelic: An Loch Sianta/Seunta) is a sea loch, part of the Firth of Clyde, in Argyll and Bute, Scotland.

The "Holy Loch" name is believed to date from the 6th century, when Saint Munn landed there after leaving Ireland. Kilmun Parish Church and Argyll Mausoleum is said to stand where Saint Munn's church was once located.

Robertson's Yard at Sandbank, a village on the loch, was a major wooden boat building company in the late 19th and early 20th centuries.

During World War II, the loch was used as a British Royal Navy submarine base. From 1961 to 1992, it was used as a United States Navy ballistic missile submarine base. In 1992, the Holy Loch base was deemed unnecessary following the demise of the Soviet Union and subsequently closed.

== Geography ==
Open on the Firth of Clyde at its eastern end, the loch is approximately 1 mile (1.6 km) wide and between 2 and 3 miles (3 and 5 km) long, varying with the tide. Dunoon on the Cowal peninsula lies on the shores of the Clyde just to the south of the loch, and houses continue round the villages of Kirn, Hunters Quay, Ardnadam and past Lazaretto Point, the village of Sandbank, with open countryside at the end of the loch, then on the northern shore Kilmun, and at Strone Point the village of Strone continues on the western shore of the Firth of Clyde, almost joining Blairmore on Loch Long.

All the villages used to have piers served by Clyde steamers, and now Western Ferries runs between Hunters Quay and McInroy's Point on the outskirts of Gourock, while the Argyll Ferries service runs from Dunoon to Gourock pierhead. At the end of the loch, the A815 (after being joined by the A880 at Ardbeg) leads north, to the east of the River Eachaig, to the Benmore Botanic Garden and Arboretum (also known as the Younger Botanic Gardens), Loch Eck and on towards Inveraray.

== History ==
=== Medieval period ===
On the shore of the Holy Loch at Kilmun (Gaelic Cill Mhunnu, 'the church of St Munnu') stands a nineteenth-century church. It stands on the site of a sequence of earlier churches, and an early carved stone on the site suggests that there was a church here perhaps as early as the sixth or seventh century. The dedication to St Munnu, otherwise known as Fintan, St Munn (Fintán of Taghmon), reflects devotion to an Irish saint who founded a church at Taghmon in Leinster. The remains of a 12th-century church are still visible at Kilmun. At the present site of Kilmun Church, a church building is recorded in the 13th century. By the 15th century, the significance of Kilmun as a local centre of Christianity was so great that the adjacent loch became known as the Holy Loch, and the powerful Clan Campbell adopted it as their spiritual home. From the 14th century, Dunoon Castle, a short distance away, was held by the Campbell family and in the 1440s Sir Duncan Campbell of Lochawe (later 1st Lord Campbell), the then chief of the clan, lived near Kilmun in a private residence named Strathechaig.

=== Modern history ===
==== Robertson's Yard ====
Alexander Robertson started repairing boats in a small workshop at Sandbank in 1876, and Alexander Robertson & Sons went on to become one of the foremost wooden boat builders on the Clyde. Their 'golden years' were in the early 20th century when they started building classic 12 & 15 metre racing yachts. Robertsons was chosen to build the first 15-metre yacht designed by William Fife (Shimna, 1907). More than 55 boats were built by Robertsons in preparation for the First World War and the yard remained busy even during the Great Depression in the 1930s, as many wealthy businessmen developed a passion for yacht racing. During World War II the yard was devoted to Admiralty work, producing a wide range of large high speed Fairmile Marine Motor Boats (MTBs and MGBs).

After the war the yard built the successful one-class Loch Longs and two 12-metre challengers for the America's Cup: Sceptre (1958) (17 tonnes) and Sovereign (1964). The Robertson family sold the yard in 1965, and it was turned over to GRP production work (mainly Pipers and Etchells). During its 104-year history, Robertson's Yard built 500 boats, many of which are still sailing. The yard ceased trading in the early 1980s; at this point it was owned by Terry Hooper who ran the yard servicing mostly the US Navy. After the US navy packed up and left the area Hooper sold the yard in the 1990s. The site has since been converted to residential building and the new Holy Loch Marina development. The yard today is still widely known in the area as 'Hooper's Yard'.

==== World War II ====
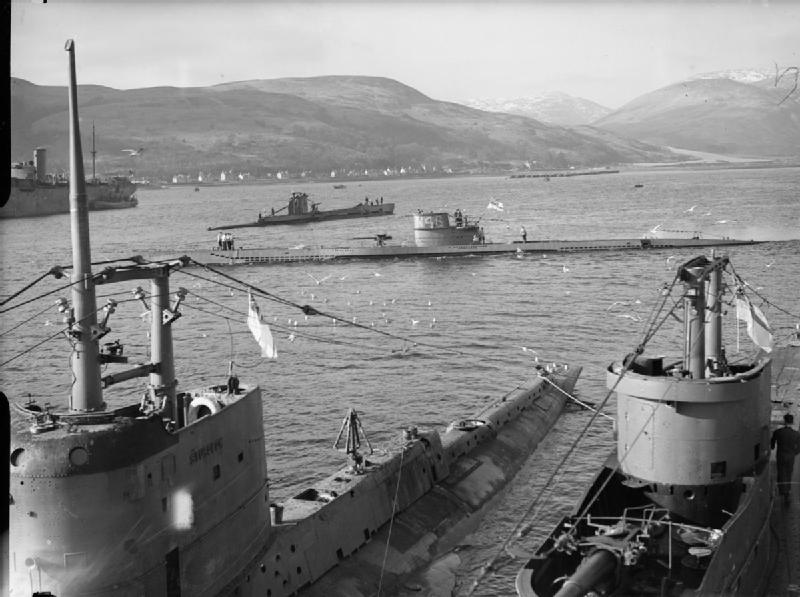
HMS Graph, HMS Sturgeon, HMS Tigris, P 42 at Holy Loch WWII

During World War II the loch was used by the Royal Navy as a submarine base, served by the depot ship HMS Forth. The loch was used extensively for trials and exercises by Royal Navy submarines during the war, the submarines HMS Vandal (P64) and HMS Untamed (P58) were lost in the Clyde after being sunk by accidents during exercises. Untamed was later salvaged.

Near the Holy Loch an anti-submarine boom was constructed between Dunoon and the Cloch Point Lighthouse to defend waters from German U-boats.

==== US Navy at Holy Loch ====
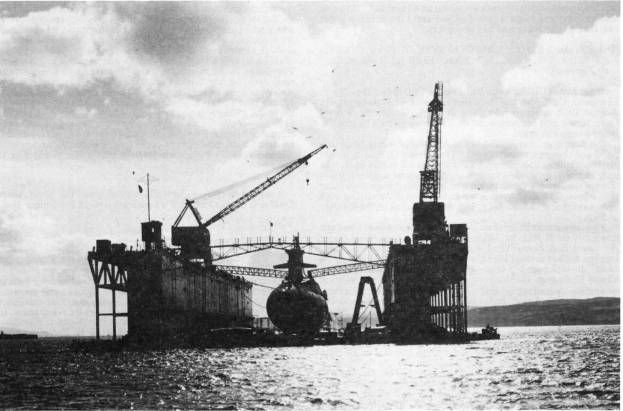
USS Abraham Lincoln (SSBN-602) in the floating drydock USS Los Alamos (AFDB-7)

Between 1961 and 1992, Holy Loch was the site of the United States Navy's Fleet Ballistic Missile (FBM) Refit Site One. It was the home base of Submarine Squadron (SUBRON) 14, part of Submarine Force, US Atlantic Fleet. To make maximum use of its submarine-launched ballistic missile (SLBM) force, the American military had determined that it required an overseas base for refit and crew turnover. Negotiations with the British government began in March 1959 when US President Dwight D. Eisenhower mentioned the need to British prime minister Harold Macmillan at a meeting at Camp David.

Holy Loch was one of several locations on or near the Firth of Clyde considered for the refit site. Others were Faslane, the channel between Largs and Cumbrae, Rosneath Bay, and Rothesay Bay. Site selection criteria included the requirements for a sheltered anchorage, relative proximity to an international airport, and sufficient shore facilities to provide housing for military personnel and their families. Agreement for the use of Holy Loch was reached near the end of 1960 and the arrival of the first tender, USS Proteus (AS-19) scheduled for December. Divisions within the British government and concerns about protests by the Campaign for Nuclear Disarmament (CND) caused her arrival to be rescheduled to 3 March 1961. Protests at the site followed.

Between 1961 and 1982, the Naval Support Activity ashore was administered by US Naval Activities London. In 1982, Naval Support Activity (NAVSUPPACT), Forward Base, Holy Loch, Scotland became its own command. NAVSUPPACT ultimately managed 42 facilities and leased 342 housing units for Navy personnel and their dependents.

Holy Loch's most prosperous period occurred with the naval base and its 3,000 Americans. A monument was built to the US Navy years in the Castle Gardens, Dunoon.

Over the years, five different submarine tenders and one floating dry dock served in the loch.

Submarine tenders
Arrived	Departed	Tender	Notes
March 1961	January 1963	USS Proteus (AS-19)	Commenced first site one refit 6 March 1961. (USS Patrick Henry (SSBN-599))
January 1963	August 1966	USS Hunley (AS-31)	
August 1966	May 1970	USS Simon Lake (AS-33)	
May 1970	November 1975	USS Canopus (AS-34)	
November 1975	January 1982	USS Holland (AS-32)	
January 1982	June 1987	USS Hunley (AS-31)	
June 1987	March 1992	USS Simon Lake (AS-33)	

Floating dry dock
Arrived	Departed	Drydock	Notes
June 1961	February 1992	Los Alamos (AFDB-7)	February 1964, completed the first "off centre" docking of a Polaris submarine

Two notable incidents occurred during the three-decade long deployment of SUBRON 14 at Holy Loch. On 29 November 1970, a fire erupted on USS Canopus, killing three of her complement. Almost four years later, on 3 November 1974, the nuclear ballistic missile submarine USS James Madison (SSBN-627) collided with a Soviet submarine, assumed to be a Victor-class nuclear-powered attack submarine, during a dive just after departing from Holy Loch. The American submarine was dented and suffered a nine-foot scratch on her hull. She spent a week at the base for inspection and repairs.

Laurel Clark, known to her shipmates as "Doc Salton", was assigned as the Radiation Health Officer and Undersea Medical Officer at SUBRON 14. Clark was one of the astronauts killed in the Space Shuttle Columbia disaster on 1 February 2003.

New technologies and the end of the Cold War led to the base being deemed unnecessary. The last submarine tender to be based there, the USS Simon Lake (AS-33), left Holy Loch in November 1991, ahead of the base closing the following June. The closing of the base caused significant economic decline.
