= Levering Smith =

United States Navy admiral (1910–1993)

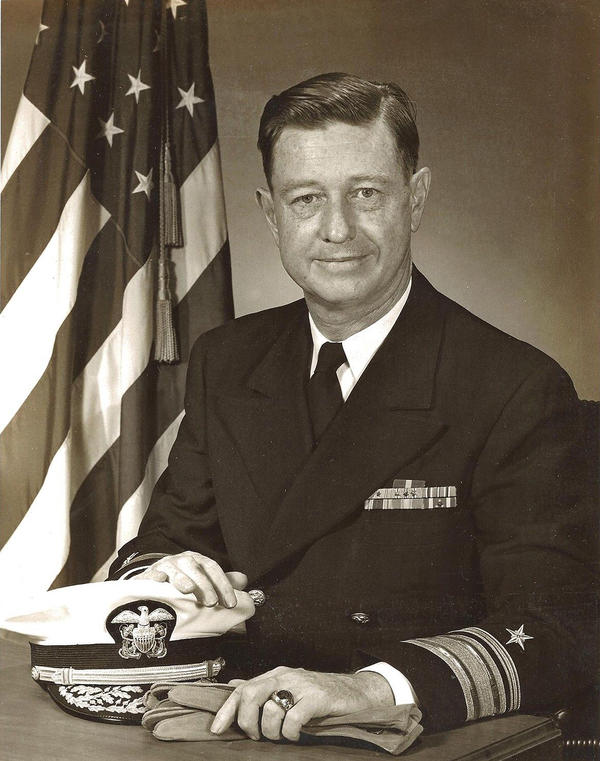
- Photo circa 1960
- Born: 5 March 1910; Joplin, Missouri
- Died: 5 April 1993 (aged 83); San Diego, California
- Burial place: San Marcos District Cemetery, San Marcos, California
- Military career
- Allegiance: United States
- Branch: United States Navy
- Service years: 1932–1974
- Rank: Vice Admiral
- Nickname: Rosie
- Commands: United States Navy Special Projects Office
- Conflicts: World War II: Battle of the Santa Cruz Islands; Battle of Tassafaronga; Battle of the Philippine Sea
- Awards: Distinguished Service Medal (3); Knight Commander of the Order of the British Empire (UK)

Vice Admiral Levering Smith (5 March 1910 – 5 April 1993) was a United States Navy admiral. He is best known for his role in the development of the Polaris, Poseidon and Trident missiles for ballistic missile submarines.

== Biography ==
Levering Smith was born in Joplin, Missouri, on 5 March 1910 to Aaron Levering and Ethel (McClellan) Smith. He entered the United States Naval Academy at Annapolis, Maryland, from which he graduated with the class of 1932. He served on the battleship USS Texas from 1932 to 1936, and the destroyer USS Shaw from 1936 to 1938, before returning to Annapolis as an instructor. He then attended the Naval Postgraduate School from 1939 to 1940.

During World War II, Smith was posted to the aircraft carrier USS Hornet, serving on it until it was sunk in the Battle of the Santa Cruz Islands in October 1942. He then served on the cruiser USS Northampton until it, too, was sunk in the Battle of Tassafaronga the following month. He later participated in the Battle of the Philippine Sea on the fleet flagship USS Indianapolis.

After the war, Smith was posted to the Naval Ordnance Test Station at China Lake, California, where he worked with rockets as the head of first the Explosives Department and then as associate technical director. He came to the conclusion that solid-propellant rockets were the best solution for shipboard and submarine use. In 1954, he became the head of the Explosive Department at the Naval Ordnance Missile Test Facility at White Sands, New Mexico, concurrently serving as the Navy deputy to the Army general in command of the White Sands Missile Range.

In 1955, the Navy became involved in a joint intermediate-range ballistic missile (IRBM) project with the Army to develop the Jupiter missile. Dissatisfied with liquid-propellant rockets, the Navy pulled out of the project. The head of the Special Projects Office, Rear Admiral William F. Raborn, Jr., brought in Smith to help develop a solid-fuel missile, which became the Polaris missile. The improvement in safety could be compared to a family taking a bag of charcoal on vacation instead of a can of gasoline.

He went on to work on the Poseidon and Trident missiles, serving as director of the Special Projects Office from 1966 until his retirement in 1974. Rear Admiral Robert Wertheim recalled that

Throughout the development of the Polaris family of weapons, the transition to the more potent Poseidon and the conceptual exploration that led to the present Trident system, Levering Smith led either the technical team or the entire program. Thus, he contributed over twenty years of intelligent leadership, utilizing the combined assets of the country from our universities, government labs, and industry.

In addition to his work on the US Navy's ballistic missile projects, he provided crucial support to the UK Polaris missile program. According to The Daily Telegraph, "... it was no small measure due to him [Levering Smith] that the British Polaris programme was completed on time and on budget — an unprecedented feat in British naval history." For this, he was made an honorary Knight Commander of the Most Excellent Order of the British Empire on 7 January 1972.

Smith died of cancer at Scripps Mercy Hospital in San Diego, California, on 5 April 1993, and was buried in San Marcos District Cemetery in San Marcos, California. He was survived by his wife, Beulah Weymouth Lewis Smith (1913–2007). Since 1986, he had been honored by the Vice Admiral Levering Smith Award for Submarine Support Achievement. Presented by the Naval Submarine League, it "recognizes specific or continuing submarine support actions which have most contributed to the furtherance of the spirit or fighting mettle of the Submarine Force."

His awards included three awards of the Navy Distinguished Service Medal, the American Defense Service Medal with one star, and the Asiatic–Pacific Campaign Medal with eleven stars. His received the L.T.E. Thompson Award from the Naval Ordnance Test Station and the C. N. Hickman from the American Rocket Society in 1957; the American Society of Naval Engineers' Gold Medal and the Rear Admiral William S. Parsons Award from Navy League of the United States in 1961; the Gold Knight of Management Award from the National Management Association in 1972; and an honorary doctor of laws degree from New Mexico State University. In 1965, he was elected to the National Academy of Engineering.
