= Office of Special Projects =

The Office of Special Projects may refer to:

- Office of Special Projects, the original name for the Central Intelligence Agency's Office of Policy Coordination
- Office of Special Projects, an elite division of the Naval Criminal Investigative Service that specializes in undercover assignments in the television series NCIS: Los Angeles
- Former United States Navy Special Projects Office
