= George Washington-class submarine =

United States Navy class of fleet ballistic missile submarines

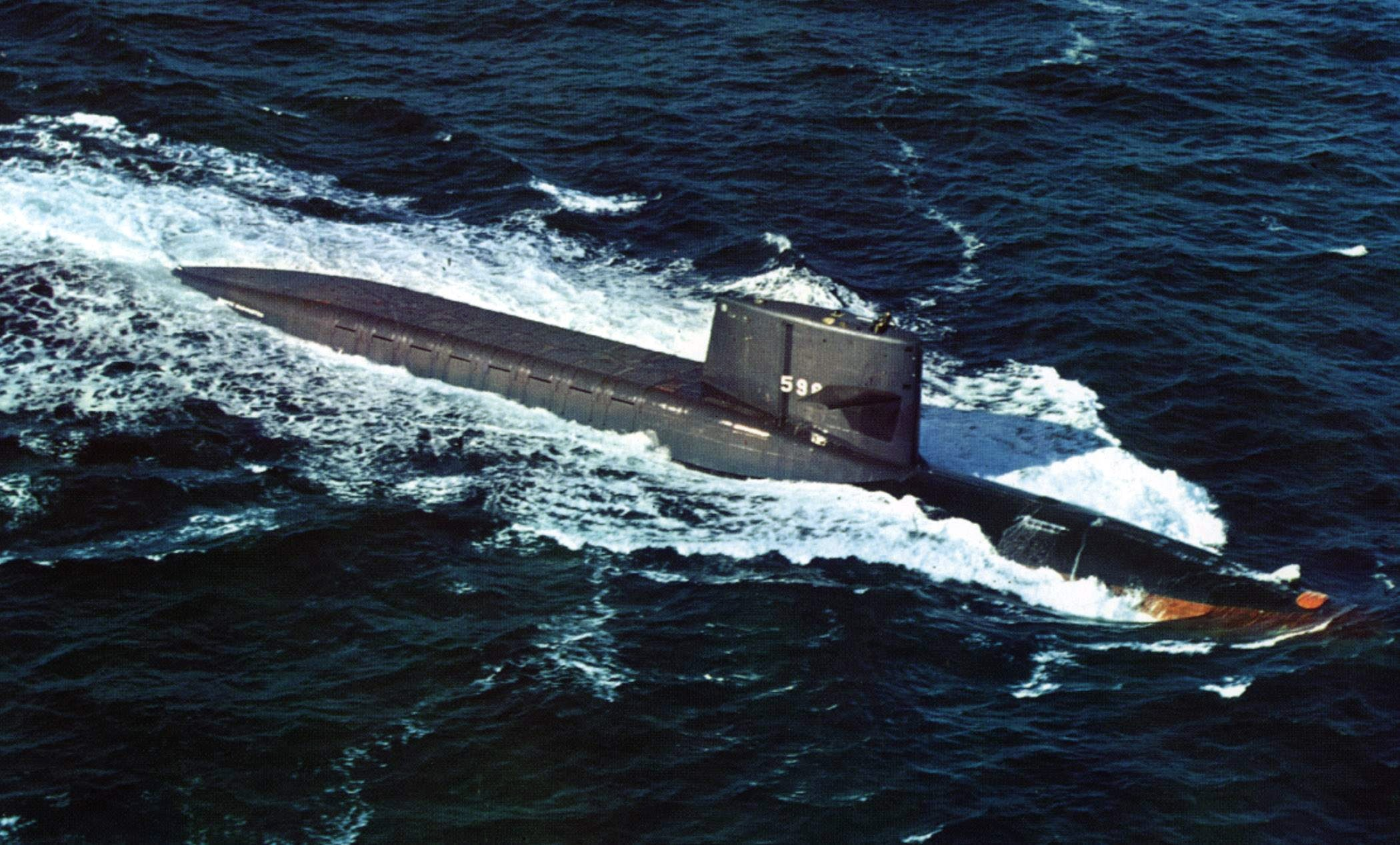
- George Washington at sea

Class overview
- Name: George Washington class
- Operators: United States Navy
- Succeeded by: Ethan Allen class
- Built: 1958–1961
- In commission: 1959–1985
- Completed: 5
- Retired: 5

General characteristics
- Type: Nuclear-powered ballistic missile submarine
- Displacement: Surfaced: 5,959 long tons (6,055 t) Submerged: 6,709 long tons (6,817 t)
- Length: 381.6 ft (116.3 m)
- Beam: 33 ft (10 m)
- Draft: 29 ft (8.8 m)
- Propulsion: 1 S5W PWR; 2 geared steam turbines (15,000 shp (11,000 kW)), 1 shaft
- Speed: 16 knots (30 km/h) surfaced; 22 knots (41 km/h) submerged
- Range: unlimited except by food supplies
- Test depth: 700 ft (210 m)
- Complement: Two crews (Blue/Gold) each consisting of 12 officers and 100 men.
- Armament: 16 Polaris A1/A3 missiles; 6 × 21-inch (533 mm) torpedo tubes, 12 torpedoes

The George Washington class was a class of nuclear-powered ballistic missile submarines deployed by the United States Navy. George Washington, along with the later Ethan Allen, Lafayette, James Madison, and Benjamin Franklin classes, comprised the "41 for Freedom" group of submarines that represented the Navy's main contribution to the nuclear deterrent force through the late 1980s.

== Development ==
In 1957, the US Navy began using submarines in the nuclear deterrent role, when a pair of World War II vintage diesel-electric boats, USS Tunny and USS Barbero, converted to be able to carry a pair of Regulus cruise missiles, began operating deterrent patrols. These two were soon joined by a pair of purpose built diesel boats, and a nuclear powered boat, USS Halibut. However, the use of Regulus in the deterrent role showed a number of limitations; as a cruise missile, it was vulnerable to interception by fighter aircraft, it was limited to subsonic speed, and had a range of less than 1000 km, while the largest of the Regulus armed boats could carry a maximum of only five missiles. Additionally, the submarine had to surface to launch a missile, and the missile was guided by a radio signal transmitted from either ship, aircraft or ground station. (Note: A supersonic successor to Regulus, the Regulus II, was to use inertial instead of radio navigation, but would be cancelled upon the success of Polaris) To overcome these limitations, the Navy turned to ballistic missiles.

The commissioning of George Washington on 30 December 1959, the first submarine Polaris launch on 20 July 1960, and her first deterrent patrol November 1960 – January 1961 were the culmination of four years of intense effort. The Navy initially worked on a sea-based variant of the US Army Jupiter intermediate-range ballistic missile, projecting four of the large, liquid-fueled missiles per submarine. Rear Admiral W. F. "Red" Raborn was appointed by Chief of Naval Operations Admiral Arleigh Burke to head a Special Project Office to develop Jupiter for the Navy, beginning in late 1955. However, at the Project Nobska submarine warfare conference in 1956, physicist Edward Teller stated that a compact one-megaton warhead could be produced for the relatively small, solid-fueled Polaris missile, and this prompted the Navy to leave the Jupiter program in December of that year. Soon Admiral Burke concentrated all Navy strategic research on Polaris, still under Admiral Raborn's Special Project Office. The problems of submerged launch, designing a submarine for 16 missiles, precise navigation for accurate missile targeting, and numerous others were all solved quickly. By comparison, the contemporary Soviet Golf and Hotel-class ballistic missile submarines only carried three missiles each; the Soviets did not commission an SSBN comparable to the George Washington class until 1967 with the introduction of the Yankee-class submarines.

== Construction ==
The Navy ordered a class of nuclear-powered submarines armed with long-range strategic missiles on 31 December 1957, and tasked Electric Boat with converting two existing attack submarine hulls to ballistic missile-carrying boats to quickly create the deterrent force. To accomplish this conversion, Electric Boat persuaded the Navy in January 1958 to slip the launch dates for two Skipjack class fast attack submarines, the just-begun Scorpion (SSN-589) and the not-yet-started Sculpin (SSN-590). On 12 February 1958, President Dwight D. Eisenhower authorized funding for three ballistic missile submarines.

The George Washington class were essentially Skipjack-class submarines with a 130-foot (40 m) missile compartment, inserted between the ship's control/navigation areas and the nuclear reactor compartment. Contrary to some popular accounts, the Skipjacks were not literally "cut in half" to become ballistic missile submarines. Scorpion had only been under construction for two months at Electric Boat in Groton, Connecticut before she was reordered as George Washington (SSBN-598). Material and equipment ordered for Scamp and Sculpin were used to build Patrick Henry (SSBN-599) and Theodore Roosevelt (SSBN-600) at Electric Boat and Mare Island Naval Shipyard, respectively. Newport News Shipbuilding and Portsmouth Naval Shipyard built Robert E. Lee (SSBN-601) and Abraham Lincoln (SSBN-602) without any components ordered for Skipjack-class submarines. The original hull classification of the first three units was SSGN(FBM) (Guided Missile Submarine, Fleet Ballistic Missile) which was changed to SSBN on 26 June 1958.

The George Washington class carried the Polaris A1 missile on their patrols until 2 June 1964, when she changed out her A1 missiles for Polaris A3s. The last member of this class, Abraham Lincoln swapped out her A1s for A3s on 14 October 1965.

== Withdrawal from strategic role ==
By the end of 1979, to make room within the limitations imposed by SALT II for the Ohio-class ballistic missile submarines, and performing shortened patrols of six weeks due to reduced reactor fuel, Theodore Roosevelt and Abraham Lincoln offloaded their missiles at the newly established Explosives Handling Wharf at Bangor, Washington. Eventually their missile compartments were completely removed and they were decommissioned by the end of 1982. For the same reason, by 1983 George Washington, Patrick Henry, and Robert E. Lee had their missiles removed and were reclassified as attack submarines nicknamed, "slow attacks", a role in which they served briefly in Pearl Harbor, Hawaii, prior to being decommissioned by early 1985.

George Washington's sail is preserved at the Submarine Force Library and Museum at Groton, Connecticut.

== Boats in class ==
Submarines of the George Washington class:

Hull number	Name	Builder	Laid down	Launched	Commissioned	Decommissioned	Fate
SSBN-598	George Washington (ex-Scorpion)	General Dynamics Electric Boat, Groton, Connecticut	1 November 1957	9 June 1959	30 December 1959	24 January 1985	Disposed 1998 (Note: Disposed through the Ship-Submarine Recycling Program at Bremerton)
SSBN-599	Patrick Henry	General Dynamics Electric Boat, Groton, Connecticut	27 May 1958	22 September 1959	11 April 1960	25 May 1984	Disposed 1997
SSBN-600	Theodore Roosevelt	Mare Island Naval Shipyard, Vallejo, California	20 May 1958	3 October 1959	13 February 1961	28 February 1981	Disposed 1995
SSBN-601	Robert E. Lee	Newport News Shipbuilding and Drydock Co., Newport News, Virginia	25 August 1958	18 December 1959	15 September 1960	1 December 1983	Disposed 1991
SSBN-602	Abraham Lincoln	Portsmouth Naval Shipyard, Kittery, Maine	1 November 1958	14 May 1960	8 March 1961	28 February 1981	Disposed 1994

== See also ==
- List of submarines of the United States Navy
- List of submarine classes of the United States Navy
