= Robert Wertheim =

American naval officer (1922–2020)

Robert Halley Wertheim
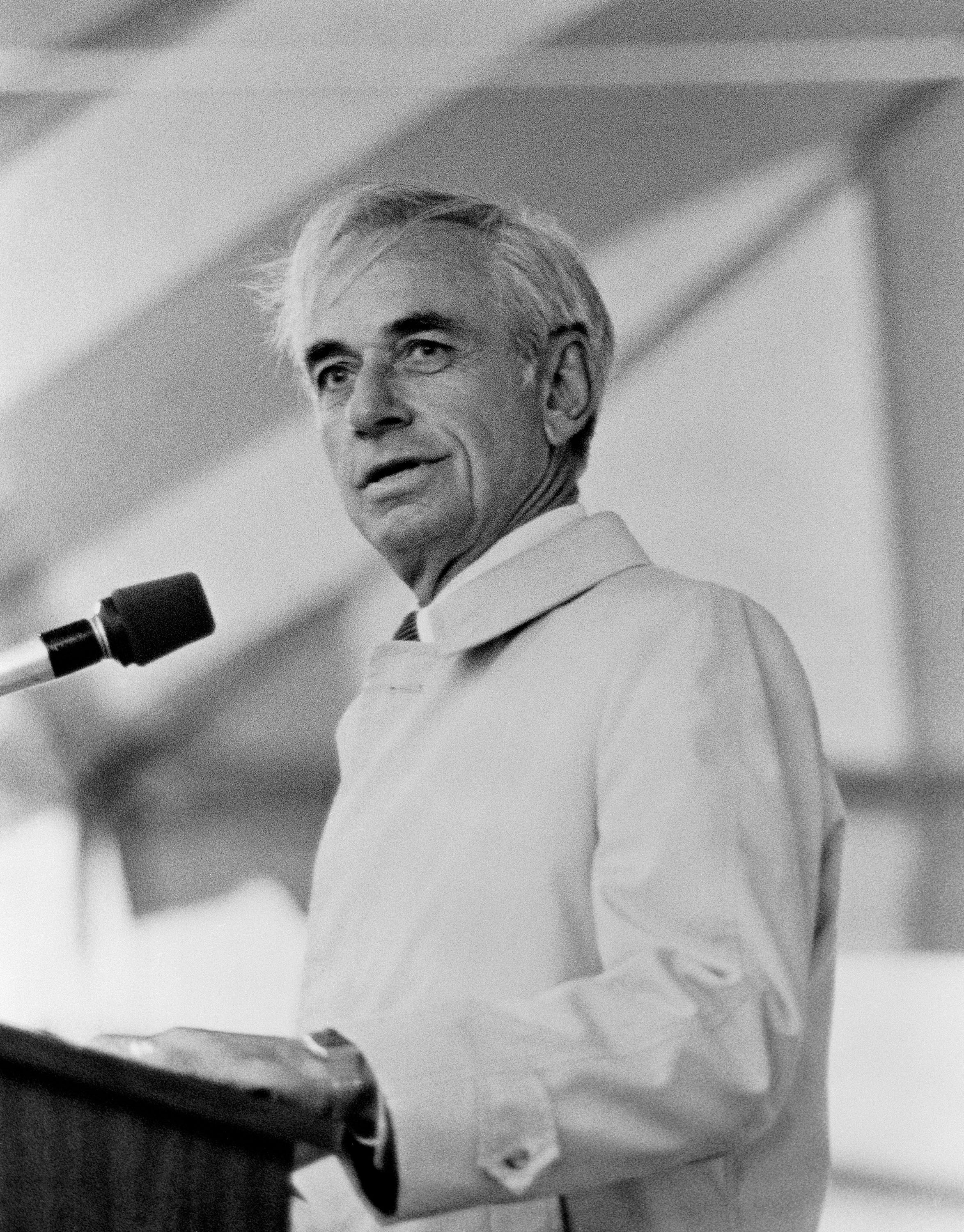
- Robert H. Wertheim at the commissioning of the dock landing ship USS Fort McHenry (LSD-43) in 1986
- Born: 9 November 1922; Carlsbad, New Mexico, United States
- Died: 29 April 2020 (aged 97)
- Burial place: Miramar National Cemetery
- Alma mater: New Mexico Military Institute; United States Naval Academy; Massachusetts Institute of Technology
- Spouse(s): Barbara (1946–2001); Joan
- Children: 2
- Military career
- Allegiance: United States
- Branch: United States Navy
- Service years: 1942–1980
- Rank: Rear Admiral
- Nickname: Bob
- Commands: United States Navy Strategic Systems Project Office
- Conflicts: World War II: Occupation of Japan
- Awards: Navy Distinguished Service Medal with a gold star; Legion of Merit; Defense Meritorious Service Medal; Joint Service Commendation Medal; Navy Commendation Medal

Robert "Bob" Wertheim (9 November 1922 – 29 April 2020) was an American naval officer involved in the development of strategic weapons. Senator Robert Byrd described him as "the Navy's leading authority on strategic missiles". He was also referred to by his nickname, Bob.

Born and raised in New Mexico, Wertheim attended the New Mexico Military Institute before appointment to the United States Naval Academy. He graduated in time to join in the occupation of Japan. Returning to the United States, Wertheim began a long involvement in missile development, including work on the Regulus cruise missile, Polaris ballistic missile, Chaparral anti-aircraft missile, Poseidon ballistic missile, and Trident ballistic missile. During his time working on missile development, he graduated from the Massachusetts Institute of Technology. After retiring from the United States Navy as a rear admiral (upper half), he was a senior vice president at Lockheed Corporation, and engaged in consulting work.

== Early life ==
Robert Halley Wertheim was born to Joseph Wertheim and Emma Vorenberg in Carlsbad, New Mexico on 9 November 1922. (Note: Joseph Wertheim emigrated from Brakel, Germany to Tucumcari, New Mexico, with the financial assistance of his cousin Jacob in 1906. Emma Vorenberg was Joseph's third cousin. Joseph worked as a traveling salesman, a multi-location clothes shop proprietor, cotton broker, and insurance agent. Joseph Wertheim died on 4 January 1950; some of his papers have been archived in the Harriet Rochlin Collection of Western Jewish History at the University of California, Los Angeles. Emma died in November 1982, having continued to run an insurance business named after Joseph with their daughter Jeanette until her death. Jeanette, who later married Norman E. Sparks in 1956, died in 2004.) Robert graduated from Carlsbad High School. Following the attack on Pearl Harbor, he enrolled into the New Mexico Military Institute; graduating in 1942. Receiving an appointment from a New Mexico senator, he continued his education at the United States Naval Academy. At the Naval Academy, he competed on the school's fencing team. He graduated with honors in 1945, and he was commissioned as an ensign upon graduation as part of an accelerated wartime program.

== Military service ==
Following his graduation from the Naval Academy, Wertheim's first assignment was on the destroyer USS Hyman, on which he participated in the occupation of Japan. Transferred to the destroyer USS Bordelon at Okinawa, he served as the ship's assistant engineering officer and communications officer, before being sent to San Francisco to attend electronics school. Upon completing electronics school, Wertheim was assigned to the destroyer escort USS Maloy, which spent the winter of 1947 providing electricity to Maine.

Following his assignment to Maloy, Wertheim was reassigned to Sandia Base, where he was a member of the Navy's first nuclear bomb assembly team. He wished to study nuclear physics, but was due for a sea assignment; accordingly, he selected the seaplane tender USS Norton Sound, which was used to test guided missiles. In 1951, Wertheim attended and graduated from the Naval Postgraduate School. In 1954, Wertheim enrolled at the Massachusetts Institute of Technology, earning a master's degree in nuclear physics. That same year, he was detailed to the heavy cruiser USS Los Angeles while it had SSM-N-8 Regulus missiles embarked. As a lieutenant in 1955, Wertheim headed the group that worked on the design of the atmospheric reentry body of the warheads mounted onto the UGM-27 Polaris. In June 1956, Wertheim was assigned to the United States Navy Special Projects Office, originally part of the Bureau of Ordnance, where he stayed until June 1961. During that time he continued the work he began in 1955, heading the Re-Entry Body Section, receiving the Navy Commendation Medal for his efforts.

After assignment to the Special Projects Office, Wertheim was assigned to the Naval Ordnance Test Station in California from 1961 to 1962. While there, he worked on the development of the AIM-9 Sidewinder for naval surface air defense, called Osprey, which was ultimately cancelled in 1963; he was able to take that work and utilize it for the Army and Marine Corps Air Defense Artillery, including influencing the naming of the system, the MIM-72 Chaparral, Chaparral being the name for a roadrunner in Mexican Spanish, the state bird for Wertheim's home state.

In late 1962, Wertheim was reassigned to the Pentagon, serving under the Director of Defense Research and Engineering Harold Brown, whom he had met while working on the Polaris missile. That same year, Wertheim was tasked with writing a report for the United States that advocated for the adoption of the Polaris missile by the United Kingdom instead of the continuing to develop independently the cancelled GAM-87 Skybolt. (Note: During the Presidency of Dwight D. Eisenhower the United States had sold the United Kingdom the Skybolt system which would be armed with warheads of the United Kingdom.) Wertheim was involved in the Skybolt project, and its cancelation during his time working for the Director of Defense Research and Engineering. The cancelation of the Skybolt system was due to it failing five of its initial launch tests. With the report written by Wertheim in hand, President John F. Kennedy met with Prime Minister Harold Macmillan convincing the United Kingdom to not continue development of the Skybolt system, and adopt the Polaris ballistic missile as its nuclear deterrent.

Wertheim remained at the Pentagon as the Military Assistant for Strategic Weapons until August 1965, which earned him a Joint Service Commendation Medal. During those years, he was instrumental in having the Strategic Projects Office increase the UGM-73 Poseidon's targeting accuracy by switching the missile's guidance system from only inertial to stellar-inertial guidance. He returned to the Special Projects Office in Washington, D.C., in late 1965.

In 1971, Wertheim was elevated to the rank of rear admiral. That year, he was awarded the Rear Admiral William S. Parsons Award by the Navy League of the United States. (Note: The Rear Admiral William S. Parsons Award is awarded for scientific and technical progress.) In 1977, he was elected as a member of the National Academy of Engineering, (Note: Wertheim made significant fiscal contributions to the National Academy of Engineering's parent organization, the National Academy of Sciences.) and he became the Director of the Strategic Systems Projects. (Note: Special Projects Office was renamed to Strategic Systems Projects Office in 1968.) In April 1979, Senator Robert Byrd said that Wertheim "is the Navy's leading authority on strategic missiles"; in addition to work on the Polaris and Poseidon missiles, Wertheim had also made significant contributions to the development of the Trident missile family. In October 1979, Wertheim was awarded the Navy Distinguished Service Medal. During his career Wertheim was also awarded a second Navy Distinguished Service Medal, Legion of Merit, and the Defense Meritorious Service Medal. In 1980, Wertheim finally retired from the United States Navy.

== Post-military life ==
Wertheim was a member of Sigma Xi and Tau Beta Pi. For seven years, beginning in 1981, he was the senior vice president of science and engineering of Lockheed Corporation. In 1983, along with several other dozen retired flag officers, they took out a full-page advertisement in the Washington Times condemning retired Rear Admiral Gene La Rocque for appearing on Soviet Union television and himself condemning the defense policy of the United States. In 1987, the New Mexico Military Institute inducted him into their hall of fame.

Beginning in 1988, Wertheim became a private consultant with Science Applications International Corporation. He also did consulting work with the Lawrence Livermore National Laboratory, Los Alamos National Laboratory, United States Department of Defense, and the Draper Laboratory. In 2000, on behalf of the University of California, he was the lead of a review of Los Alamos National Laboratory after hard drives temporarily went missing. In 2005, the alumni association of the Naval Academy awarded him their Distinguished Graduate Award Medal. (Note: That same year, the Distinguished Graduate Award Medal was given to Slade Cutter, Ronald J. Hays, and Ross Perot.) The next year, he was given the Distinguished Submariner Award by the Naval Submarine League. In 2008, he was a member of the Defense Science Board's Permanent Task Force on Nuclear Weapons Surety. Wertheim was also a recipient of the Secretary of Defense Medal for Outstanding Public Service and the Chairman of the Joint Chiefs of Staff Joint Distinguished Civilian Service Award.

== Personal life and death ==
In April 1946, Wertheim became engaged to Barbara Louis Selig of West Los Angeles; they married in December 1946. She was the mother of their two children. She died in 2001. By 2005, Wertheim had remarried, to Joan Levin. (Note: In 2015, Joan and Robert made a donation to Independence Day events in Rancho Bernardo, San Diego. In 2016, Joan made a donation to a psychiatric non-profit organization.) In 2005, Wertheim spoke to The New Mexico Jewish Historical Society. In 2012, his son Joseph died in Pittsburgh. (Note: His son Joseph, was also an alumnus of the New Mexico Military Institute. Both his son, and he, supported Denis Theatre.) On 29 April 2020, Wertheim died; he was buried in Section 11 of Miramar National Cemetery.
