= Willard Fazar =

American economist

Willard R. Fazar (March 16, 1915 - September 13, 1997) was an American economist, Head of the Program Evaluation Branch at Special Projects Office, U.S. Navy, and author. He is known as one of co-inventors, and key-developers of PERT."

== Biography ==
Born in 1915, Fazar studied economics at Cornell University, and obtained his Ms in Agriculture in 1936.

After graduation Fazar started his career in industry, and in his early career worked at Wall Street, R. H. Macy & Co and US Steel Export Co., and did industrial price research for the Government. In World War II he served in the army, and afterwards joined the Bureau of Labor Statistics in Washington, D. C., where he was appointed chief of the food section.

In 1956 Fazar was appointed by US Navy Admiral William Raborn as director of the program evaluation branch of the special projects office of the Navy, and was charged to "overcome the management challenge presented by the Polaris program." Around 1967 Fazar was appointed at the U.S. Bureau of the Budget, where he worked in operations research.

== Work ==
=== Development of PERT ===
After his appointment at the Special Projects Office (SPO) as director of the program evaluation branch in 1956, Fazar played a key role in the development of PERT. James Jerome O'Brien (1969) summarized, the events that lead to that development:

"[In the fall of 1957 Fazar had noted, that]... it was clear that the various management tools available for management of the Polaris program did not provide certain information essential to effective program evaluation. In particular, they did not furnish the following:
1. Appraisal of the validity of existing plans in terms of meeting program objectives
2. Measurement of progress achieved against program objectives
3. Measurement of potential for meeting program objectives
The search for a better management system continued through the fall of 1957. At this time, the Navy was cognizant of the development of CPM at Du Pont. In January, 1958, the SPO initiated a special study to determine whether computers could be used in planning and controlling the Polaris program, and on January 27, 1958, the SPO directed a group to undertake the task of formulating the PERT technique. The goal of the group was to determine whether improved planning and evaluating research and development work methods could be devised to apply to the Polaris program, which involved 250 prime contractors and more than 9000 subcontractors."

About the organizational context and Fazar's performance Frederick I. Ordway (2014) once more summarized the circumstances in which PERT saw the first light of day and the participants involved :

"In 1956, a Special Projects Office (SPO) was organized by the Department of the Navy to manage the Polaris program. Numerous management tools, some old, some newly developed, were used by SPO.
However, despite the merits of these procedures, additional information was needed to assess the validity of plans and schedules, to measure research and development progress where the standard measure-money spent—did not necessarily correlate with progress, and to predict the probability of meeting objectives. In February, 1958, a team was organized by SPO to produce a system to do these things. The team consisted of personnel from SPO, consultants from Booz, Allen, and Hamilton, and specialists from the Missiles and Space Division of Lockheed. Willard Fazar, credited with guiding PERT's development, was team manager...

Some basic concepts were introduced by Fazar and his team, as Ordway (2014) further explained:

"...Due to the urgent nature of the Polaris program, and the particular importance of time in the missile and space industry, it was decided to use time as a common denominator in the system. A significant change in resources or technology always means a significant change in time, and in the defense industry cost is often less important than time and may be dependent on time.
PERT, then, is developed around a time sequence flow diagram. MileStones representing important events in the life of the project are selected and linked graphically with arrows to portray interdependencies. Actual work activity is represented by the arrows joining the milestones, and the resulting flow diagram that is structured around these important events is called the PERT network.
Times necessary to complete each task between events are estimated in such a way as to give an appropriate measure of uncertainty. The most likely time, optimistic time, and pessimistic time, ... "

=== Presentation of PERT ===
In a 1959 article in The American Statistician Fazar summarized the development of the Program evaluation and review technique in his own words, stating:

"The Navy's Special Projects Office, charged with developing the Polaris-Submarine weapon system and the Fleet Ballistic Missile capability, has developed a statistical technique for measuring and forecasting progress in research and development programs. This Program Evaluation and Review Technique (code-named PERT) is applied as a decision-making tool designed to save time in achieving end-objectives, and is of particular interest to those engaged in research and development programs for which time is a critical factor.
The new technique takes recognition of three factors that influence successful achievement of research and development program objectives: time, resources, and technical performance specifications. PERT employs time as the variable that reflects planned resource applications and performance specifications. With units of time as a common denominator, PERT quantifies knowledge about the uncertainties involved in developmental programs requiring effort at the edge of, or beyond, current knowledge of the subject – effort for which little or no previous experience exists...
The concept of PERT was developed by an operations research team staffed with representatives from the Operations Research Department of Booz, Allen and Hamilton; the Evaluation Office of the Lockheed Missile Systems Division; and the Program Evaluation Branch, Special Projects Office, of the Department of the Navy."

=== Reduction of R&D cycle ===
As member of the Polaris management team, Fazar in 1961 was cited in the Missiles and Rockets. journal explaining the power of PERT. He had stated:

"... modern system management technique have enabled us to reduce the R&D cycle, for major weapon systems, from 7-10 years to 3 years; we are confident that the cycle duration will be reduced even further as the full potential of the PERT approach is realized."

== Selected publications ==
- Willard Fazar. The Regulation and Taxation of the Motor Truck, Cornell Univ., 1936.
- U.S. Dept. of the Navy. Program Evaluation Research Task, Summary Report, Phase 1. Washington, D.C., Government Printing Office, 1958.
- U.S. Dept. of the Navy. Program Evaluation Research Task, Summary Report, Phase 2. Washington, D.C., Government Printing Office, 1958.
- Fazar, Willard. Progress Reporting in the Special Projects Office. 1961.OCLC 39268502

Articles, a selection

- Malcolm, Donald G., Roseboom, J. H., Clark, C. E., & Fazar, W. (1959). Application of a technique for research and development program evaluation. Operations research, 7(5), 646–669.
- Fazar, Willard. "Program evaluation and review technique." The American Statistician 13.2 (1959): 10.
- Fazar, Willard. "The origin of PERT." The Controller 30 (1962): 598.
- Fazar, Willard. "Federal information communities: the systems approach." Paper delivered at the 1966 Annual Meeting of the American Political Science Association. 1966.
