= Donald G. Malcolm =

- Born: March 26, 1919; Indianapolis, Indiana, United States
- Died: June 18, 2007; Santa Monica, California, United States
- Education: Purdue University
- Occupations: Organizational theorist, professor, management consultant
- Employer(s): California State University, Los Angeles, Booz Allen Hamilton, Management Technology Inc.
- Known for: Co-developer of PERT (Program Evaluation and Review Technique)
- Title: Dean of the College of Business and Economics (1972–1981)
- Awards: Distinguished Alumnus Award, Purdue University (1965)

Donald G. Malcolm (March 26, 1919 - June 18, 2007) was an American organizational theorist, professor and dean at Cal State L.A.'s College of Business and Economics and management consultant, known as co-developer of the Performance, Evaluation, and Review Technique (PERT).

== Biography ==
Malcolm was born and raised in Indianapolis. In 1940 he obtained his BSc in Public Service Engineering from Purdue University, and after the war his MSc in industrial engineering.

In World War II Malcolm served on an aircraft carrier in the Pacific as radioman. After his graduation Malcolm started his academic career as research team leader of the Operations Research Team at the Johns Hopkins University. In 1950 he was lecturer in Mechanical Engineering, and by 1952 assistant professor of industrial engineering at the University of California, Berkeley.

In the 1950s he was also management consultant for Booz, Allen and Hamilton in Chicago, Illinois, and in those days participated with the US Navy Special Projects Office, especially with Willard Fazar, in the development of PERT. In 1954-1955 he was president of the American Institute of Industrial Engineers, now Institute of Industrial and Systems Engineers.

In 1962 he settled as management consultant with his own consultancy firm Management Technology Inc. From 1962 to 1967 he also directed the National Safety Standards division of the US Department of Transportation. From 1970 he was one of the Senior Vice Presidents of Computer Applications, Inc., and from 1972 to 1981 he served as dean of the College of Business and Economics at the California State University, Los Angeles.

In 1963 he published a review of Cybernetics—in the Service of Communism.This raised concerns that the Soviet Union might use cybernetics to outstrip the US in terms of economic development.

In 1965 Malcolm was awarded a Distinguished Alumnus Award from Purdue University. After his retired in 1981 and Malcolm moved to the Hawaiian island of Maui, where he remained active for many more years. In the new millennium he had moved back to the mainland, and died in 2007 at his home in Santa Monica.

== Work ==
=== Team leader on operations research projects ===
Malcolm made his most notable contributions as team leader on specific operations research projects. The Los Angeles Times (2007) summarized:

"From the mid 1950s he was a team leader on operations research projects at Booz Allen in Chicago; the Systems Development Corp., and Operations Research, Inc. in Santa Monica. While at Booz Allen, he headed the research team that developed the original PERT System for the Navy's first submarine-launched ballistic missile, the Polaris. During this time frame, he also led the team designing the first computer -based Business Game for the American Management Association, which was the model for many such computer simulations in subsequent years."

== Selected publications ==
- Donald G. Malcolm, Ernest Paul DeGarmo, Visual Inspection of Products for Surface Characteristics in Grading Operations, U.S. Department of Agriculture, Production and Marketing Administration, 1953.
- Malcolm, Donald G., and Alan J. Rowe (eds.) Management control systems: the proceedings of a symposium. Wiley, 1960.
- Donald G. Malcolm. Management and the engineer--harnessing technology in pursuit of better management, College of Engineering, West Virginia University, 1974.

Articles, a selection

- Bellman, R., Clark, C. E., Malcolm, D. G., Craft, C. J., & Ricciardi, F. M. (1957). "On the construction of a multi-stage, multi-person business game." Operations Research, 5(4), 469–503.
- Malcolm, Donald G. "System simulation—a fundamental tool for industrial engineering." Journal of Industrial Engineering 9.3 (1958).
- Malcolm, Donald G., Roseboom, J. H., Clark, C. E., & Fazar, W. (1959). "Application of a technique for research and development program evaluation." Operations research, 7(5), 646–669.
- Malcolm, Donald G. "Bibliography on the use of simulation in management analysis." Operations Research 8.2 (1960): 169–177.
- Malcolm, Donald G. "Exploring the Military Analogy—Real-Time Management Control." See Ref 31 (1960): 187–207.
- Malcolm, Donald G. "On the Need for Improvement in Implementation of OR." Management Science 11.4 (1965): B-48.
