= Rear Admiral William S. Parsons Award =

Navy League of the United States award

The Rear Admiral William S. Parsons Award for Scientific and Technical Progress is awarded each year by the Navy League of the United States to a Navy or Marine Corps officer, enlisted person or civilian, who has made an outstanding contribution in any field of science that has furthered the development and progress of the US Navy or Marine Corps. The award is named for Admiral William Sterling Parsons. The award is presented with a certificate and a watch along with other Professional Excellence Awards (Sea Service Awards) at the National Convention of the Navy League of the United States.

The award is described by the Navy League of the United States as: "The Rear Admiral William S. Parsons Award is named for Admiral Parsons in recognition of his dedication to all aspects of scientific and technical advances and who was responsible to a marked degree for ensuring that the U.S. Navy remained in operational consonance with the ever-shifting and increasing demands of the changing world. Presented since 1957, this award for scientific and technical progress is awarded to a Navy or Marine Corps officer, enlisted person or civilian who has made an outstanding contribution in any field of science that has furthered the development and progress of the Navy or Marine Corps."

== List of award winners ==
The following is the list of recipients: (Note: A list of Awards through 2015 was provided by the Navy League of the United States. Starting with the July–August 2016 issue of Sea Power, the Navy League began publishing recipients of their Sea Service Awards. The Rear Admiral William S. Parsons Award was not included in the 2016 issue but was included for 2017.)

Year	Recipient
1957	Lieutenant Commander Malcolm D. Ross, USN
1958	Rear Admiral William F. Raborn, USN
1959	Vice Admiral J. T. Hayward, USN
1960	Captain Ashton Graybeil (MG), USN
1961	Captain Levering Smith, USN
1962	Admiral John H. Sides, USN
1963	Captain Parker L. Folsom, USN
1964	Rear Admiral Denys W. Knoll, USN
1965	The Honorable James H. Wakelin, Jr.
1966	Dr. John P. Craven
1967	Captain J. Edward Snyder, Jr., USN
1968	Captain Robert C. Goodwing, USN
1969	Rear Admiral Odale D. Waters, Jr., USN
1970	Captain Charles "Pete" Conrad, Jr., USN, Captain Richard F. Gordon, Jr. USN, Captain Alan L. Bean, USN
1971	Captain Robert H. Wertheim, USN
1972	Commander Don Walsh, USN
1973	Captain Earle W. Sapp, USN, Commander Paul A. Petzrick, USN
1974	William M. Emshwiller, Master Sergeant John H. Ballard, USMC
1975	Gerald C. Gould, Lieutenant Phillip I. Harvey, USN
1976	Commander Lorin W. Brown, USN
1977	Dr. William Wynn
1978	Robert M. Williams, Dr. Robert J. Lundegard
1979	Captain Alfred Skolnick, USN
1980	Rear Admiral Glenwood Clark, Jr., USN, Lieutenant Kenneth W. Kizer, MC, USNR
1981	Robert W. Fett
1982	Dr. William A. McNally
1983	Commander Wayne A. Clarke, USN, CWO-4 Bruce M. Wincentsen, USMC
1984	Dr. Alan R. Somoroff
1985	Rear Admiral Wayne Eugene Meyer, USN
1986	Dr. Jerome Karle
1987	John R. Andreotti
1988	Dr. Isabella L. Karle
1989	Lieutenant Commander Terry Lee Eby, USN
1990	Captain Katherine L. Laughton, USN
1991	Mr. Charles D. Johnson, Walter Zeitfuss, Jr.
1992	Mr. Robert J. Boswell, Captain George B. Brown, USMC
1993	Colonel Curtis T. Crews, USMC, Captain Barry Frederick Schwoerer, USN
1994	Captain Bruce B. Scott, USN
1995	Ms. Bernadette J. Eichinger
1996	Captain William J. Dvorak, USMC
1997	Mr. Howard T. Kauderer
1998	Dr. Barry L. Howell
1999	Lieutenant Commander Gary R. Schram, USN
2000	Mr. David B. Pye
2001	Mr. Max N. Yoder
2002	Dr. Donald A. Birchler
2003	Captain Peter M. Grant, USN
2004	Dr. Allen T. Hjelmfelt
2005	Lieutenant Commander Michael J. Schiller, USN
2006	Mr. Elmer L. Roman
2007	Mr. Bruce D. Wintersteen
2008	Mr. John Locke
2009	Corporal Brian Carter, USMC
2010	Lieutenant Commander (Select) Brian Barrick, USN
2011	Mr. Jason E. Tant
2012	Major Billy J. Short, Jr., USMC
2013	Dr. Pierre J. Corriveau
2014	LCDR Joshua A. Hengst, USN
2015	Dr. Wayne Chepren
2016	
2017	Dr. Mary Ann Cummings
2018	
2019	
2020	Lieutenant Commander Austin West
