= USS George Washington (SSBN-598) =

George Washington class submarine

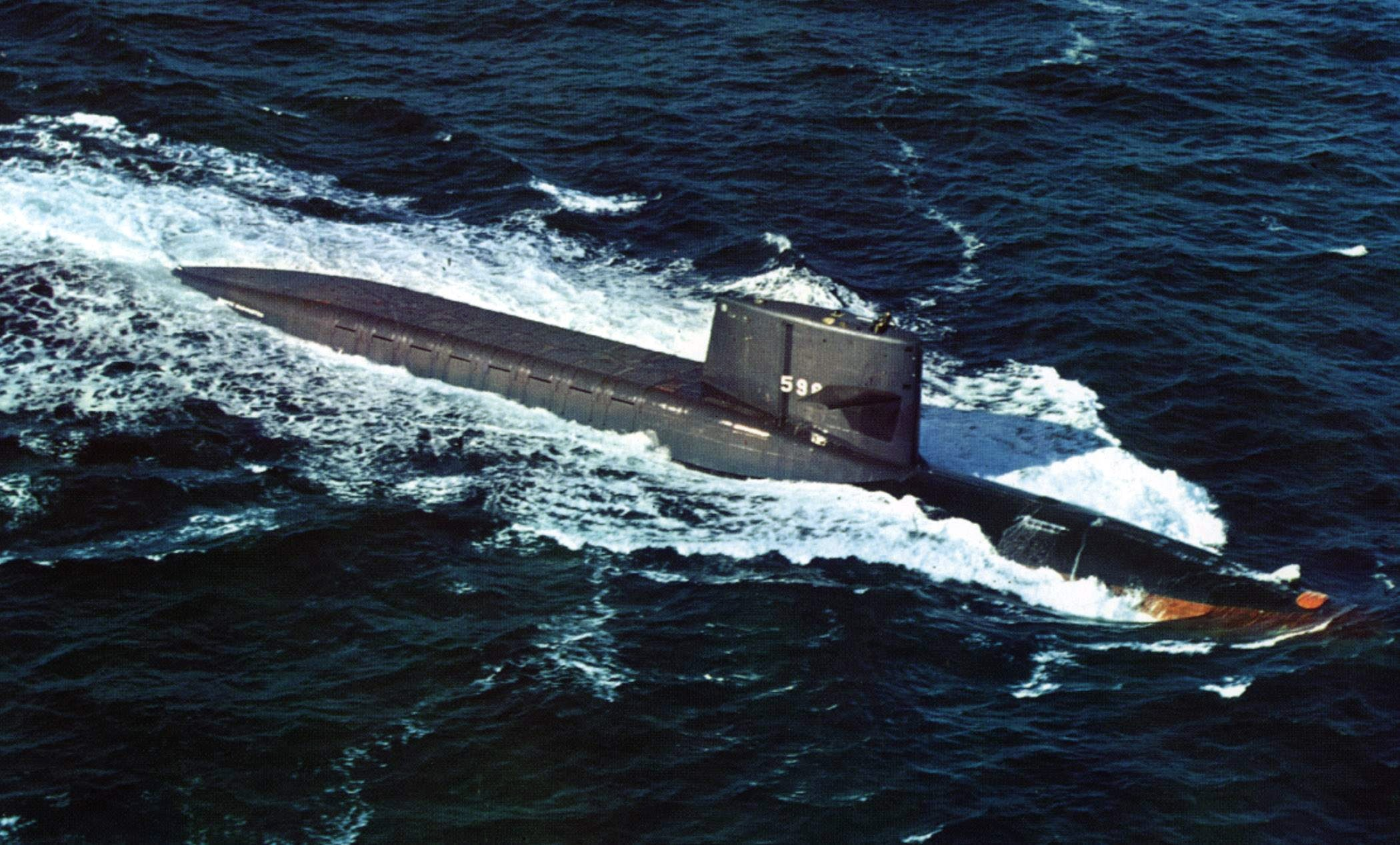
- USS George Washington (SSBN-598)

History

United States
- Name: George Washington
- Namesake: President George Washington (1732–1799)
- Owner: United States Navy
- Ordered: 31 December 1957
- Builder: General Dynamics Electric Boat
- Laid down: 1 November 1958
- Launched: 9 June 1959
- Commissioned: 30 December 1959
- Decommissioned: 24 January 1985
- Stricken: 30 April 1986
- Home port: Pearl Harbor, Hawaii
- Motto: Primus in pace ("First in peace")
- Nickname(s): "The Georgefish"
- Fate: Recycling via the Ship-Submarine Recycling Program completed 30 September 1998
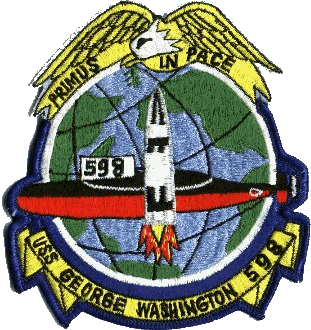
- Badge

General characteristics
- Class & type: George Washington-class submarine
- Type: SSBN (hull design SCB-180A)
- Displacement: 5400 tons light; 5959–6019 tons surfaced; 6709–6888 Approx. tons submerged
- Length: 381 ft 7.2 in (116.312 m)
- Beam: 33 ft (10 m)
- Draft: 29 ft (8.8 m)
- Installed power: 15,000 shp (11,000 kW)
- Propulsion: 1 × S5W PWR; 2 × geared turbines; 1 × 7-bladed screw
- Speed: 20 kn (37 km/h) surfaced; +25 kn (46 km/h) submerged
- Range: unlimited except by food supplies
- Test depth: 700 ft (210 m) (maximum over 900 ft (270 m))
- Capacity: 120
- Complement: Two crews (Blue/Gold) each consisting of 12 officers and 100 men.
- Armament: 16 Polaris A1/A3 missiles; 6 × 21 in (530 mm) torpedo tubes (Mark 16, Mark 37, or Mark 48 torpedoes)

USS George Washington (SSBN-598) was the United States's first operational ballistic missile submarine. She was the lead ship of her class of nuclear ballistic missile submarines, was the third United States Navy ship of the name, in honor of Founding Father George Washington (1732–1799), the first president of the United States, and was the first of that name to be purpose-built as a warship.

== Construction and launching ==
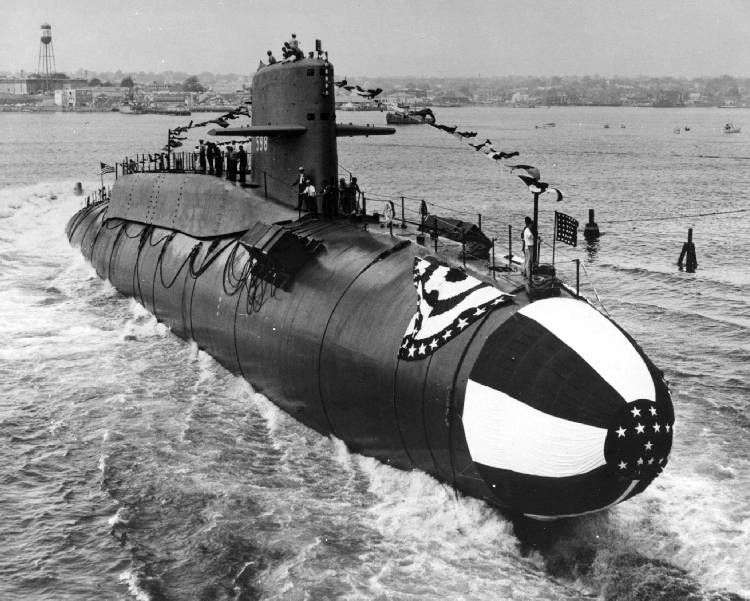
George Washington during her launching ceremony in Groton.

George Washington's keel was laid down at Electric Boat Division of General Dynamics, Groton, Connecticut on 1 November 1958. The first of her class, she was launched on 9 June 1959 sponsored by Mrs. Ollie Mae Anderson (née Rawlins), wife of US Treasury Secretary and former Secretary of the Navy Robert B. Anderson, and commissioned on 30 December 1959 as SSBN-598 with Commander James B. Osborn in command of the Blue crew and Commander John L. From Jr. in command of the Gold crew.

George Washington was originally laid down as the attack submarine USS Scorpion (SSN-589). During construction, she was lengthened by the insertion of a 130 ft (40 m)-long ballistic missile section and renamed George Washington; another submarine under construction at the time received the original name and hull number. Inside George Washington's forward escape hatch, a plaque remained bearing her original name. Because the ballistic missile compartment design of George Washington was intended to be reused in later ship classes, the section inserted into George Washington was designed with a deeper test depth rating than the rest of the submarine.

== Initial operations ==
Universal International Newsreel of first submerged Polaris firing on 20 July 1960

George Washington left Groton on 28 June 1960 for Cape Canaveral, Florida, where she loaded two Polaris missiles. Standing out into the Atlantic Missile Test Range with Rear Admiral William Raborn, head of the Polaris submarine development program, on board as an observer, she successfully conducted the first Polaris missile launch from a submerged submarine on 20 July 1960. At 12:39, George Washington's commanding officer sent President Dwight Eisenhower the message: POLARIS - FROM OUT OF THE DEEP TO TARGET. PERFECT. Less than two hours later a second missile from the submarine also struck the impact area 1,100 nmi (1,300 mi; 2,000 km) downrange.

George Washington then embarked her Gold crew, and on 30 July 1960 she launched two more missiles while submerged. Shakedown for the Gold crew ended at Groton on 30 August and the boat got underway from that port on 28 October for Naval Weapons Station Charleston, to load her full complement of 16 Polaris missiles. There she was awarded the Navy Unit Commendation, after which her Blue crew took over and embarked on her first deterrent patrol.

The submarine completed her first patrol after 66 days of submerged running on 21 January 1961, and put in at Naval Submarine Base New London at New London, Connecticut. The Gold crew took over and departed on her next patrol on 14 February 1961. After the patrol, she entered Holy Loch, Scotland, on 25 April 1961.

In 1970 ten years after her initial departure from Groton, George Washington put in to refuel in Charleston SC, having cruised some 100,000 nmi (120,000 mi; 190,000 km).

George Washington shifted to the United States Pacific Fleet and a new home port at Pearl Harbor, Hawaii after the refueling.

== Collision with Nissho Maru ==
On 9 April 1981, George Washington was at periscope depth and was broadsided by the 2,350 long tons (2,390 t) Japanese commercial cargo ship Nissho Maru in the East China Sea about 110 nmi (130 mi; 200 km) south-southwest of Sasebo, Japan. George Washington immediately surfaced and searched for the other vessel. Owing to the heavy fog conditions at the time, they did see the Nissho Maru heading off into the fog, but it appeared undamaged. It headed into port for repairs; the crew was later flown back to Pearl Harbor from Guam. Unbeknownst to the crew of the George Washington, Nissho Maru sank in about 15 minutes. Two Japanese crewmen were lost; 13 were rescued by Japan Maritime Self-Defense Force destroyers JDS Akigumo (DD-120) and Aogumo (ja). The submarine suffered minor damage to her sail.

The accident strained U.S.–Japanese relations a month before a meeting between Japanese Prime Minister Zenko Suzuki and President of the United States Ronald Reagan. Japan criticized the U.S. for taking more than 24 hours to notify Japanese authorities, and demanded to know what the boat was doing surfacing only about 20 nmi (23 mi; 37 km) outside Japan's territorial waters.

The U.S. Navy initially stated that George Washington executed a crash dive during the collision, and then immediately surfaced, but could not see the Japanese ship due to fog and rain (according to a U.S. Navy report). A preliminary report released a few days later stated the submarine and aircraft crews both had detected Nissho Maru nearby, but neither the submarine nor the aircraft realized Nissho Maru was in distress.

On 11 April, President Reagan and other U.S. officials formally expressed regret over the accident, made offers of compensation, and reassured the Japanese there was no cause for worry about radioactive contamination. As is its standard policy, the U.S. Government refused to reveal what the submarine was doing close to Japan, or whether she was armed with nuclear missiles. (It is government and navy policy to neither confirm nor deny the presence of nuclear weapons on board.) The Navy accepted responsibility for the incident, and relieved and reprimanded the George Washington's commanding officer and officer of the deck.

On 31 August, the U.S. Navy released its final report, concluding the accident resulted from a set of coincidences, compounded by errors on the part of two members of the submarine crew.

After the collision with the Nissho Maru, the damaged sail was repaired with parts from the sail from the USS Abraham Lincoln which was waiting for disposal at the Puget Sound Naval Shipyard.

== Final patrol as ballistic missile submarine ==
In 1981, George Washington returned to Pearl Harbor from her last missile patrol. In 1981, her missiles were unloaded at Bangor, Washington to comply with the SALT II treaty.

George Washington made 55 deterrent patrols in both the Atlantic and Pacific oceans in her 25-year career.

== Service as an attack submarine ==
George Washington continued service as an attack submarine (SSN), returning briefly to Pearl Harbor. In 1983, she departed Pearl Harbor for the last time and made the second of four transits through the Panama Canal back to the Atlantic and to New London. While based at Submarine Base Groton, George Washington (SSN 598) participated in exercises including one teamed with a Coast Guard Cutter against the USS John F. Kennedy (CV-67) and Carrier Group 4. From Puerto Rico's Roosevelt Roads Naval Station, she provided support for Special Forces training. She participated in the 24th UNITAS exercise as the only US submarine. At the conclusion of exercises with Chile, George Washington completed circumnavigation of South America, escorting John F. Kennedy as she transited open water between Argentina and the Falkland Islands in the early months of 1984.

== Decommissioning ==
George Washington was decommissioned on 24 January 1985, stricken from the Naval Vessel Registry on 30 April 1986, and scheduled for disposal through the Ship-Submarine Recycling Program at Puget Sound Naval Shipyard. Recycling of the ship was completed on 30 September 1998.

== Commemoration ==
George Washington's sail was removed prior to disposal and now rests at the Submarine Force Library and Museum at Groton, Connecticut.

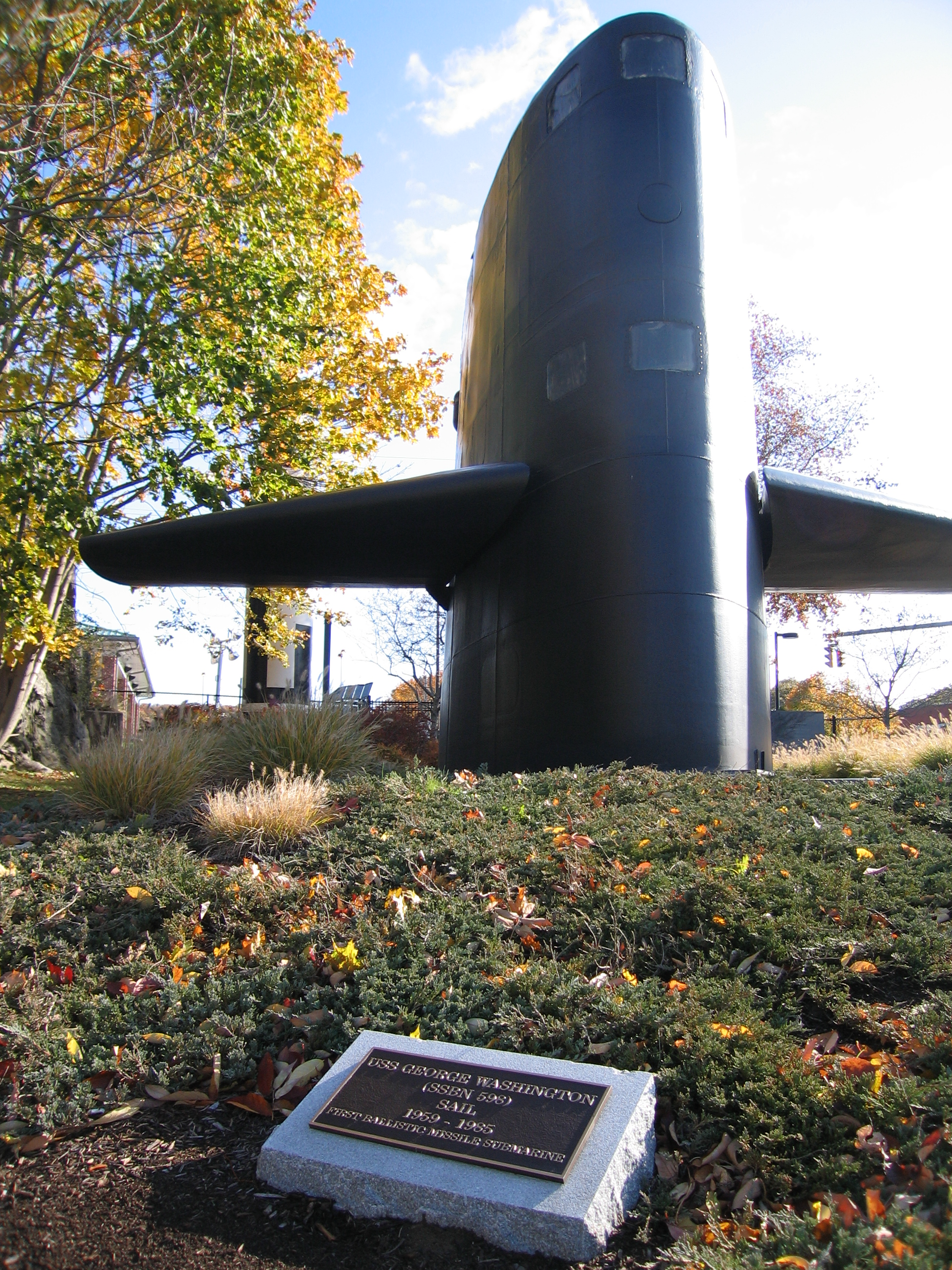
George Washington (SSBN-598) sail outside the Submarine Force Library and Museum, Groton, CT.

== Awards ==
- Navy Unit Commendation
- National Defense Service Medal
