= Wayne E. Meyer =

Rear Admiral in the United States Navy

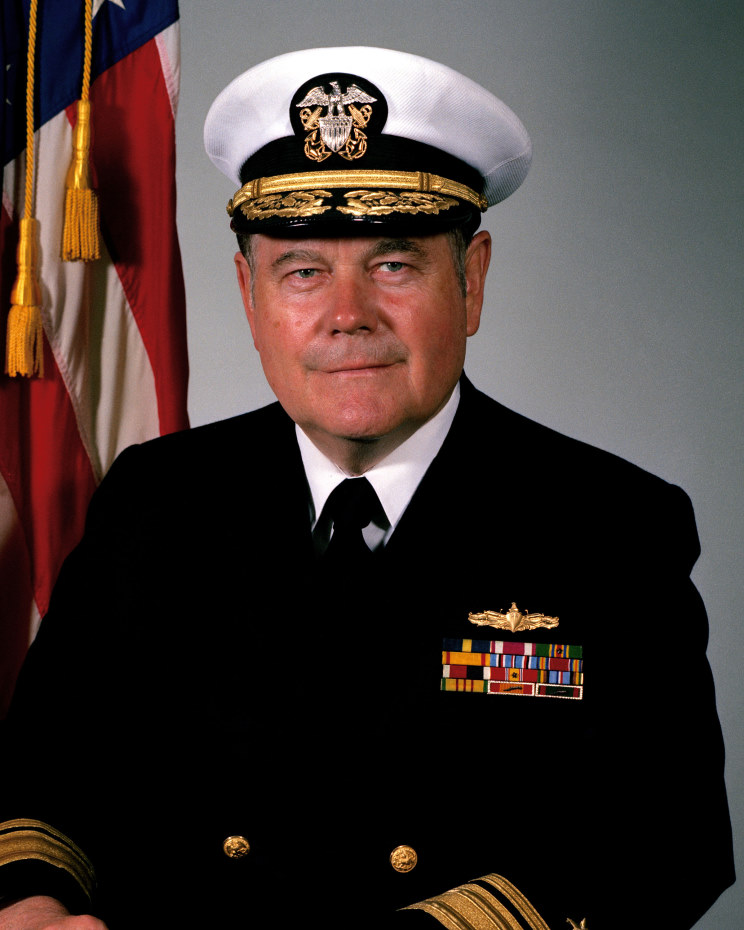
- Rear Admiral Wayne E. Meyer, USN
- Born: April 21, 1926; Brunswick, Missouri, U.S.
- Died: September 1, 2009 (aged 83)
- Burial place: Arlington National Cemetery (Section 8, Site 10252)
- Spouse(s): Margaret (deceased); Anna Mae
- Children: 5
- Military career
- Allegiance: United States of America
- Branch: United States Navy
- Rank: Rear Admiral
- Awards: Navy Distinguished Service Medal; Legion of Merit; Meritorious Service Medal
- Other work: Consultant

Rear Admiral Wayne Eugene Meyer (April 21, 1926 – September 1, 2009) is regarded as the "Father of Aegis" for his 13 years of service as the Aegis Weapon System Manager and later the founding project manager of the Aegis Shipbuilding Project Office. He retired from the United States Navy in 1985 as the Deputy Commander for Weapons and Combat Systems, Naval Sea Systems, Naval Sea Systems Command and Ordnance Officer of the Navy.

== Early childhood ==
Wayne E. Meyer was born to Eugene and Nettie Meyer in Brunswick, Missouri, on April 21, 1926. His first four years of school were in Warden District School (eight grades in one room with a wood stove) under Helen Duncan. His father and family were livestock and grain farmers, plowing the land referred to by locals as the "gumbo". Meyer's father Eugene was displaced in the drought and the Great Depression and lost everything in 1935. He and his family of four children moved eleven miles into clay country five miles North of Brunswick. Wayne and siblings were enrolled in St. Boniface Catholic School, a 2-room schoolhouse. Sister Mary Joann was his teacher for the next four years with grades five through eight combined in one room.

Enrolled in the 140-pupil Brunswick High School in 1939, his primary teacher (and principal) was Miss Edith Marston. Under her tutelage, he and three other boys had been prepared by her to take a three-day Armed Services competitive exam in January 1943, which all passed. In April they were called to Kansas City to examine their physical fitness for enlistment in a competitive college program created by President Roosevelt, called the V-12 in the Navy. Meyer passed the exam.

== Education ==
Meyer graduated from the University of Kansas in 1946 with a Bachelor of Science (B.S.) in Electrical Engineering. He also held a B.S. degree in Electrical Engineering and a Master of Science degree (M.S.) in Aeronautics and Astronautics from the Massachusetts Institute of Technology, and a B.S. degree in electrical engineering from the U.S. Naval Postgraduate School.

== Early career ==
He enlisted in the U.S. Naval Reserve on May 12, 1943, after his parents signed the required papers, as he was only 17 at the time. Meyer graduated from high school on May 23 as president of his class and valedictorian. In June he was called to active duty as Seaman Apprentice, USNR, reporting to the University of Kansas on July 1.

Meyer was enrolled in the university's Engineering School as his primary duty. He completed eight semesters towards his bachelor's degree on February 1, 1946. Later that month the Navy ordered the remainder of that Naval Unit (only 35 out of approximately 500 originally) to be commissioned as Ensign USNR, and the university awarded him a B.S. in Electrical Engineering (with Communications and Pre-Radar option). After 11 months at MIT in Radar/Sonar training (and an additional B.S. in Electrical Engineering with an Electronics option), he was ordered to radar picket destroyer Goodrich. He qualified for Officer of the Deck underway at the age of 20. Meyer subsequently served as part of the Occupation Forces in the Mediterranean along with service in the Greek Civil War. He was part of the force supporting the creation of Israel in 1948. He was also accepted for augmentation and transfer of his officer commission to the Regular Navy that year.

Over the next two decades he served in the occupation forces in Japanese and in Chinese waters. His ship, the light gun cruiser Springfield, was in the mouth of the Huangpu River in March 1949. Probably the last U.S. warship in China, his ship sailed for home only to head to Hunters Point, San Francisco shipyard for decommissioning. From 1951 through 1955, he attended the Joint Guided Missile School, Fort Bliss, Texas, the Naval Line School, Monterey, California, and served as instructor at the Special (atomic) Weapons School, Norfolk, Virginia. He returned to sea as Executive Officer on USS Strickland followed by service on the Staff, Commander, Destroyer Force, Atlantic.

Later, he returned to Monterey to study Ordnance Engineering, followed again by MIT for 12 months. Here he was awarded one of the early master's degrees in Aeronautics and Astronautics. Then he was ordered to the guided-missile cruiser Galveston as Fire Control Officer and subsequently Gunnery Officer for her conversion as the first TALOS Cruiser. He has fired, in exercises and tests, more TALOS missiles than any other person.

== Later career ==
In 1963, Navy Secretary Fred Korth chose then-Commander Meyer to serve in the Navy Task Force for Surface Guided Missile Systems, commanded by RADM Eli T. Reich. His work at the Terrier Desk led to his appointment to lead the engineering effort to shift the 30 Terrier-armed ships from analog to high-speed digital systems. Turning down a destroyer command to continue this prelude to advanced weapons system design, he transferred from unrestricted line officer status to restricted line and was appointed an Ordnance Engineering Duty Officer the same year he was selected for promotion to Captain. He was 40 years old. In 1967, he reported as Director of Engineering at the Naval Ship Missile Systems Engineering Station, Port Hueneme, California (now known as Naval Surface Warfare Center, Port Hueneme Division or NSWC PHD).

In 1970, he was recalled to Washington and reported to the Naval Ordnance Systems Command as Manager, Aegis Weapon System. The Aegis project was begun by the Navy as the Advanced Surface Missile System (ASMS). Following the cancellation of the Typhon project, the Navy began work on ASMS to arm the fleet against the advanced Soviet air threats expected in the 1960s and 1970s. After receiving seven concept proposals from arms makers, the Navy Secretary recalled retired RADM Frederic S. Withington (a former Chief of the Bureau of Ordnance) to active duty to recommend one for development.

Withington delivered a report to the Secretary on May 15, 1965, recommending a phased array S-Band radar to search and track air targets, six slaved X-band radars for illumination and fire control, a digital control system compatible with the Naval Tactical Data System, a standard missile that could be directed in flight, and a dual-rail launcher. The report also recommended choosing a prime contractor to develop the system and improving existing missiles.

In 1969, RCA was awarded a contract to begin development. Meyer arrived in 1970, a leader experienced in system development, familiar with current fleet problems, and savvy enough to deal with the Navy and DoD hierarchy to see the project through to completion.

He insisted upon rigorous system engineering discipline throughout the project, and spent considerable effort ensuring that all participants understood what the system was required to do, and what their role was. Key to specifying and measuring system performance was the development of the three functional cornerstones (Detect, Control, Engage) and the five operational cornerstones:

- Reaction Time
- Firepower
- Electronic Countermeasure and Environmental Immunity
- Continuous Availability
- Area Coverage

Meyer's philosophy of "Build a Little, Test a Little, Learn a Lot" drove the testing and milestones of the Aegis system. Having witnessed problems with existing missile systems related to a lack of testing, tests that incorporated too many objectives, and failed system integration efforts requiring massive "get well" programs, he drove the project to conduct numerous tests in development and in delivery of production gear prior to ship installation.

Meyer was also named Project Manager (the final one) for Surface Missile Systems in 1972, and in July 1974 he was named the first Director of Surface Warfare, in the new Naval Sea Systems Command. He was selected for Rear Admiral in January 1975 at age 49. In July, he became the founding Project Manager, Aegis Shipbuilding, with project code PMS-400.

The design of the first Aegis-equipped ships, the Ticonderoga-class cruisers, took time to develop. Throughout the project's development, the size and armament of the ships were the subject of vigorous debate within the Navy, the Office of the Secretary of Defense, and Congress. The proposed ships ranged from a 5,000-ton "austere" ship promoted by Admiral Zumwalt to a nuclear strike cruiser displacing three times as much. The type of ship, cruiser or destroyer was also a subject of debate. The Aegis system was eventually installed on a modified version of the Spruance-class hull, the first of which was designated as DDG-47, and later changed to CG-47. The ship was appropriated in 1978, and shortly after construction began at Ingalls Shipbuilding in Pascagoula, Mississippi. CG-47 was commissioned on January 22, 1983, and a short nine months later fired guns at Lebanon. Meyer and the project team were proud that the ship was ready to fight so shortly after commissioning.

A second class of Aegis ship began with concept studies in 1978. The class was to replace the aging DDG-2 and DDG-37 class destroyers and handle the same air threats as the CG-47 class. The project responsibility originally lay outside of PMS 400, in another functional code in the Naval Sea Systems Command (NAVSEA 93). However, by May 1982, the project was put under Meyer's control in PMS 400, with a lead ship awarded 1985 to Bath Iron Works, Bath, Maine. Like the Ticonderoga, the ship was designed with an Aegis Combat System, modified for installation in the destroyer and less heavily armed. The ship was commissioned as USS Arleigh Burke on July 4, 1991.

In September 1983, Meyer was reassigned as Deputy Commander, Weapons and Combat Systems, Naval Sea Systems Command. He retired from active duty in 1985. In 1985 the American Society of Naval Engineers presented him with the Society's Harold E. Saunders Award for lifetime contributions to naval engineering

Following the commissioning of USS Ticonderoga, Meyer attended every commissioning of an Aegis ship.

== Recent history ==
Rear Admiral Meyer ran a consultancy with offices in Crystal City, Virginia. He chaired and served on numerous panels and committees chartered by various United States Department of Defense civil and military officials, and was especially involved with the Surface Navy and the Missile Defense Agency (formerly the Ballistic Missile Defense Organization and Strategic Defense Initiative Organization) in developing ballistic missile defense capability for the nation's Aegis fleet of cruisers and destroyers. He continued to live in Falls Church, VA with his wife Anna Mae, stepson Edward and two cats. His late wife Margaret was the sponsor, and his granddaughter Peggy was the Maid of Honor for the Aegis guided-missile cruiser Lake Erie. He has three adult children (Paula, James and Robert), 2 stepchildren (Anna and Edward) and four grandchildren.

RADM Meyer is one of a handful of persons to have a ship named in his honor while still alive. The Chief of Naval Operations announced on November 27, 2006, that USS Wayne E. Meyer (DDG-108) is named in his honor. She is the 85th Aegis ship to be constructed and wields the 100th Aegis system to be delivered to the Navy. She was christened on October 18, 2008, at Bath Iron Works in Maine. Christening speakers included Maine Senators Olympia Snowe & Susan Collins, Maine Congressmen Tom Allen and Michael Michaud, Maine Governor John Baldacci, Chief of Naval Operations Admiral Gary Roughead, Assistant Secretary of the Navy Sean Stackley, Bath Iron Works president Dugan Shipway, and Rear Admiral Meyer.

Admiral Meyer died on September 1, 2009, and was laid to rest at Arlington National Cemetery on September 17, 2009. The ship named in his honor was commissioned on October 10, 2009, in Philadelphia, Pennsylvania.

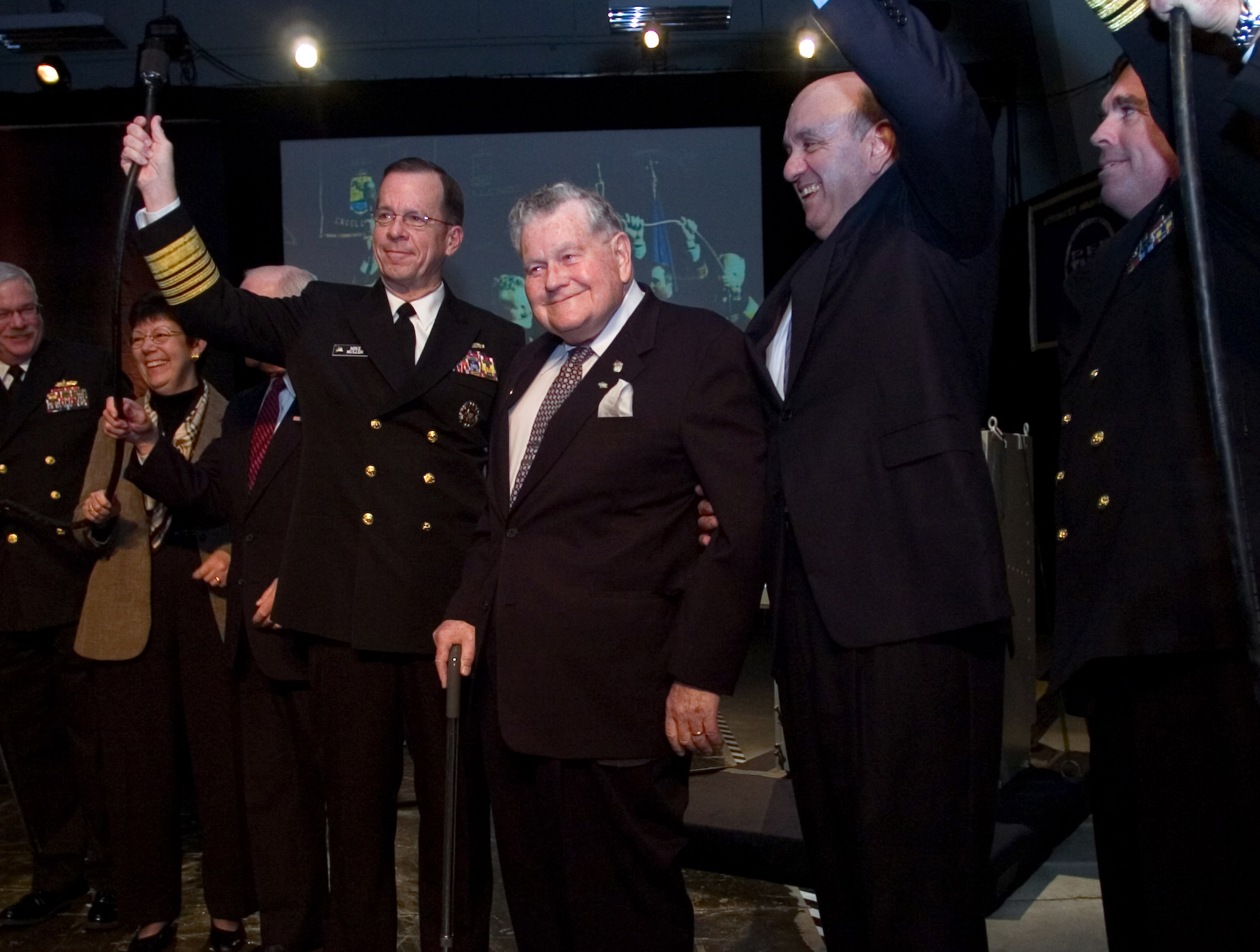
Pulling the plug to de-energize the 100th Aegis Weapons System to be delivered the Navy November 27, 2006

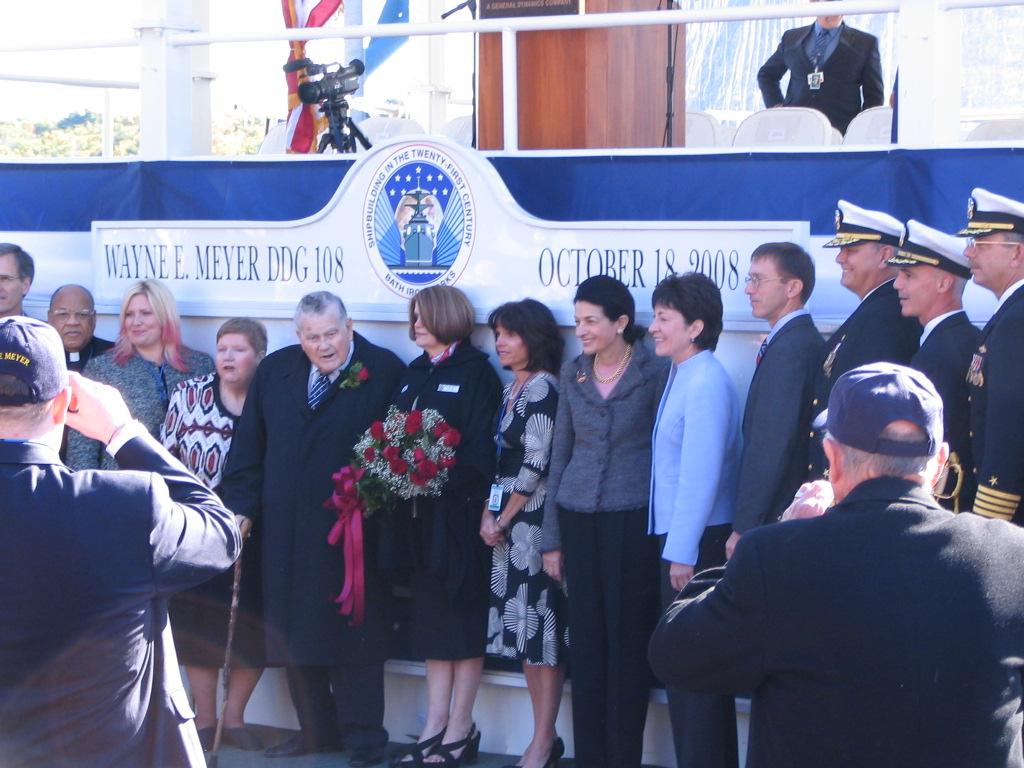
Christening party at the USS Wayne E. Meyer Christening at Bath Iron Works October 18, 2008

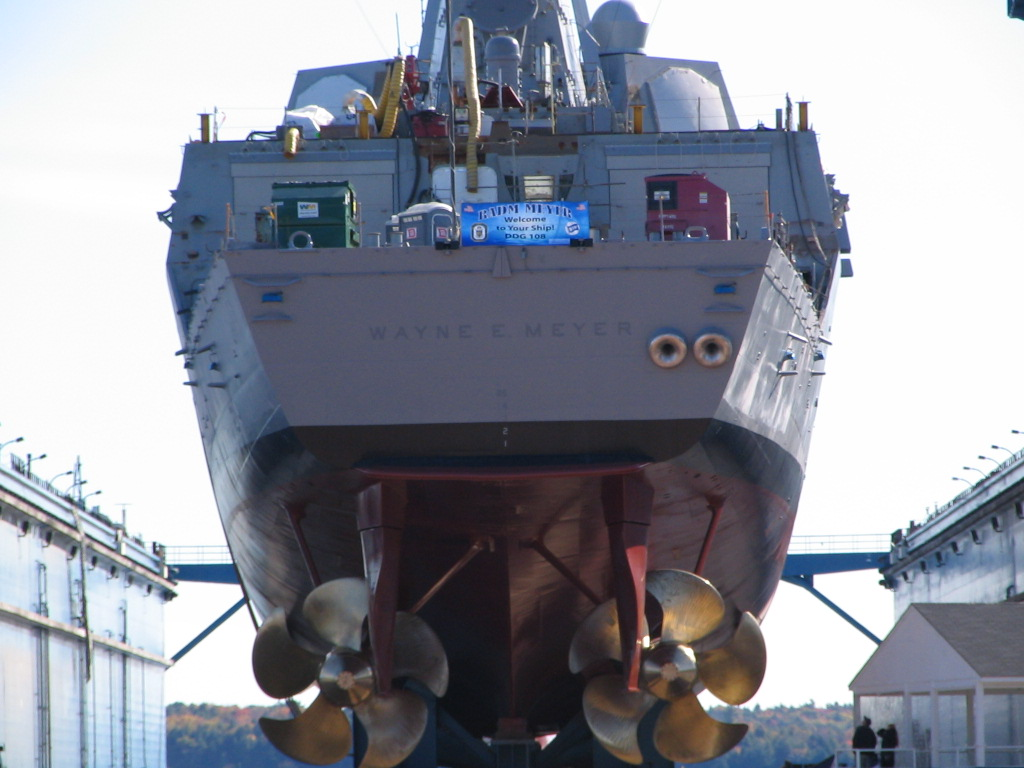
Stern view of the USS Wayne E. Meyer prior to launching October 18, 2008

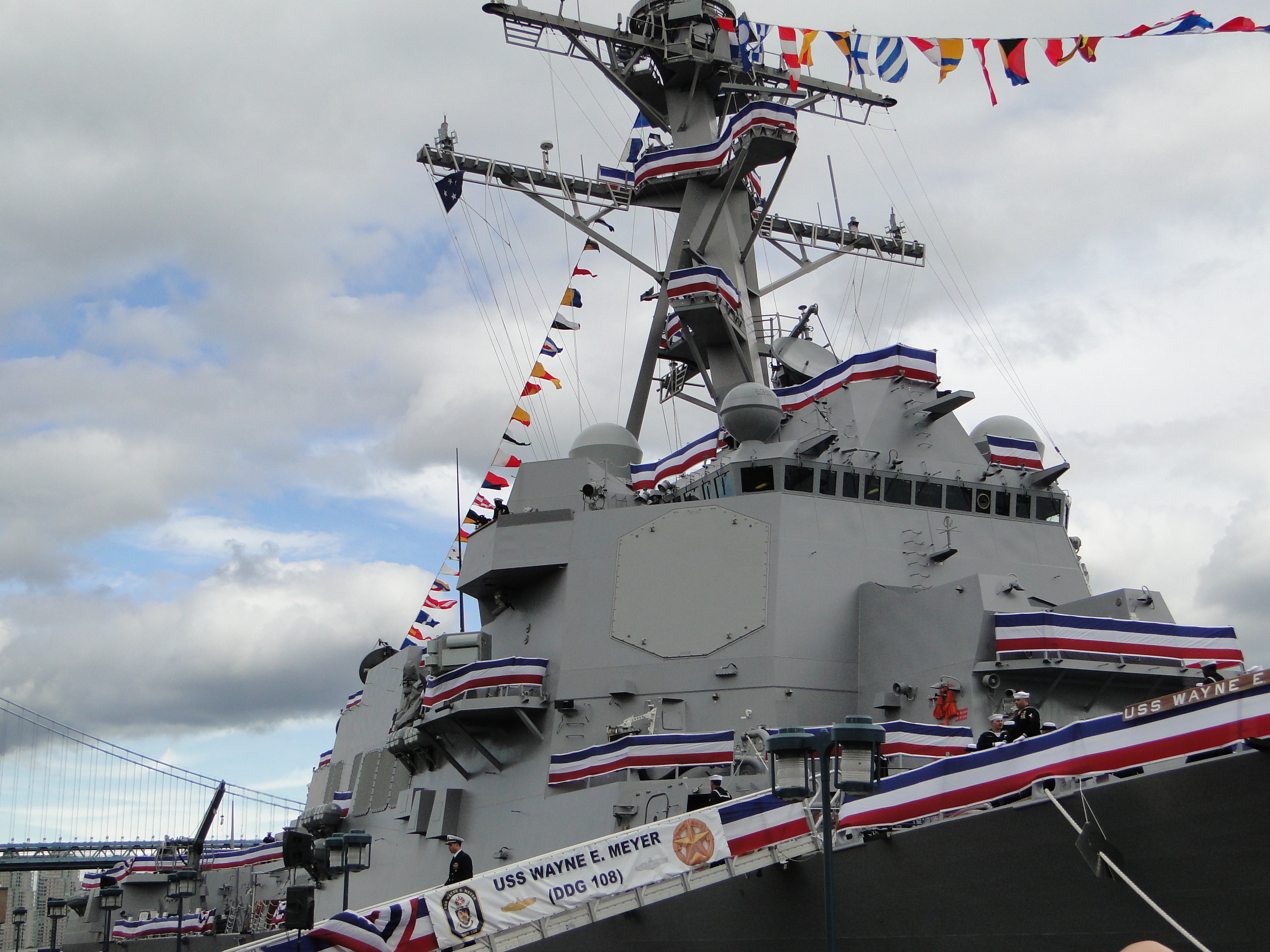
View of USS Wayne E. Meyer's superstructure at the ship's commissioning on October 10, 2009

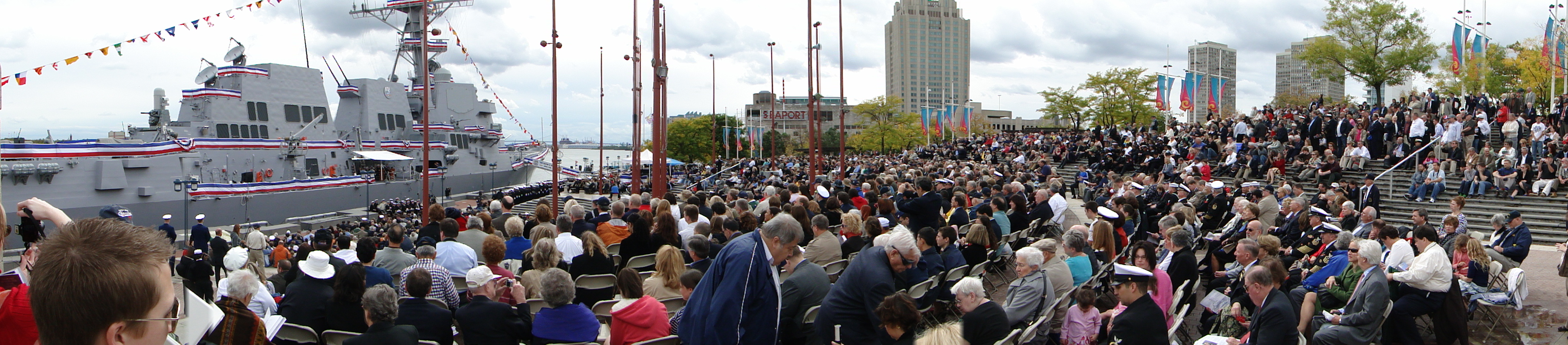
A 6,000 person crowd assembles at Penn's Landing in Philadelphia, PA on October 10, 2009, for the commissioning of the USS Wayne E. Meyer

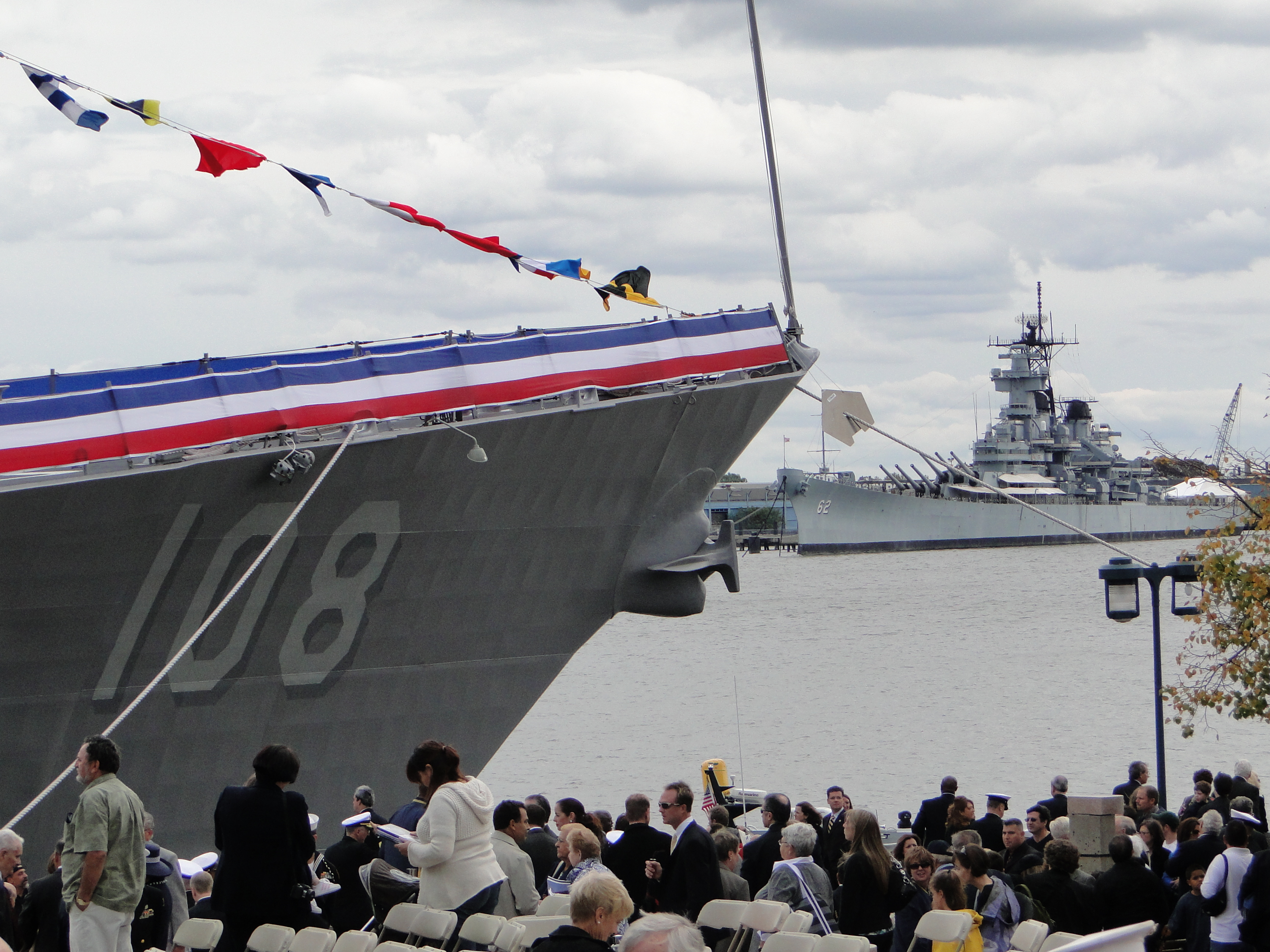
USS Wayne E. Meyer at her commissioning with the USS New Jersey in the background

== Awards and decorations ==
Rear Admiral Meyer's personal decorations and service medals include:

- Distinguished Service Medal
- Legion of Merit
- Meritorious Service Medal
- Navy Meritorious Unit Commendation ribbon with bronze star
- China Service Medal
- American Campaign Medal
- World War II Victory Medal
- Navy Occupation Service Medal
- National Defense Medal with bronze star
- Armed Forces Expeditionary Medal
- Vietnam Service Medal
- Republic of Vietnam Gallantry Cross with Palm Unit Citation
- Republic of Vietnam Civil Actions Unit Citation
- American Society of Naval Engineers Gold Medal (1976)
- Old Crow Electronics Countermeasure Association Silver Medal
- Distinguished Engineer Alumni Award, University of Kansas, 1981
- Naval Ordnance Engineer Certificate No. 99
- Fellow in the American Institute of Aeronautics and Astronautics
- Missile Systems Award for distinguished service, American Institute of Aeronautics and Astronautics, 1983
- Navy League's Rear Admiral William S. Parsons Award, 1985 for scientific and technical progress in construction of the nation's Aegis fleet
- Harold E. Saunders Award for a lifetime of contributions to Naval Engineering, American Society of Naval Engineers, 1985
- Admiral J. H. Sides Award for major contributions to Anti-Air Warfare, National Security Industrial Association, 1988
- Designated a Pioneer, Navy's Acquisition Hall of Fame in the Pentagon, 1997
- 2008 Missile Defense Agency Ronald Reagan Award
