= USS Robert E. Lee =

Submarine of the U.S. Navy

USS Robert E. Lee (SSBN-601)
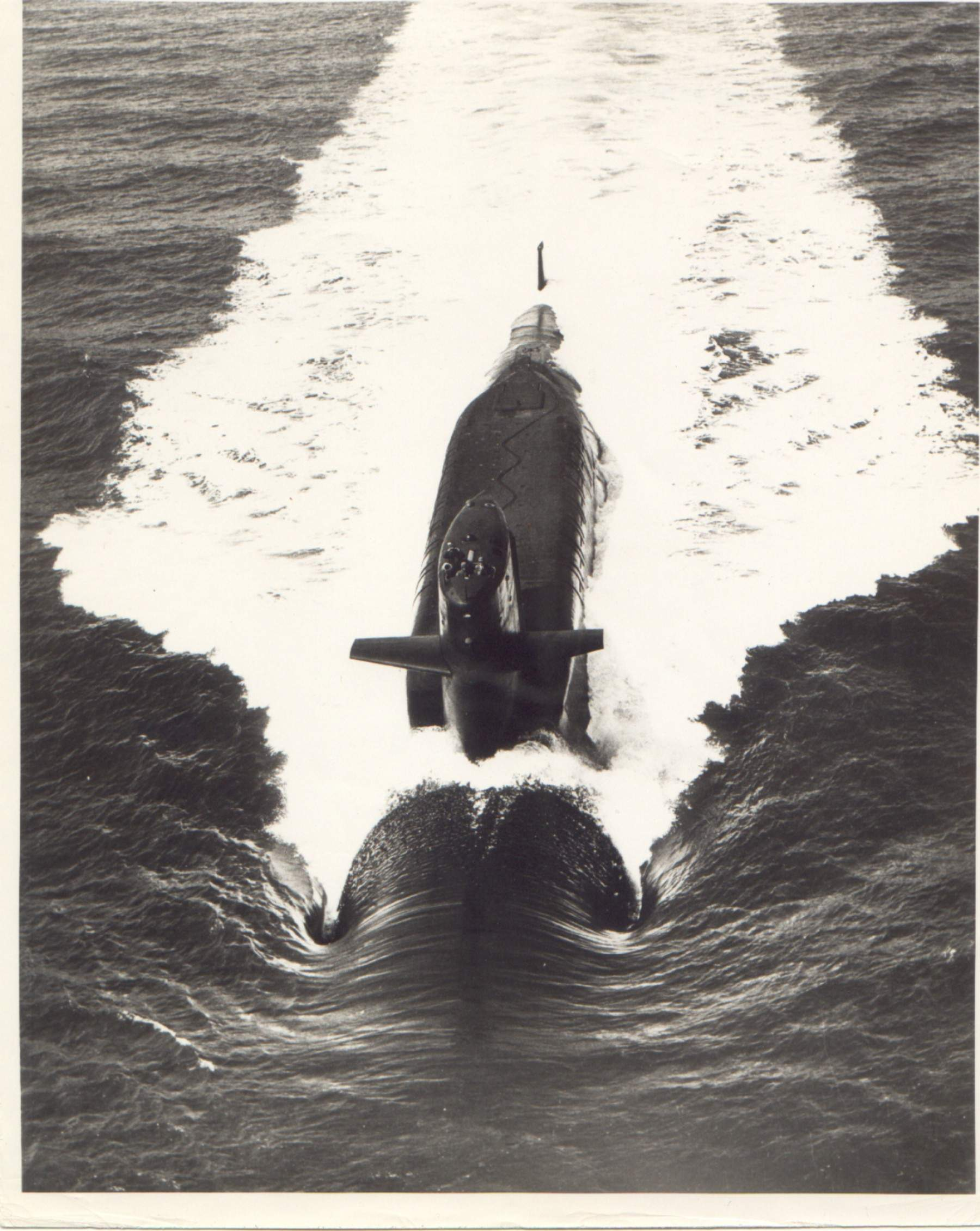
- USS Robert E. Lee (SSBN-601)

History

United States
- Namesake: Robert E. Lee (1807-1870)
- Ordered: 30 July 1958
- Builder: Newport News Shipbuilding & Dry Dock Company
- Laid down: 25 August 1958
- Launched: 18 December 1959
- Sponsored by: Mrs. Hanson E. Ely, Jr
- Commissioned: 15 September 1960
- Decommissioned: 1 December 1983
- Stricken: 30 April 1986
- Fate: Recycling via Ship-Submarine Recycling Program completed 30 September 1991

General characteristics
- Class & type: George Washington-class submarine
- Displacement: 5400 tons light; 5959-6019 tons surfaced; 6709-6888 Approx. tons submerged
- Length: 381.6 ft (116.3 m)
- Beam: 33 ft (10 m)
- Draft: 29 ft (8.8 m)
- Propulsion: 1 × S5W PWR; 2 × geared turbines at 15,000 shp (11,000 kW); 1 × shaft
- Speed: 20 knots (37 km/h; 23 mph) surfaced; 25 knots (46 km/h; 29 mph)+ submerged
- Range: unlimited except by food supplies
- Test depth: 700 ft (210 m)
- Complement: Two crews (Blue/Gold) each consisting of 12 officers 100 enlisted
- Armament: 16 × Polaris A1/A3 missiles; 6 × 21 in (530 mm) torpedo tubes

USS Robert E. Lee (SSBN-601), a George Washington-class fleet ballistic missile submarine, was the only ship of the United States Navy to be named for Robert E. Lee (1807–1870), the commanding general of the Confederate forces during the American Civil War.

Her keel was laid down on 25 August 1958 by the Newport News Shipbuilding & Dry Dock Company of Newport News, Virginia. She was launched on 18 December 1959 sponsored by Anne Carter (Lee) Ely, a granddaughter of Confederate General Robert E. Lee and widow of Hanson Edward Ely Jr., and commissioned on 16 September 1960 with Commander Reuben F. Woodal commanding the Blue Crew and Commander Joseph Williams Jr. commanding the Gold Crew.

== Service history ==
=== Shakedown and training ===
The third nuclear-powered ballistic missile submarine to join the fleet, and the first nuclear-powered submarine built in the southern United States, Robert E. Lee operated in and out of Newport News, Virginia, until 2 December 1960, when she got underway for the Narragansett Bay Operating Area for torpedo firing tests. Following the successful firing of five torpedoes on 6 December 1960, Robert E. Lee departed for Cape Canaveral, Florida, arriving on 12 December 1960. She then loaded Polaris test missiles and on 22 December 1960 conducted her first missile launch. The Polaris flew "hot and true."

In January 1961, Robert E. Lee conducted additional simulated missile launches and on 15 January 1961 departed for the Bermuda Operating Area. There, joined by the submarine USS Torsk (SS-423) on 25 January 1961, she engaged in antisubmarine warfare training with Torsk. Returning to Norfolk on 30 January, Robert E. Lee entered the Newport News drydock on 3 February for a month of shipyard work. She departed Newport News on 17 March 1961, loaded torpedoes at Yorktown, Virginia, on 25 March, and got underway for Cape Canaveral, arriving on 9 April 1961.

Robert E. Lee conducted "special operations" out of Cape Canaveral during May and June 1961, and in late June departed for Holy Loch, Scotland, where she joined Submarine Squadron 14 on 10 July 1961.

=== Holy Loch deployment, 1961–1965 ===
She conducted practice torpedo firing during the first week of August and departed Holy Loch on 9 August 1961 on her first deterrent patrol. During the next two years she completed nine more deterrent patrols.

On 10 September 1963, Robert E. Lee entered the floating drydock Los Alamos (AFDB-7), then on 4 October 1963 resumed her normal patrol schedule. Continuing to operate out of Holy Loch into 1964, she got underway on 27 November 1964 for her 16th patrol, which terminated on 28 January 1965 at Mare Island Naval Shipyard, Vallejo, California.

=== First refit, 1965 ===
On 22 February 1965, Robert E. Lee entered the Mare Island Division of the San Francisco Bay Naval Shipyard for her first overhaul. Major items of work included refueling the reactor, reengineering of many ship systems to provide greater safety and reliability, modernization of the navigation system, and modification to the weapons system to give her the capability of launching the improved Polaris A3 missile.

Emerging from overhaul after nearly a year and a half of work, Robert E. Lee got underway for sea trials on 12 July 1966. Sound trials and weapons system accuracy trials were conducted during the latter half of July, and on 5 August she entered San Diego, California, harbor for a five-day visit. Underway for the United States East Coast on 10 August 1966, Robert E. Lee transited the Panama Canal on 20 August and arrived at Charleston, South Carolina, on 4 September 1966.

During the remainder of September and the first week of October, Robert E. Lee conducted shakedown operations off Cape Canaveral, Florida. On 10 October, with the Undersecretary of the Navy on board as an observer, Robert E. Lee successfully fired a Polaris A-3 test missile. She returned to Charleston to commence a predeployment upkeep period at the Cooper River site in South Carolina where a failed rudder ram bolt was replaced. On 4 December 1966, she departed Charleston on her 17th deterrent patrol, which terminated at Holy Loch on 30 January 1967.

=== Holy Loch, 1967–1971 ===
By 4 October 1967, Robert E. Lee had completed three more patrols. After drydocking in Los Alamos for minor repairs and hull surveillance, she resumed her patrol schedule on 1 November 1967 and completed her 21st patrol before entering drydock on 22 November 1967 for two weeks of repairs. She departed Holy Loch on 26 December 1967 for another patrol.

Robert E. Lee remained attached to Submarine Squadron 14 throughout 1969 and 1970. Continuing to operate out of Holy Loch, she completed her 33rd deterrent patrol on 1 January 1971.

=== Second refit (1971) ===
Robert E. Lee was drydocked for her second overhaul on 27 January 1971 at Puget Sound Naval Shipyard, Bremerton, Washington. She did not leave the drydock until 11 December 1971 and, afterward remained berthed at Puget Sound Naval Shipyard for the remainder of 1971. For the first seven months of 1972, Robert E. Lee was engaged in post-overhaul trials and exercises on the west coast of the United States.

=== United States East Coast operations, 1972–1973 ===
In mid-August 1972, Robert E. Lee transited the Panama Canal and arrived in Charleston, South Carolina, on 14 September 1972. She continued normal operations, this time on the U.S. East Coast, throughout 1972 and for the first seven months of 1973.

=== Pacific operations, 1973–1977 ===
Transiting the Panama Canal early in August 1973, she arrived in San Diego, California, on 17 August 1973 and then moved on to Pearl Harbor, Hawaii, arriving on 5 September 1973. After a month in Hawaii, she sailed for Apra, Guam, and continued operations in that area into 1977, accomplishing several deterrent patrols in the Pacific.

=== Third refit, 1977–1978 ===
In early 1977, Robert E. Lee drydocked for her third and final overhaul at Mare Island Naval Shipyard for nuclear reactor core refueling, equipment, and weapons upgrades. Sea Trials commenced in August 1978 and she went into operational status December 1978.

=== Operations 1978–1983 ===
The Gold Crew transited the Panama Canal January 1979. Transited to San Diego California, Bremerton, WA to Honolulu, HI. Turned over to the Blue Crew. In 1982–1983, Robert E. Lee's missiles were removed and she was redesignated SSN 601.

== Decommissioning and disposal ==
Robert E. Lee was decommissioned on 1 December 1983, and stricken from the Naval Vessel Register on 30 April 1986. Her hulk was stored at Puget Sound Naval Shipyard until it entered the Nuclear Powered Ship and Submarine Recycling Program. On 30 September 1991, it ceased to exist.
