= Cybernetics—in the Service of Communism =

Cybernetics—in the Service of Communism was the title of a symposium and accompanying publication sponsored by Aksel Berg, a prominent promoter of cybernetics in the Soviet Union. He provided an eponymous introduction noted for its length and programmatic nature. The symposium was held in 1961, prior to the 22nd Congress of the Communist Party of the Soviet Union, where cybernetics was declared one of the "major tools of the creation of a communist society".

== The response from the USA ==
An American organizational theorist, Donald G. Malcolm, remarked: “If any country were to achieve a completely integrated and controlled economy in which ‘cybernetic’ principles were applied to achieve various goals, the Soviet Union would be ahead of the United States in reaching such a state”. He also suggested that cybernetics “may be one of the weapons Khrushchev had in mind when he threatened to ‘bury’ the West”. As a result of such concerns the Central Intelligence Agency established a special unit to study the Soviet cybernetics.

== Bibliography ==
- Peters, Benjamin (2012). "Normalizing Soviet Cybernetics". Information & Culture. 47 (2): 145–175. doi:10.1353/lac.2012.0009. JSTOR 43737425. S2CID 144363003.
