= USS Wayne E. Meyer =

Guided missile destroyer of the United States Navy

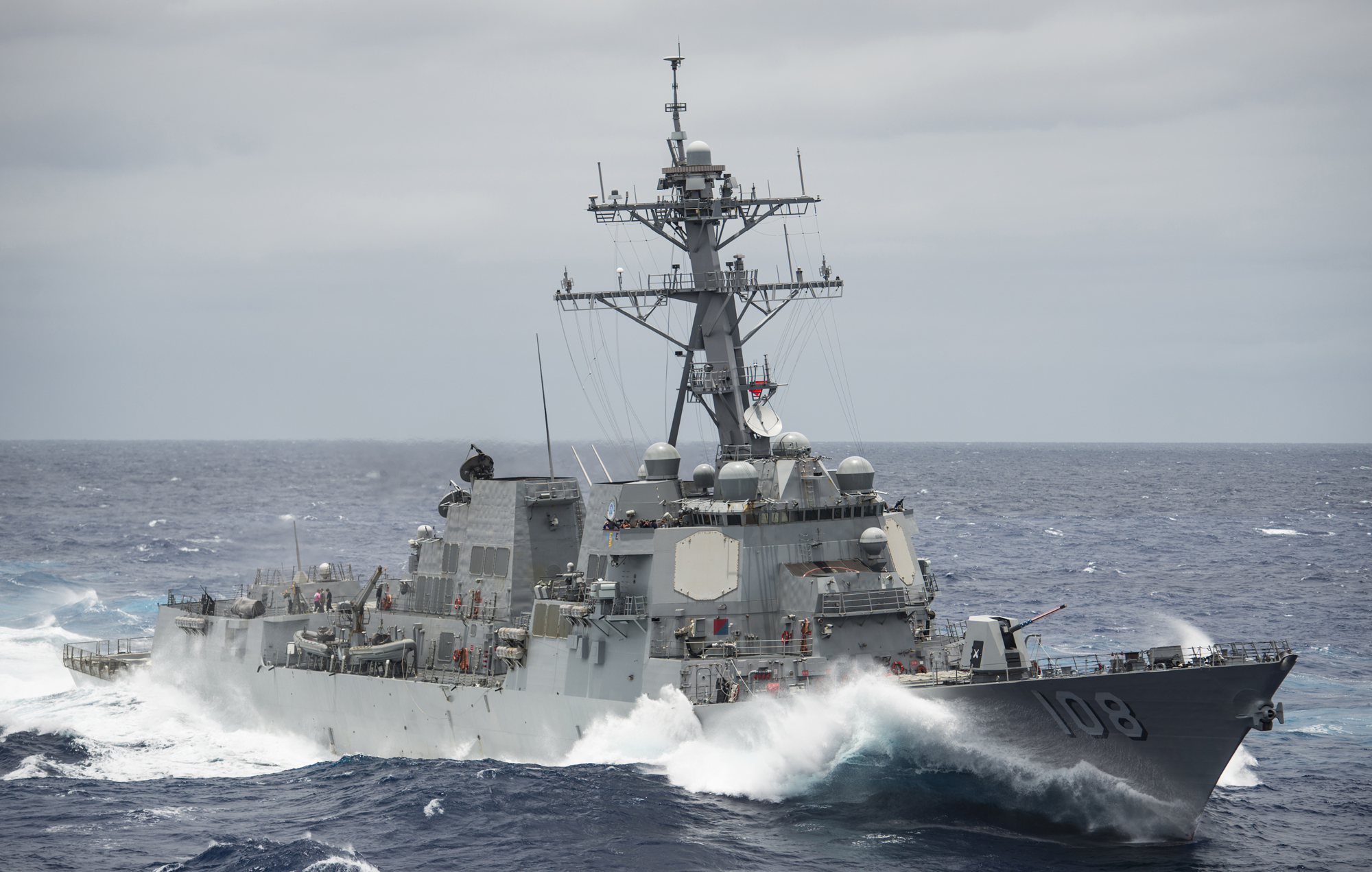
- USS Wayne E. Meyer on 19 June 2017

History

United States
- Name: Wayne E. Meyer
- Namesake: Wayne E. Meyer
- Awarded: 13 September 2002
- Builder: Bath Iron Works
- Laid down: 17 May 2007
- Launched: 19 October 2008
- Sponsored by: Anna Mae Meyer
- Acquired: 10 July 2009
- Commissioned: 10 October 2009
- Home port: Pearl Harbor
- Identification: MMSI number: 369970036; Callsign: NFOA; Pennant number: DDG-108
- Motto: One Powerful Legacy
- Honors and awards: See Awards
- Status: in active service
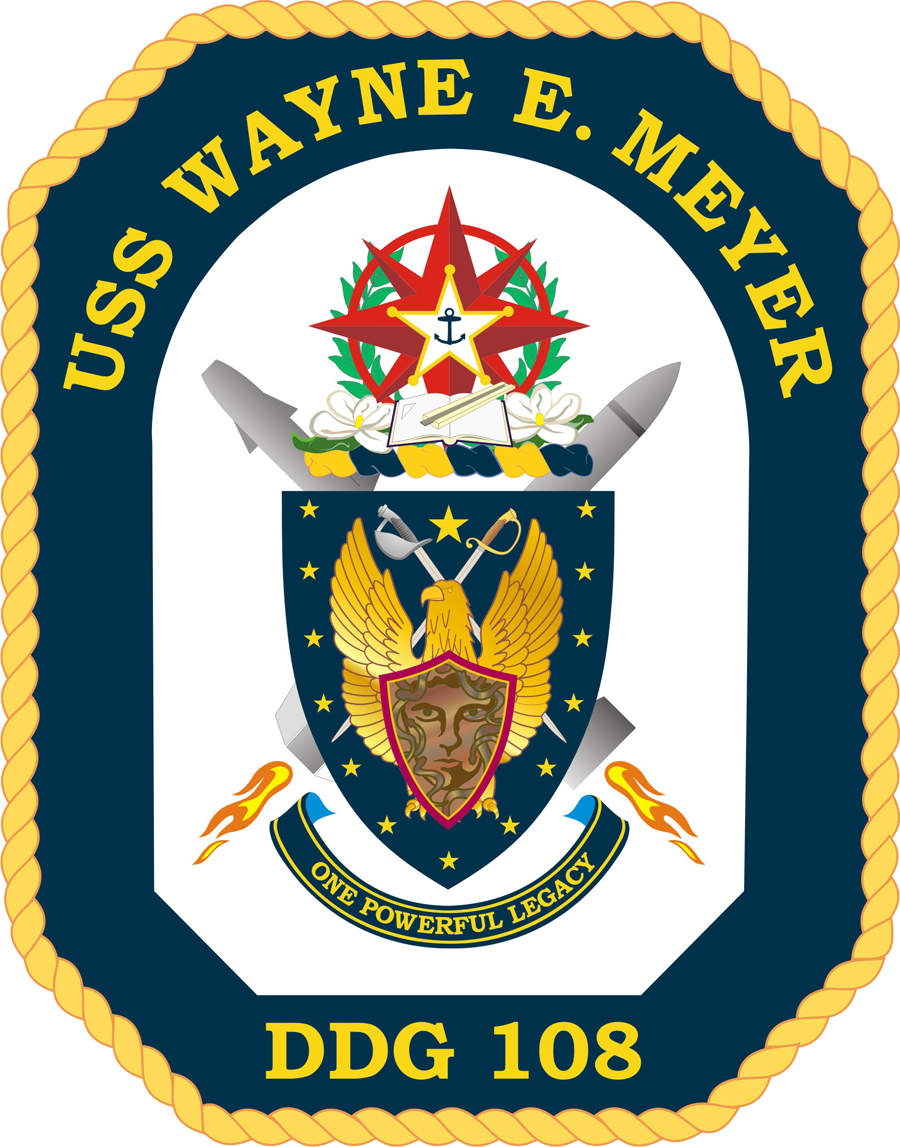
- Badge

General characteristics
- Class & type: Arleigh Burke-class destroyer
- Displacement: 9,200 tons
- Length: 509 ft 6 in (155.30 m)
- Beam: 66 ft (20 m)
- Draft: 31 ft (9.4 m)
- Propulsion: 4 × General Electric LM2500-30 gas turbines, 2 shafts, 100,000 shp (75 MW)
- Speed: exceeds 30 knots (56 km/h; 35 mph)
- Complement: 312 officers and enlisted
- Armament: Guns: 1 × 5-inch (127 mm)/62 Mk 45 Mod 4 (lightweight gun); 1 × 20 mm (0.8 in) Phalanx CIWS; 2 × 25 mm (0.98 in) Mk 38 machine gun system; 4 × 0.50 in (12.7 mm) caliber guns; Missiles: 1 × 32-cell, 1 × 64-cell (96 total cells) Mk 41 vertical launching system (VLS): RIM-66M surface-to-air missile; RIM-156 surface-to-air missile; RIM-174A Standard ERAM; RIM-161 anti-ballistic missile; RIM-162 ESSM (quad-packed); BGM-109 Tomahawk cruise missile; RUM-139 vertical launch ASROC; Torpedoes: 2 × Mark 32 triple torpedo tubes: Mark 46 lightweight torpedo; Mark 50 lightweight torpedo; Mark 54 lightweight torpedo
- Aircraft carried: 2 × MH-60R Seahawk helicopters

USS Wayne E. Meyer (DDG-108) is an Arleigh Burke-class (Flight IIA) Aegis guided missile destroyer in the United States Navy. She is named after Rear Admiral Wayne E. Meyer, known as the "Father of Aegis". She carries the 100th AEGIS Weapon System to be delivered to the United States Navy.

== Construction ==
Wayne E. Meyer is the 58th destroyer in her class. She was built by Bath Iron Works, and was christened by sponsor Anna Mae Meyer, wife of Admiral Meyer, and launched on 18 October 2008. She completed sea trials in June 2009, and was delivered to the Navy in July 2009. She was commissioned on the Delaware River, in Philadelphia, Pennsylvania, on 10 October 2009.

== Ship history ==
Wayne E. Meyer arrived at her homeport in San Diego, California, on 4 December 2009.

Wayne E. Meyer made her maiden deployment as part of the John C. Stennis Carrier Strike Group (CSG) from 29 July 2011 until 27 February 2012. She made port calls in Malaysia, Japan, South Korea, Thailand, Bahrain, Dubai, and the Philippines.

In January 2017, Wayne E. Meyer, and her sister ship Michael Murphy, were part of Destroyer Squadron 1, and along with Lake Champlain and Carl Vinson formed Carrier Strike Group One (CSG-1), during a deployment to the western Pacific. In April of that year, CSG-1 cancelled a scheduled port call in Australia, in response to increasing tensions between the United States and North Korea over the latter's nuclear weapons program.

In September 2018 Wayne E. Meyer and O'Kane completed homeport swaps. Wayne E. Meyer arrived at Joint Base Pearl Harbor–Hickam on 13 September, and O'Kane got underway for her new homeport of San Diego.

== In popular culture ==
- Wayne E. Meyer was featured in the episode "Destroyer Disaster" of the Food Network show, Dinner: Impossible.
- Wayne E. Meyer was used in the filming of Season 2 Episode 5, "Achilles", of the TNT Network show The Last Ship.

== Awards ==
- Navy Unit Commendation - (Sep 2011–Jan 2012, Jul 2012–May 2013)
- Navy E Ribbon - (2013, 2014)
- Spokane Trophy - (2014)
- Secretary of the Navy (SECNAV) Energy Conservation Award (Medium ship category) - (2017)
- Captain Edward F. Ney Memorial Award - (2024)
