= United States Navy Special Projects Office =

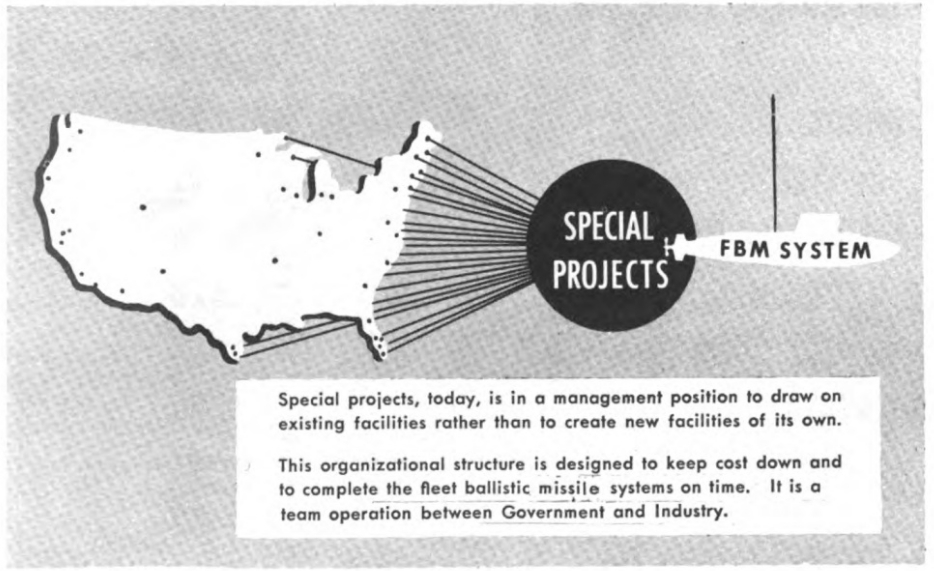
United States Navy Special Projects Office, 1963

United States Navy Special Projects Office (SPO) is a former research and design office of the United States Navy, responsible for the coordination of the development and design of the US Navy Fleet Ballistic Missiles (FBM) Polaris and Poseidon.

The Special Projects Office was initiated in 1956 as new organization with a mandate to develop a submarine-launched solid-fuel fleet ballistic missile. The Special Projects Office reported directly to Admiral Arleigh Burke, and the secretary of the Navy, an unprecedented bypass of the Navy bureaus that signalled the Navy's commitment to the FBM concept.

To direct the Special Projects Office, at John H. Sides' persistent suggestion, Burke selected Sides' former deputy, Rear Admiral William F. Raborn, Jr., whose phenomenal success in that role would earn him renown as the father of Polaris.

The Special Projects Office (SPO) is also known for the development of the planning and scheduling methodology, known as Program Evaluation and Review Technique or just PERT, and first published in 1958.

== History ==
=== Origins ===
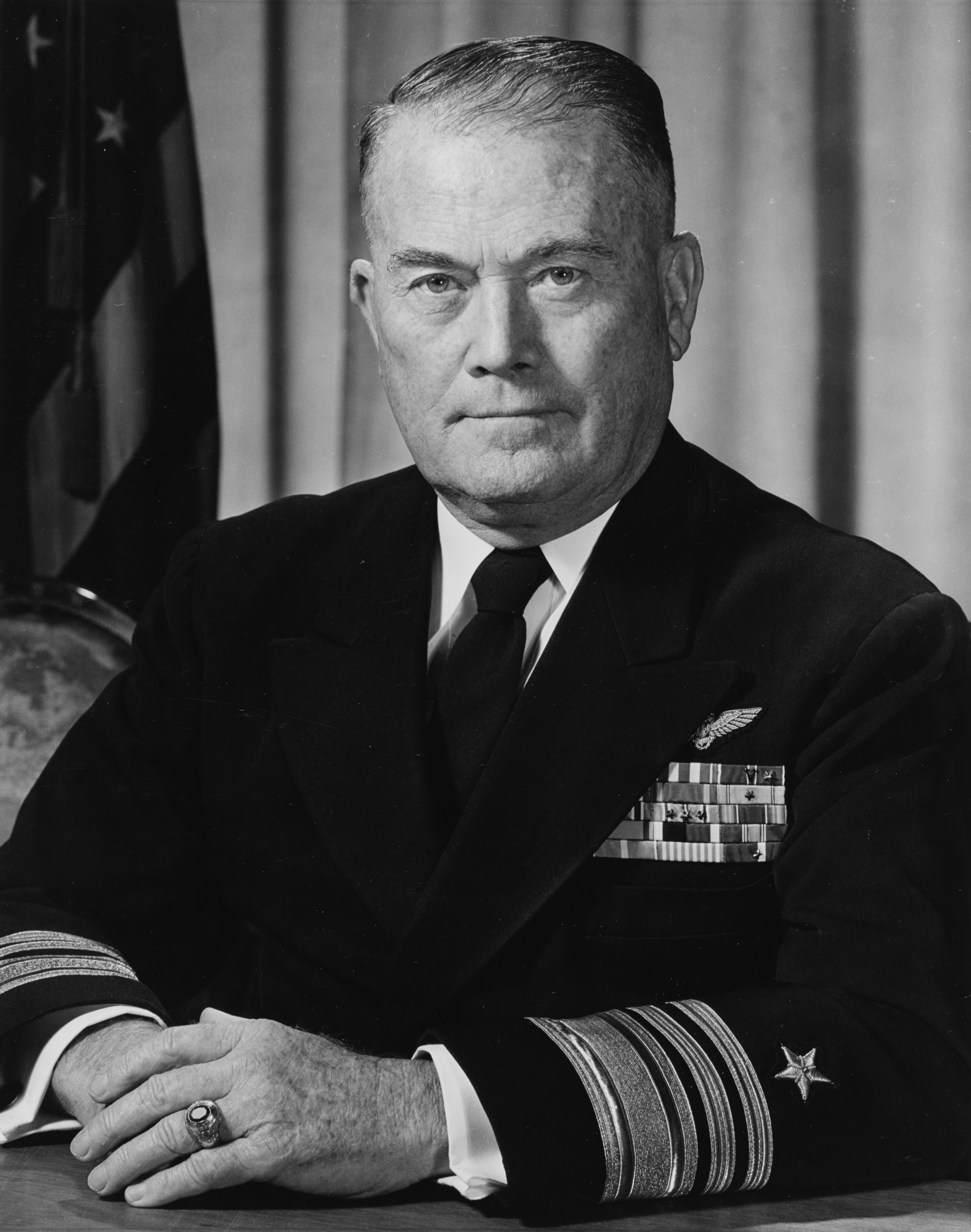
Adm. William Raborn, head of the Special Projects Office.

On September 13, 1955, President Dwight D. Eisenhower directed the Navy to design a ship-launched Fleet Ballistic Missile (FBM) similar to the Army's Jupiter IRBM. John H. Sides, director of the guided-missile division in the office of the chief of naval operations, and the Navy protested that liquid-fuel rockets like Jupiter were too dangerous for shipboard use and pushed instead for submarine-launched solid-fuel rockets for tactical use against enemy submarine bases. However, on November 17, 1955, Secretary of Defense Charles E. Wilson ordered the Navy to join the Army on Jupiter development, and specified that all such missile development would not be externally funded but would have to be carved out of the existing Navy budget.

Despite strong support from the Chief of Naval Operations (CNO) Admiral Arleigh Burke, the program ballistic missile system for the fleet did not develop well, also due to the resistance of the bureaucracy in the Navy. Desiring to strengthen the status of the program and accelerate the development of its own missile, the Admiral created the Special Projects Office (SPO), independent of other technical offices, whose sole task was to support the work on the marine ballistic missile.

At the head of the Special Projects Office was appointed Admiral William Raborn, a former Navy pilot, chosen by Burke due to his personal qualities and belief in the military, rather than his vision on the technical run of the program. In these endeavors, Admiral Burke had strong support from the Secretary of the Navy Charles Thomas.

=== Research challenges ===
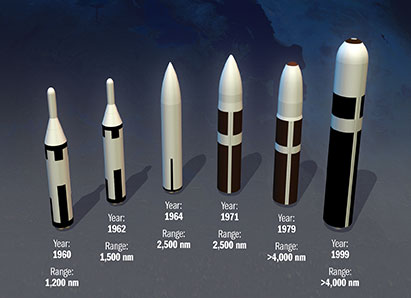
Weapons of the Fleet Ballistic Missile Submarine Fleet (left to right): Polaris A1 (1960), Polaris A2 (1962), Polaris A3 (1964), and later missiles Poseidon (1971), Trident I (1979) and Trident II (1999).

Work on the marine version of the Jupiter missile gained momentum in 1956, while the year 1959 was sets as the date of dispatch for the first modified missiles on board commercial vessels at sea. For the naval version of the missile, a drive based on solid fuel was considered. Some studies had shown that this could be used in nuclear-powered submarines with ballistic missiles up to 8,300 tonnes.

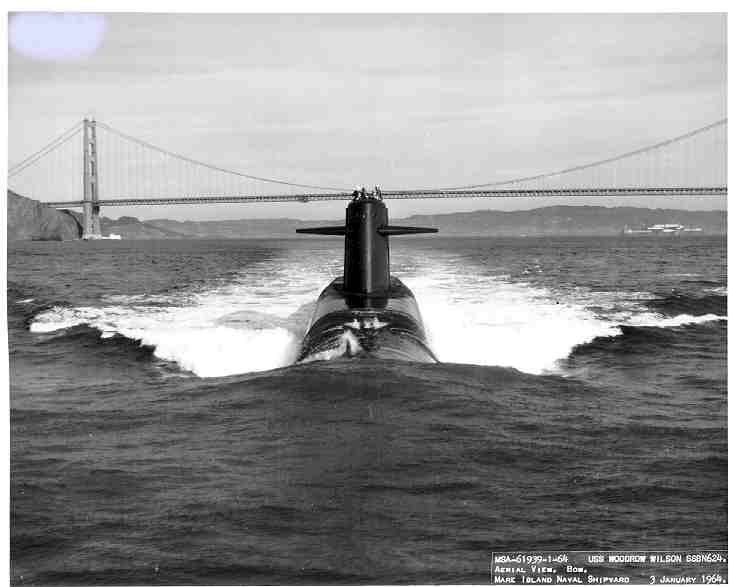
USS Woodrow Wilson submarine

During the program, the US Navy had doubts about the application of liquid fuel missiles on board, so it initiated studies on the possibility of the use of drives on solid fuel, which, however, limited the ability to transfer cargo. A breakthrough in this area occurred in 1956, when scientists discovered a way to significantly reduce the size of thermonuclear warheads.

Father of the American hydrogen bomb - Dr. Edward Teller had stated in the summer of 1956, that soon heads weighing 400 pounds (181 kg) will have the power of a bomb explosion 5000-pound (2270 kg). In September that year, the US Atomic Energy Agency estimated, that such a small nuclear warhead would be available in 1965, with some chance of making it back in 1963. The development of this specific program coincided with the intensive work on the high thrust drive on solid fuels.

These developments made admiral Raborn decide, August 1956, to initiated a joined program with the US Navy and US Army. It was connected with the formal initiation of the small solid-fuel missile, which has been accepted by the Secretary of Defense in December 1956.

=== Program Evaluation and Review Technique PERT ===
Program Evaluation and Review Technique PERT was developed for the U.S. Navy Special Projects Office in 1957 to support the U.S. Navy's Polaris nuclear submarine project. PERT was developed primarily to simplify the planning and scheduling of large and complex projects, and has found applications all over industry.

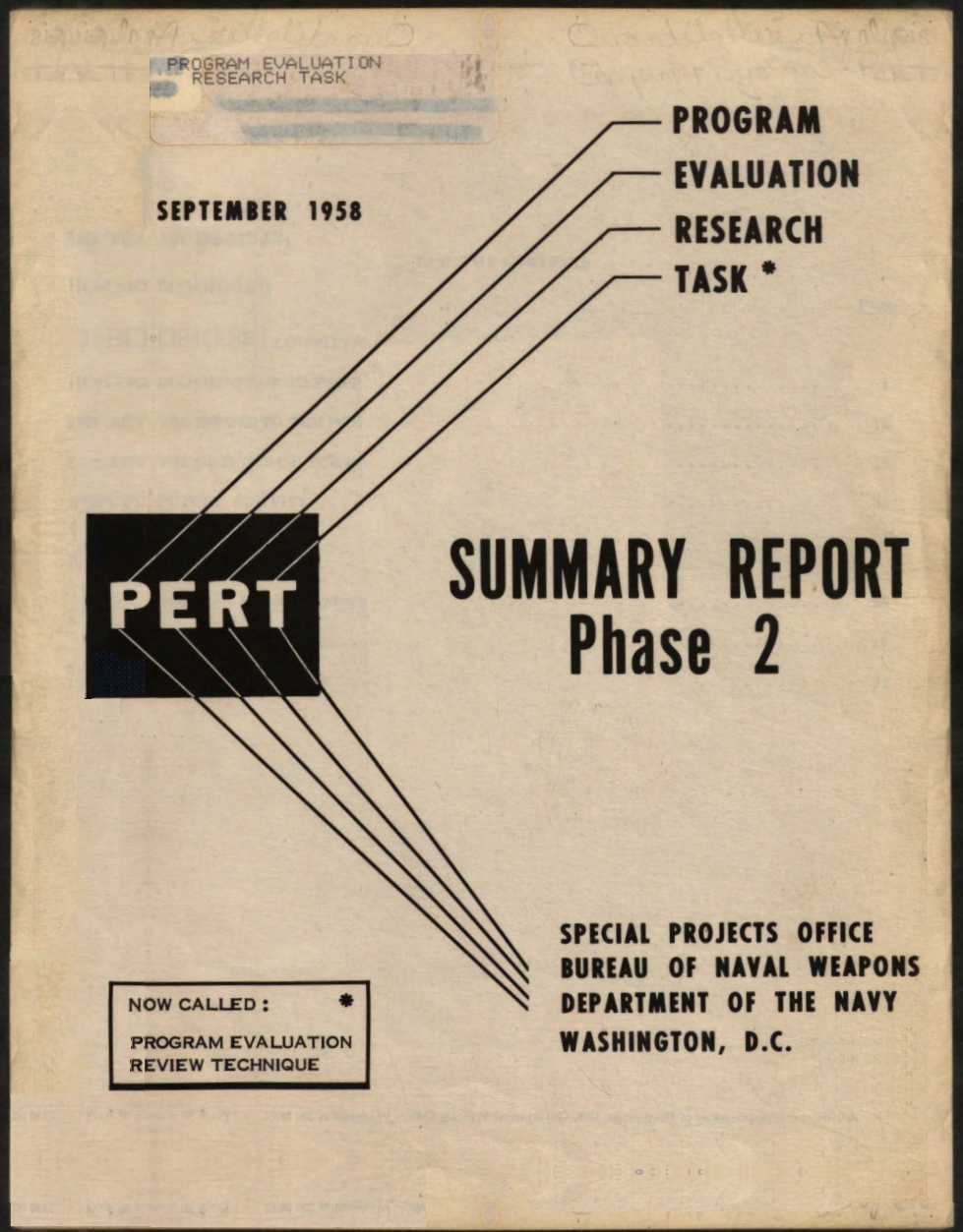
PERT Summary Report Phase 2, 1958

PERT had been made public in 1958 in two publications of the U.S. Department of the Navy, entitled Program Evaluation Research Task, Summary Report, Phase 1. and Program Evaluation Research Task, Summary Report, Phase 2. In a 1959 article in The American Statistician Willard Fazar, Head of the Program Evaluation Branch, Special Projects Office, U.S. Navy, gave a detailed description of the development, that led to the Program Evaluation and Review Technique. He explained:

The Navy's Special Projects Office, charged with developing the Polaris-Submarine weapon system and the Fleet Ballistic Missile capability, has developed a statistical technique for measuring and forecasting progress in research and development programs. This program evaluation and review technique (code-named PERT) is applied as a decision-making tool designed to save time in achieving end-objectives, and is of particular interest to those engaged in research and development programs for which time is a critical factor.
The new technique takes recognition of three factors that influence successful achievement of research and development program objectives: time, resources, and technical performance specifications. PERT employs time as the variable that reflects planned resource-applications and performance specifications. With units of time as a common denominator, PERT quantifies knowledge about the uncertainties involved in developmental programs requiring effort at the edge of, or beyond, current knowledge of the subject — effort for which little or no previous experience exists.

For the subdivision of work units in PERT another tool was developed: the Work Breakdown Structure. The Work Breakdown Structure provides "a framework for complete networking, the Work Breakdown Structure was formally introduced as the first item of analysis in carrying out basic PERT/COST."

=== Renamed the Strategic Systems Project Office ===
Due to changing interests in the naval programs, in 1968, the Special Projects Office was renamed the Strategic Systems Project Office and its tasks had been extended.

== Selected publications ==
- U.S. Dept. of the Navy. Program Evaluation Research Task, Summary Report, Phase 1. Washington, D.C., Government Printing Office, 1958.
- U.S. Dept. of the Navy. Program Evaluation Research Task, Summary Report, Phase 2. Washington, D.C., Government Printing Office, 1958.
- United States. Polaris management, Fleet ballistic missile program. Washington, D.C. : U.S. Govt. Print. Off., 1962.

== Bibliography ==
- Norman Polmar. Cold War Submarines, The Design and Construction of US and Soviet Submarines. More KJ. Potomac Books, Inc., 2003. ISBN 1-57488-530-8.
- Graham Spinardi. From Polaris Trident: the development of US Fleet ballistic missile technology. Cambridge [England]: Cambridge University Press, 1994. ISBN 0-521-41357-5.
- Norman Friedman, James L. Christley. US Submarines Since 1945: An Illustrated Design History. Naval Institute Press. ISBN 1-55750-260-9.
