= William Raborn =

United States Navy admiral

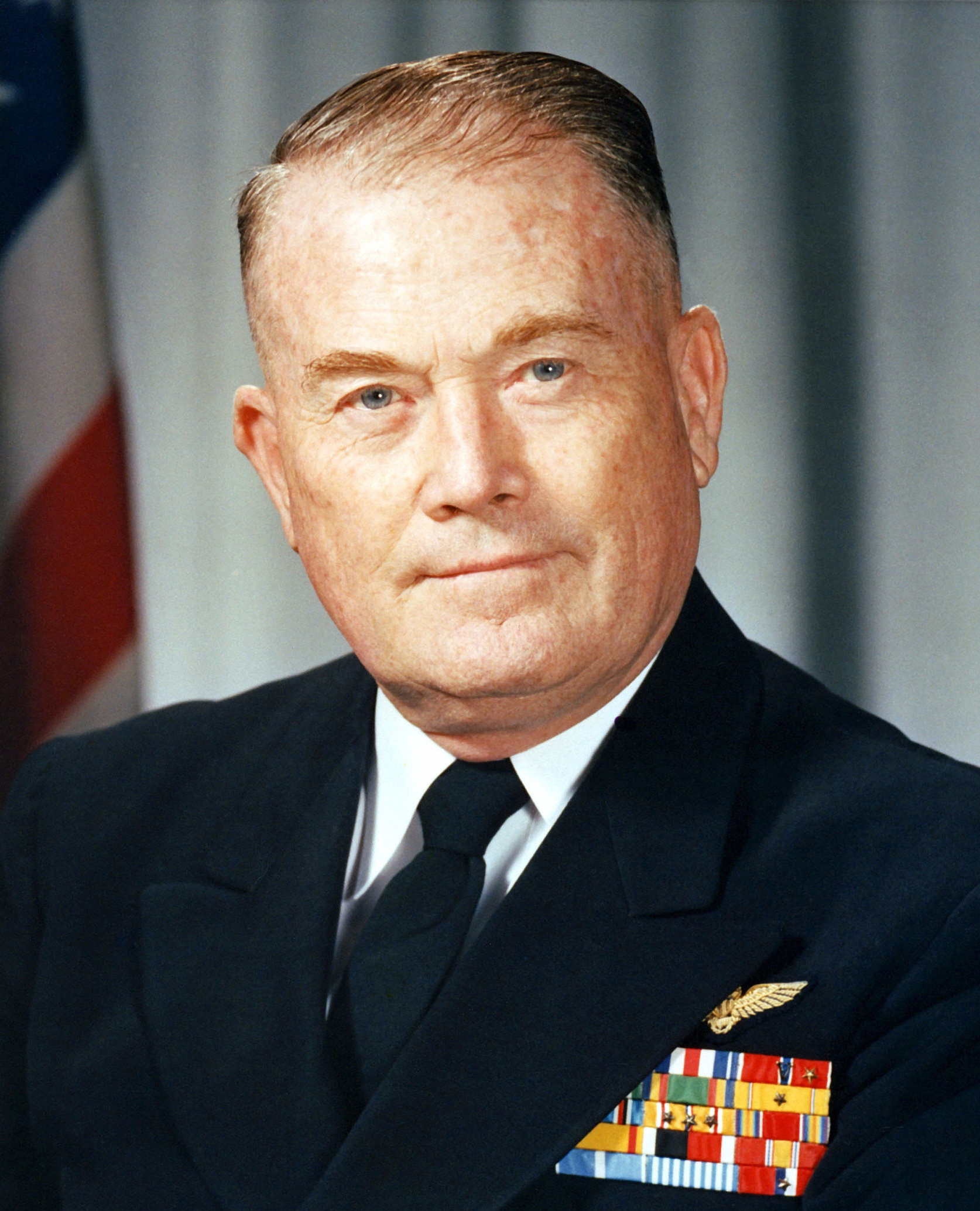

7th Director of Central Intelligence
- In office April 28, 1965 – June 30, 1966
- President: Lyndon B. Johnson
- Deputy: Richard Helms
- Preceded by: John McCone
- Succeeded by: Richard Helms

Personal details
- Born: William Francis Raborn, Jr. June 8, 1905 Decatur, Texas, U.S.
- Died: March 6, 1990 (aged 84) McLean, Virginia, U.S.
- Education: United States Naval Academy (BS)

Military service
- Allegiance: United States
- Branch/service: United States Navy
- Years of service: 1928–1963
- Rank: Vice Admiral
- Commands: USS Bairoko; USS Bennington
- Battles/wars: World War II
- Awards: Navy Distinguished Service Medal; Silver Star

William Francis Raborn, Jr., (June 8, 1905 – March 6, 1990) was the United States Director of Central Intelligence from April 28, 1965 until June 30, 1966. He was also a career United States Navy officer who led the project to develop the Polaris missile system and retired from the navy in 1963 as a vice admiral.

== Early life and naval career ==
Born in Decatur, Texas, he graduated from the U.S. Naval Academy in 1928. During World War II he directed the Gunnery Training Section at the Bureau of Aeronautics. He also served in the Pacific on aircraft carriers: Raborn was the executive officer of the carrier USS Hancock (CV-19) when her deck was damaged by a kamikaze attack. He had the deck repaired in four hours, allowing the ship's aircraft (which had been airborne when the kamikaze struck) to land safely – for this Raborn was awarded the Silver Star. He later commanded the carriers USS Bairoko (CVE-115) and USS Bennington (CV-20).

Raborn was a rear admiral when he was appointed, on November 8, 1955, as director of special projects at the Bureau of Weapons. His task was to develop a submarine-launched ballistic missile. He reported directly to Chief of Naval Operations Admiral Arleigh Burke and the Secretary of the Navy Charles Thomas. Raborn was told the new system had to achieve interim capability by early 1963 and full capability by early 1965. The USS George Washington (SSBN-598), the first ballistic missile submarine, was commissioned December 30, 1959, fired its first test missile July 20, 1960, and departed on the navy's first deterrent patrol on November 15, 1960. Raborn received the Distinguished Service Medal and was appointed Vice Admiral in 1960. The same year he was awarded the Collier Trophy for his work on Polaris.

Raborn had delivered Polaris three years ahead of schedule, due in part to his application of the PERT methodology. He became Deputy Chief of Naval Operations for Development in 1962. Raborn retired from the navy in 1965 and on April 28 of that year, despite his having no intelligence experience, President Lyndon B. Johnson appointed Raborn as the seventh director of Central Intelligence (DCI). As DCI, one of his primary responsibilities was to direct the Central Intelligence Agency.

Time magazine wrote that his organizational skills would be invaluable in a CIA that admitted it was in danger of being "drowned in data", but his tenure was not successful: author David Barrett described Raborn as "incompetent at CIA, not understanding the agency or the intelligence business", and even the CIA's own historians said "Raborn did not 'take' to the DCI job". A later CIA director, William Colby, described Raborn as focused on intelligence technology and not sufficiently attuned to the cultural issues involved in dealing with foreign nationals and governments.

Raborn resigned on June 30, 1966, having served for only fourteen months as DCI. He was replaced by his deputy, Richard Helms.

He was involved, during his time at the CIA, in its early activities against Ramparts magazine and its editors.

Raborn is buried in the United States Naval Academy Cemetery in Annapolis, Maryland. He died in McLean Virginia on March 6, 1990 of complications from a heart attack at age 84.

== Awards ==

1st Row	Navy Distinguished Service Medal	Silver Star	Bronze Star Medal w/Combat "V" Valor device & w/1 award star
2nd row	Navy and Marine Corps Commendation Medal	Navy Unit Commendation	American Defense Service Medal w/1 service star
3rd row	American Campaign Medal	Asiatic-Pacific Campaign Medal w/3 service stars	World War II Victory Medal
4th row	Navy Occupation Service Medal	China Service Medal	National Defense Service Medal w/1 service star
5th row	Korean Service Medal	United Nations Service Medal Korea	Philippines Liberation Medal w/1 service star

Raborn was also:

- Vice admiral (United States Navy)
- Director, U.S. Navy Special Projects Office
- Deputy Chief of Naval Operations
- 32° Mason (Ancient & Accepted Scottish Rite Of Freemasonry)

== Other honors and recognition ==
In 1962, Raborn received the Golden Plate Award of the American Academy of Achievement.

Government offices
Preceded by John McCone	Director of Central Intelligence; 1965–1966	Succeeded by Richard Helms
