= Fulton-class submarine tender =

Class of United States Navy submarine tender

Fulton class
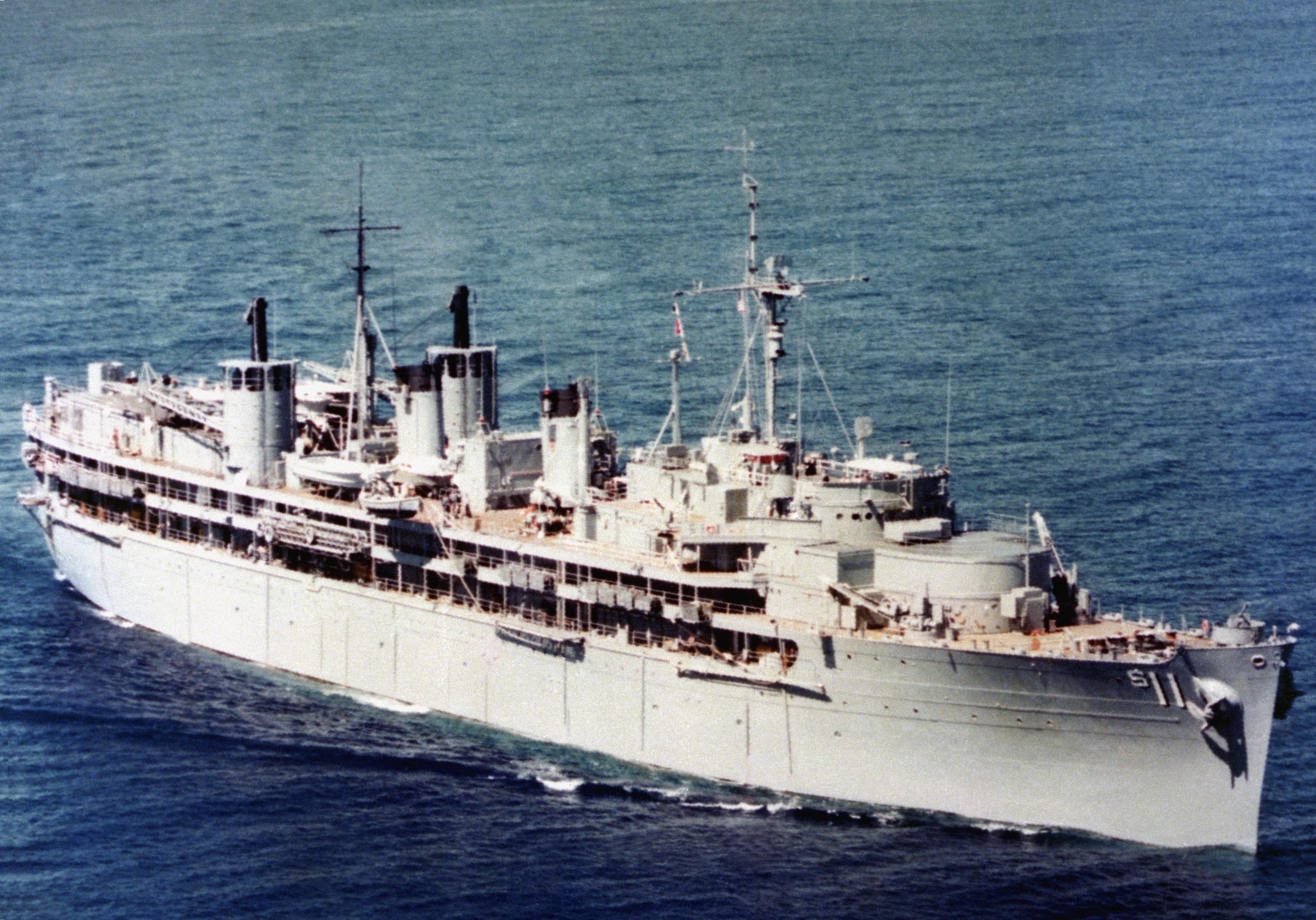
- Fulton (AS-11), 1984

Class overview
- Builders: Mare Island Navy Yard; Moore Dry Dock Company, Oakland, CA
- Operators: US Navy
- Built: 1939 – 1945
- In commission: 1941 – 1993
- Completed: 7
- Active: 0
- Lost: 1(as target)
- Retired: 7
- Scrapped: 6

General characteristics
- Type: submarine tender
- Displacement: 9,250 long tons (9,400 t)
- Length: 530 ft 7 in (161.72 m)
- Beam: 73 ft 4 in (22.35 m)
- Draft: 22 ft 5 in (6.83 m)
- Speed: 15.4 kn (17.7 mph; 28.5 km/h)
- Complement: 1,307 officers and enlisted
- Armament: 4 × 5 in (127 mm) guns
- Notes: Stats from Fulton

The Fulton class was a class of seven United States Navy submarine tenders. The class took its name from the lead ship, USS Fulton (AS-11), which was commissioned 27 December 1940 by Mare Island Navy Yard and sponsored by Mrs. A. T. Sutcliffe, great-granddaughter of Robert Fulton. Fulton was commissioned on 12 September 1941. The basic hull and superstructure for this class was the same as the Dixie-class destroyer tenders and Vulcan-class repair ships.

== Ships in class ==
Ships in class
Ship Name	Hull No.	Builder	Laid down	Launched	Commissioned/Recommissioned	Decommissioned	Link
Fulton	AS-11	Mare Island Navy Yard	19 July 1939	27 December 1940	12 September 1941	3 April 1947	DANFS, NVR
Fulton	AS-11	Mare Island Navy Yard	19 July 1939	27 December 1940	10 April 1951	30 September 1991	DANFS, NVR
Sperry	AS-12	Mare Island Navy Yard	1 February 1941	17 December 1941	1 May 1942	30 September 1982	DANFS, NVR
Bushnell	AS-15	Mare Island Navy Yard	23 December 1941	14 September 1942	10 April 1943	30 April 1948	DANFS, NVR
Bushnell	AS-15	Mare Island Navy Yard	23 December 1941	14 September 1942	1 February 1953	30 June 1970	DANFS, NVR
Howard W. Gilmore	AS-16	Mare Island Navy Yard	21 December 1942	16 September 1943	24 May 1944	30 September 1980	DANFS, NVR
Nereus	AS-17	Mare Island Navy Yard	12 October 1943	12 February 1945	27 October 1945	27 October 1971	DANFS, NVR
Orion	AS-18	Moore Dry Dock Company	31 July 1941	24 June 1942	30 September 1943	3 September 1993	DANFS, NVR
Proteus	AS-19	Moore Dry Dock Company	15 September 1941	12 November 1942	31 January 1944	26 September 1947	DANFS, NVR
Proteus	AS-19	Moore Dry Dock Company	15 September 1941	12 November 1942	8 July 1960	30 September 1992	

In 1959-1960, Proteus was converted to a tender for the Polaris Fleet Ballistic Missile submarines, including the addition of a 13.4 m section amidships. All ships of this class have been decommissioned and scrapped.

== See also ==
- Norwalk Class Cargo Ships
