= USS Sperry =

Tender of the United States Navy

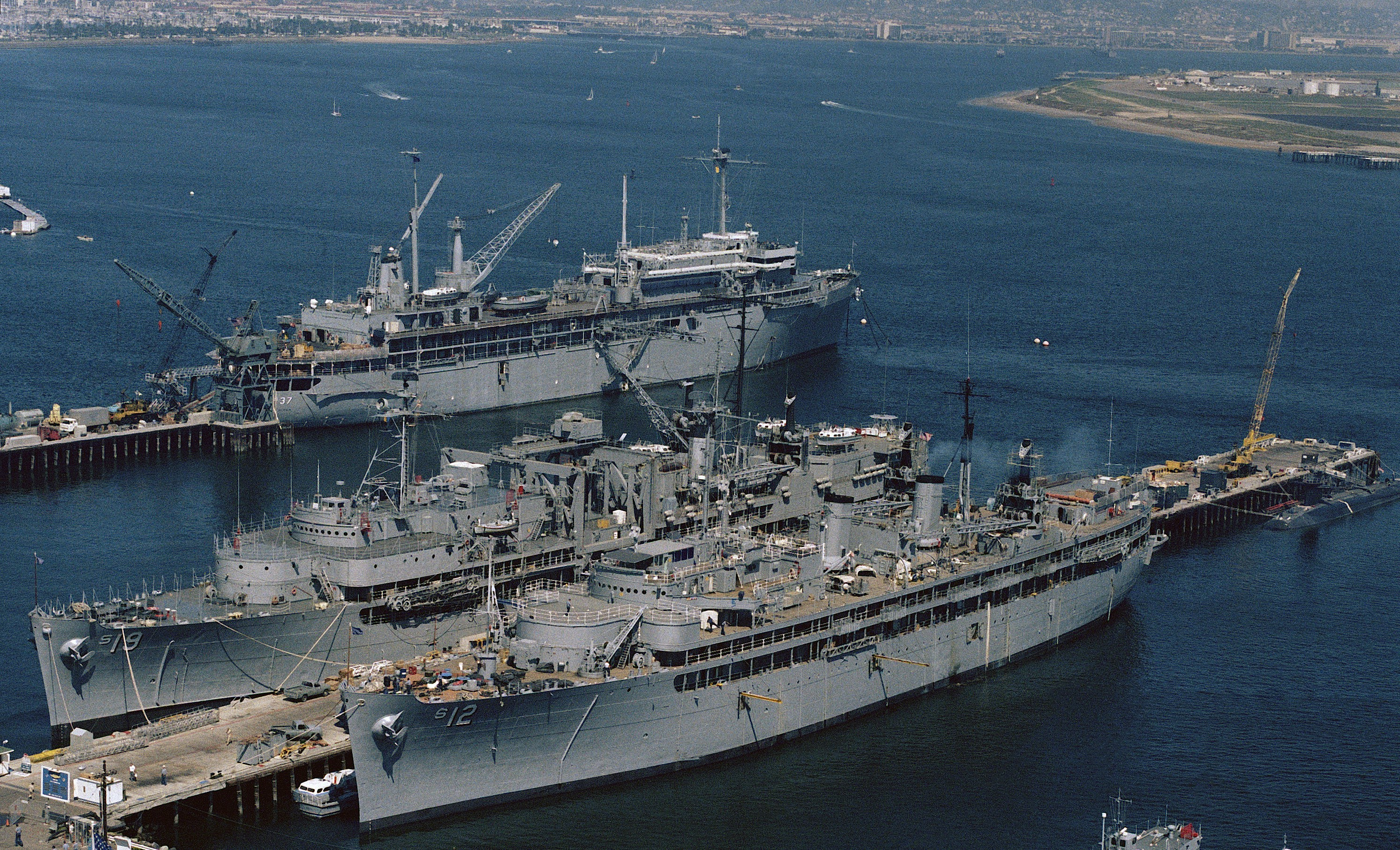
- USS Sperry at San Diego in 1985

History

United States
- Name: USS Sperry
- Namesake: Elmer Ambrose Sperry
- Builder: Mare Island Navy Yard, Vallejo, California
- Laid down: 1 February 1941
- Launched: 17 December 1941
- Commissioned: 1 May 1942
- Decommissioned: 30 September 1982
- Stricken: 30 September 1982
- Fate: Sold for Scrapping 28 July 2011 to ESCO Marine, Brownsville, Tx

General characteristics
- Class & type: Fulton-class submarine tender
- Displacement: 9,250 long tons (9,400 t)
- Length: 530 ft 7 in (161.72 m)
- Beam: 73 ft 4 in (22.35 m)
- Draft: 22 ft 5 in (6.83 m)
- Speed: 15.4 kn (17.7 mph; 28.5 km/h)
- Complement: 1,307 officers and enlisted
- Armament: 4 × 5"/38 caliber gun (127 mm) guns

USS Sperry (AS-12) was a Fulton-class submarine tender in the United States Navy. She was named for Elmer Sperry.

Sperry was laid down on 1 February 1941 at the Mare Island Navy Yard, Vallejo, California; launched on 17 December 1941, just 10 days after the Japanese attack on Pearl Harbor; sponsored by Mrs. Helen Sperry Lea, daughter of Elmer Ambrose Sperry; and commissioned on 1 May 1942, Captain Robert H. Smith in command.

== World War II ==
Sperry completed trials and shakedown training, and on 2 August 1942, she reported for duty to the Commander, Submarines, Pacific, at Pearl Harbor. She remained at Oahu for almost three months, refitting seven submarines and making voyage repairs to four others.

On 26 October, she weighed anchor and headed for Australia. After cautiously skirting the Solomon Islands and making a three-day stopover at Noumea, New Caledonia, the submarine tender reached Brisbane on 13 November. During her two-month stay "down under," Sperry refitted seven submarines and made a voyage repair on one.

On 17 January 1943, she sailed for Pearl Harbor, where she arrived on the 31st. After 10 refits, 10 voyage repairs, and over four months at Pearl Harbor, Sperry got underway on 8 June.

Steaming in company with tanker Kern and Coast Guard cutter Taney, she reached Midway Island on 12 June. Her stay there was probably the busiest period in her career. During five months, she serviced 70 submarines, refitting 17 and making voyage repairs to 53.

She joined submarine rescue ship Florikan in a voyage back to Pearl Harbor from 12 to 16 November. She refitted eight submarines and accomplished voyage repairs on seven others from 15 November 1943 – 9 March 1944, then headed west once again.

Sperry's tour of duty at Majuro Atoll lasted from 15 March-19 September. During her stay, the submarine tender accomplished 19 refits and two voyage repairs. In addition, her crew erected Camp Myrna, the first recuperation camp for submarine crews in the central Pacific area, on Myrna Island.

On 19 September, she exited the lagoon with destroyer Litchfield and headed for Pearl Harbor again. They reached Oahu on the 24th, but Sperry was underway again by 8 October as part of an 11-ship convoy. At Eniwetok, she parted company with the convoy; and, with destroyer escort Corbesier, she continued on to the Marianas Islands. The two ships arrived at Guam on 20 October to begin a four-month tour of duty during which she serviced 20 boats, 14 for refit and six for voyage repairs. Again, her crew constructed a submarine recuperation facility, Camp Dealey.

On 13 February 1945, Sperry and Southard left Guam to return to the United States. The two ships reached Pearl Harbor on 22 February. Southard remained at Pearl Harbor but Sperry continued eastward on 1 March. The submarine tender entered Mare Island Naval Shipyard on 7 March and commenced an overhaul which lasted until 30 April. By 10 May, Sperry was back at Pearl Harbor where she completed one refit and three voyage repairs before sailing on 30 June for the Marianas.

== Post-war service ==
=== 1945-1960 ===
She was stationed at Guam from 11 July 1945 – 11 January 1946. During those six months, her stay in the Marianas was interrupted only once, in late November and early December, when she joined submarines Blenny, Blower, Blueback, Charr, Redfish, Sea Cat, and Segundo in a training cruise. They visited Ulithi Atoll in the Caroline Islands and Manus Island in the Admiralty Islands before returning to Apra Harbor 15 December.

Eleven days into the new year, Sperry weighed anchor at Apra and headed for Long Beach, California. She arrived at Terminal Island on 20 February and began an extensive overhaul which was completed in July 1947. Unlike many of her sister ships, Sperry remained an active unit of the fleet, operating out of San Diego, California. She earned the coveted battle efficiency "E" three years in a row in 1948, 1949, and 1950. In 1949, she participated in Operation Miki, a war game which simulated the recapture of an enemy-occupied Oahu; and, while returning to San Diego, she operated in support of the first publicized firings of missiles from submarines. From 1950 to 1953, she serviced and supplied many of the submarines recommissioned for the Korean War. In 1952, she made her only voyage to the western Pacific, sailing sailed via Pearl Harbor, where she stayed from 6 August-21 September, and serving at Chi Chi Jima in the Bonin Islands from 2–9 October. She returned to the west coast of the United States on 25 October.

In December 1951, the battle lines in Korea were more or less stabilized along the 38th parallel, and hostilities slowly decreased over the next two years; Sperry gradually returned to her peacetime routine. Over the next 10 years, she continued to operate out of San Diego, spending most of her time in port servicing the submarines of the fleet, but occasionally getting underway for training cruises along the west coast. Her area of operation extended from Mexico north to Canada.

=== 1961-2011 ===
From April–September, 1961 Sperry was at Long Beach Naval Shipyard being brought up to date by a Fleet Rehabilitation and Modernization overhaul. In mid-September, she returned to her duties as submarine tender at San Diego, though now with the capability to service ballistic missile submarines.

Sperry serviced submarines out of San Diego for another twenty years, until finally decommissioned there on 30 September 1982 and struck from the Naval Vessel Register that same day. The old tender was transferred to the Maritime Administration on 1 February 1999, and was initially available for possible use as a museum ship.

On 9 August 2011, Sperry was sold by MARAD to ESCO Marine of Brownsville, Tx for $1,526,726 to be dismantled. Sperry departed the Suisun Bay Reserve Fleet on 28 September 2011 to be cleaned of marine growth and loose exterior paint by Allied Defense Recycling at the former Mare Island Naval Shipyard. On 17 October 2011, Sperry departed Mare Island in tow behind the tug Rachel en route to the Panama Canal and transited the Panama Canal on 17 November 2011 being towed by Rachel. Sperry subsequently arrived in Brownsville and was scrapped.

As of 2019, no other ship in the United States Navy has been named Sperry.
