= USS Bushnell (AS-15) =

Tender of the United States Navy

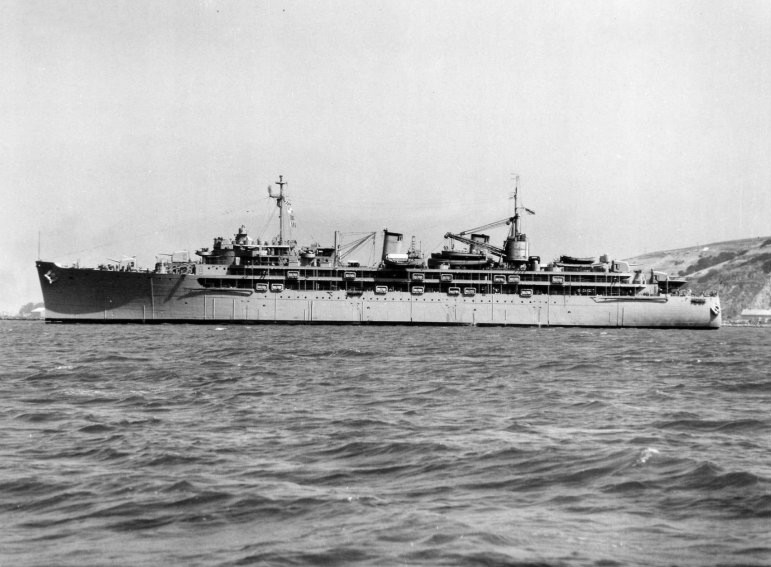
- USS Bushnell in 1947

History

United States
- Namesake: David Bushnell
- Builder: Mare Island Navy Yard
- Launched: 14 September 1942
- Commissioned: 10 April 1943
- Decommissioned: 20 June 1970
- Stricken: 15 November 1980
- Fate: Sunk as target 1 June 1983

General characteristics
- Class & type: Fulton-class submarine tender
- Displacement: 9,734 long tons (9,890 t)
- Length: 530 ft 6 in (161.70 m)
- Beam: 73 ft 4 in (22.35 m)
- Draft: 25 ft 6 in (7.77 m)
- Speed: 18.5 kn (21.3 mph; 34.3 km/h)
- Complement: 444
- Armament: 4 × 5 in (130 mm) guns

USS Bushnell (AS-15) was a Fulton-class submarine tender in service with the United States Navy from 1943 to 1948 and from 1952 to 1970. She was finally sunk as a target ship in 1983.

== History ==
Bushnell launched on 14 September 1942 at the Mare Island Naval Shipyard, California (USA), sponsored by Mrs. Luther Gibson. The tender was commissioned on 10 April 1943.

=== 1943-1948 ===
On 27 June 1943, she departed for Pearl Harbor, arriving on 3 July. While at the Submarine Base, Submarine Squadron 14 (SubRon 14) was assembled with Bushnell serving as tender and staff headquarters for the Squadron and Division Staff. Bushnell remained at Pearl Harbor until September 1943, when she sailed for Midway Island to deliver provisions and structural materials. Upon returning to Pearl Harbor in December, she resumed her task of refitting submarines until April 1944.

Bushnell weighed anchor on 27 April for Majuro Atoll, Marshall Islands, laden with provisions, fuel, and material. Majuro Atoll soon became a regular submarine operating base, although entirely dependent upon the tender. On 5 February 1945, Bushnell returned to Pearl Harbor. On 29 May, the tender steamed to Midway to refit submarines arriving there from war patrols. She was thus engaged until the cessation of hostilities.

From September–December 1945, Bushnell continued to act as a repair vessel for submarines throughout the period of demobilization and peacetime reorganization of the submarine force in the San Diego area. In January 1946, she sailed to Guam to tend submarines engaged in the occupation of Japan. This tour of duty continued until April, at which she was recalled to Pearl Harbor for duty with Submarine Squadron 1. Bushnell operated with SubRon 1 until 24 May 1947. At that time, she sailed to Mare Island for overhaul. Returning to Pearl Harbor on 10 September, she resumed her duties with SubRon 1. In December 1947, Bushnell returned to Mare Island and reported for inactivation. She was placed out of commission in reserve on 30 April 1948.

=== 1952-1970 ===
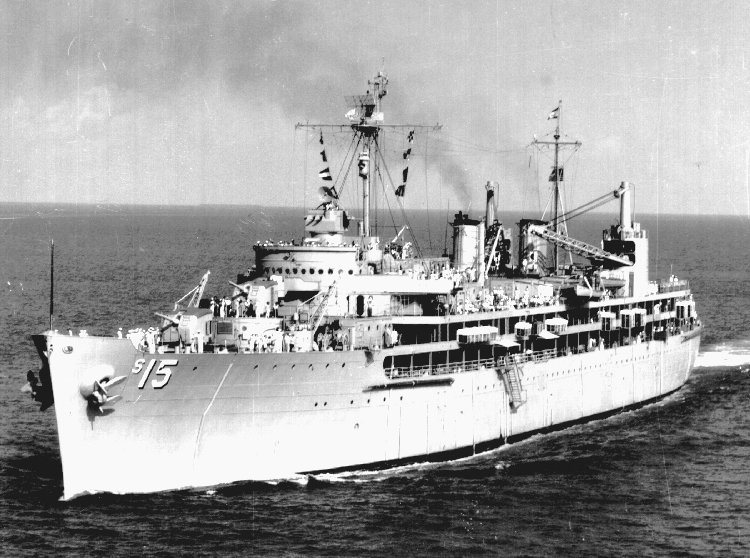
Bushnell in 1963

Bushnell was recommissioned on 21 February 1952. After intensive training along the west coast, she departed for the Atlantic on 7 May. She transited the Panama Canal on 21 May and proceeded to Key West, Florida for duty with SubRon 12. Since that time, she operated from Key West, tending the boats of SubRon 12 as well as conducting brief periods of service at Norfolk and short cruises in the Caribbean. During that time she appeared in the backdrop of the ending of the comedy film Operation Petticoat.

In 1965, she suffered a serious fire in some electrical generation equipment – and earned the nickname "the burning Bush". There was only one minor injury in that incident which did not affect operations for long.

She returned to Key West in 1967 to continue her service to the submarine fleet.

In 1968, she celebrated her 25th year of service. She continued to supply services to SubRon 12 as well as support services to other ships in the Caribbean and Gulf Coast regions. She made regular visits to New Orleans, Mobile, Fort Lauderdale and Kingston, Jamaica.

In 1969, Bushnell was the Navy response ship for Hurricane Camille. She and her crew rebuilt Pilottown, Louisiana, so that river traffic could again move on the Mississippi. Unfortunately, however, her nickname came to haunt her when in early 1970 a high pressure air line ruptured in the bilge, atomizing the oil and other liquids resulting in an explosion and fire which damaged the ship beyond repair. Her own crew did all of her own decommissioning work (not in a shipyard) in early 1970.

She was replaced in Key West by her sister ship Howard W. Gilmore.

Bushnell was placed out of commission on 20 June 1970 and was towed to Norfolk where she was turned over to the Reserve Fleet who used her as their new headquarters. She was struck from the Naval Vessel Register on 15 November 1980.

=== Fate ===
On 31 May 1983, the USS Edenton ATS-1 towed Bushnell out to sea approximately 175 mi (282 km) to 35° 34.7 North, 73° 18.6 West. On 3 June, she was sunk by two MK-48 torpedoes fired by Atlanta, with Finback in company.
