= USS Orion (AS-18) =

Tender of the United States Navy

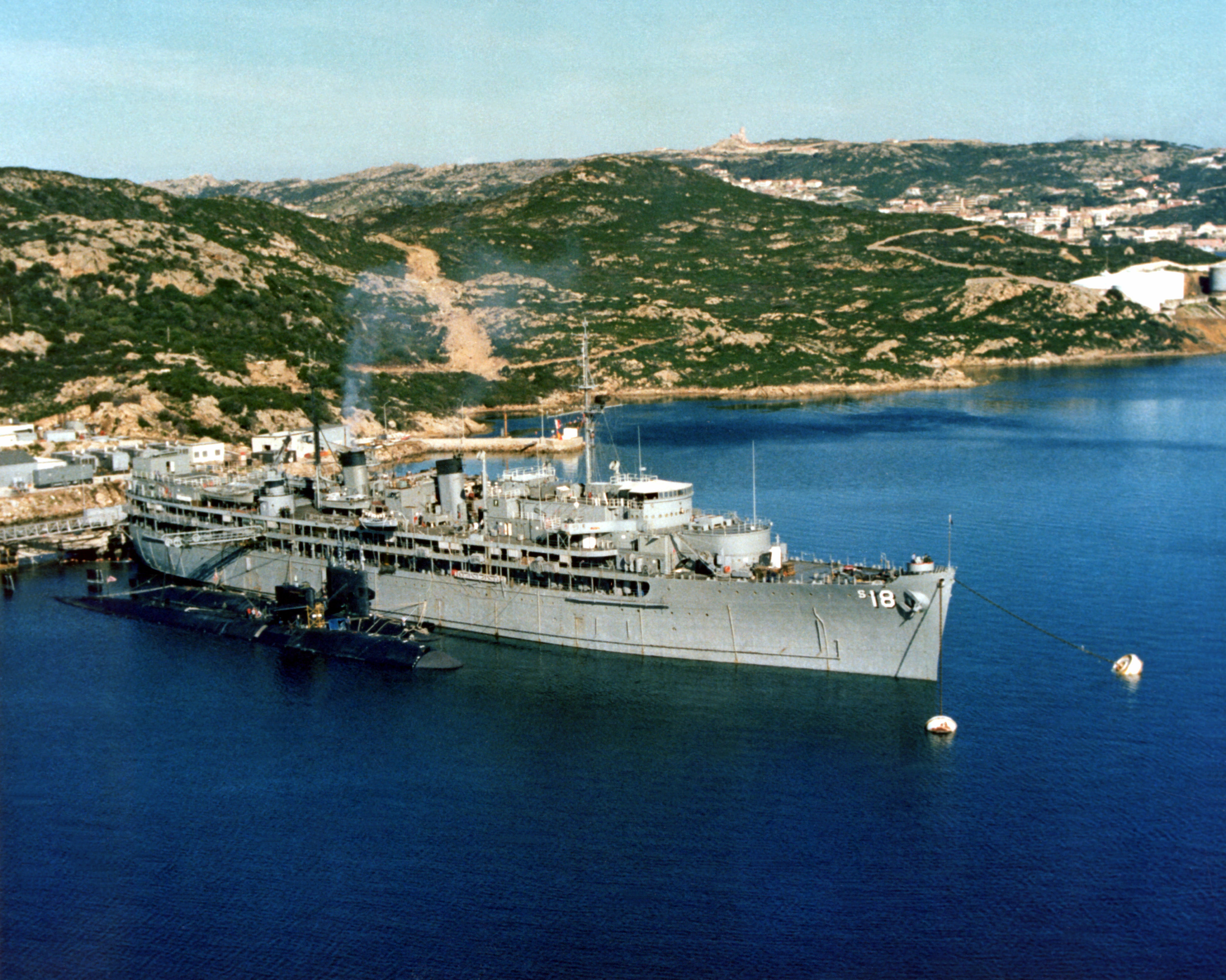
- USS Orion (AS-18), Santo Stephano, Sardinia.

History

United States
- Awarded: 30 December 1940
- Builder: Moore Dry Dock Company, Oakland, California
- Laid down: 31 July 1941
- Launched: 24 June 1942
- Acquired: 30 September 1943
- Commissioned: 30 September 1943
- Decommissioned: 30 September 1993
- Fate: Dismantled by North American Ship Recycling, Baltimore, Maryland, 27 July 2006

General characteristics
- Class & type: Fulton-class submarine tender
- Displacement: 9,250 long tons (9,398 t)
- Length: 530 ft 7 in (161.72 m)
- Beam: 73 ft 4 in (22.35 m)
- Draft: 22 ft 5 in (6.83 m)
- Propulsion: Diesel-electric, 2 screws
- Speed: 15.4 knots (28.5 km/h; 17.7 mph)
- Complement: 1,307 officers and enlisted
- Armament: 4 × 5 in (130 mm) guns

USS Orion (AS–18) was a Fulton-class submarine tender of the United States Navy. She was laid down 31 July 1941 at the Moore Dry Dock Company, Oakland, California; launched 24 June 1942; sponsored by Mrs. Robert A. White; and commissioned 30 September 1943.

== Service history ==
=== World War II, 1943–1945 ===
Following shakedown off southern California, Orion got underway for Pearl Harbor on 23 November 1943. Arriving there on the 28th, she received her first submarine, Gar (SS-206) alongside for repairs two days later. On 10 December she steamed for Australia, arriving at Fremantle 5 January 1944 to begin her mission of maintaining the material readiness of, and an adequate stock of supplies for, submarines operating in the southwest Pacific. She remained in Western Australia until 6 August 1944 when she proceeded to Mios Woendi, Indonesia to establish Advanced Submarine Base Able. Arriving 26 August 1944, she serviced 24 submarines, and 466 surface vessels, before being relieved, 9 December 1944, by Griffin (AS-13).

The next day Orion headed back to Hawaii for overhaul. On 8 April 1945 she sailed west again. At Saipan between 23 April and 1 September 1945, she served as CTG 17.7 and as SOPA (Admin) for Tanapag Harbor in addition to her tender and repair activities which were performed for over 300 ships.

=== Post-war, 1945–1993 ===
As the formal surrender documents were being signed in Tokyo Bay, Orion was en route to the United States. Assigned to the Atlantic Fleet, she operated off the east coast for four months, then sailed south to Balboa, C. Z. Taking up duties with SubRon 6, 24 January 1946, she remained in the Panama Canal Zone, with one interruption for overhaul, until 11 May 1949. Then, with SubRon 6, she steamed to Norfolk, her new homeport.

After that change of homeport, Orion continued to service SubRon 6 at Norfolk and, during fleet exercises, in the Caribbean Sea. A FRAM II overhaul and conversion to nuclear support, 6 September 1960 – 25 February 1961, was followed by refresher training off Cuba. In June; her first nuclear submarine job came alongside in the form of Shark (SSN-591). Three years later she added foreign nuclear submarines to her long list of services performed after completing work on HMS Dreadnought. Support of SubRon 6, however, continued to be Orion’s primary mission. Into 1970 she serviced the conventional and nuclear-powered ships of that squadron from the Destroyer/Submarine Piers at Norfolk.

Orion served SUBRON 4 out of Charleston Naval Base, Pier November during the 1970s. On 15 October 1970, Orion's homeport changed to Charleston, South Carolina under the command of Submarine Squadron FOUR. From July 1979 through March 1980, ORION underwent overhaul in Charleston Naval Shipyard in preparation for an overseas change of homeport.

On 1 June 1980, Orion was deployed to Santo Stefano, Italy, servicing ships of the Sixth Fleet in the Mediterranean Sea until 1993, when she was relieved by Simon Lake. Orion returned to the United States and was decommissioned 3 September 1993. Ex-Orion was transferred to the Maritime Administration for storage 1 May 1999 and sold to North American Ship Recycling, Baltimore, Maryland to be dismantled on 27 July 2006.

At the time of her decommissioning in 1993, Orion was the oldest active ship in the US Navy's fleet. Accordingly, she flew the "Don't Tread On Me" flag toward the end of her service.
