= Mare Island Naval Shipyard Airfield =

US Navy airfield at Mare Island, California, USA

Coordinates: 38.089°N 122.272°W

- Vallejo, California
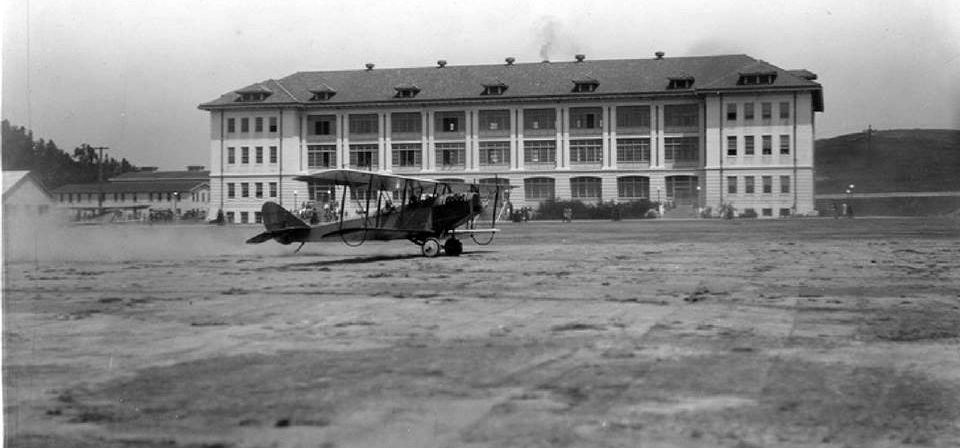
- Curtiss JN-4 Jenny taking off from Mare Island Naval Shipyard Airfield, with the Marine Barracks (Building M37) in background

Site information
- Type: Military airfield
- Controlled by: United States Navy

Site history
- Built: 1922-1937
- Events: USS Langley support

Mare Island Naval Shipyard Airfield was a post-World War 1 US Navy airfield that opened around 1922 and closed in 1937 at Mare Island Naval Shipyard in the city of Vallejo, California. The airfield was located at 13th Street & Flagship Drive on the naval base, just west of the Marine Barracks (Building M37). The airfield had a single unpaved runway for day use only. Common aircraft at the airfield were Vought FU, Vought VE-7 and Curtiss JN-4 Jenny.

The first aviation activity at Mare Island took place as early as 1919, when three Mather field Army Air Corps planes landed on and took off from the Marine Parade Ground. The first Naval aviation at Mare Island took place in August 1923, when several Navy planes arrived at the airfield while the aircraft tender Aroostook had set up some temporary hangar-sheds.

The airbase at Mare Island was established as a support base for the first US Navy aircraft carrier, USS Langley, which had her origin at Mare Island. The collier USS Jupiter, the first turbo-electric-powered ship of the US Navy, was built at Mare Island Naval Shipyard in 1912 and was later converted into the first US aircraft carrier, USS Langley, at Norfolk Naval Shipyard, Portsmouth, Virginia during 1920-1922. During the next decade and a half, she would visit Mare Island Naval Shipyard at least two times. As converted, Langley could hold up to 34 planes, but her planes need to be removed to the Airfield whenever she was at the Shipyard for overhauls or refittings.

Her first overhaul at Mare Island Naval Shipyard was in 1925, when her flight deck was lengthened by 23 ft (7.0 m) and her complement of airplanes was increased to two full squadrons (36 aircraft) on deck with six more stored below. In 1928 the catapult on her front deck was removed. Langley's last visit to Mare Island Naval Shipyard was between October 1936 and February 1937, when she was converted again, this time to a seaplane tender.

The airfield was also used for training. The Mare Island Naval Shipyard Airfield was disestablished in 1937 when nearby Naval Air Station Alameda was officially picked to be the Navy's main support base for aircraft carriers in San Francisco Bay.

== See also ==
- California during World War II
- American Theater (1939–1945)
- United States home front during World War II
