= USS Howard W. Gilmore =

Tender of the United States Navy

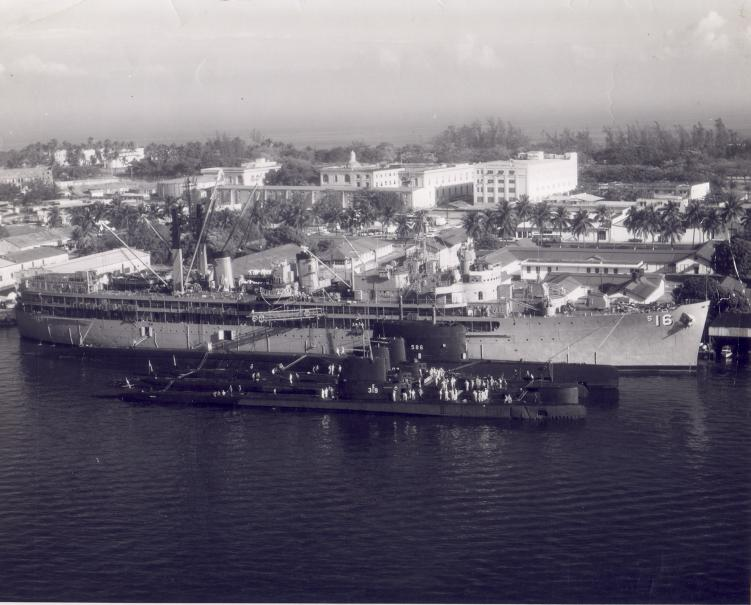
- USS Howard W. Gilmore in the 1960s

History

United States
- Name: USS Howard W. Gilmore (AS-16)
- Namesake: Howard W. Gilmore
- Builder: Mare Island Navy Yard
- Launched: 16 September 1943
- Commissioned: 24 May 1944
- Decommissioned: 30 September 1980
- Stricken: 1 December 1980
- Motto: Service for the silent service
- Fate: Scrapped, March 2006

General characteristics
- Class & type: Fulton-class submarine tender
- Displacement: 9,250 long tons (9,398 t)
- Length: 529 ft 6 in (161.39 m)
- Beam: 73 ft 4 in (22.35 m)
- Draft: 23 ft 6 in (7.16 m)
- Speed: 18 knots (33 km/h; 21 mph)
- Complement: 1,303
- Armament: 4 × 5 in (130 mm) guns

USS Howard W. Gilmore (AS-16) was a Fulton-class submarine tender in service with the United States Navy from 1944 to 1980. She was scrapped in 2006.

== History ==
USS Howard W. Gilmore was originally named Neptune but renamed Howard W. Gilmore in honor of Commander Howard W. Gilmore, a Medal of Honor recipient. She was launched by the Mare Island Navy Yard at Mare Island, California, on 16 September 1943, sponsored by Mrs. Gilmore, widow of Howard W. Gilmore and was commissioned 24 May 1944.

=== World War II ===
For her first two months, Howard W. Gilmore conducted shakedown training out of San Diego, California. After loading parts and supplies, she sailed on 12 August for Pearl Harbor, arriving on 18 August 1944.

Howard W. Gilmore arrived at Majuro Atoll on 19 September 1944 and began her vital tending duties. In the four following months she made voyage repairs on submarines, replenished them, and helped in training both crewmen and repairmen. These tasks contributed to the attacks on Japanese shipping which hastened the end of the war. The ship also provided repairs and parts for surface ships when necessary.

Returning to Pearl Harbor on 29 January 1945, the ship took on replacement crews for Australia based submarines and sailed for Brisbane, arriving on 23 February 1945, although the tender was soon underway again, this time sailing via Humboldt Bay to Subic Bay, Philippines, with supplies for an advanced base. The Howard W. Gilmore arrived on 13 March 1945 and immediately started refitting 7th Fleet submarines and setting up a recuperation area for their crews. She continued this duty through the climactic days of the Pacific war, sailing for the East Coast, via Pearl Harbor and Panama 31 August 1945. Arriving in New York City on 17 October, the Howard W. Gilmore took part in the Navy Day celebrations in New York Harbor, where the fleet was reviewed by President Harry S. Truman.

=== 1946–1961 ===
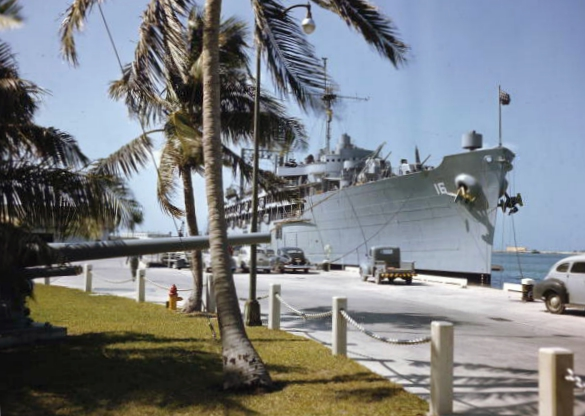
USS Howard W. Gilmore docked at Key West in 1949.

After a short stay in New London, Connecticut, the Howard W. Gilmore steamed to Portsmouth, New Hampshire, to load torpedoes, then sailed to her new home port, Key West, where she arrived 25 January 1946. Serving Submarine Squadron 4, the ship was to stay in Florida for the greater part of the next 13 years, serving submarines on their training and readiness duties. The ship occasionally tended submarines at Norfolk, Virginia and deployed to the Caribbean twice during this period, notably for Operation Springboard, a fleet exercise in the Caribbean in 1958.

The Howard W. Gilmore sailed into Charleston harbor on 30 July 1959 to take up her tending duties from this new base. In addition to servicing submarines during the next 18 months, the ship rode out Hurricane Donna in September 1960 off Charleston. During 1961 she operated off the Florida coast before entering Charleston Naval Shipyard in November for a major overhaul. During this repair period, the Howard W. Gilmore was fitted with facilities for servicing nuclear submarines, increasing her versatility and usefulness for today's nuclear Navy. With this Fleet Rehabilitation and Modernization Overhaul (FRAM) completed the ship returned to the Caribbean for refresher training before resuming tender duties at Charleston.

=== 1962–1980 ===
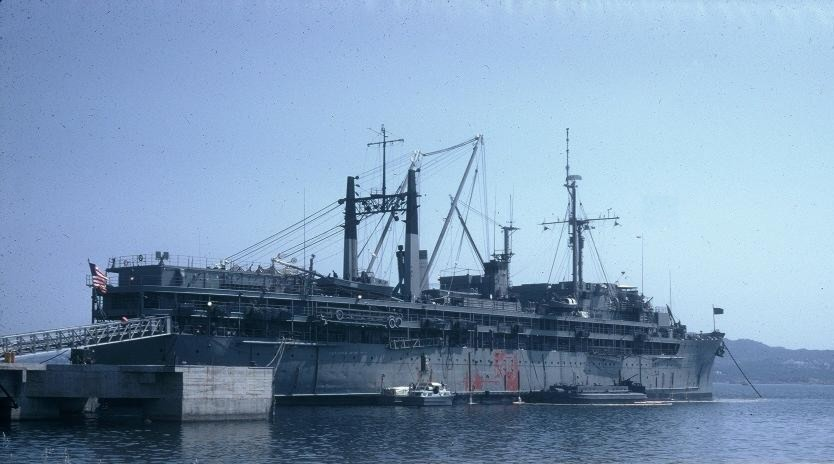
USS Howard W. Gilmore at La Maddalena, Sardinia sometime after 1973

In October 1962 the introduction of offensive missiles into Cuba brought a strong response from the American President and people, a naval quarantine of the island. The Howard W. Gilmore's crew worked around the clock servicing two squadrons of submarines for Caribbean operations. From 1963 into 1967, the veteran tender continued to serve submarines from her home port, Charleston, making short cruises for training off the South Carolina coast and in the Caribbean.

In 1970, The Howard W. Gilmore relieved the Bushnell (AS-15) at Key West, then after some yard time on the Mississippi and Alabama Gulf Coast, she departed for her new homeport of La Maddalena, Sardinia, Italy – where she provided service and support. From 1973 until JUNE 01 1980, the ship's home port was Santo Stefano (La Maddalena), Sardinia where it was relieved by the USS Orion AS-18. "Replenishment" ports-of-call incl. Palma, Mallorca, Tunis, Tunisia and Villefranche-sur-Mer, France In 1980, Howard W. Gilmore returned to Norfolk, Virginia and was decommissioned and In March 2006, she was scrapped.
