= Mare Island Naval Shipyard =

- U.S. National Register of Historic Places
- U.S. National Historic Landmark District
- California Historical Landmark
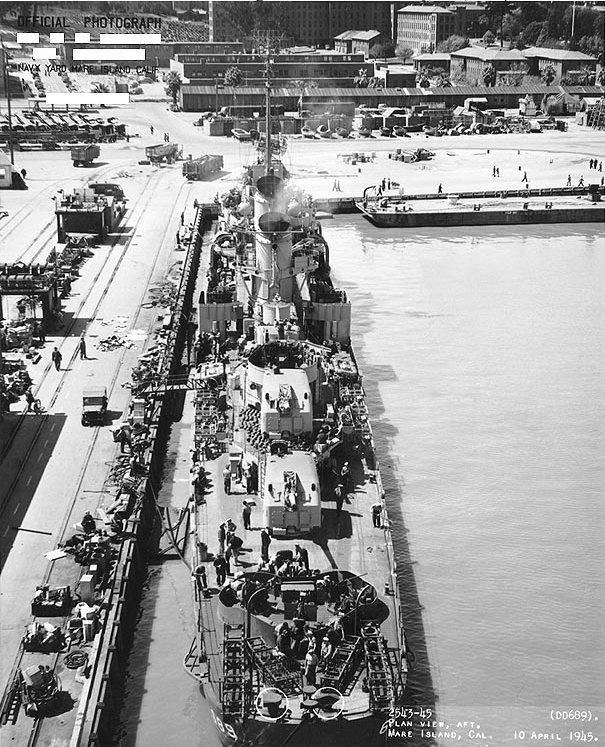
- USS Wadleigh at Mare Island Naval Yard, 10 April 1945.

- Location within California Location within the United States
- Location: Vallejo, California
- Coordinates: 38°5′24″N 122°15′48″W
- Built: 1854
- NRHP reference No.: 75002103
- CHISL No.: 751

Significant dates
- Added to NRHP: 15 May 1975
- Designated NHLD: 15 May 1975
- Designated CHISL: 1960

The Mare Island Naval Shipyard (MINSY or MINS) was the first United States Navy base established on the Pacific Ocean and was in service 142 years from 1854 to 1996. It is located on the peninsula of Mare Island, which is part of the city of Vallejo, on San Pablo Bay in the San Francisco Bay Area of California, 23 miles (37 km) northeast of San Francisco. MINSY made a name for itself as the premier U.S. West Coast submarine port as well as serving as the controlling force in San Francisco Bay Area shipbuilding efforts during World War II.

The naval base was closed on 31 March 1996, with more than 7,500 civilians on its payroll, and has gone through several redevelopment phases. It was registered as a California Historical Landmark in 1960, and parts of it were declared a National Historic Landmark District in 1975.

== Beginnings ==
In September 1849, Lieutenant Commander William Pope McArthur was placed in command of the US survey schooner Ewing, which had been brought around Cape Horn to the West Coast by Lieutenant Washington Allon Bartlett. Upon reaching San Francisco, Ewing and the other ship assigned to the survey, USS Massachusetts, were hampered from progress due to desertions of their crews to the gold fields, including a mutiny when crew members rowing into the city from Ewing threw an officer overboard in an attempt to desert. They managed to survey the Mare Island Strait before steaming to Hawaii to obtain crewmen from Hawaiian monarch King Kamehameha III. They returned to San Francisco in the spring of 1850 with the coastal survey of northern California beginning on 4 April 1850 and continued up to the mouth of the Columbia River. On 1 August 1850, while still in Oregon, McArthur purchased a 1/16 interest in Mare Island for $468.50 then returned to San Francisco later that month to prepare charts and write reports.

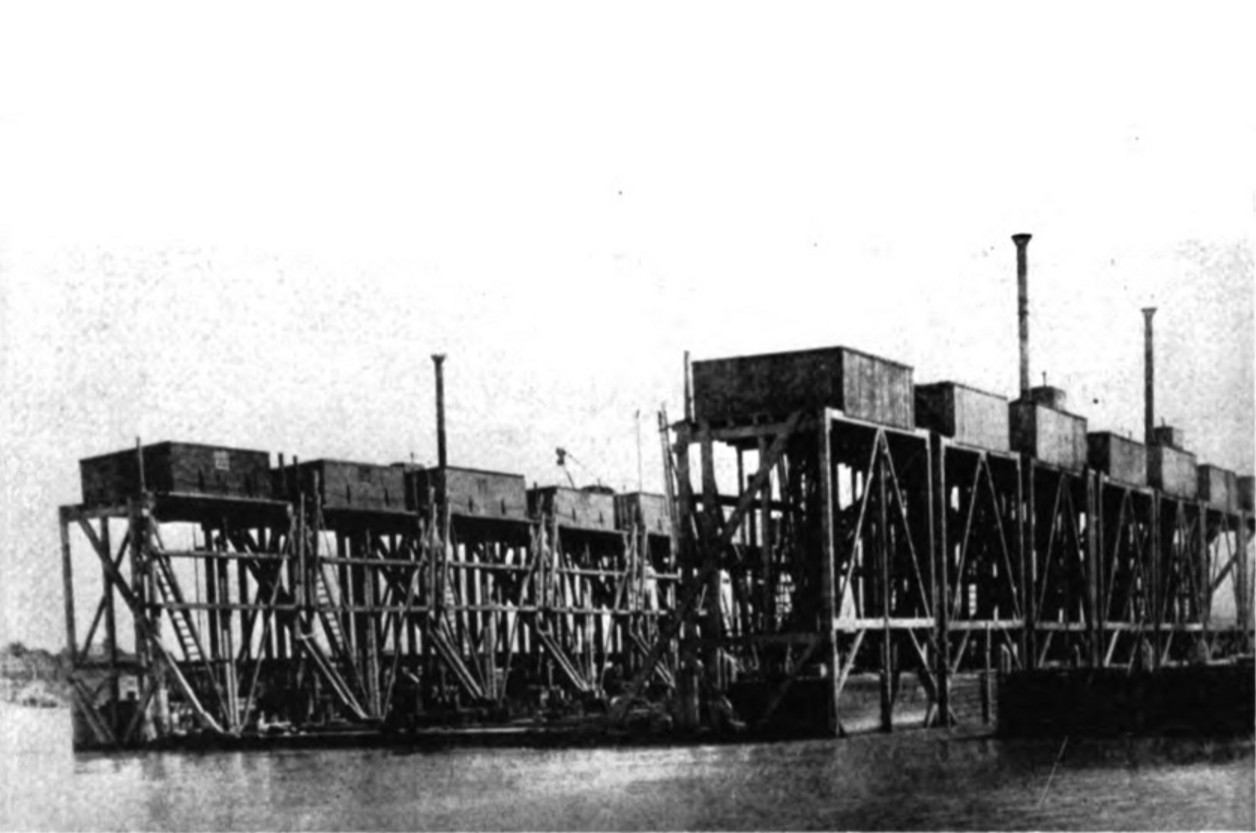
Floating dry dock, Mare Island Navy Yard, ca. 1854. This was the first drydock on the Pacific coast; built in New York, shipped in sections around Cape Horn, arrived in San Francisco August 1852.

On 15 January 1852, Secretary of the Navy William A. Graham ordered a Naval Commission to select a site for a naval yard on the Pacific Coast. Commodore D. Sloat along with Commodore C. Ringgold, Simon F. Blunt and William P.S. Sanger (former overseer of construction of Drydock Number One, Norfolk Naval Shipyard) were appointed to the commission. On 13 July 1852, Sloat recommended Mare Island, across Mare Island Strait from the settlement of Vallejo. The next month, a sectional floating dry dock, authorized by Secretary Graham for use in California, arrived in San Francisco. It was built in New York and shipped in sections around Cape Horn. In 1853, the Navy purchased Mare Island, the original 956 acres (387 ha) of land for MINSY, for a grand sum of $83,491; subsequently the floating dry dock was moved into place in Mare Island Strait. McArthur's family share (he had died a few months after purchasing his share of Mare Island) was $5,218. Based on observations at the site, Sanger conceived the original plan for the naval yard at Mare Island, later formalized by planners at the Navy Bureau of Yards and Docks in Washington, D.C. Although the 1854 Sanger plan was basically sound and mostly implemented, it did not overcome its natural shortcoming: the naval yard was built on an island on shallow San Pablo Bay.

On 16 September 1854, the Navy commenced shipbuilding and ship repair operations at Mare Island under the command of then-Commander David Farragut, who later gained fame during the U.S. Civil War Battle of Mobile Bay, when he gave the order, "Damn the torpedoes, full speed ahead!" Farragut and his newly appointed Civil Engineer, Daniel Turner, began to implement Sanger's original plan with only a few minor modifications. Of the early buildings constructed under Turner, five are still standing in historic Shipyard North: Building 46, a smithery built in 1856; Building 71, a storage built in 1858; Building 85, a foundry built in 1858; Building 87, a machine shop built in 1858; and Building 89/91, a boiler shop built in 1858. The other MINSY area constructed was the Ammunition Depot at the south end of the Island, used to store ordnance from warships under repair. Still standing from the Turner years in Ammunition Depot is Building A1, a magazine built in 1857.

MINSY served as a major Pacific Ocean repair station during the late 19th century, handling American as well as Japanese and Russian vessels in the course of duty.

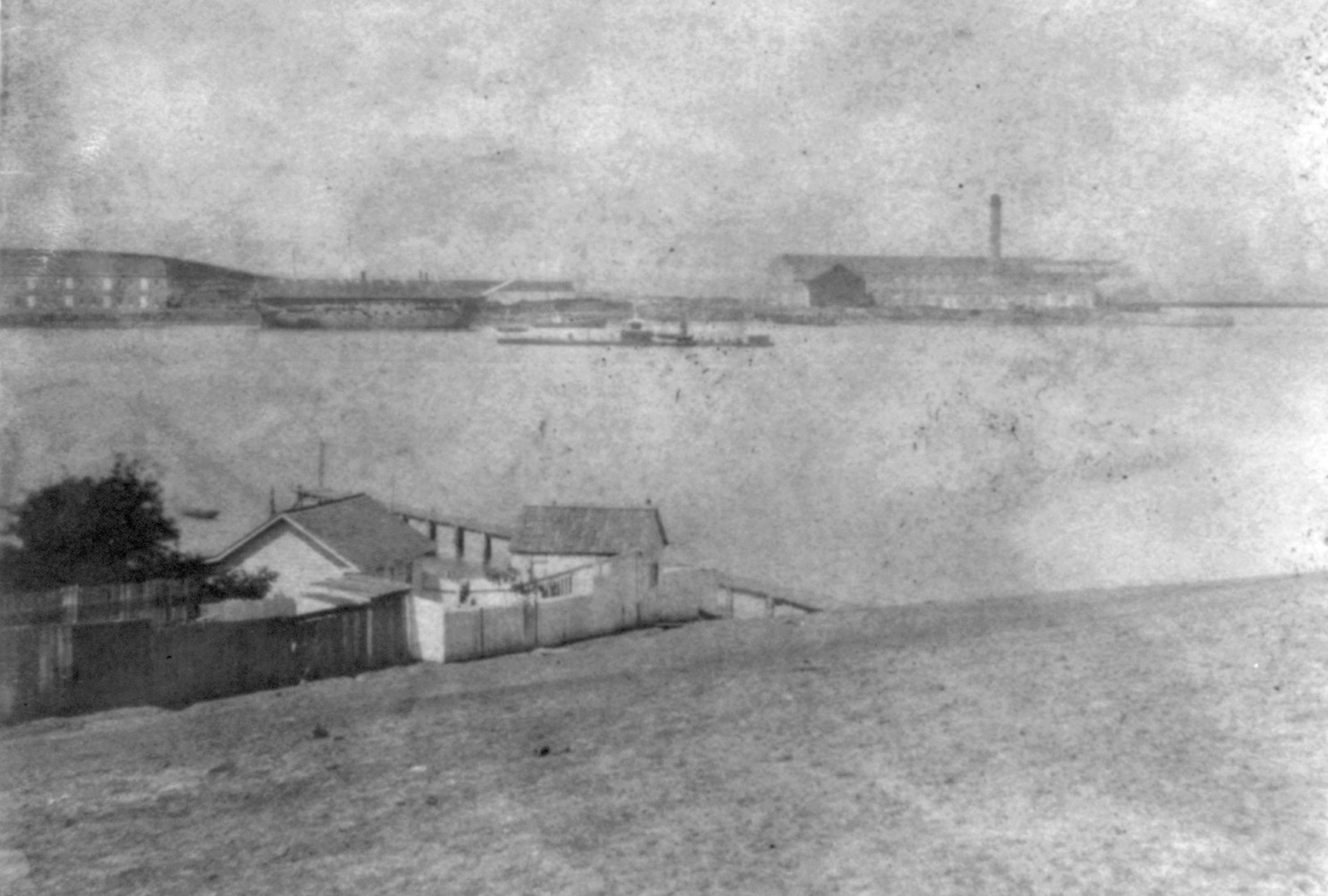
Monitor Camanche at Mare Island, 1866.

In 1861, the longest lived of the clipper ships, Syren, was brought to Mare Island Navy Yard for $15,000 of repairs. Syren had struck Mile Rock twice while trying to sail out of the Golden Gate.

Marines first arrived for duty in 1862 under the command of Maj Addison Garland, who was the first officer to command the Marine barracks on the island.

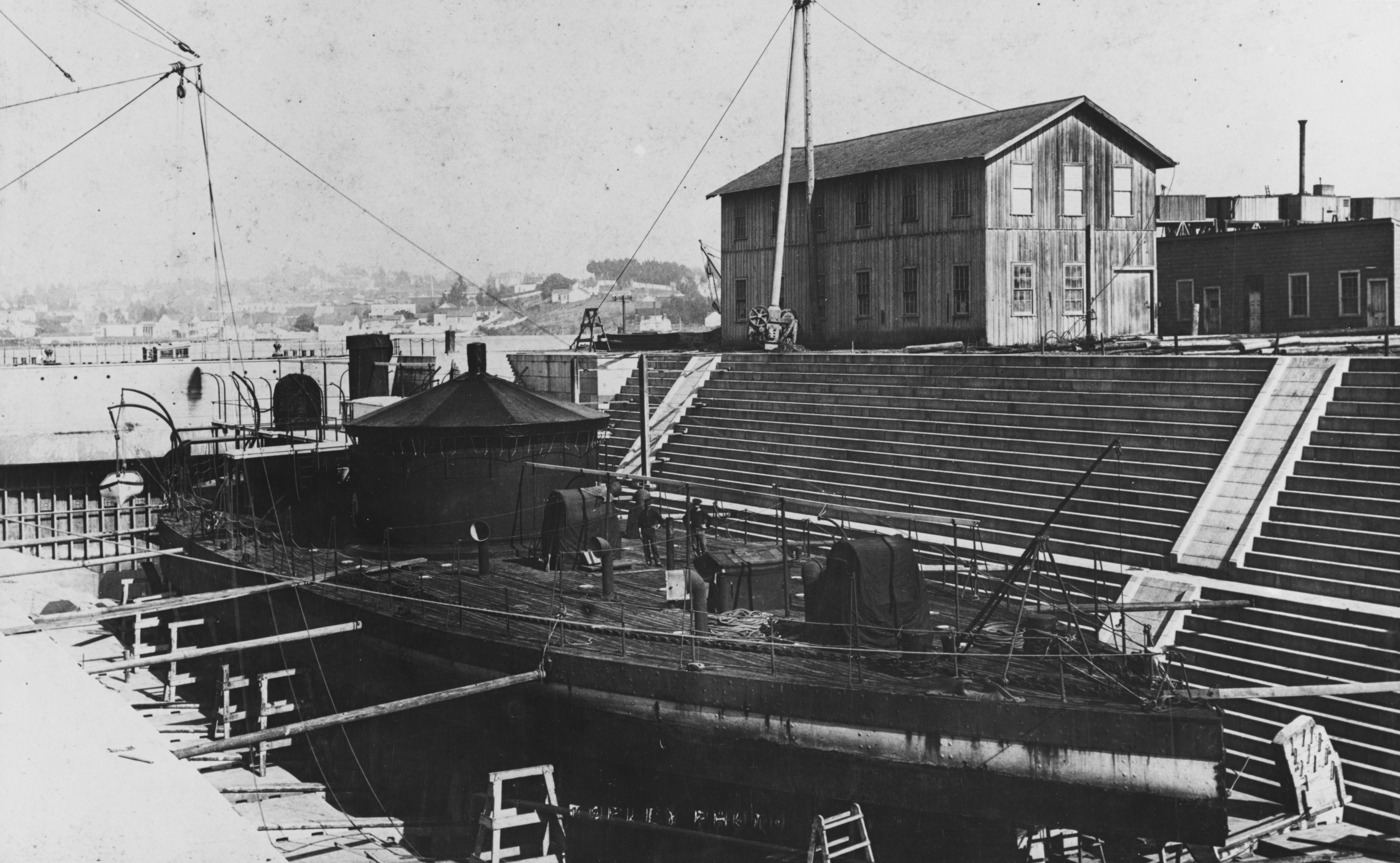
Monitor Camanche in dry dock at Mare Island, c1890.

Built in 1901 under the guidance of Chaplain Adam A. McAlister and U.S. Senator George C. Perkins, St. Peter's Chapel was the second chapel built on a U.S. Navy property, the first in the Pacific, and the first interdenominational chapel in the armed services. According to historian McDonald, "The chapel, more than any other building, bears witness to the closeness of the community that developed at the Mare Island Naval Shipyard."

Mare Island Naval Shipyard also took a commanding role in civil defense and emergency response on the West Coast, dispatching warships to the Pacific Northwest to subdue Native American unrest. MINSY sent ships such as Wyoming south to Central America and the Panama Canal to protect US political and commercial interests. Some of the support, logistics and munition requirements for the Spanish–American War were filled by Mare Island. MINSY sent men, materiel and ships to San Francisco in response to the fires following the 1906 earthquake. Arctic rescue missions were mounted as necessary. Ordnance manufacturing and storage were two further key missions at MINSY for nearly all of its active service, including ordnance used prior to the American Civil War.

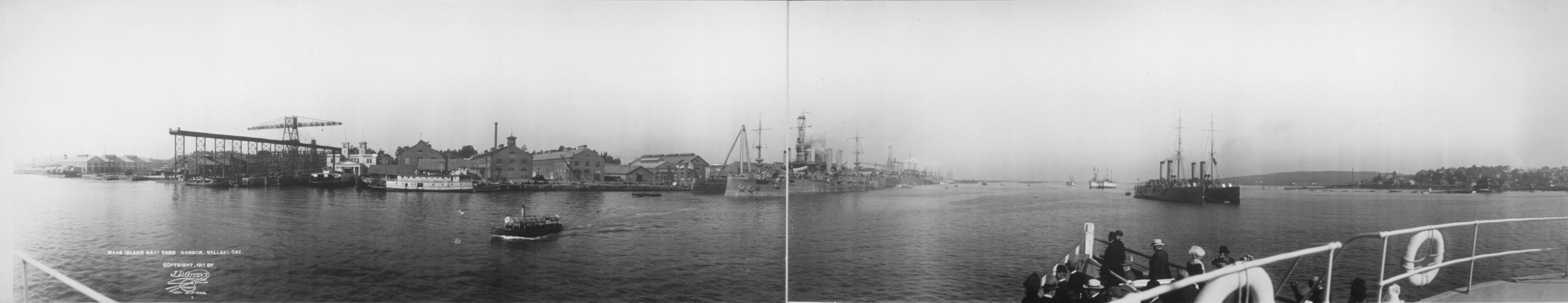
Mare Island Naval Shipyard, in 1911.

In 1911, the Marine Corps established two West Coast recruit training depots first at Mare Island, the second at Puget Sound, Washington. Mare Island eventually became the West Coast's only recruit training facility when the Puget Sound operation consolidated to the San Francisco Bay Area in 1912. Instructors trained recruits there until 10 August 1923, when they relocated to Marine Corps Recruit Depot San Diego.

== World War I ==
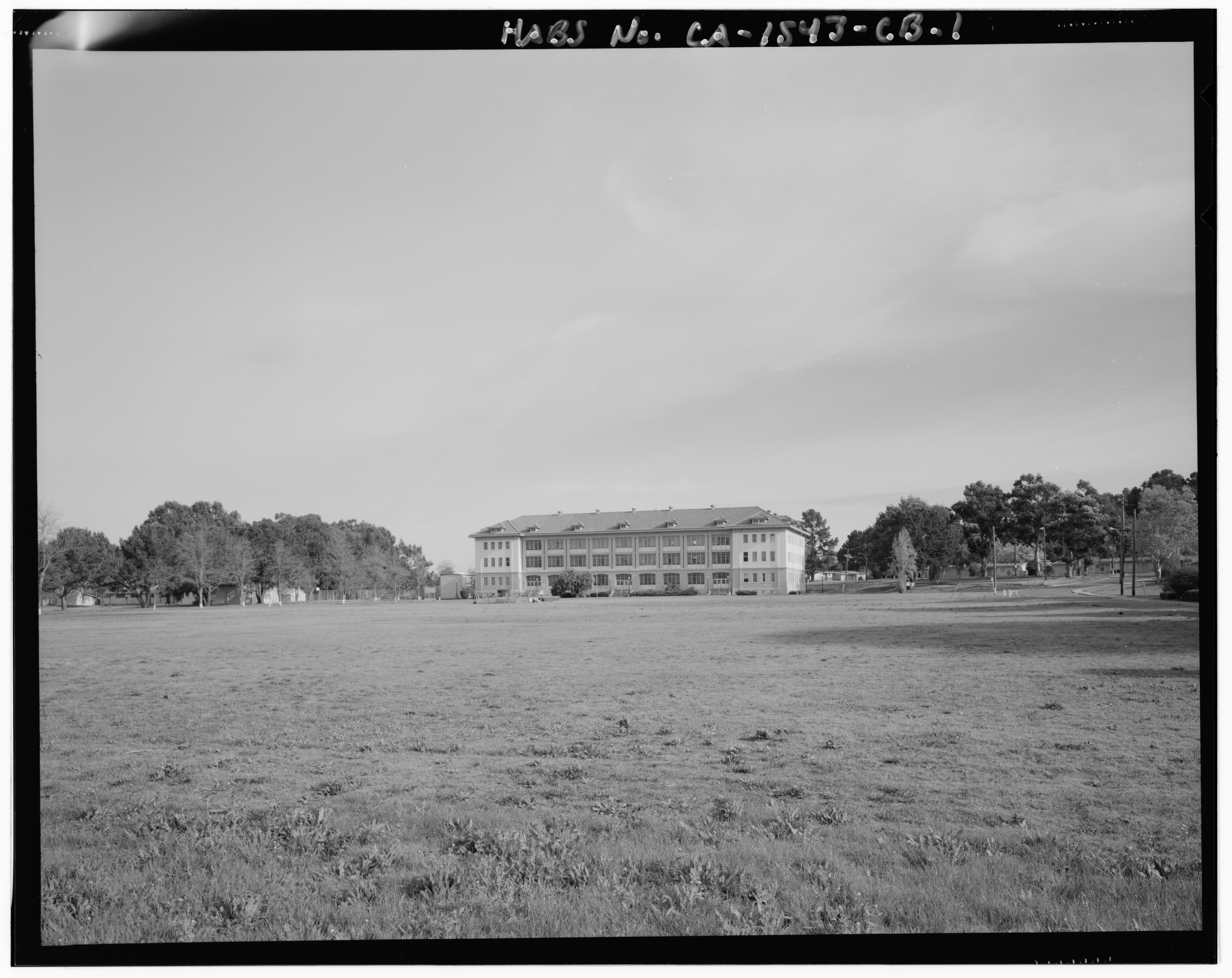
Looking across parade grounds at Building M37 (Marine Barracks & Headquarters); camera facing east.

In 1917, when the Marine Expeditionary Force in the Pacific was assigned to Mare Island, the MINSY Marine Corps compound, which was always under Marine Corps command, was relocated to the large hilltop isolated from and west of Shipyard South. The newly built Building M37, a handsome three-story reinforced-concrete building of Beaux Arts design, occupied the entire eastern end of a huge parade ground. It served as the focal point, headquarters, and barracks of the Marine Corps detachment at MINSY. During World War I, the MINSY Marine Corps compound was the major training station on the West Coast.

In July 1917, MINSY was the site of a major explosion that killed six people. On 9 July, a gunpowder magazine containing 127,600 pounds of black powder blew up, damaging a number of surrounding buildings, and leaving a mystery as to what had caused it. Suspicion settled on an identified German agent and possible saboteur, Lothar Witzke, but the investigation proved inconclusive and the official verdict was that the cause was unknown. Stephen C. Ruder has suggested in a 2022 article that it may not have been an act of German sabotage but suicide by a civilian, Neil Damstedt, who was the principal victim and only individual inside the magazine at the moment of explosion.

MINSY saw major shipbuilding efforts during World War I. MINSY holds a shipbuilding speed record for a destroyer that still stands, launching USS Ward in just 17 1/2 days in May–June 1918. Mare Island was selected by the Navy for construction of the only US West Coast-built dreadnought battleship, USS California, launched in 1919. Several pre-dreadnought battleships had previously been launched at San Francisco and Seattle. Noting the power of underwater warfare shown by German U-boats in World War I, the Navy doubled their Pacific-based submarine construction program at Puget Sound Naval Shipyard by founding a submarine program at MINSY in the early 1920s.

=== Mare Island Marines Football Team ===
During this period, the Marines stationed at MINSY fielded a college football team which competed against teams in the Pacific Coast Conference and other military service football teams. After the United States entered WWI during April 1917, many college athletes joined or were drafted into the military. Enrolments diminished at universities around the country, with many schools cutting back their sports programs as a result. Consequently, military academies and training bases established football teams composed mostly of college players who had been recruited for service. This was further encouraged by officials who considered football to be excellent war training, with its themes of leadership, teamwork, and discipline. The 1917 Mare Island Marines football team strung together an impressive first season, going 8–0, shutting out six opponents, winning the 1918 Rose Bowl against the Camp Lewis 91st Division football team, and outscoring all of their opponents by a combined total of 200 to 10. This was despite only 500 Marines being stationed at the base when the team was formed. The 1918 Mare Island Marines football team fielded an entirely new roster, which achieved a similar level of success as the previous year. They finished the season with a 10–1 record, losing only in the 1919 Rose Bowl to the Great Lakes Navy Bluejackets.

=== Interwar years ===
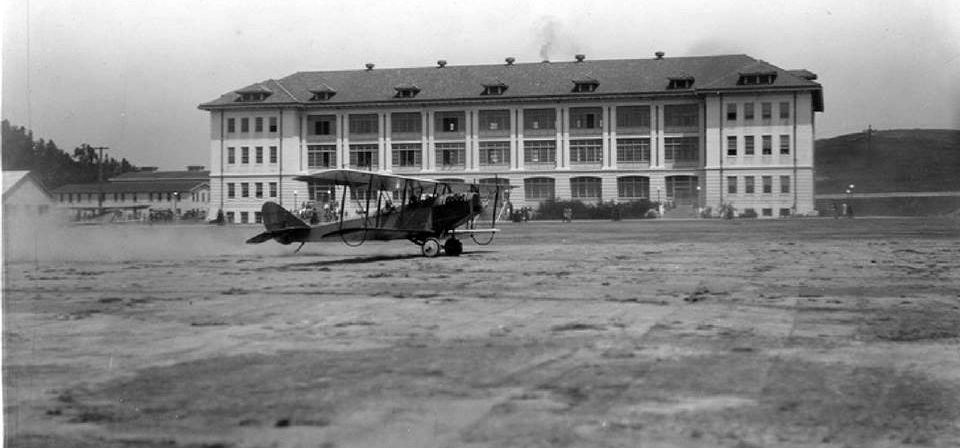
Curtiss JN-4 Jenny taking off from Mare Island Naval Shipyard Airfield, with the Marine Barracks (Building M37) in background

The Marine Corps training continued after World War I until 1921, when the Marine Corps recruitment center opened in San Diego. The MINSY Marine Corps detachment continued to occupy Building M37 until 1996, but never regained its pre-1921 importance. From around 1922 to 1937, an airfield was established west of the Marine Barracks (Building M37) as a support base for the Navy's first aircraft carrier, USS Langley, which had her origin at Mare Island. When Langley was at MINSY for repairs, her planes had to be removed to the MINSY airfield, which was also used for training. At her overhaul at MINSY in 1925, her deck was extended 23 feet, increasing her complement of planes to two full squadrons (36 planes). From October 1936 to February 1937, she was converted to a seaplane tender at MINSY.

In 1919, MINSY was finally, after 65 years, linked to mainland Vallejo by a causeway with a drawbridge, which provided direct land-based movement of supplies and personnel across Mare Island Strait. Owing to the shallowness of the shipping channels in Mare Island Strait and San Pablo Bay, the larger battleships and carriers of the Pacific fleet were sent not to MINSY but to leased dry docks then-privately owned at Hunters Point. However, submarine work was especially suited for Mare Island. MINSY became the major West Coast submarine repair facility in WWI and in 1925 was awarded a contract to build its first submarine, USS Nautilus. In the 1930s, land reclamation nearly doubled the usable acreage on Mare Island. For example, the low-lying North End marshland were raised above high tide, making it available for future MINSY expansion.

Before World War II, the Navy established Station I at Mare Island as one of four High Frequency Direction Finding (HFDF) stations on the Pacific mainland to track Japanese naval and merchant shipping east of Hawaii. The other stations were: Point Arguello, California (Station Z), Point Saint George, California (Station T), and Fort Stevens, Oregon (Station S).

== World War II ==
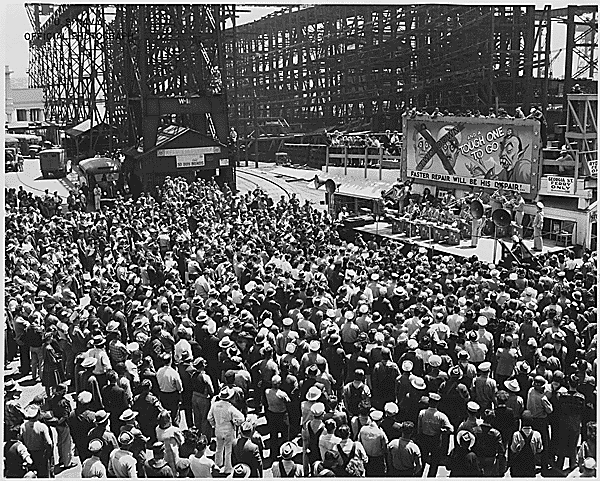
The AJC Band, from Hamilton Field, plays at a war bond rally held at Mare Island on 26 June 1945. Behind the band, caricatures of Benito Mussolini and Adolf Hitler have been crossed out and a fanged Japanese figure is labeled "Tough One To Go"

Base facilities included a hospital, ammunition depot, paint and rubber testing laboratories, and schools for firefighters, opticians, and anti-submarine attack during World War II. MINSY reached peak capacity for shipbuilding, repair, overhaul, and maintenance of many different kinds of seagoing vessels including both surface combatants and submarines. Up to 50,000 workers were employed. Mare Island even received Royal Navy cruisers and destroyers and four Soviet Navy subs for service.

Before the wartime expansion, MINSY had a usable area of about 635 acres. By 1945, MINSY more than doubled its usable area to about 1500 acres, much of which was reclaimed land at the North End. Most of the large permanent buildings were built between 1938 and 1941, before concrete and steel became restricted because of wartime demands. Shipyard South had the newest and best-built or redesigned industrial buildings for mass pre-fabricated sub-assembly production of submarines as well as the waterfront repair of battle-damaged vessels. The open North End was transformed into a new assembly plant for mass production of escort vessels and landing crafts, producing at its peak performance one destroyer escort every ten days and one landing craft each day.

Following the War, MINSY was considered to be one of the primary stations for construction and maintenance of the Navy's Pacific fleet of submarines, having built seventeen submarines and four submarine tenders by the end of hostilities.

=== War bonds ===
Patriotism and esprit de corps among the workers ran very high. Mare Island's military and civilian workforce raised almost $76M in war bonds; enough to pay for every one of the submarines built at MINSY prior to VJ Day. More than 300 landing craft were built at Mare Island.

== Dry docks and slipways ==
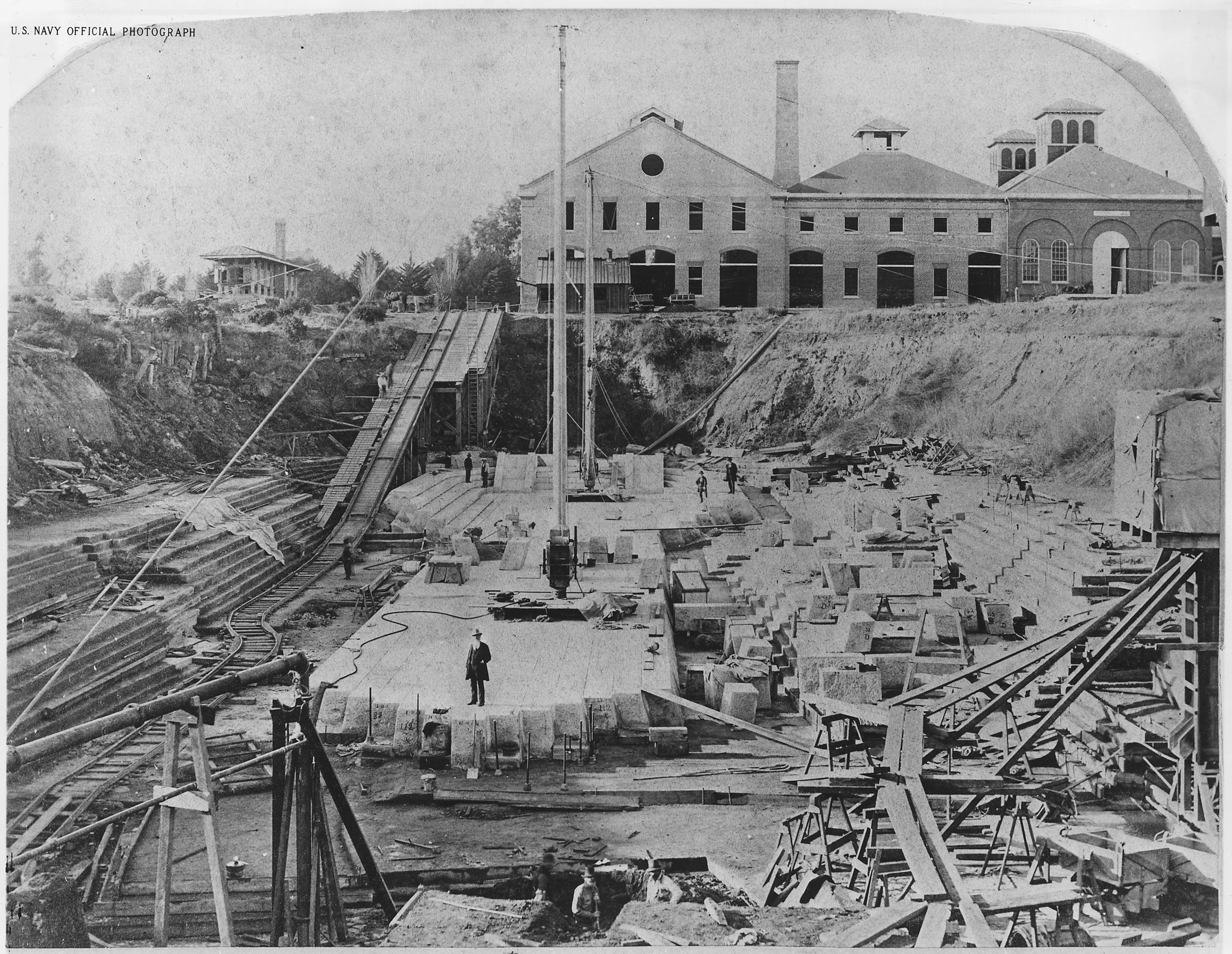
Dry Dock 1: Calvin Brown, Civil Engineer and Foreman in Charge, standing on the granite blocks (1 December 1878). Work began 1 December 1874 and finished 18 February 1891. Dry Dock 1 is Mare Island's only stone dock, the others are concrete.

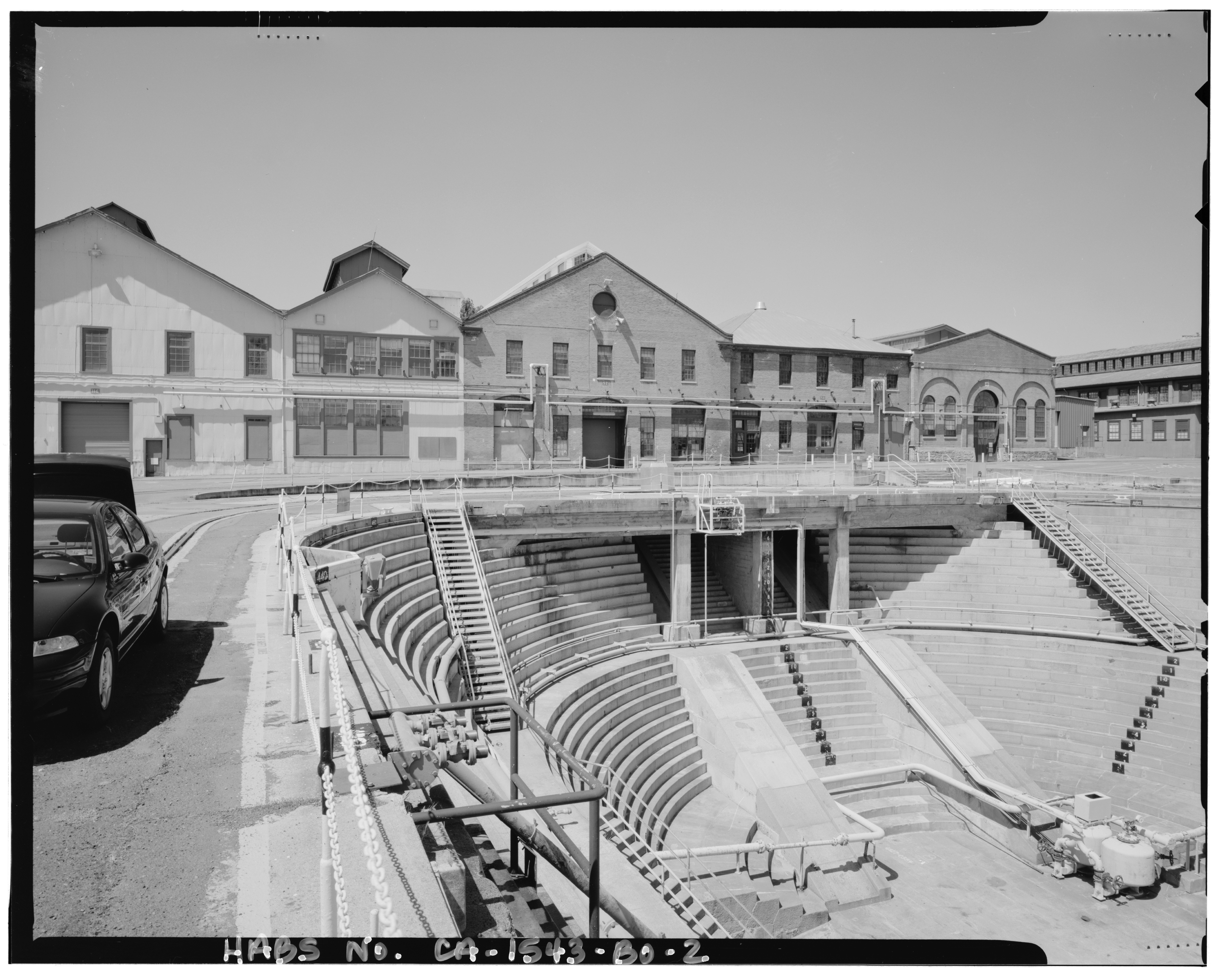
Dry Dock 1 in foreground; camera facing west (1998). Group of linked early brick shops buildings, including Building 46, the oldest of the group, and Buildings 50 and 52, form the waterfront facade immediately adjacent to the granite Dry Dock 1.

When the shipyard was commissioned in 1854, it relied on a floating dry dock for ship repair. Although the Navy intended from the outset to have a permanent dry dock at Mare Island, the funds were not available until 1872, when Congress authorized $2 million for its construction. By then, Calvin Brown took over design and construction from Daniel Turner, the first civil engineer at the base. Dry Dock 1 was designed by Brown, who prepared for it by touring facilities throughout the U.S. and Europe, and was his most enduring achievement. Dry Dock 1 was the raison d'etre of the 19th century shipyard, the most important single structure at Mare Island. It remains one of the most remarkable examples of stone masonry construction in the United States.

The first concrete foundation for Dry Dock 1 was poured in 1874 and the first granite stone was laid the next year. The granite blocks were cut at quarries at Crystal Lake, Pino, Rocklin, Folsom, and Penryn. The entire surface of Dry Dock 1 is finished in dressed granite blocks. The floor is smooth and the walls are finished in stepped blocks. Construction of Dry Dock 1 was completed in 1891, $400,000 or 20% over budget. Owing to the large increases in the size of American ships in the late 19th century, the Navy began construction of a much longer, concrete, second dry dock shortly after the completion of the historic granite Dry Dock 1.

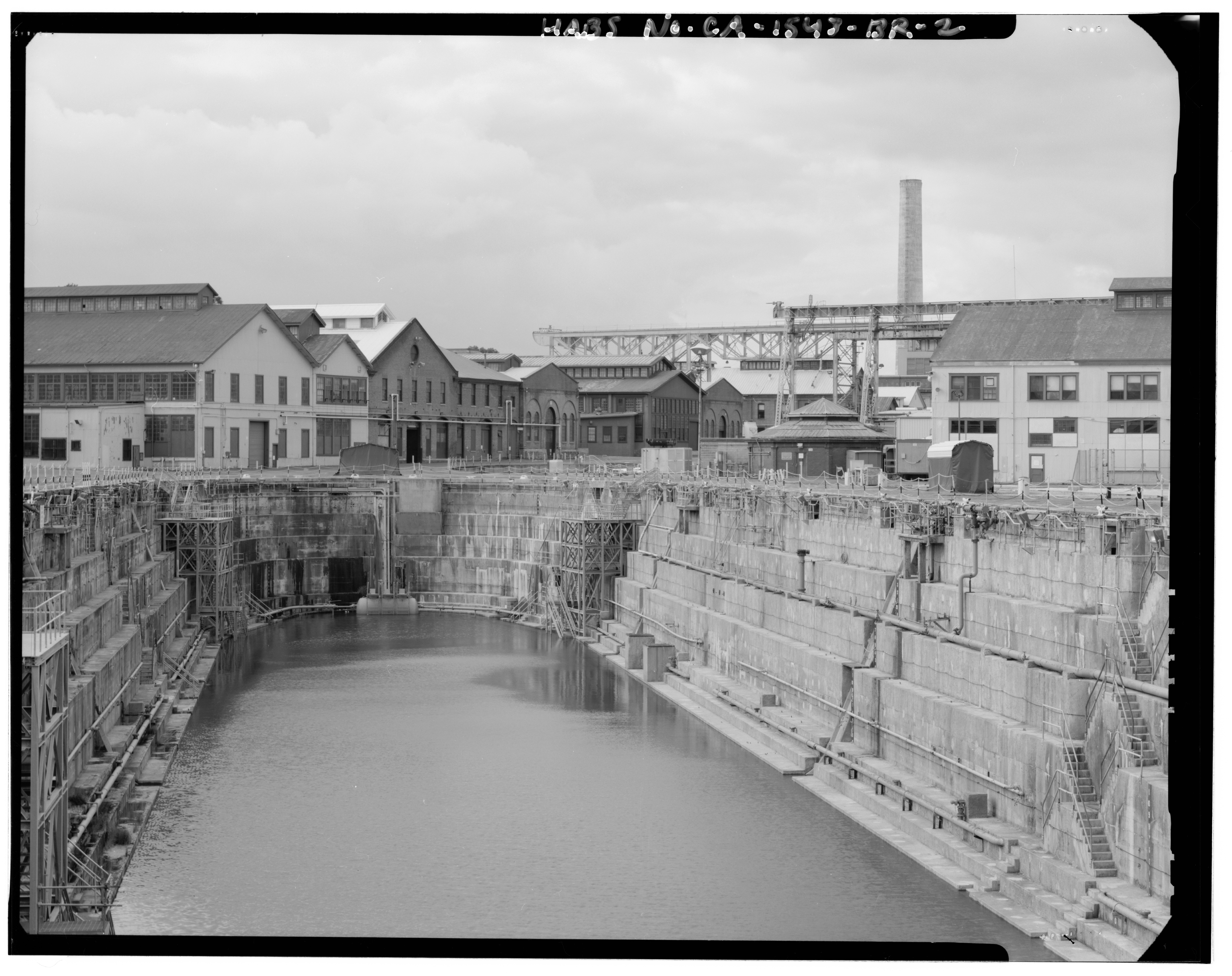
Dry Dock 2 in foreground, camera facing northwest (1998). Buildings 110, 46, 50, and 52 in background; California Avenue.

Dry Dock 2 was built between 1899 and 1910 during a period of intense modernization of Mare Island. The March 1898 Mare Island earthquake that leveled many of the unreinforced masonry structures on the base and the 1898 Spanish-American War convinced the Navy and Congress to modernize Mare Island in order to maintain a substantial fleet in the Pacific. A key element to supporting the Pacific fleet was the construction a "state-of-the-art" Dry Dock 2 that can accommodate any ship of the Navy afloat or under design. It needed to be several hundred feet longer than Dry Dock 1 and had to be built at a 45-degree angle to the shoreline, adjacent to Dry Dock 1, to avoid demolition of the older shop buildings on the waterfront. It was lined with modern hydraulic concrete, with granite masonry used only in critical areas, like its locks and upper sill. Dry Dock 2 served as the main dry dock at Mare Island for three decades, from 1910 through the 1930s. During the build-up leading to and during World War II to meet the sharply increasing demand for the shipyard's dual and competing mission of shipbuilding and ship-repairing, two more dry docks were built: Dry Dock 3, the second largest dry dock at Mare Island, and Dry Dock 4, used primarily for submarines and destroyers, both in the newer, more modernized Shipyard South area.

Dock No.	Material of which dock is constructed	Length	Width	Depth	Date Completed	Source
1	Concrete and granite	525 feet (160 m)	122 feet (37 m)	35 feet 9 inches (10.90 m)	1891	
2	Concrete	741 feet (226 m)	120 feet (37 m)	31 feet 2 inches (9.50 m)	1910	
3	Concrete	693 feet 4 inches (211.33 m)	114 feet (35 m)	35 feet 9 inches (10.90 m)	1940	
4	Concrete	435 feet 8 inches (132.79 m)	104 feet (32 m)	22 feet 8 inches (6.91 m)	1942	

Prior to the wartime expansion beginning in 1938, there were two building ways, No. 1 and 2, at Shipyard North. By the end of World War II, six new building ways had been added in two areas. Ways No. 3 was added to the redesigned Shipyard South and was used primarily for dry dock tugs, barges, and other small crafts. Ways No. 4, 5, 6, 7, and 8 were added to the newly transformed North End and were used primarily for mass production of destroyer escorts and landing crafts. The yard also increased greatly its berthing capacity; at its peak MINSY was capable of berthing and working on 100 ships at one time.

1 January 1946
Shipbuilding ways	Width	Length	Source
1	108 feet 8 inches (33.12 m)	680 feet (210 m)	
2	89 feet (27 m)	398 feet (121 m)	
2	89 feet (27 m)	308 feet (94 m)	
3	93 feet (28 m)	488 feet (149 m)	
4	96 feet (29 m)	450 feet (140 m)	
5	96 feet (29 m)	450 feet (140 m)	
6	96 feet (29 m)	450 feet (140 m)	
7	96 feet (29 m)	450 feet (140 m)	
8	96 feet (29 m)	450 feet (140 m)	

== Shipbuilding ==
Mare Island Naval Shipyard constructed at least eighty-nine seagoing vessels. Among the more important ships & boats built were:

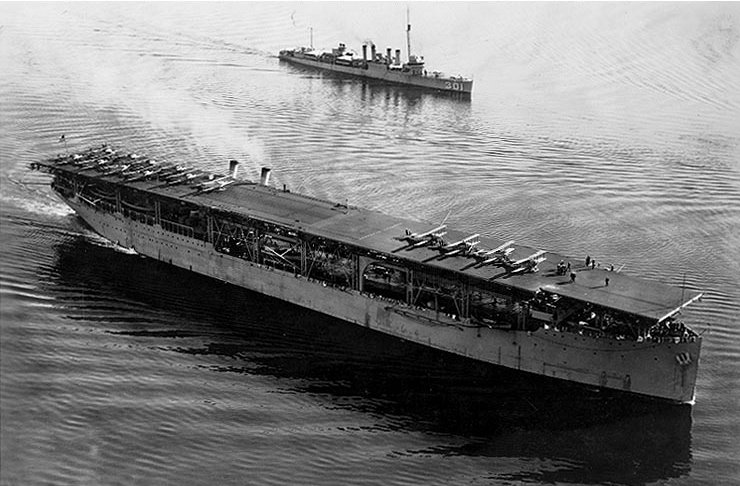
The collier USS Jupiter was later converted to become the first United States aircraft carrier, USS Langley.

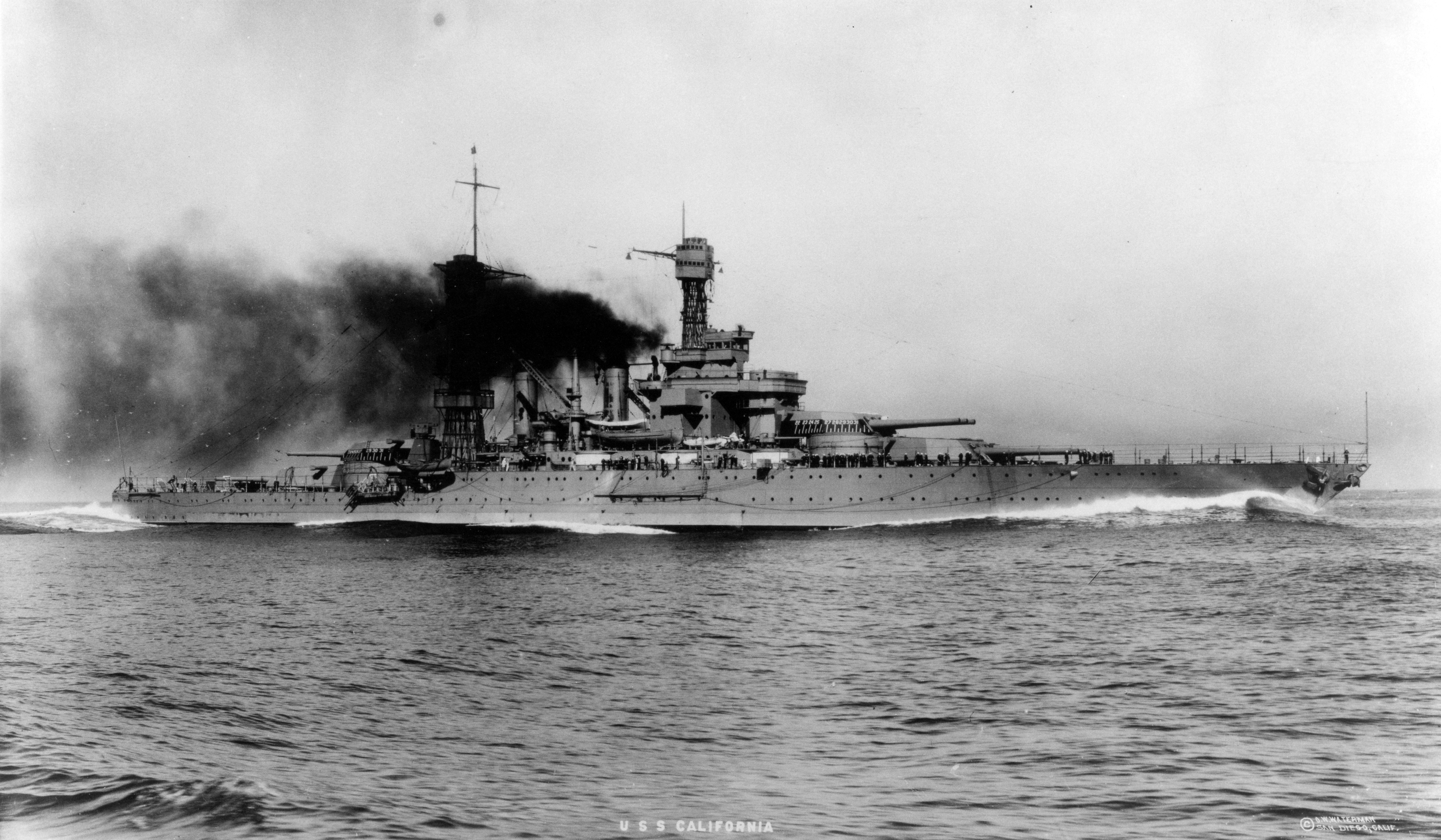
Battleship USS California

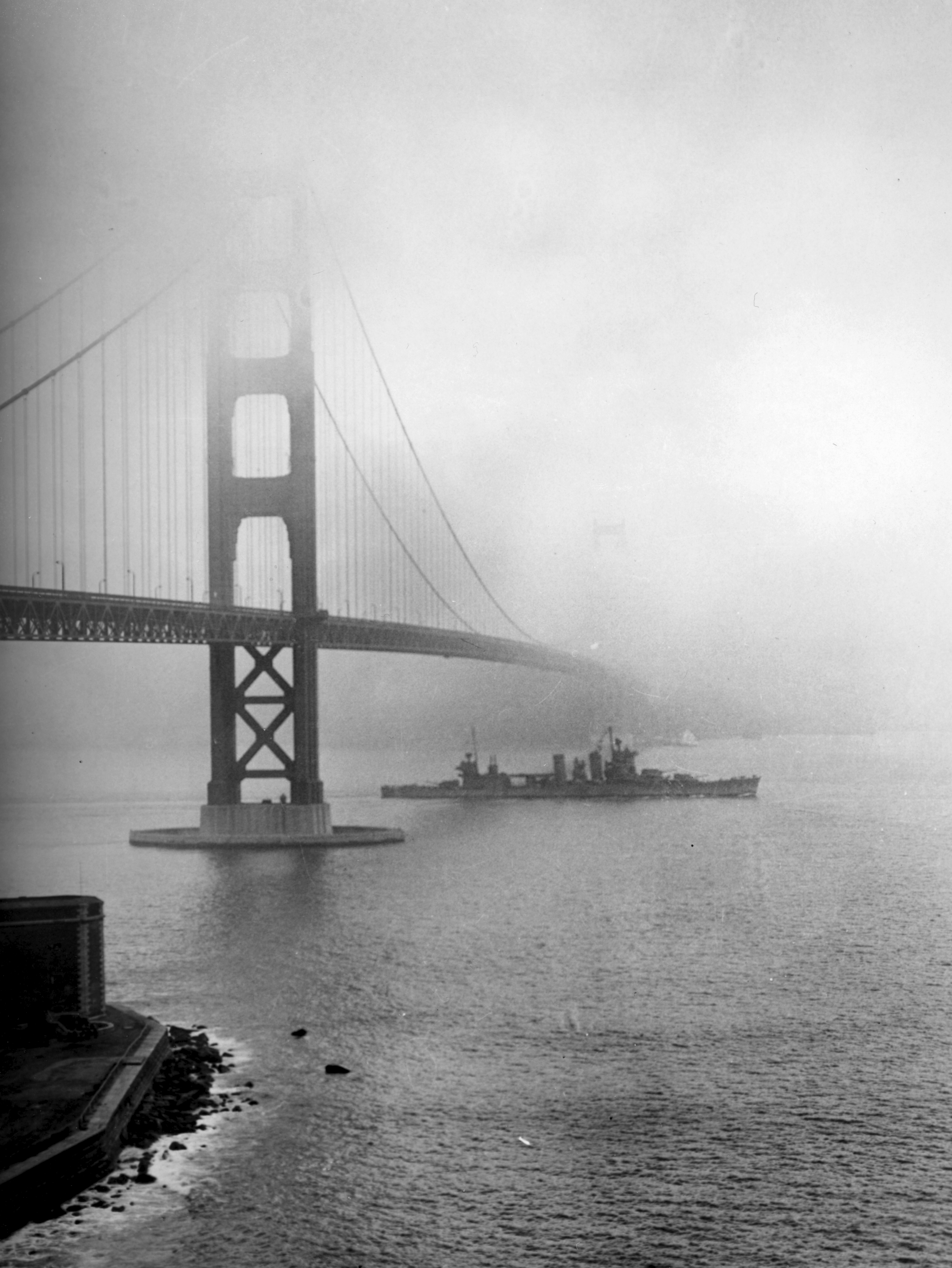
Heavy cruiser USS San Francisco

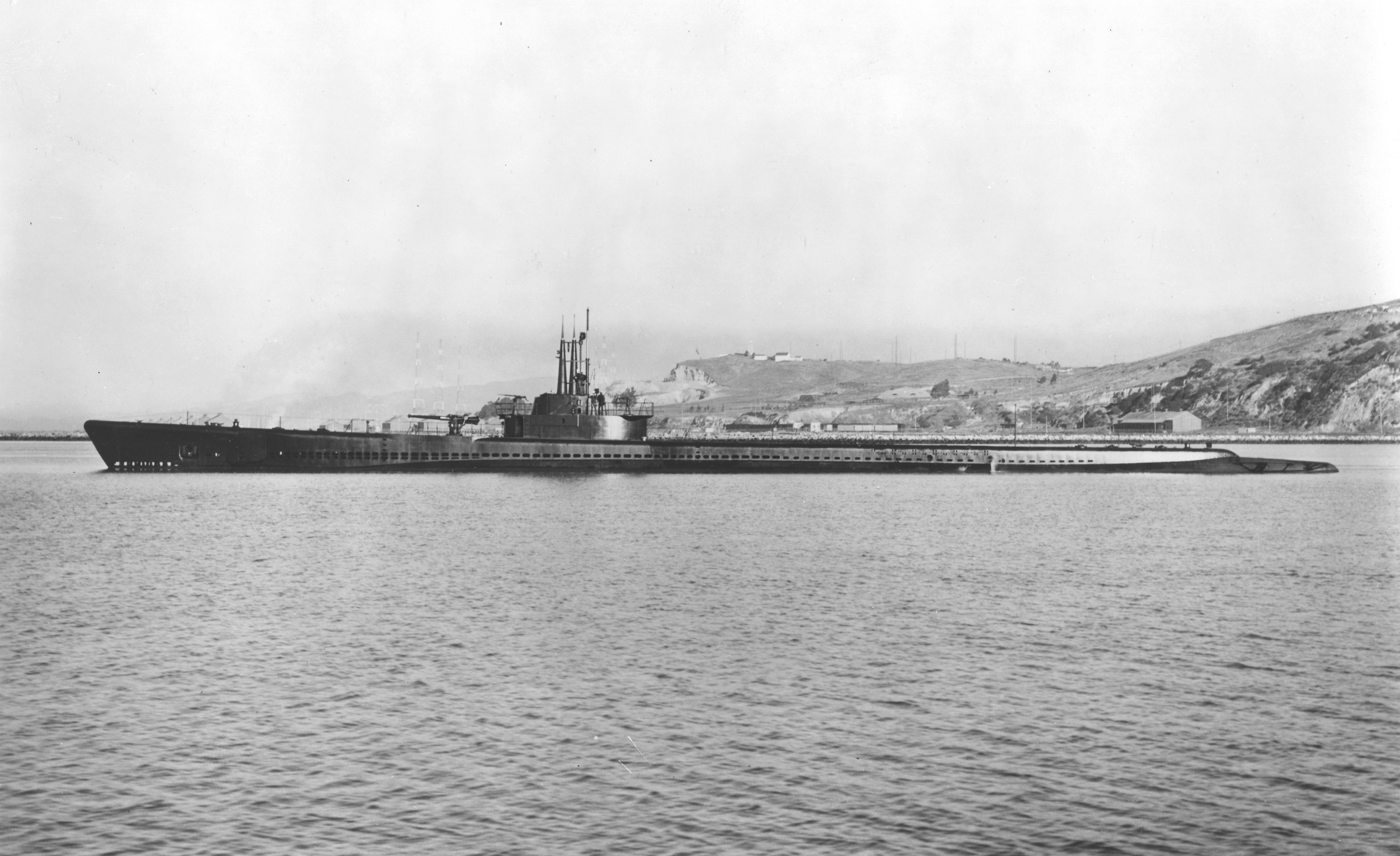
Five of the seven top-scoring United States submarines of World War II were built at Mare Island.

- 1858 USS Saginaw – sloop-of-war, wood
- 1872 USS Mohican – sloop-of-war, wood
- 1874 USC&GS McArthur – Steamer
- 1875 USS Monadnock – monitor, steel
- 1886 USRC Cosmos – Revenue Cutter, wood
- 1904 USS Intrepid – training ship, steel barque
- 1907 USS Prometheus – collier, steel
- 1911 USS Jupiter – collier, steel. Later converted to aircraft carrier USS Langley
- 1913 USS Kanawha – tanker, steel
- 1913 USRC Guard – Revenue Cutter Service harbor tug, wood
- 1913 USS Palos – gunboat, steel
- 1913 USS Monocacy – gunboat, steel
- 1914 USS Maumee – tanker, steel
- 1915 USS Cuyama – tanker, steel
- 1916 USS Shaw, destroyer – steel
- 1916 USS California – battleship, steel
- 1916 USS Caldwell – destroyer, steel
- 1917 Fifteen submarine chasers – wood
- 1917 USS Fairfax – destroyer – (Destroyers for Bases Agreement)
- 1917 USS Taylor – destroyer
- 1918 USS Boggs – destroyer – (World War II)
- 1918 USS Kilty – destroyer – (Guadalcanal campaign – Philippines campaign (1944–45) – Battle of Okinawa)
- 1919 USS Kennison – destroyer – (World War II)
- 1918 USS Ward – destroyer – (attack on Pearl Harbor – Guadalcanal campaign – Philippines campaign)
- 1918 USS Claxton – destroyer
- 1919 USS Hamilton – destroyer – (invasion of North Africa – Philippines campaign)
- 1920 USS Montana – battleship scrapped before completion under terms of the Washington Naval Treaty
- 1920 USS Litchfield – destroyer – (World War II)
- 1920 USS Zane – destroyer – (attack on Pearl Harbor – Guadalcanal campaign)
- 1921 USS Wasmuth – destroyer – (attack on Pearl Harbor)
- 1922 USS Trever – destroyer – (attack on Pearl Harbor – Guadalcanal campaign)
- 1922 USS Perry – destroyer – (attack on Pearl Harbor – Battle of Peleliu)
- 1922 USS Decatur – destroyer – (World War II)
- 1927 USS Nautilus – submarine (sank 6 ships in 14 World War II Pacific patrols)
- 1 of 6 Northampton-class heavy cruisers
  - 1928 USS Chicago – (Battle of Savo Island – Battle of Rennell Island)
- 1 of 7 New Orleans-class heavy cruisers
  - 1931 USS San Francisco – (attack on Pearl Harbor – Battle of Cape Esperance – Naval Battle of Guadalcanal – Battle of the Philippine Sea – Philippines campaign (1944–45) – Battle of Okinawa)
- 2 of 18 Mahan-class destroyers
  - 1934 USS Smith – (Battle of the Santa Cruz Islands – Philippines campaign)
  - 1934 USS Preston – (Battle of the Santa Cruz Islands – Naval Battle of Guadalcanal)
- 1 of 8 Bagley-class destroyers
  - 1935 USS Henley – (attack on Pearl Harbor – Guadalcanal campaign)
- 31 of 65 Evarts-class destroyer escorts
  - 1942 USS Brennan (DE-13)
  - ...
  - 1943 USS Manlove (DE-36)
  - 1943 USS Lake (DE-301)
  - ...
  - 1944 USS Finnegan (DE-307)

With the prelude to, and the outbreak of World War II, the Mare Island Naval Shipyard specialized in submarines, and other than a few submarine tenders and destroyer escorts, no more surface ships were built there. MINSY continued building non-nuclear subs through the Cold War including two of the three Barracuda-class submarines and USS Grayback, an early guided missile launcher. In 1955, Mare Island was awarded the contract to build Sargo, the first nuclear submarine laid down at a Pacific base.

The shipyard became one of the few that built and overhauled nuclear submarines, including several UGM-27 Polaris submarines. 1970 saw the launching of Drum, the last nuclear submarine built in California. In 1972, the Navy officially ceased building new nuclear submarines at Mare Island, though overhaul of existing vessels continued. Nautilus was decommissioned at Mare Island in 1980, then rigged for towing back to Groton, Connecticut, to serve as a museum of naval history.

- 1 of 10 United States Porpoise-class submarines
  - 1936 USS Pompano – sank 6 ships in 7 World War II Pacific patrols
- 1 of 6 Salmon-class submarines
  - 1936 USS Sturgeon – sank 9 ships in 11 World War II Pacific patrols
- 1 of 10 Sargo-class submarines
  - 1937 USS Swordfish – sank 12 ships in 13 World War II Pacific patrols
- 1939 USS Fulton – submarine tender – (World War II)
- 2 of 12 Tambor-class submarines
  - 1939 USS Tuna – sank 4 ships in 13 World War II Pacific patrols
  - 1939 USS Gudgeon – sank 11 ships in 12 World War II Pacific patrols
- 1941 USS Sperry – submarine tender – (World War II)
- 1942 USS Bushnell – submarine tender – (World War II)
- 8 of 77 Gato-class submarines
  - 1941 USS Silversides – (sank 23 ships in 14 World War II Pacific patrols (3rd highest number for a U.S. submarine)
  - 1941 USS Trigger – (sank 18 ships in 12 World War II Pacific patrols (11th highest number for a U.S. submarine)
  - 1942 USS Wahoo – (sank 20 ships in 7 World War II Pacific patrols (6th highest number for a U.S. submarine)
  - 1942 USS Whale – (sank 9 ships in 11 World War II Pacific patrols
  - 1942 USS Sunfish – (sank 15 ships in 11 World War II Pacific patrols
  - 1942 USS Tunny – (sank 7 ships in 9 World War II Pacific patrols Vietnam War)
  - 1942 USS Tinosa – submarine (sank 16 ships in 11 World War II Pacific patrols
  - 1942 USS Tullibee – (sank 3 ships 4 World War II Pacific patrols
- 1943 USS Howard W. Gilmore – submarine tender – (World War II)
- 10 of 120 Balao-class submarines
  - 1943 USS Seahorse – (sank 20 ships in 8 World War II Pacific patrols (6th highest number for a U.S. submarine)
  - 1943 USS Skate – (sank 10 ships in 7 World War II Pacific patrols
  - 1943 USS Tang – (sank 24 ships in 5 World War II Pacific patrols (highest number for a U.S. submarine)
  - 1943 USS Tilefish – (sank 2 ships 6 World War II Pacific patrols
  - 1944 USS Spadefish – (sank 21 ships in 5 World War II Pacific patrols (4th highest number for a U.S. submarine)
  - 1944 USS Trepang – (sank 11 ships in 5 World War II Pacific patrols
  - 1944 USS Spot – (sank 1 ship in 3 World War II Pacific patrols
  - 1944 USS Springer – (sank 4 ships in 3 World War II Pacific patrols
  - 1945 USS Stickleback – (1 World War II Pacific patrol)
  - 1947 USS Tiru –
- 1945 USS Nereus – submarine tender
- 2 of 3 United States Barracuda-class submarines
  - 1951 USS Bass
  - 1951 USS Bonita
- 1 of 2 Grayback-class submarines
  - 1957 USS Grayback –

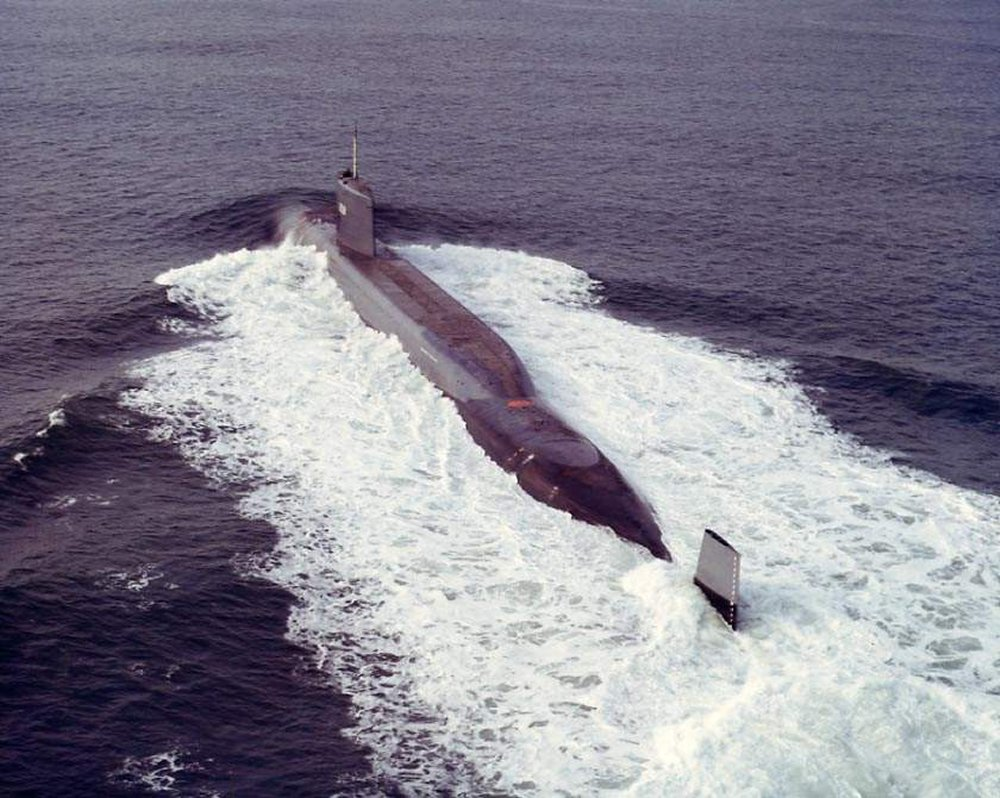
UGM-27 Polaris ballistic missile submarine USS Mariano G. Vallejo

- 1957 USS Sargo – submarine (nuclear powered)
- 1959 USS Halibut – submarine (nuclear powered)
- 1959 USS Theodore Roosevelt – submarine (nuclear powered)
- 1960 USS Scamp – submarine (nuclear powered)
- 1961 USS Permit – submarine (nuclear powered)
- 1961 USS Plunger – submarine (nuclear powered)
- 1962 USS Andrew Jackson – submarine (nuclear powered)
- 1963 USS Woodrow Wilson – submarine (nuclear powered)
- 1963 USS Daniel Boone – submarine (nuclear powered)
- 1963 USS Stonewall Jackson – submarine (nuclear powered)
- 1964 Trieste II – deep submergence bathyscaphe
- 1965 USS Kamehameha – submarine (nuclear powered)
- 1965 USS Mariano G. Vallejo - submarine (nuclear powered)
- 1967 USS Gurnard – submarine (nuclear powered)
- 1968 USS Guitarro – submarine (nuclear powered)
- 1969 USS Hawkbill – submarine (nuclear powered)
- 1969 USS Pintado – submarine (nuclear powered)
- 1970 USS Drum – submarine (nuclear powered)

=== Riverine training ===
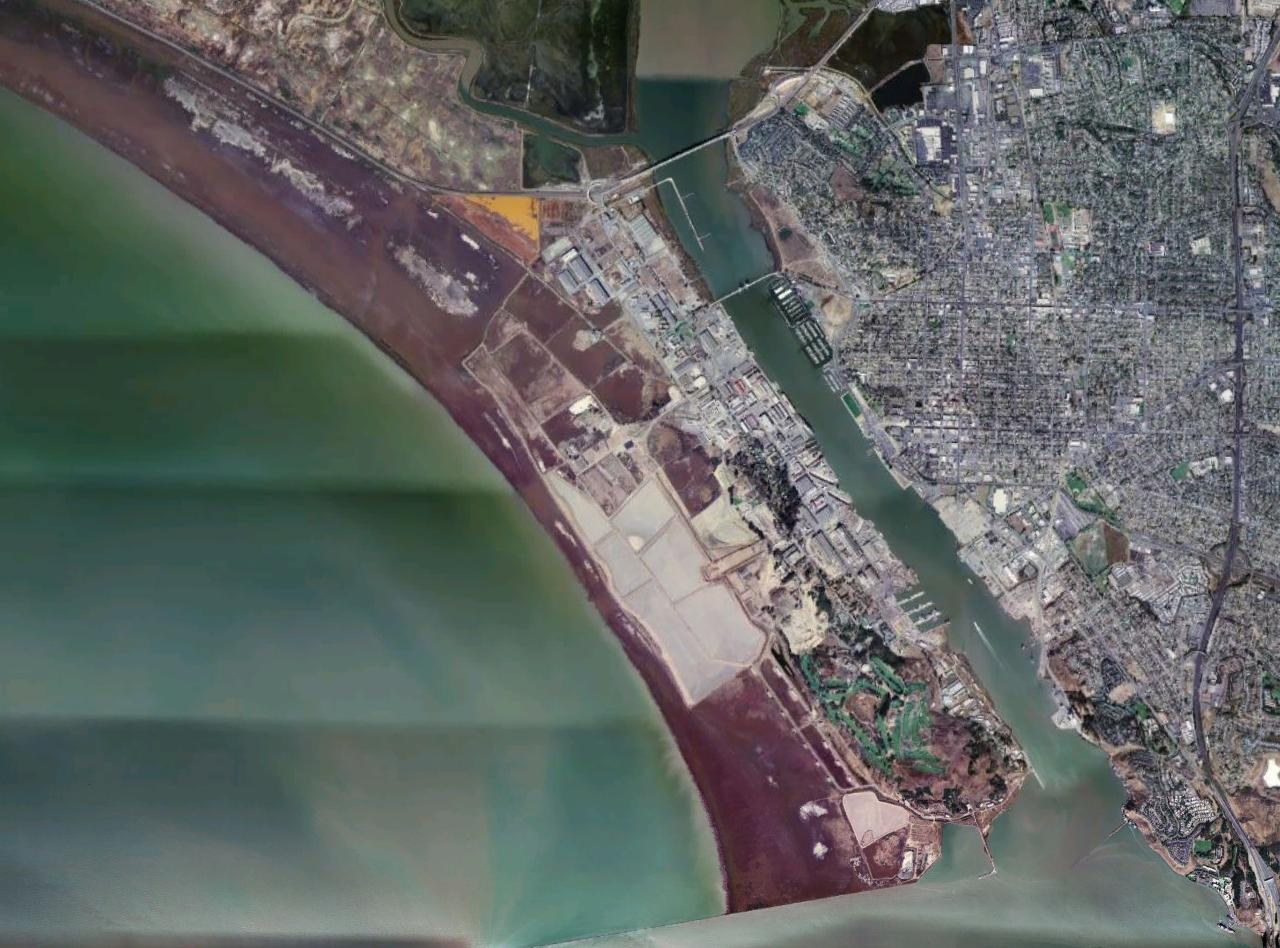
Aerial photo of southern Mare Island and the shipyard facility

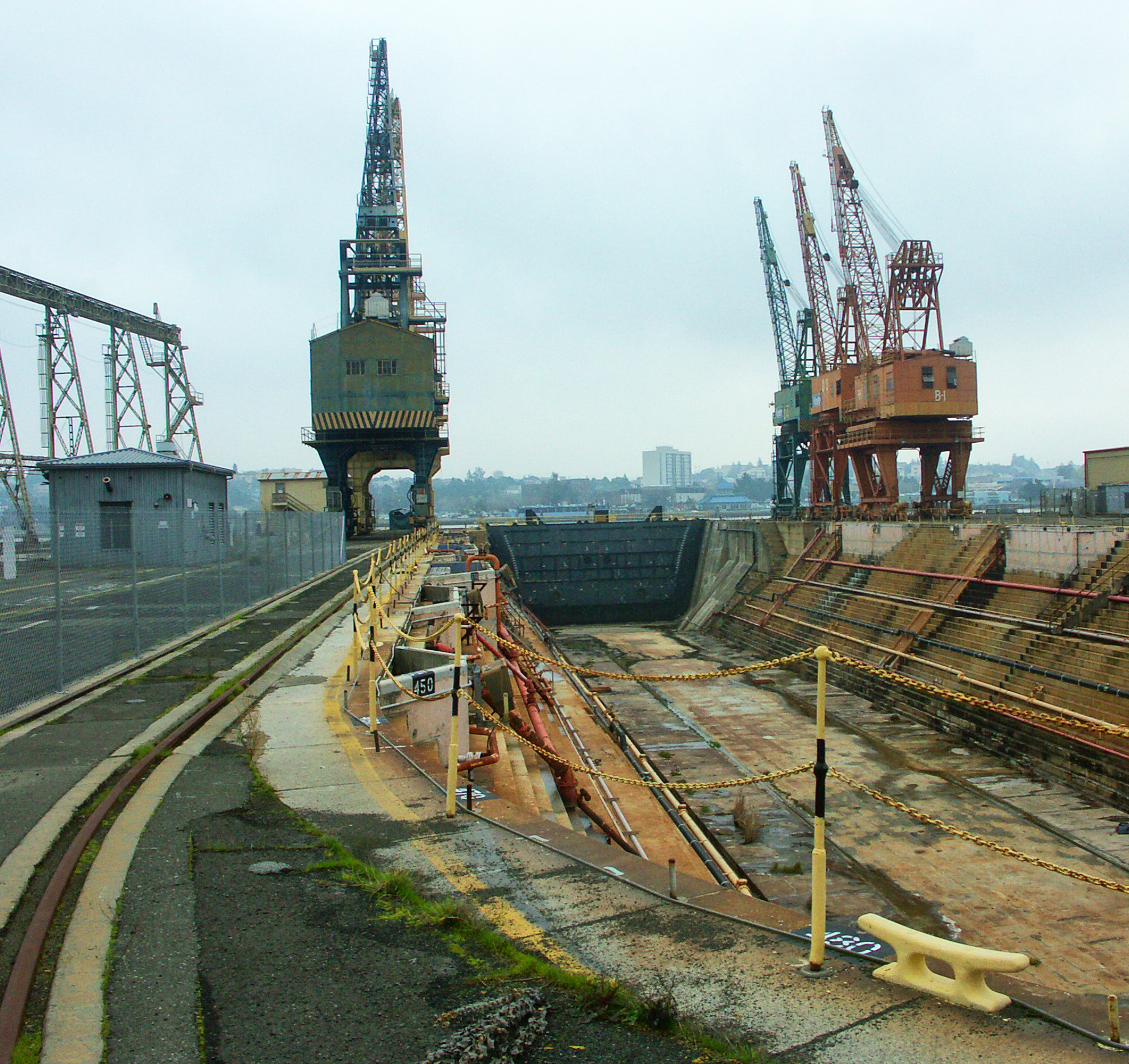
Mare Island Drydock No. 1

In 1966, during the Vietnam War, the U.S. Navy transferred their Brown Water Navy Riverine Training Operations from Coronado, California, to Mare Island. Motorists traveling along Highway 37 could often see U.S. Navy River Patrol Boats, among other river assault type boats, maneuvering through the sloughs of what is now the Napa-Sonoma State Wildlife Area, which borders the north and west portions of Mare Island.

U.S. Navy Reserve Units may still operate the slough portions of the State Wildlife Area for training purposes, as the navigable waters are considered public property. The U.S. Navy Brown Water Riverine Forces were inactivated after the Vietnam War, maintaining only the U.S. Naval Reserve PBRs and auxiliary craft at Mare Island, until the 1996 base closure.

U.S. Naval Construction Battalion Unit 421

Mare Island was also home to the Seabees CBU 421 who completed many construction projects in the bay area including renovation and restoration of St. Peter's chapel. St. Peter's is the oldest Navy Chapel in the United States built in 1901.

=== Pacific Reserve Fleet, Mare Island ===
Pacific Reserve Fleet, Mare Island was a large US reserve fleet that opened in 1946 to store the many surplus ships after World War II. As part of the United States Navy reserve fleets, the fleet "mothballed" ships and submarines. Some ships in the fleet were reactivated for the Korean War and Vietnam War. The Reserve Fleet closed in 1996 with the shipyard. The ships were scrapped or moved to other reserve fleets.

== Base closure ==
Mare Island Naval Shipyard expanded to over 5,200 acres (2,104 ha) during its service life and was responsible for construction of over 500 naval vessels and overhauling thousands of other vessels. Though it remained a strong contender for continued operations, MINSY was identified for closure during the Base Realignment and Closure (BRAC) process of 1993. Naval operations ceased and the facility was decommissioned on 31 March 1996.

The California Conservation Corps, Touro University California, and numerous commercial and industrial businesses are currently leasing property aboard the former naval shipyard. In May 2000, the Navy completed the transfer of a former housing area called Roosevelt Terrace using an "economic development conveyance"; a method to accelerate the transfer of BRAC facilities back to civilian communities for their economic benefit. The Navy is also transferring property at the shipyard to other government agencies such as Fish and Wildlife Service refuge, a Forest Service office building, an Army Reserve Center, a Coast Guard communications facility, and a Department of Education school.

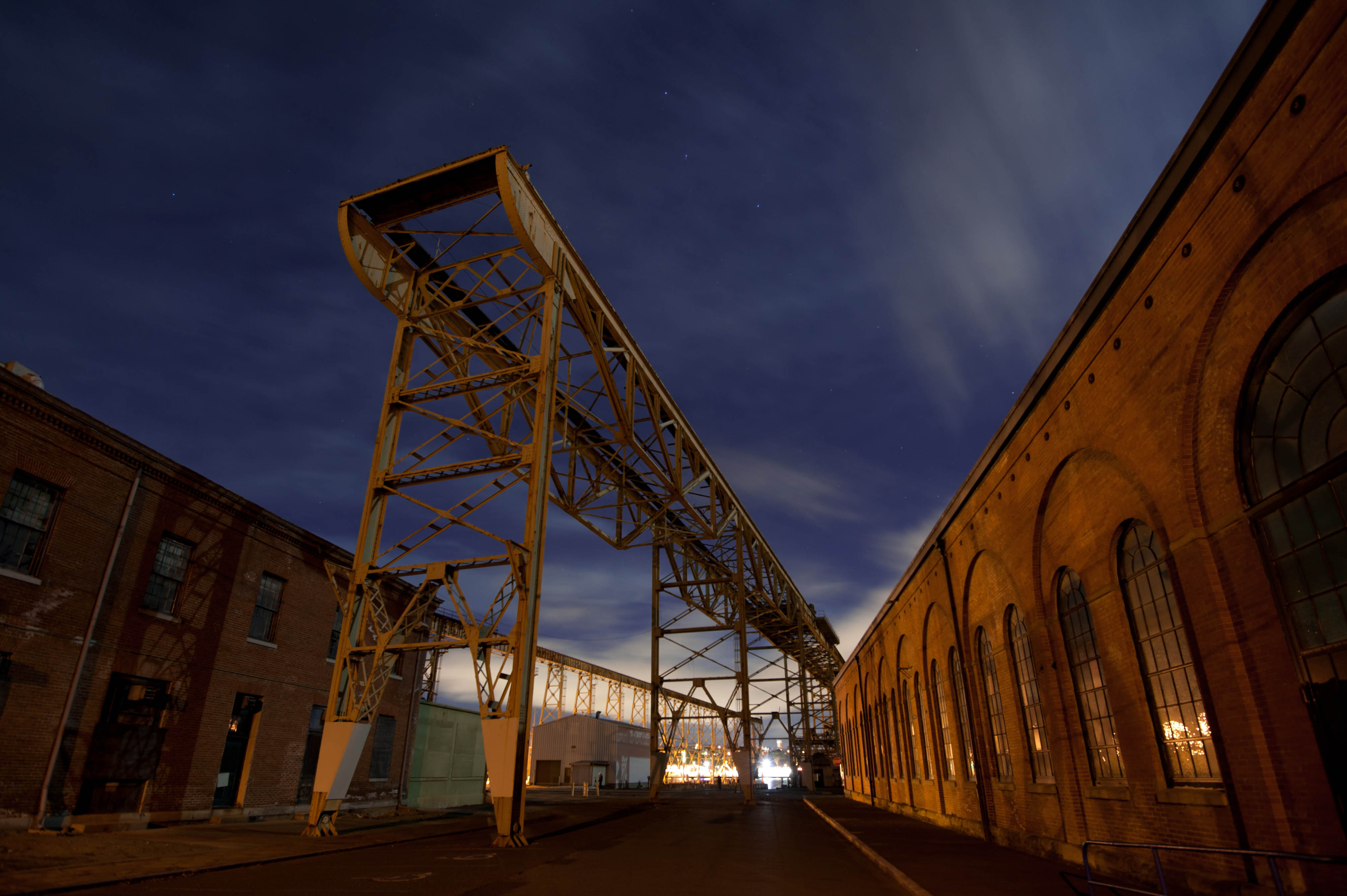
Entrance to The Mare Island Naval Shipyard Industrial Area, April 2011

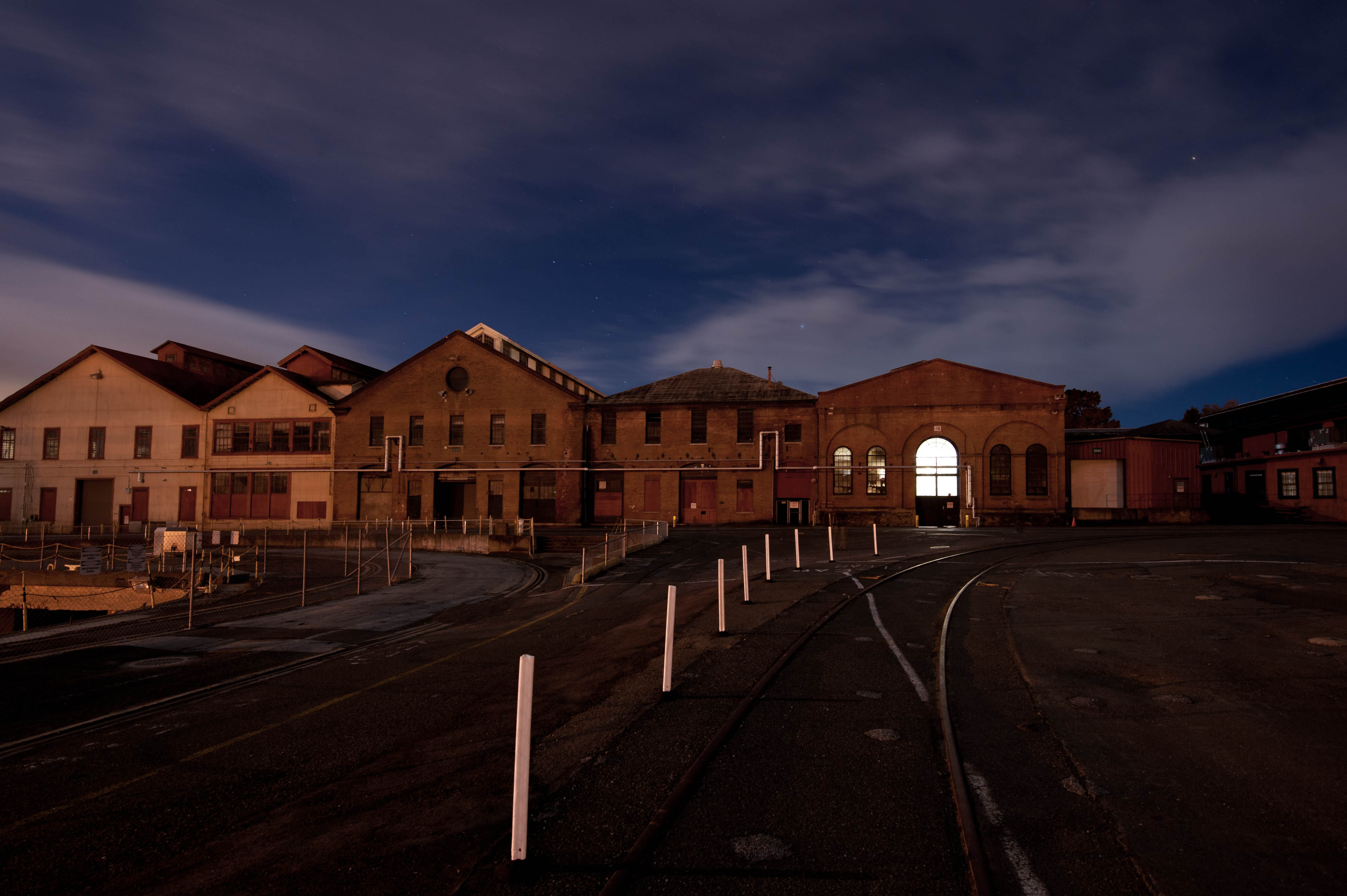
The Mare Island Naval Shipyard facility, April 2011

== Appearances in popular culture ==
The shipyard was featured by Huell Howser in California's Gold Episode 704.

The Netflix hit series "Thirteen Reasons Why" filmed in various locations of the city. Filming locations included Georgia Street in Downtown Vallejo, Virginia Street specifically Monet’s Cafe, and sound stages on Mare Island. https://www.visitvallejo.com/film-office/13-reasons-why-film-locations-in-vallejo-ca

Scenes from the 1997 action comedy film Metro were filmed at Mare Island in the Machine Shop (Bldg. 680) and in the dry dock area.

Scenes from the 2018 science fiction film Bumblebee were filmed in the industrial section of Mare Island, most notably the dry dock slipways.

In 2015 FIAT shot an automobile commercial along the industrial waterside, including a chase scene on the old coal shed loading platform.

== See also ==
- Mare Island
- Mare Island Naval Shipyard Airfield
- Rosie the Riveter/World War II Home Front National Historical Park
- California during World War II
- California Historical Landmarks in Solano County
