= Hull number =

Serial identification number given to a boat or ship

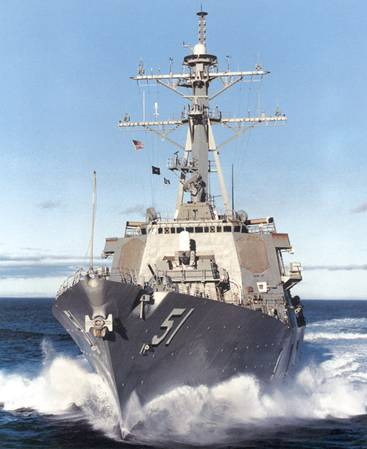
The hull number visible on both sides of the bow of USS Arleigh Burke, DDG-51

A hull number is a serial identification number given to a boat or ship. For the military, a lower number implies an older vessel. For civilian use, the Hull Identification Number (HIN) is used to trace the boat's history. The precise usage varies by country and type.

== United States usage ==
=== Civilian use ===
For civilian craft manufactured in the United States, the hull number is given to the vessel when it is built and forms part of the hull identification number, which uniquely identifies the vessel and must be permanently affixed to the hull in at least two places. A Hull Identification Number (HIN) is a unique set of 12 characters, similar to the Vehicle Identification Number which is found on automobiles. In 1972, The United States Coast Guard was asked to create a standardized format for HINs to allow for better tracking of accidents and history of boats. This HIN format is as follows: The first three characters consist of the Manufacturers Index Code (MIC) and should only be letters. The following five characters are the unique serial number assigned by the Manufacturer, and can be a series of letters and/or numbers with the exception of the letters O, I, and Q (they can be easily mistaken). The last four characters determine the model and certification year of the boat. The HIN may be found on the aft of the vessel in the uppermost right corner. Also, the HIN may be stated on the title, registration, and insurance documents.

=== United States military ===
The United States Navy, United States Coast Guard, and United States National Oceanic and Atmospheric Administration employ hull numbers in conjunction with a hull classification symbol to uniquely identify vessels and to aid identification. A particular combination of hull classification and hull number is never reused and therefore provides a means to uniquely identify a particular ship. For example, there have been at least eight vessels named USS Enterprise, but CV-6 uniquely identifies the World War II aircraft carrier from all others. For convenience, the combined designation, which is painted on the sides of the hulls, is frequently called the "hull number".

The official Navy Style Guide says that hull numbers do not include hyphens.

The U.S. Navy sometimes ignores the sequence of hull numbering. For example, the Navy built the last Los Angeles-class nuclear submarine as Cheyenne (SSN-773). Next the Navy built the three Seawolf-class submarines SSN-21 through SSN-23. Then the Navy later resumed the original sequence of hull numbers with USS Virginia (SSN-774) for its next class of nuclear attack submarines.

This change in numbering was done because the Seawolf class was to have a radical new and large design for the continuation of the Cold War into the 21st century, but cost overruns combined with the end of the Cold War, and the resulting reduction of the Navy's construction budget resulted in only three of these boats being constructed: Seawolf (SSN-21), Connecticut (SSN-22), and Jimmy Carter (SSN-23).

Also, whenever warships are constructed in American shipyards for foreign navies, any hull numbers used to identify the ships during their construction are never reused by the U.S. Navy. For example, the Perth-class guided missile destroyers that were built for the Royal Australian Navy in Bay City, Michigan, were given the hull numbers DDG-25, DDG-26, and DDG-27; but these hull numbers were not assigned to any American destroyers after the Australian Navy had changed those to its own identification numbers. Guided-missile frigates were constructed in Portugal under military-assistance aid packages were given the hull numbers DEG 7 through 11.

When a naval vessel is modified for use as a different type of ship, it is often assigned a new hull number along with its new classification. Often the actual number remains the same while the hull classification changes. For example, a heavy cruiser (CA) that was converted into a guided missile cruiser became a CG and its number was changed. This happened with Albany (CA-123), Chicago (CA-136), and Columbus (CA-74), which became, respectively, CG-10, CG-11, and CG-12.

Also, during World War II, nine Cleveland-class light cruisers (CL) were converted to light aircraft carriers (CVL), with different numbers.

During the 1970s, the guided missile frigates that were then redesignated as guided missile cruisers had their designations changed from DLG to CG; in this case, they kept their previous numbers. Some other guided-missile frigates were redesignated as guided missile destroyers (DDG) and given new numbers.

Hull numbers have been used to identify armored tanks for the U.S. Army and the U.S. Marine Corps, and other military services, also.

== European usage ==
In Europe, ships are given a Craft Identification Number (CIN) or Hull Identification Number (HIN), standardised as EN ISO 10087:2006. The numbers are a permanent, unique, fourteen-digit alphanumeric identifier issued to all marine vessels in Europe. The numbering system is mandated by the European Recreational Craft Directive and descended from the American system. Larger vessels over 300 gross tons also receive a permanent international IMO ship identification number, and European vessels over 20 metres receive a permanent ENI number.

An example CID/HIN might appear as "GB-ABC00042-A8-99", where "GB" is the ISO 3166-1 country code, "ABC" would be the Acme Boat Company's Manufacturer Identity Code (MIC); "00042" would be the forty-second hull constructed by the organization; "A8" would be January 1998 for the date keel was laid to the nearest month and "99" denoted as the year 1999 as the particular model year. Months are denoted from A…L for January…December.

In the United Kingdom, the British Marine Federation manage the issuing of Manufacturer Identity Code on behalf of the British Department for Business Innovation and Skills. Amateur boat builders in the United Kingdom may apply for one-off HIN from the Royal Yacht Association who will issue one number from their "GB-RYAxxxxx" range.

=== Russia ===
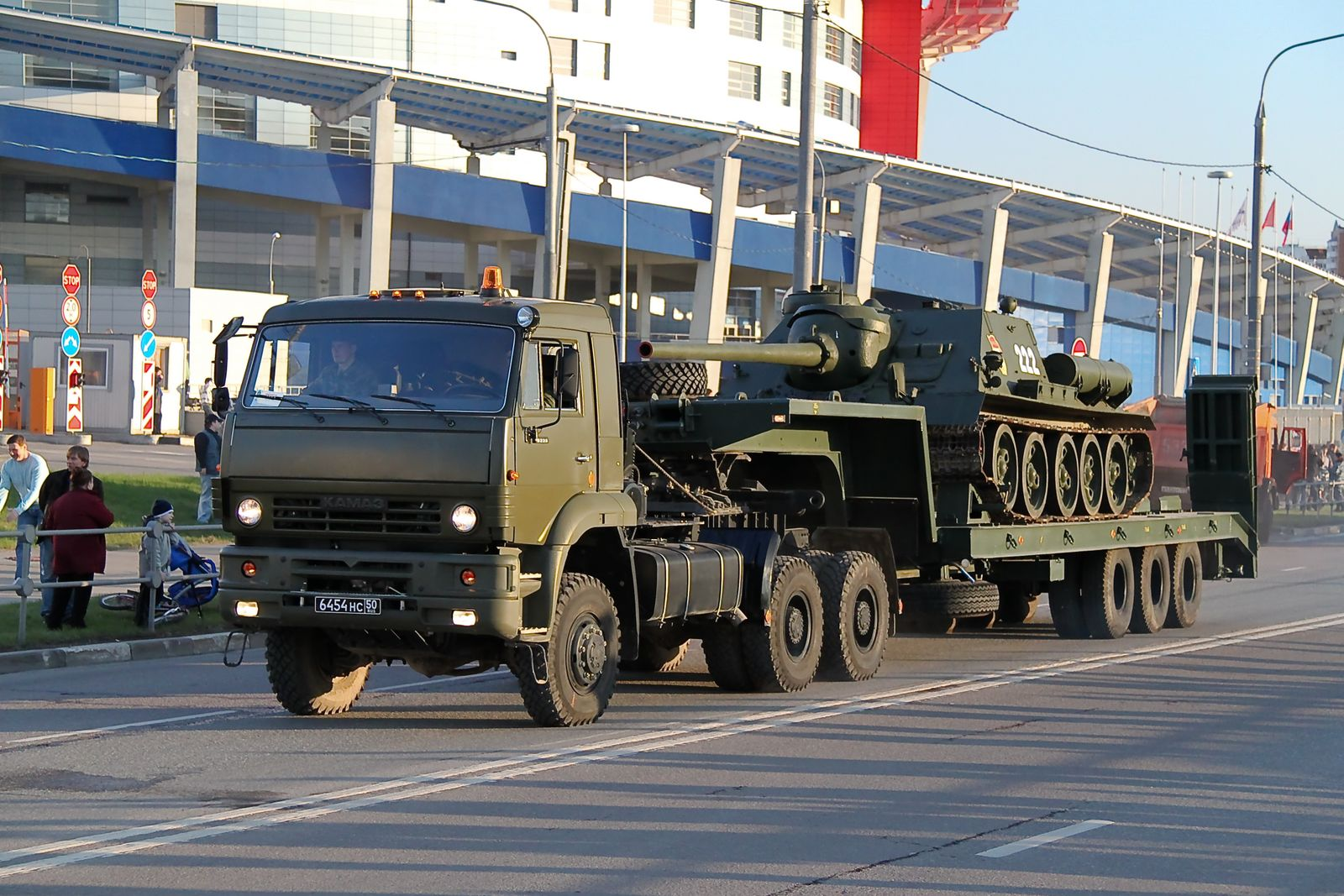
Russian SU-85 with a hull number 222

The hull number in Russian is known as bortovoi nomer. During the 2014 Russian invasion of Ukraine all hull numbers were painted over to conceal presence of the Russian regular army troops in Ukraine.

== See also ==
- Pennant number
- Tail number
