= S6W reactor =

US Navy nuclear reactor

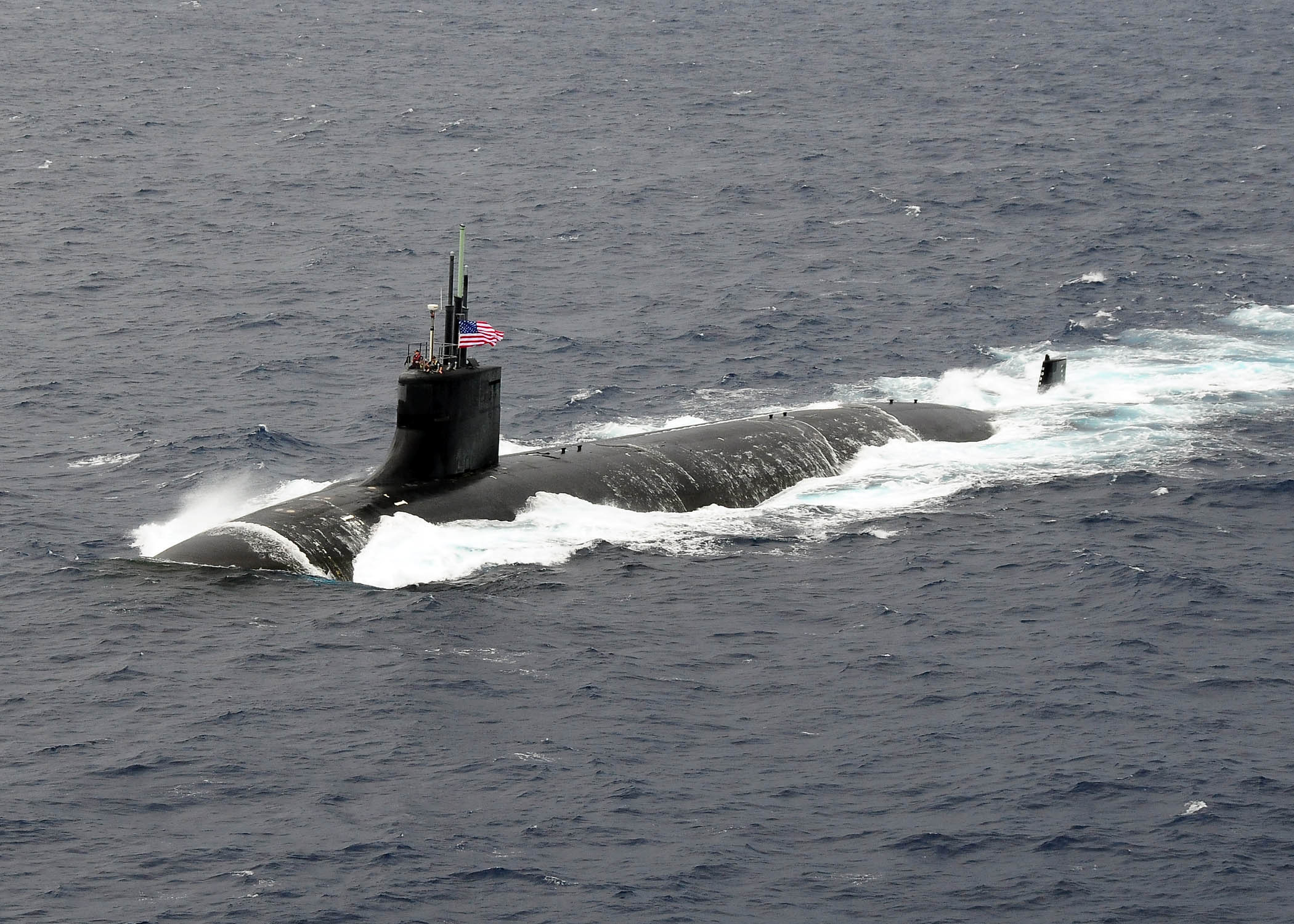
USS Connecticut (SSN-22)

The S6W reactor is a naval reactor used by the United States Navy to provide electricity generation and propulsion on warships. The S6W designation stands for:

- S, Submarine platform
- 6, Sixth generation core designed by the contractor
- W, Westinghouse was the contracted designer

== History ==
This pressurized water reactor was prototyped in the land-based S8G plant at Knolls Atomic Power Laboratory's Kesselring Site in West Milton, NY starting in March 1994.

The three ships of the Seawolf-class submarine USS Seawolf (SSN-21), USS Connecticut (SSN-22), and USS Jimmy Carter (SSN-23) submarines were built with S6W reactors.

== Design ==
The S6W has a thermal power output of 220 MW (300,000 hp) and a shaft power output of 43 MW (57,000 shp) through 2 steam turbines. It is believed to be able to utilize natural circulation at a large fraction of its full power without coolant pumps, which greatly reduces noise.
