= Naval Base Kitsap =

U.S. base in Washington state

Kitsap
- Near Bremerton, Washington in the United States
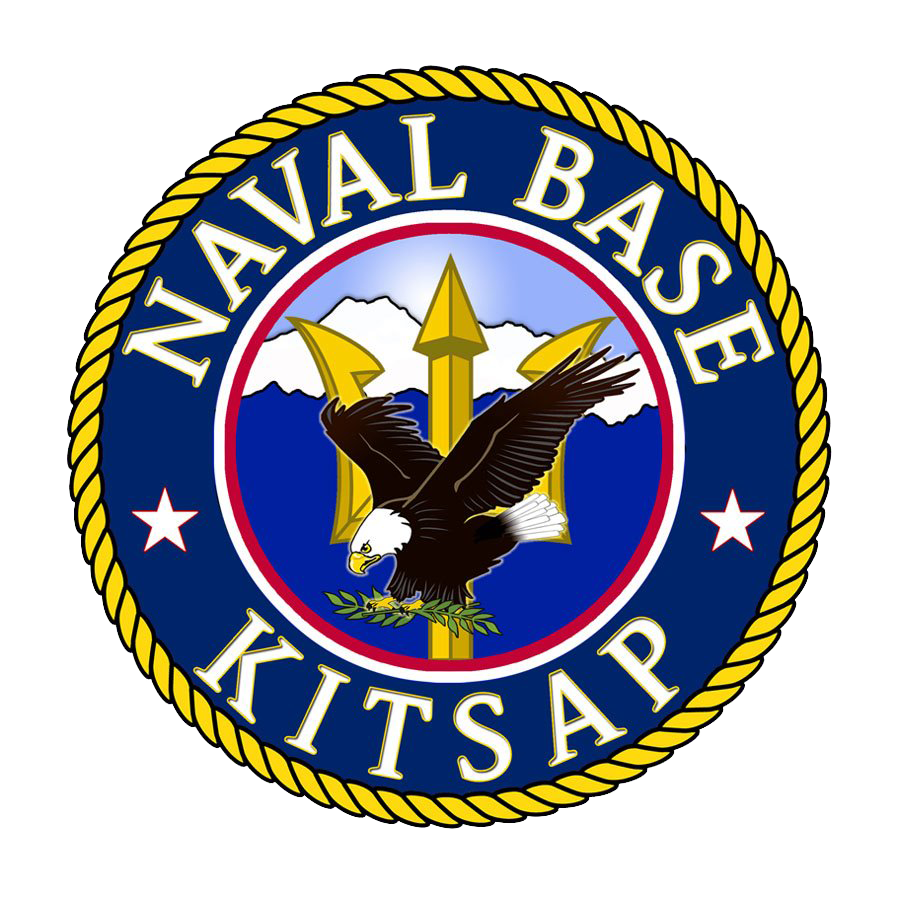

Site information
- Type: Naval base
- Owner: Department of Defense
- Operator: US Navy
- Controlled by: Navy Region Northwest
- Condition: Operational
- Website: Official website

Location
- Location within Washington (state) Location within the United States
- Coordinates: 47°43′14″N 122°42′47″W
- Area: 12,000 acres (4,900 ha)

Site history
- Built: 1942 (as Naval Submarine Base Bangor) and 1946 (as Naval Station Bremerton)
- In use: 2004 (as merged base)

Garrison information
- Current commander: Captain John Hale

Naval Base Kitsap is a U.S. Navy base located on the Kitsap Peninsula in Washington state, created in 2004 by merging the former Naval Station Bremerton with Naval Submarine Base Bangor. It is the home base for the Navy's fleet throughout West Puget Sound, provides base operating services, support for both surface ships and fleet ballistic missile and other nuclear submarines as one of the U.S. Navy's four nuclear shipyards, one of two strategic nuclear weapons facilities, and the only West Coast dry dock capable of handling a Nimitz-class aircraft carrier and the Navy's largest fuel depot. Naval Base Kitsap is the third-largest Navy base in the U.S. The base has a workforce of 15,601 active duty personnel.

It also provides service, programs, and facilities for their hosted combat commands, tenant activities, ships' crews, and civilian employees. It is the largest naval organization in Navy Region Northwest, and composed of installations at Bremerton, Bangor, Indian Island, Manchester, and Keyport, Washington. It received the 2005 and 2017 Commander in Chief's Award for Installation Excellence - the Best Base in the U.S. Navy.

== History ==
=== Bangor ===
Serving the U.S. Pacific Fleet, this base is one of only two such Trident submarine bases operated by the U.S. Navy: the base at Kings Bay, Georgia, used by the U.S. Atlantic Fleet, is the other. Nearby is Strategic Weapons Facility Pacific (SWFPAC), where submarine-launched ballistic missiles are stored and maintained.

=== Bremerton ===
This installation is home to the Puget Sound Naval Shipyard and Intermediate Maintenance Facility. In addition to performing drydock and overhaul services for active naval vessels, it is also home to an inactive ship facility for several decommissioned warships, including aircraft carriers.

Naval Base Kitsap is also home to Naval Hospital Bremerton.

=== Protest ===
In November 2009, five protesters, including 82-year-old priest William J. Bichsel, S.J., cut through two fences to reach an area near where nuclear warheads are stored in bunkers. The protesters put up banners, sprinkled blood on the ground, scattered sunflower seeds and prayed until they were arrested; all faced prison sentences. Bichsel was released from federal prison on February 9, 2012.

== Environment ==
In 2010, after purchasing the base's first hybrid bus on April 29, 2010, Naval Base Kitsap purchased two additional hybrid buses, with five others to be delivered by the end of July. The diesel-electric vehicles are the Navy's first hybrids and were funded through the GSA American Recovery and Reinvestment Act (ARRA) Replacement/Exchange Program and are overseen by NAVFAC, the Navy's non-tactical vehicle program manager.

In March 2020, private water wells of homes surrounding Bangor have been found to be contaminated with PFAS; one was found to have more than 70 parts per trillion of PFAS.

== Units, warships and submarines ==
(as of February, 2023)

- Commander, Carrier Strike Group Three

=== Bangor ===
Guided missile Submarines

- USS Ohio (SSGN-726)
- USS Michigan (SSGN-727)

Ballistic missile Submarines

- USS Henry M. Jackson (SSBN-730)
- USS Alabama (SSBN-731)
- USS Nevada (SSBN-733)
- USS Kentucky (SSBN-737)
- USS Nebraska (SSBN-739)
- USS Maine (SSBN-741)
- USS Wyoming (SSBN-742)
- USS Louisiana (SSBN-743)

Fast Attack Submarines

- USS Seawolf (SSN-21)
- USS Jimmy Carter (SSN-23)

=== Bremerton ===
Aircraft Carriers

- USS Nimitz (CVN-68)
- USS Ronald Reagan (CVN-76)

Fast Attack Submarines

- USS Connecticut (SSN-22)
- USS Chicago (SSN-721)
- USS Key West (SSN-722)
- USS San Juan (SSN-751)

== See also ==
- United States Navy submarine bases
- World War II United States Merchant Navy
- Naval Magazine Indian Island
