= USS Connecticut (SSN-22) =

Submarine of the United States

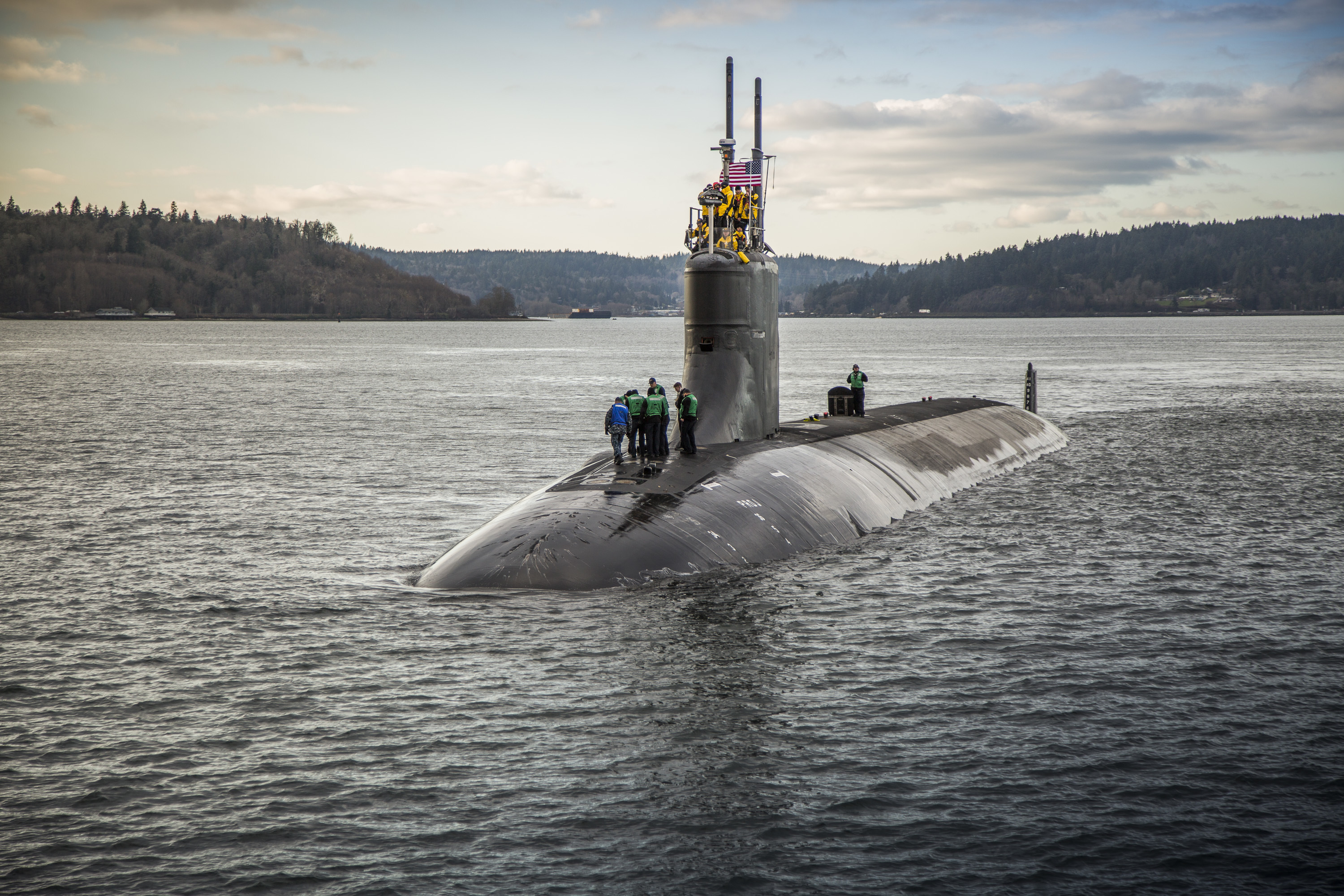
- USS Connecticut departing Puget Sound, 2016

History

United States
- Name: USS Connecticut
- Namesake: The U.S. State of Connecticut
- Ordered: 3 May 1991
- Builder: General Dynamics Electric Boat
- Laid down: 14 September 1992
- Launched: 1 September 1997
- Commissioned: 11 December 1998
- Home port: Kitsap Naval Base, Bangor, Washington
- Motto: "Arsenal of the Nation"
- Status: In commission, currently under repair since 2023
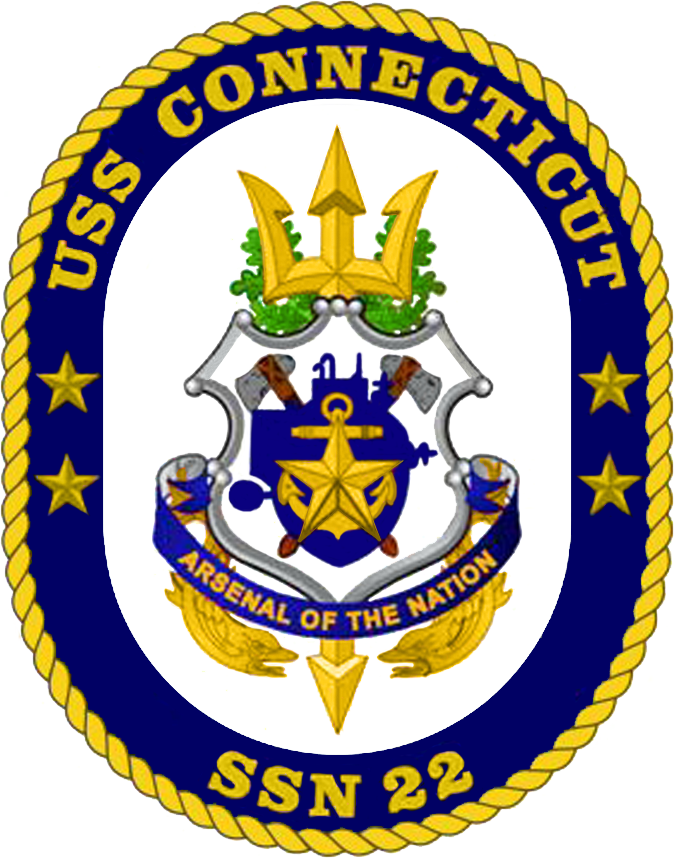
- Badge

General characteristics
- Class & type: Seawolf-class submarine
- Displacement: 7,568 tons light, 9,137 tons full, 1,569 tons dead
- Length: 107.5 meters (353 feet) overall, 107.5 meters (353 feet) waterline
- Beam: 12.1 meters (40 feet)
- Draft: 10.9 meters (36 feet)
- Propulsion: 1 S6W PWR 220 MW (300,000 hp), HEU 93.5%; 1 secondary propulsion submerged motor; 2 steam turbines 57,000 shp (43 MW); 1 shaft; 1 pump-jet propeller
- Complement: 15 officers, 101 men
- Armament: 8 × 26.5 inch torpedo tubes, sleeved for 21 inch weapons (up to 50 Tomahawk land attack missile/Harpoon anti-ship missile/Mk 48 guided torpedo carried in torpedo room)

USS Connecticut (SSN-22) is a Seawolf-class nuclear-powered, fast-attack submarine operated by the United States Navy. Connecticut is the fifth active United States Ship to be named for the U.S. state of Connecticut, going back to 1776. The contract to build her was awarded to the Electric Boat Division of General Dynamics Corporation in Groton, Connecticut, on 3 May 1991, and her keel was laid down on 14 September 1992. She was launched on 1 September 1997, sponsored by Patricia L. Rowland, wife of the governor of Connecticut, John G. Rowland, and commissioned on 11 December 1998.

== History ==
Shakedown operations in 1999 evaluated Connecticut's weapons systems, sensors, stealth, and engineering proficiency. She participated in Joint Task Force Exercise 2-99 as an opposing-force asset, and completed acoustic trials, a shallow-water exercise, and an anti-submarine warfare exercise.

In September 1999, Connecticut began a post-shakedown availability (PSA) at the Electric Boat shipyard. Despite a 100% growth in the amount of PSA work, making this the submarine force's most demanding PSA, Connecticut completed all work ahead of schedule. This PSA concluded as the safest in the 100-year history of Electric Boat.

In April 2003, Connecticut surfaced through the Arctic ice at the University of Washington's Applied Physics Laboratory Ice Station. While there, she encountered a polar bear, which gnawed on her rudder for a while before disengaging.

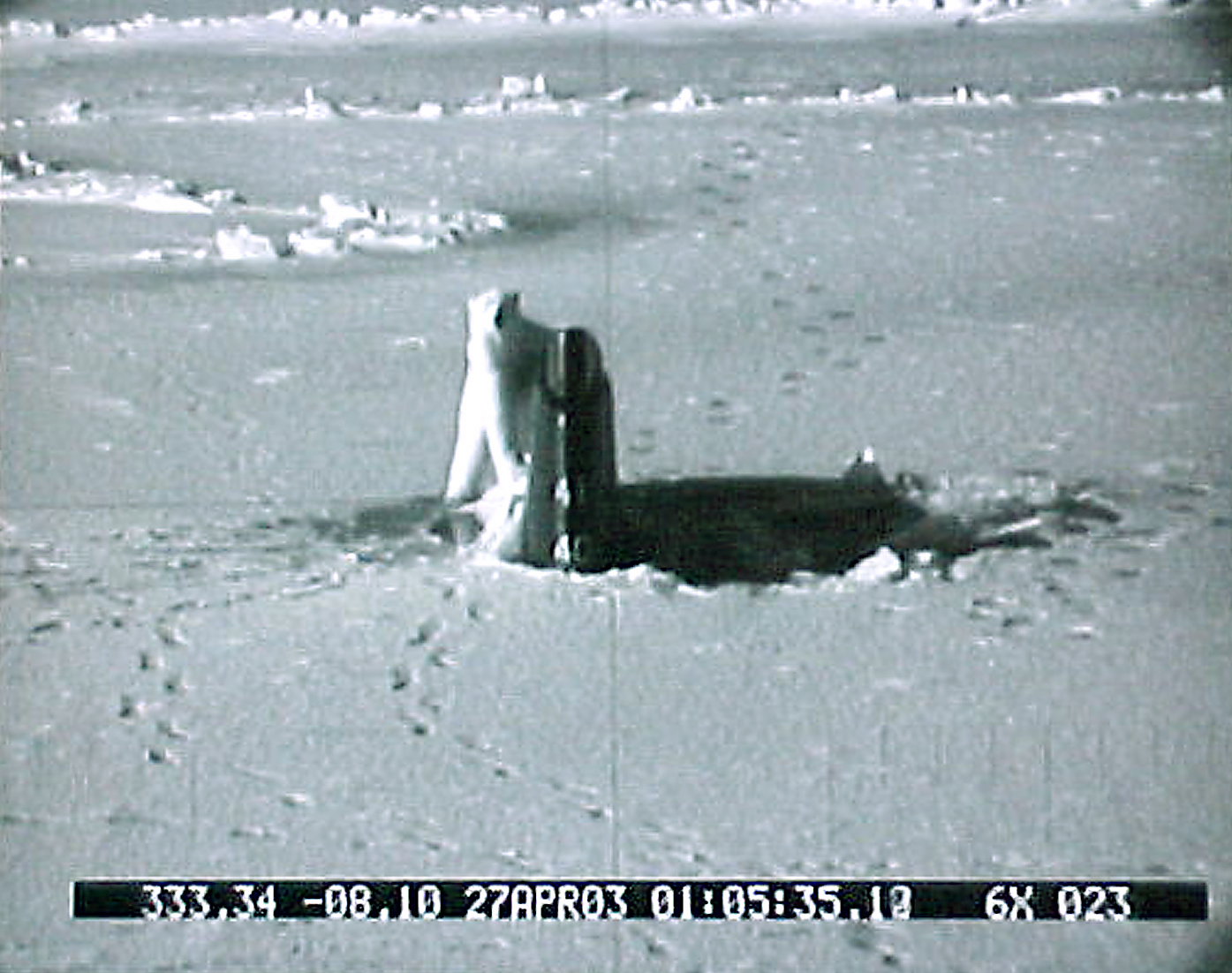
Connecticut breaks polar ice and is encountered by a polar bear.

On 31 March 2004, Connecticut put to sea in support of the war on terror as part of the Wasp Expeditionary Strike Group, returning to NSB New London on 2 September with a pier-side band blasting Thin Lizzy's "The Boys Are Back in Town". For the next three years, Connecticut was largely confined to port as she underwent a prolonged maintenance cycle.

In early 2007, the Navy announced that Connecticut would be transferred to Naval Base Kitsap-Bremerton, in Washington's Puget Sound, following a six-month deployment commencing on 25 July 2007. She would be the last of the Navy's three Seawolf-class submarines to be transferred from New London to Kitsap as part of a larger U.S. Navy realignment shifting 60% of the fleet's submarines to the Pacific. Upon arrival at Kitsap on 30 January 2008, Connecticut joined her Seawolf sisters in Submarine Development Squadron Five.

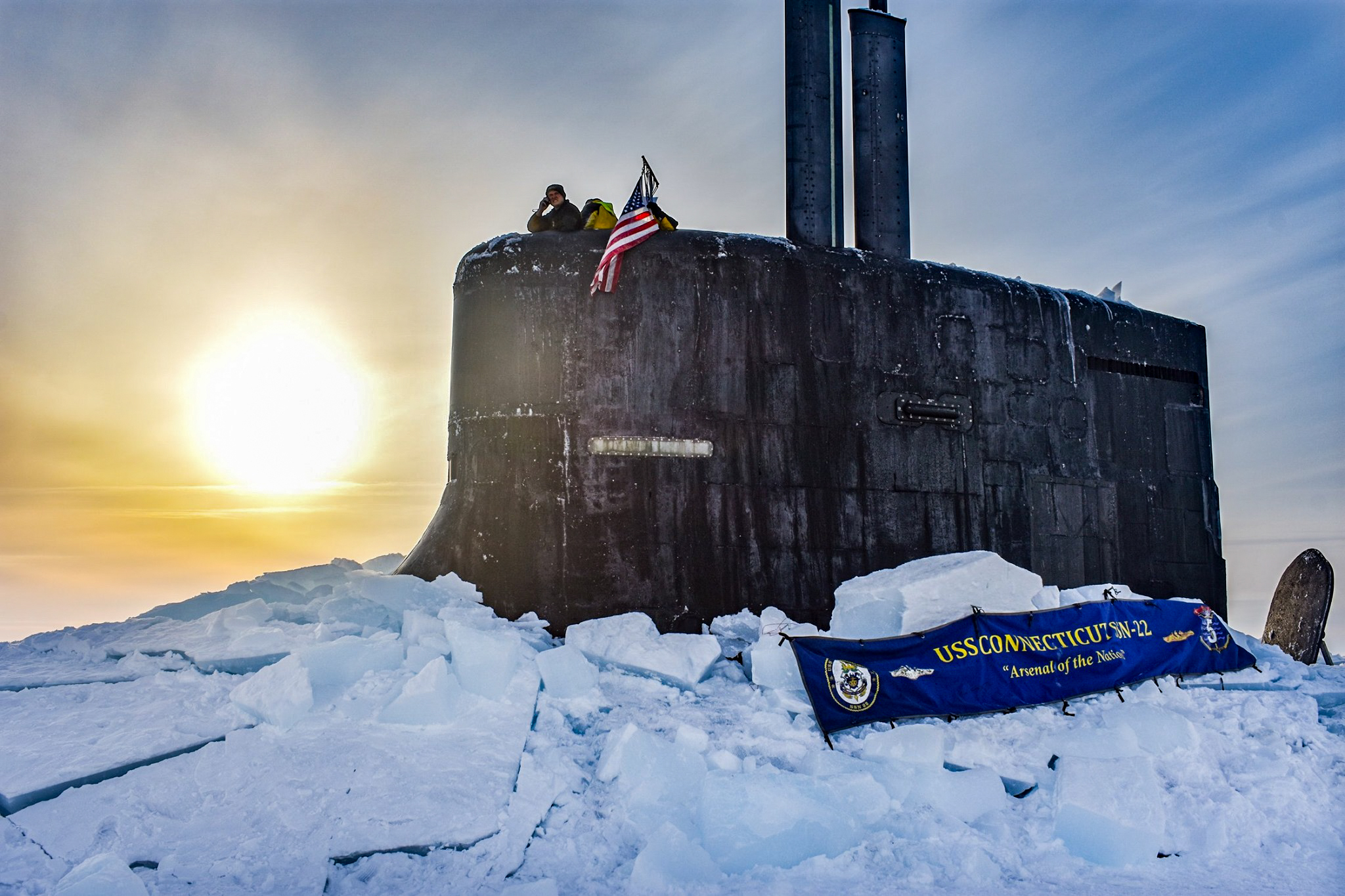
Connecticut surfaced for ICEX 2019

In early 2011, Connecticut participated in ICEX 2011 to "train today's submarines in the challenging Arctic environment", as well as "refine and validate procedures and required equipment."

Connecticut received extensive overhauls from 2012 to 2017. She returned to operation in early 2018 and participated in the Arctic ICEX 2018 operational readiness exercise. Later that year, she deployed to the western Pacific before returning on 30 January 2019.

From 26 March through 19 August 2019, Connecticut underwent maintenance and modernizing in a drydock at Puget Sound Naval Shipyard. The US$17 million project involved 30,000 worker days, and used a hull-climbing robot to inspect the ship's hull.

The Navy planned to extend a submarine pier to moor Connecticut and USS Seawolf together with USS Jimmy Carter at Naval Submarine Base Bangor.

== 2021 pier and seamount collisions ==
On 14 April 2021 during predeployment training, Connecticut hit a pier in Point Loma, California, prompting a separate command investigation and a navigation safety stand down for the boat.

On 2 October 2021, Connecticut was damaged after she collided with a seamount while maneuvering in the South China Sea. About 11 sailors sustained injuries, though none were reported to be life threatening. The submarine's propulsion system was said to be operating normally. After an investigation, the commanding officer, his executive officer, and the chief of the boat were all relieved of duty.

The US Navy is repairing the submarine; work began in 2023 with a repair timeline targeted for 43 months and a planned return to service in September 2026. However, the repair work is still ongoing and the submarine is now scheduled to return in September 2027. The ship is also scheduled to be decommissioned in 2031.

== See also ==
- Major submarine incidents since 2000
  - 2005 USS San Francisco (SSN-711) seamount collision
  - 2008 HMS Superb (S109) underwater pinnacle collision
