= Seawolf-class submarine =

Class of US nuclear attack submarines

Seawolf class
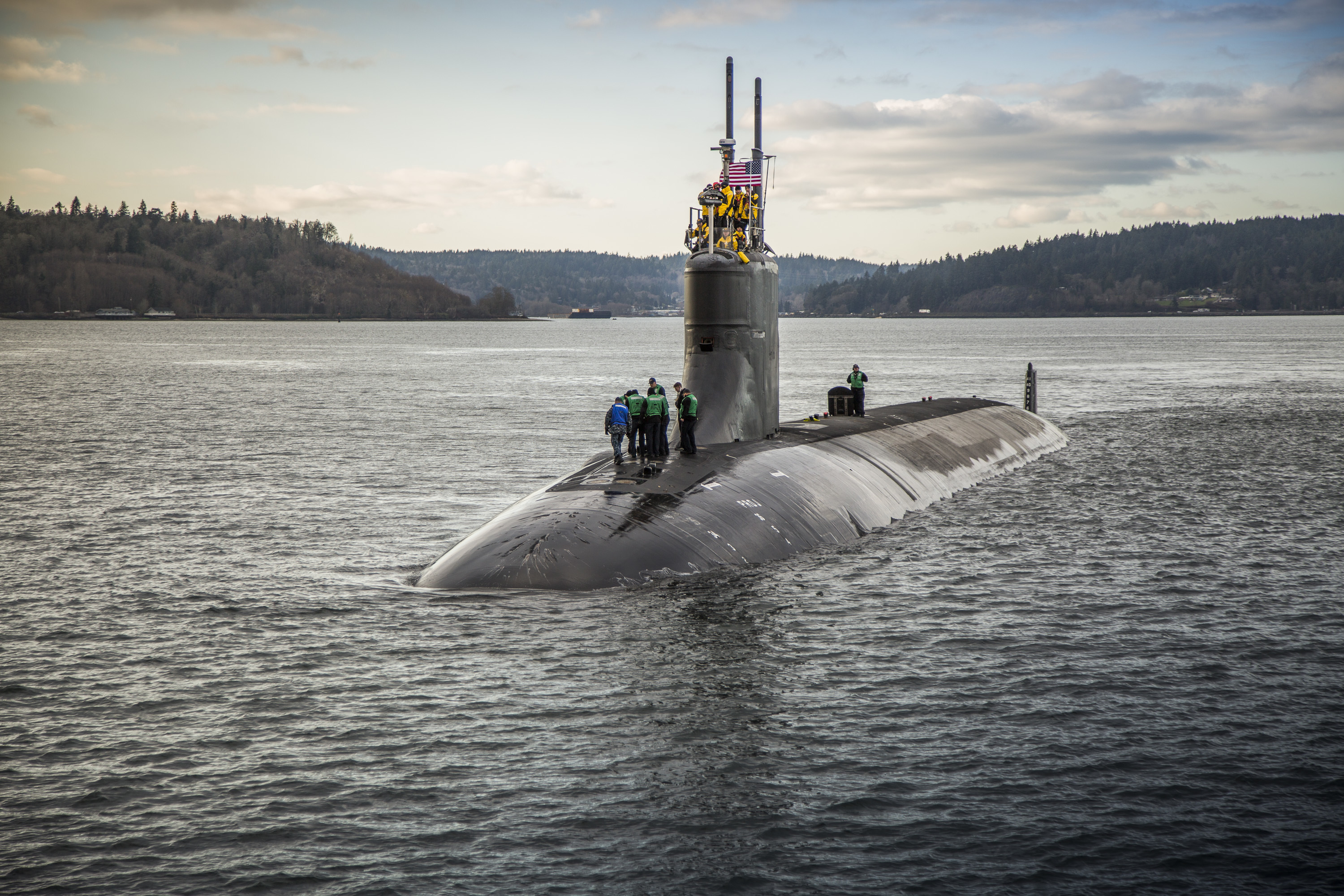
- USS Connecticut (SSN-22), second of the three-boat Seawolf-class

Class overview
- Builders: General Dynamics Electric Boat
- Operators: United States Navy
- Preceded by: Los Angeles class
- Succeeded by: Virginia class
- Cost: $3 billion per unit (equivalent to $6 billion in 2023)
- Built: 1989–2005
- In commission: 1997–present
- Planned: 29
- Completed: 3
- Canceled: 26
- Active: 3

General characteristics
- Type: Nuclear attack submarine
- Displacement: Surfaced: 8,600 tons; Submerged: 9,138 tons, (12,139 tons full, USS Jimmy Carter)
- Length: 353 ft (108 m); 452.8 ft (138.0 m) USS Jimmy Carter
- Beam: 40 ft (12 m)
- Propulsion: 1 S6W PWR 220 MW (300,000 hp), HEU 93.5%; 1 secondary propulsion submerged motor; 2 steam turbines 57,000 shp (43 MW); 1 shaft; 1 pump-jet propeller
- Speed: 20 knots (23 mph; 37 km/h) (silent); 35 knots (40 mph; 65 km/h) (maximum)
- Range: Unlimited
- Endurance: Only limited by food supplies
- Test depth: 1,600 ft (490 m)
- Complement: 140
- Crew: 14 officers; 126 enlisted
- Armament: 8 × 26.5-inch torpedo tubes, sleeved for 21-inch weapons (up to 50 Tomahawk land attack missile/Harpoon anti-ship missile/Mk 48 guided torpedo carried in torpedo room)

Silhouette profiles of the two boat sub-types in this class

Seawolf subgroup; USS Seawolf & USS Connecticut (boats 1 and 2) profile

Jimmy Carter subgroup; USS Jimmy Carter (boat 3) profile

The Seawolf class is a class of nuclear-powered, fast-attack submarines (SSN) in service with the United States Navy. The class was the intended successor to the Los Angeles class, and design work began in 1983. A fleet of 29 submarines was to be built over a 10-year period, but that was reduced to 12 submarines. The end of the Cold War and budget constraints led to the cancellation of any further additions to the fleet in 1995, leaving the Seawolf class limited to just three boats. This, in turn, led to the design of the smaller Virginia class. The Seawolf class cost about $3 billion each ($3.5 billion for USS Jimmy Carter), making her the most expensive United States Navy fast-attack submarine and second-most-expensive submarine ever, after the French Triomphant-class nuclear-powered ballistic-missile submarines.

== Design ==
The Seawolf design was intended to combat the threat of advanced Soviet ballistic-missile submarines such as the Typhoon class, and attack submarines such as the Akula class in a deep-ocean environment. Seawolf-class hulls are constructed from HY-100 steel, which is stronger than the HY-80 steel employed in previous classes, to withstand water pressure at greater depths.

Seawolf-class submarines are larger, faster, and significantly quieter than previous Los Angeles-class submarines; they also carry more weapons and have twice as many torpedo tubes. The boats are able to carry up to 50 UGM-109 Tomahawk cruise missiles for attacking land- and sea-surface targets. The boats also have extensive equipment to allow shallow-water operations. The class uses the more advanced ARCI Modified AN/BSY-2 combat system, which includes a larger, spherical sonar array, a wide-aperture array, and a new towed-array sonar. Each boat is powered by a single S6W nuclear reactor, delivering 45,000 hp (34 MW) to a low-noise pump-jet.

As a result of their advanced design, however, Seawolf-class submarines were much more expensive. The projected cost for 12 submarines of this class was $33.6 billion, but construction was stopped at three boats when the Cold War ended.

== Variants ==
USS Jimmy Carter is roughly 100 feet (30 m) longer than the other two boats of her class because it has an additional central section known as the multi-mission platform (MMP), which allows launch and recovery of remotely operated underwater vehicles and Navy SEALs. The MMP may also be used as an underwater splicing chamber for tapping of undersea fiber-optic cables. This role was formerly filled by the now-decommissioned USS Parche. Jimmy Carter was modified for this role by General Dynamics Electric Boat at a cost of $887 million.

== Boats in class ==
Name	Hull no.	Builder	Laid down	Launched	Commissioned	Status
Seawolf	SSN-21	General Dynamics Electric Boat, Groton	25 October 1989	24 June 1995	19 July 1997	Active in service
Connecticut	SSN-22	General Dynamics Electric Boat, Groton	14 September 1992	1 September 1997	11 December 1998	Active in service
Jimmy Carter	SSN-23	General Dynamics Electric Boat, Groton	5 December 1998	13 May 2004	19 February 2005	Active in service

== See also ==
- List of submarine classes of the United States Navy
- List of submarines of the United States Navy
- List of submarine classes in service
- List of military electronics of the United States
- Submarines in the United States Navy
- Cruise missile submarine
- Attack submarine
