= USS San Juan (SSN-751) =

Los Angeles-class nuclear-powered attack submarine of the US Navy

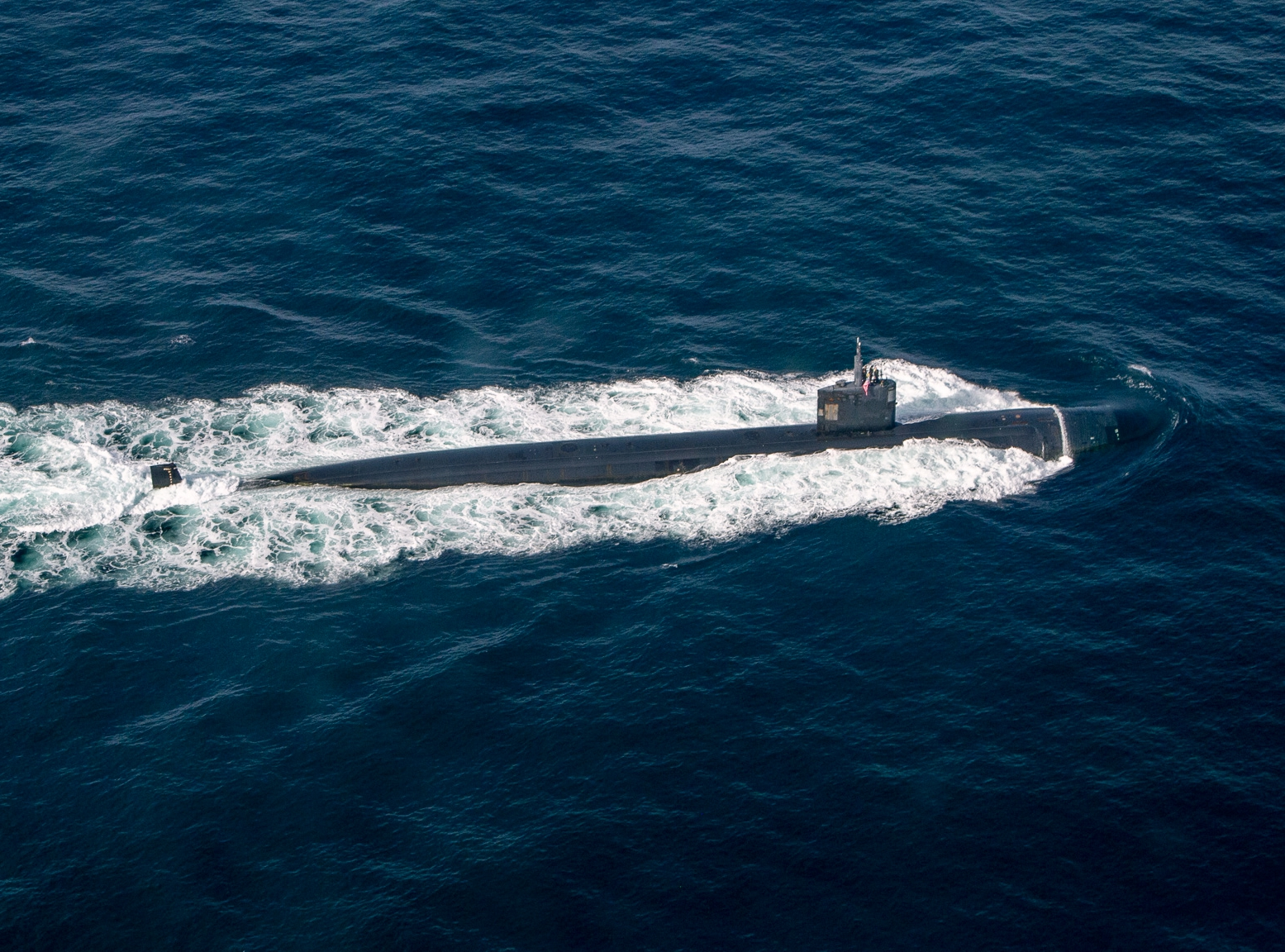
- USS San Juan in the Atlantic Ocean, 29 August 2023

History

United States
- Name: San Juan
- Namesake: The City of San Juan, Puerto Rico
- Awarded: 30 November 1982
- Builder: General Dynamics Electric Boat
- Laid down: 9 August 1985
- Launched: 6 December 1986
- Sponsored by: Mrs. Sherrill Hernandez
- Commissioned: 6 August 1988
- Decommissioned: 6 August 2026
- Home port: Naval Base Kitsap-Bremerton
- Identification: 21312; MMSI number: 369970217; Callsign: NSJP
- Motto: Technology and Tradition
- Status: Decommissioned
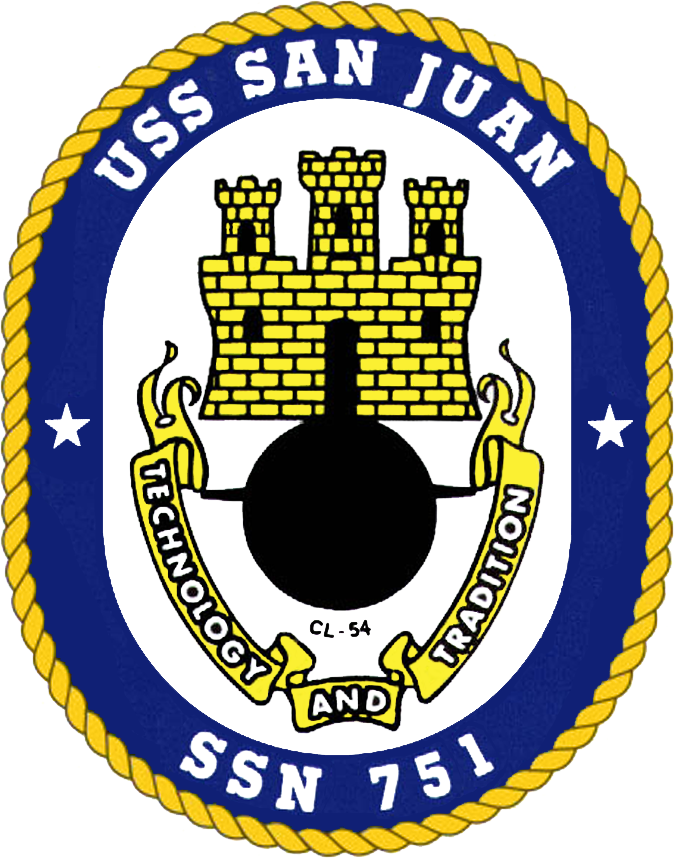
- Badge

General characteristics
- Class & type: Los Angeles-class submarine
- Displacement: 5,790 long tons (5,883 t) light; 6,197 long tons (6,296 t) full; 407 long tons (414 t) dead
- Length: 110.3 m (361 ft 11 in)
- Beam: 10 m (32 ft 10 in)
- Draft: 9.4 m (30 ft 10 in)
- Installed power: Nuclear
- Propulsion: 1 × S6G PWR nuclear reactor with D2W core (165 MW), HEU 93.5%; 2 × steam turbines (33,500) shp; 1 × shaft; 1 × secondary propulsion motor 325 hp (242 kW)
- Speed: Classified
- Complement: 12 officers, 98 men
- Sensors & processing systems: BSY-1 sonar suite combat system
- Armament: 4 × 21 in (533 mm) torpedo tubes; 12 × vertical launch Tomahawk missiles

USS San Juan (SSN-751), a Los Angeles-class submarine, was the third ship of the United States Navy to be named San Juan, though only the second named for San Juan, Puerto Rico. The contract to build her was awarded to the Electric Boat Division of General Dynamics Corporation in Groton, Connecticut on 30 November 1982 and her keel was laid down on 9 August 1985. She was launched on 6 December 1986 sponsored by Mrs. Sherrill Hernandez, wife of VADM Diego E. Hernández, and commissioned on 6 August 1988.

During the early evening of 13 March 2007, units of the USS Enterprise Carrier Strike Group (CSG) received a series of indications that USS San Juan (SSN-751), a Los Angeles-class submarine conducting pre-deployment training with the Enterprise CSG, was in distress.

The submarine established communications in the early morning hours of 14 March, and indicated that there were no problems; hence, units were able to stand down from the search and rescue that was already well underway.

== History ==
San Juan was the first of the Flight III or 688i for "improved" design, that received a number of significant improvements to the previous boats in the class. San Juan and all subsequent boats in her class are quieter and incorporate an advanced AN/BSY-1 sonar suite combat system. Another improvement includes the ability to lay mines from their torpedo tubes. San Juan's sail was also strengthened, enabling the ability to break through ice.

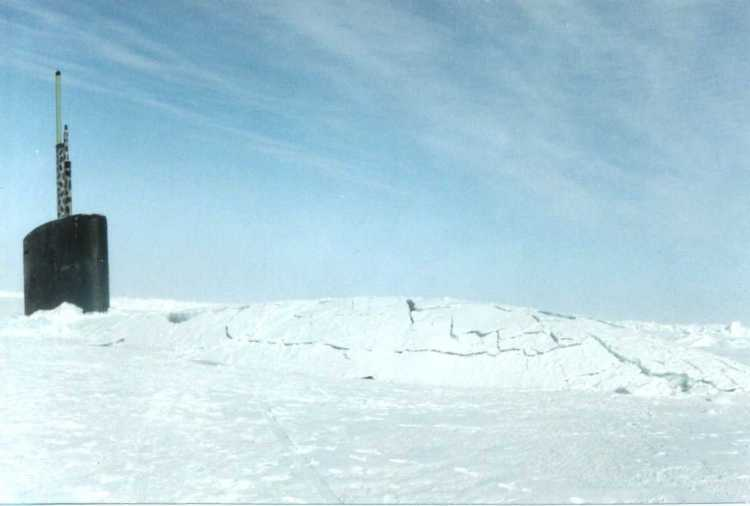
USS San Juan through-ice surface

=== First 688i through-ice surfacing ===
In 1993 San Juan conducted the first through-ice surfacing for a 688i-class submarine in the Arctic.

=== Collision with USS Kentucky ===
On 19 March 1998 off the coast of Long Island, New York, the submerged San Juan collided with the surfaced fleet ballistic missile submarine USS Kentucky (SSBN-737). There were no injuries reported as a result of the collision.

=== Lost communication ===
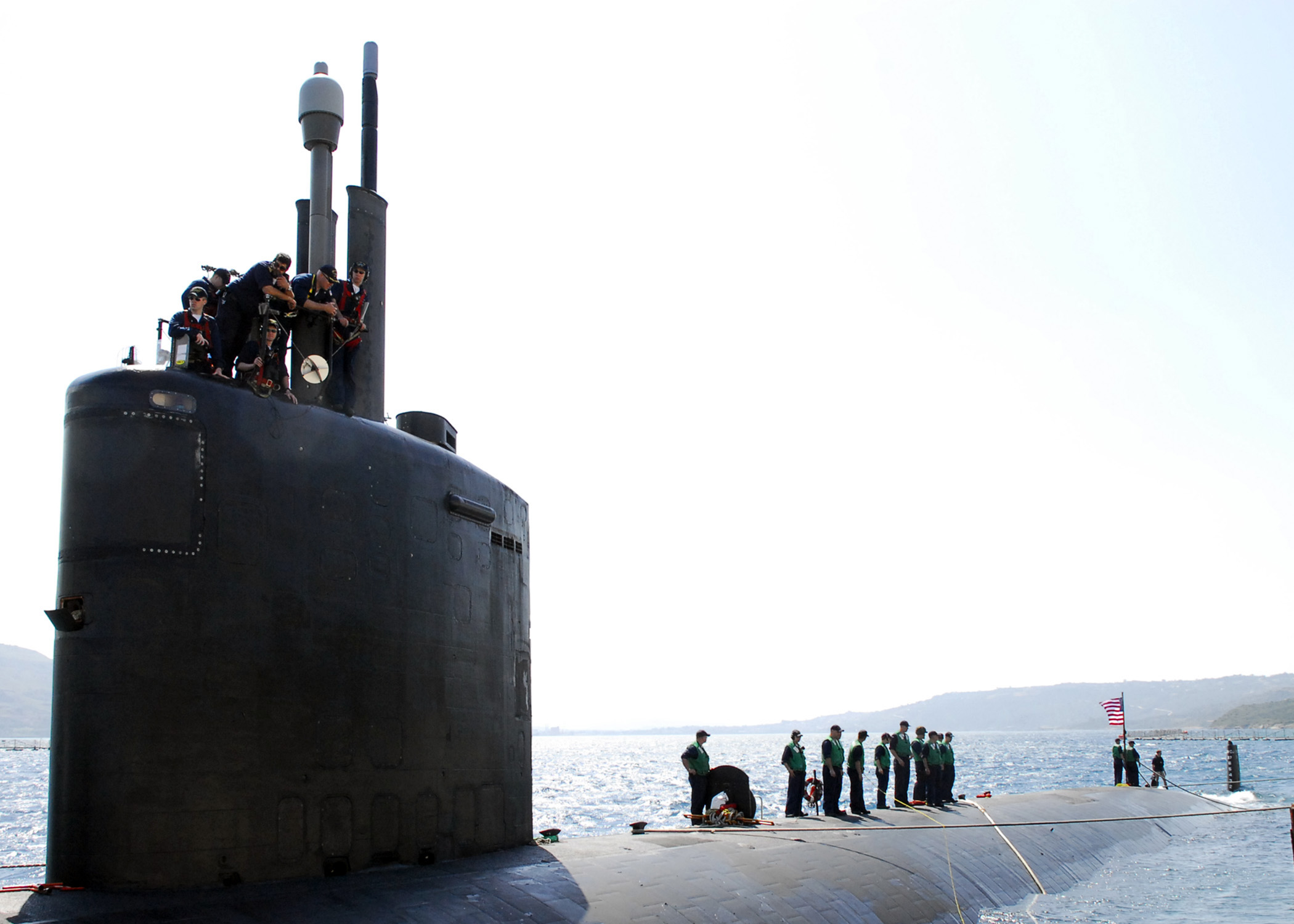
San Juan in May 2007

On 13 March 2007, San Juan was the subject of a search and rescue mission by the carrier USS Enterprise and elements of her Carrier Strike Group off the coast of Florida, when contact with the submarine was lost, and a red flare was spotted in her projected vicinity, suggesting an emergency. Communications were re-established early the next day when San Juan surfaced, and no problems were indicated.

=== Visit to South Africa ===
On 4 November 2009 San Juan arrived at Simon's Town, South Africa. The ship engaged in at-sea maneuvers with the South African Navy for the first time in U.S. history.

=== 2010 overhaul ===
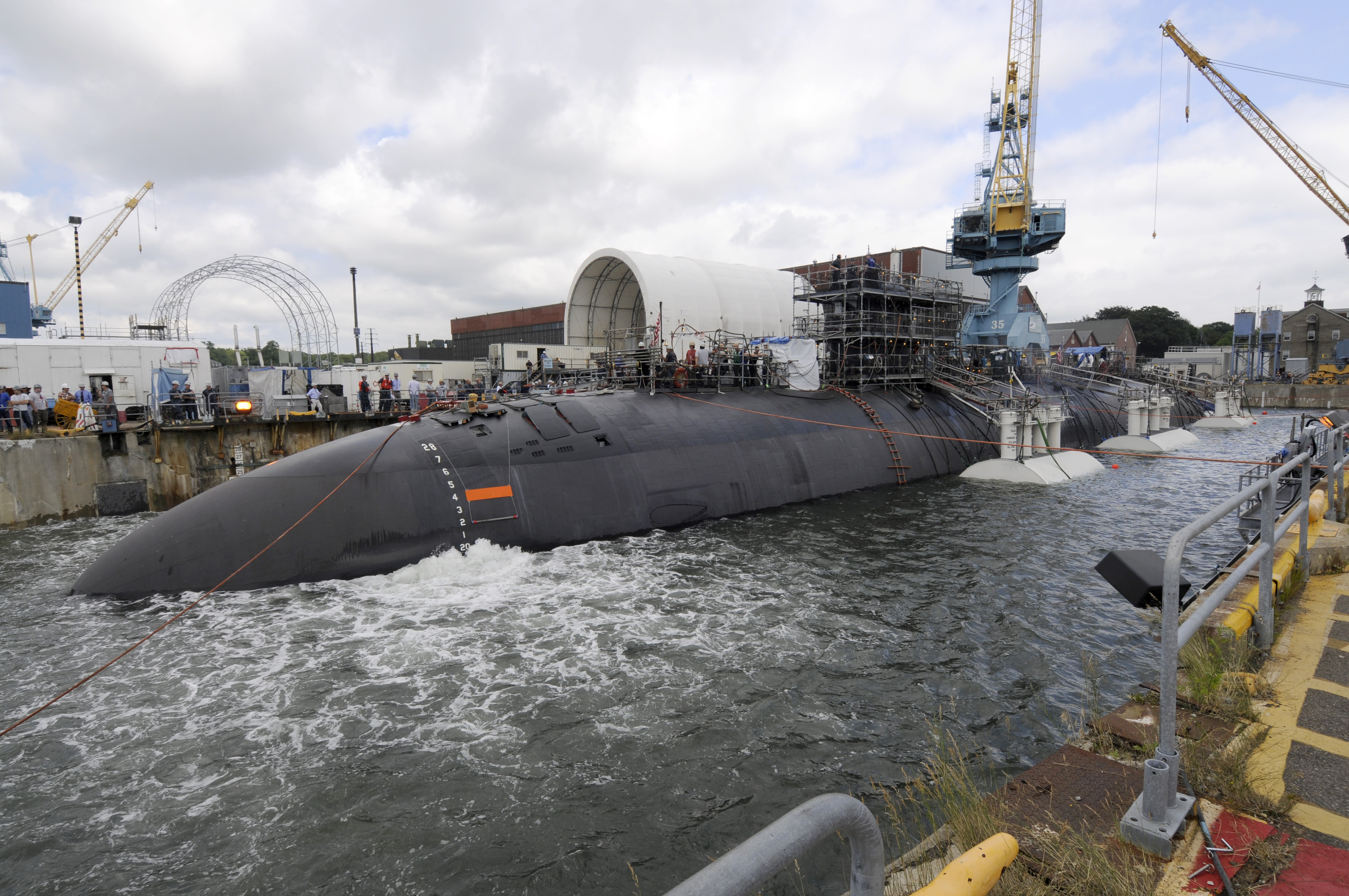
San Juan undocking at PNSY, 2011

San Juan arrived at Portsmouth Naval Shipyard (PNSY), Maine, on 8 April 2010 for an engineered overhaul (EOH); for maintenance and system upgrades.

As of 2012 San Juan was assigned to Submarine Group Two. Submarine Group Two was disestablished in 2014, and San Juan became part of Submarine Force, U.S. Atlantic Fleet (COMSUBLANT).

=== Decommissioning ===
On 20 September 2023 San Juan arrived at Puget Sound Naval Shipyard for decommissioning. San Juan was officially decommissioned on 6 August 2026, on the anniversary of the ship’s commissioning.

== Awards ==
- Battle E – 30 September 1991
- Battle E – 30 September 1992
- Battle E – 30 September 1994
- Navy Unit Commendation – 1 July 1994
- Meritorious Unit Commendation – 1 July 1997
- Meritorious Unit Commendation – 10 December 1998
- Battle E – 31 December 2002
- Armed Forces Expeditionary Medal – 31 March 2003
- Meritorious Unit Commendation – 5 October 2005
- Meritorious Unit Commendation – 22 November 2009
- Battle E – 8 January 2010
- Battle Effectiveness Award – 12 January 2017
