= USS Jimmy Carter =

US Navy Seawolf-class submarine

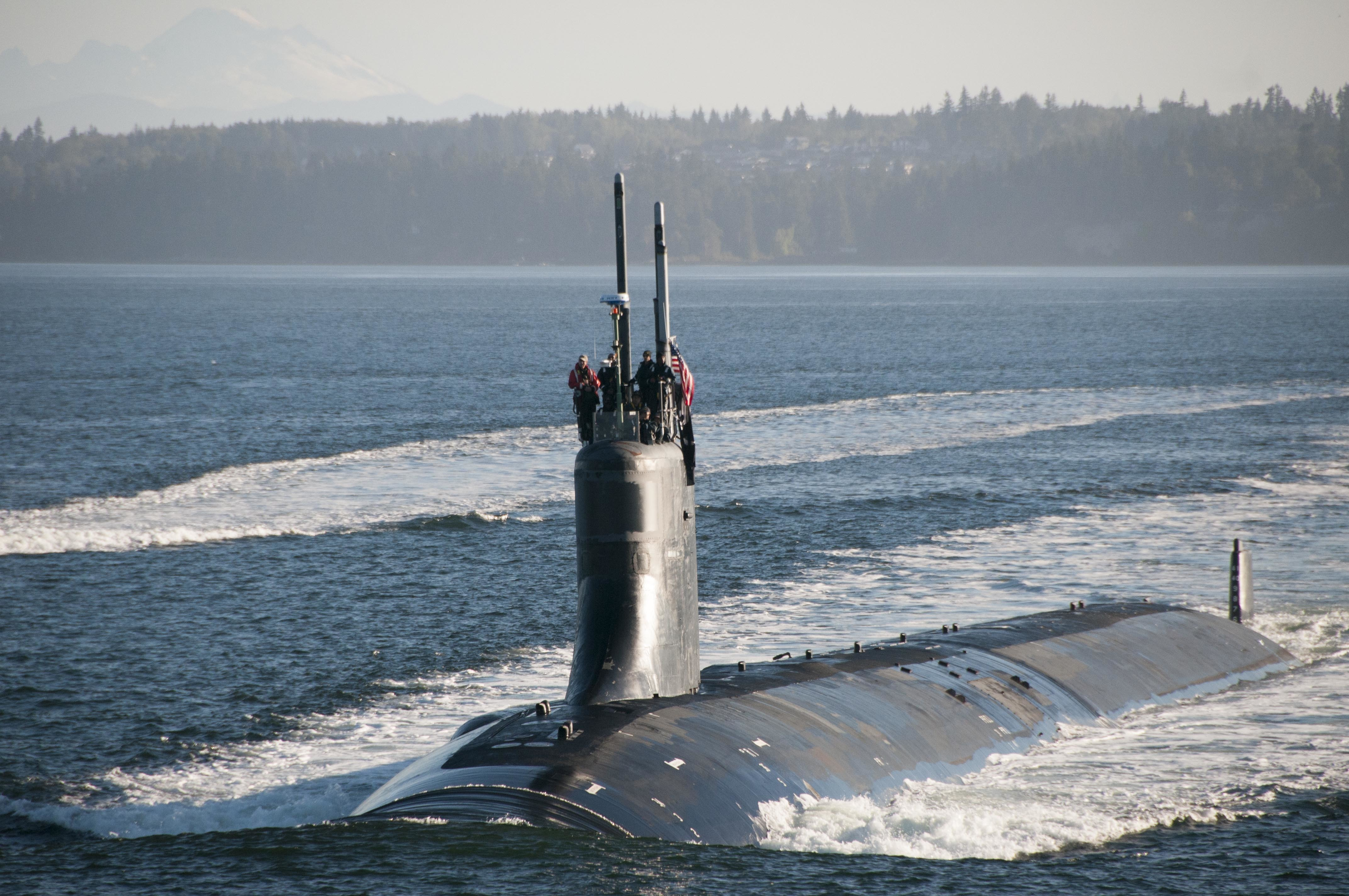
- Jimmy Carter returns to NSB Kitsap, 2017

- Jimmy Carter's profile

History

United States
- Name: USS Jimmy Carter
- Namesake: Jimmy Carter
- Ordered: 29 June 1996
- Builder: General Dynamics Electric Boat
- Laid down: 5 December 1998
- Launched: 13 May 2004
- Christened: 5 June 2004
- Commissioned: 19 February 2005
- Home port: Bangor Annex of Naval Base Kitsap, Washington
- Motto: Semper Optima ("Always the Best")
- Status: in active service
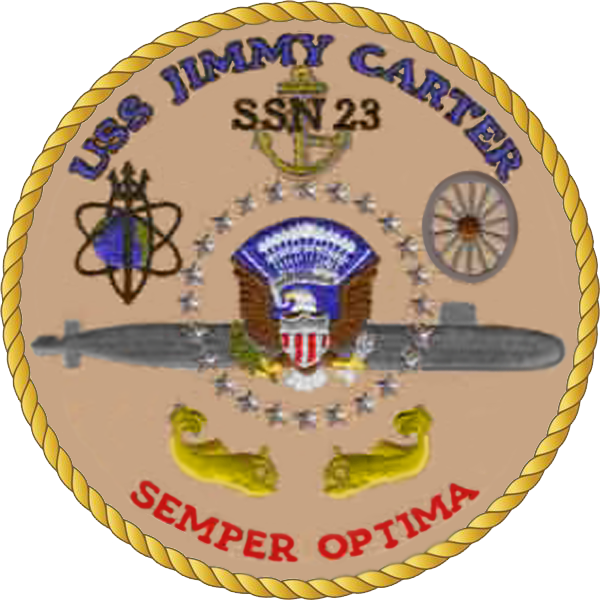
- Badge

General characteristics
- Class & type: Modified Seawolf-class submarine
- Displacement: 7,568 tons light; 12,139 tons full; 1,569 tons dead
- Length: 138 m (452.8 ft) overall; 128.5 m (421.6 ft) waterline length
- Beam: 12.1 m (39.7 ft)
- Draft: 10.9 m (35.8 ft)
- Propulsion: 1 S6W PWR 220 MW (300,000 hp), HEU 93.5%; 1 secondary propulsion submerged motor; 2 steam turbines 57,000 shp (43 MW); 1 shaft; 1 pump-jet propeller
- Speed: greater than 25 knots (46 km/h)
- Complement: 15 officers, 126 enlisted
- Armament: 8 × 26.5 inch torpedo tubes, sleeved for 21 inch weapons (up to 50 Tomahawk land attack missile/Harpoon anti-ship missile/Mk 48 guided torpedo carried in torpedo room)

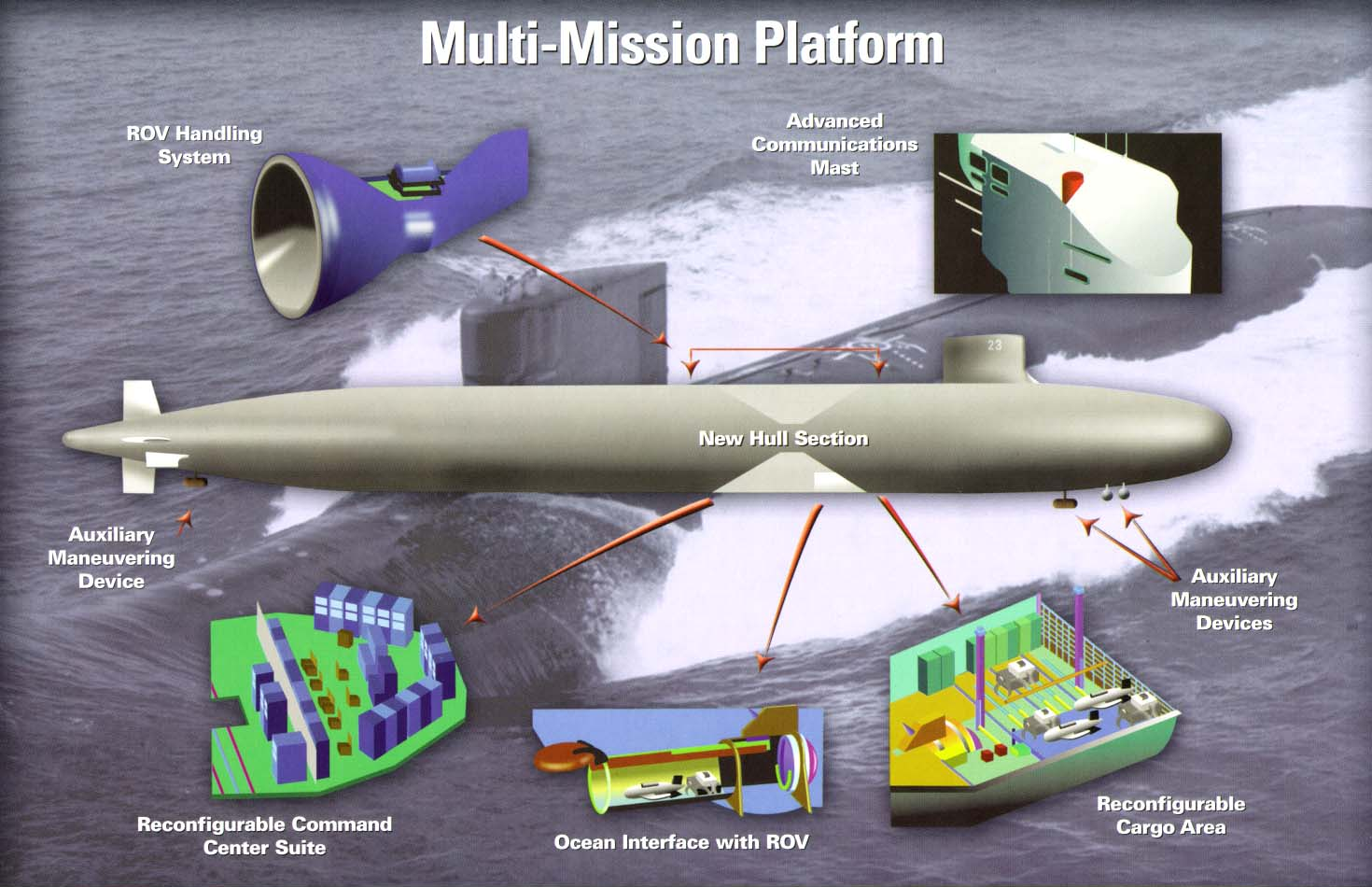
Diagram of Jimmy Carter, showing added features

USS Jimmy Carter (SSN-23) is the third and final Seawolf-class nuclear-powered fast-attack submarine in the United States Navy. Commissioned in 2005, she is named for the 39th president of the United States, Jimmy Carter, the only president to have qualified on submarines. The only submarine to have been named for a then living president, Jimmy Carter is also one of the few vessels, and only the third submarine of the US Navy, to have been named for a living person. Extensively modified from the original design of her class, she is sometimes described as a subclass unto herself.

== History ==
=== Construction ===
The contract to build Jimmy Carter was to the Electric Boat Division of General Dynamics Corporation in Groton, Connecticut on 29 June 1996, and her keel was laid on 5 December 1998. Original schedules called for Jimmy Carter to be commissioned in late 2001 or early 2002. Electric Boat was awarded an $887 million extension to the Jimmy Carter contract on 10 December 1999 to modify the boat for testing new submarine systems and classified missions previously carried out by USS Parche. During modification, her hull was extended 100 feet (30 m) to create a 2,500-ton supplementary middle section which forms a Multi-Mission Platform (MMP). This section is fitted with an ocean interface for divers, remotely operated vehicles (ROVs), and special operation equipment; ROV handling system, storage, and deployment space for mission systems, and a pressure-resistant passage between the fore and aft parts of the submarine to accommodate the boat's crew.

Jimmy Carter was christened on 5 June 2004, and the ship sponsor was former First Lady Rosalynn Carter. One result of the changes was that Jimmy Carter was commissioned more than six years after USS Connecticut and almost four months after the commissioning of USS Virginia, the first of the Virginia-class subs.

Jimmy Carter has additional maneuvering devices fitted fore and aft that allow her to keep station over selected targets in odd currents. Intelligence experts speculate that the MMP may find use in missions as an underwater splicing chamber for optical fiber cables.

=== Deployments ===
On 19 November 2004 Jimmy Carter completed alpha sea trials, her first voyage in the open seas. On 22 December, Electric Boat delivered Jimmy Carter to the US Navy, and she was commissioned 19 February 2005 at NSB New London.

Jimmy Carter began a transit from NSB New London to her new homeport at the Bangor Annex of Naval Base Kitsap, Washington on 14 October 2005 but was forced to return when an unusually high wave caused damage while the submarine was running on the surface. The damage was repaired and Jimmy Carter left New London the following day, arriving at Bangor the afternoon of 9 November 2005.

In April and September 2017 Jimmy Carter returned twice to her homeport at Naval Base Kitsap-Bangor, flying a Jolly Roger flag, traditionally indicative of a successful mission.

In 2025, the US Navy developed plans to convert USS Baltimore (SSGN-812), a planned Block V Virginia-class submarine, into a seabed warfare submarine to replace the roles held by Jimmy Carter.

== Awards ==
- 2005 National Defense Service Medal
- 2007 Battle Efficiency Award, commonly known as a "Battle E".
- 2012 Battle Efficiency Award.
- 2013 Presidential Unit Citation, the equivalent to the Navy Cross for the entire ship, for what has been reported as "Mission 7."

== Gallery ==
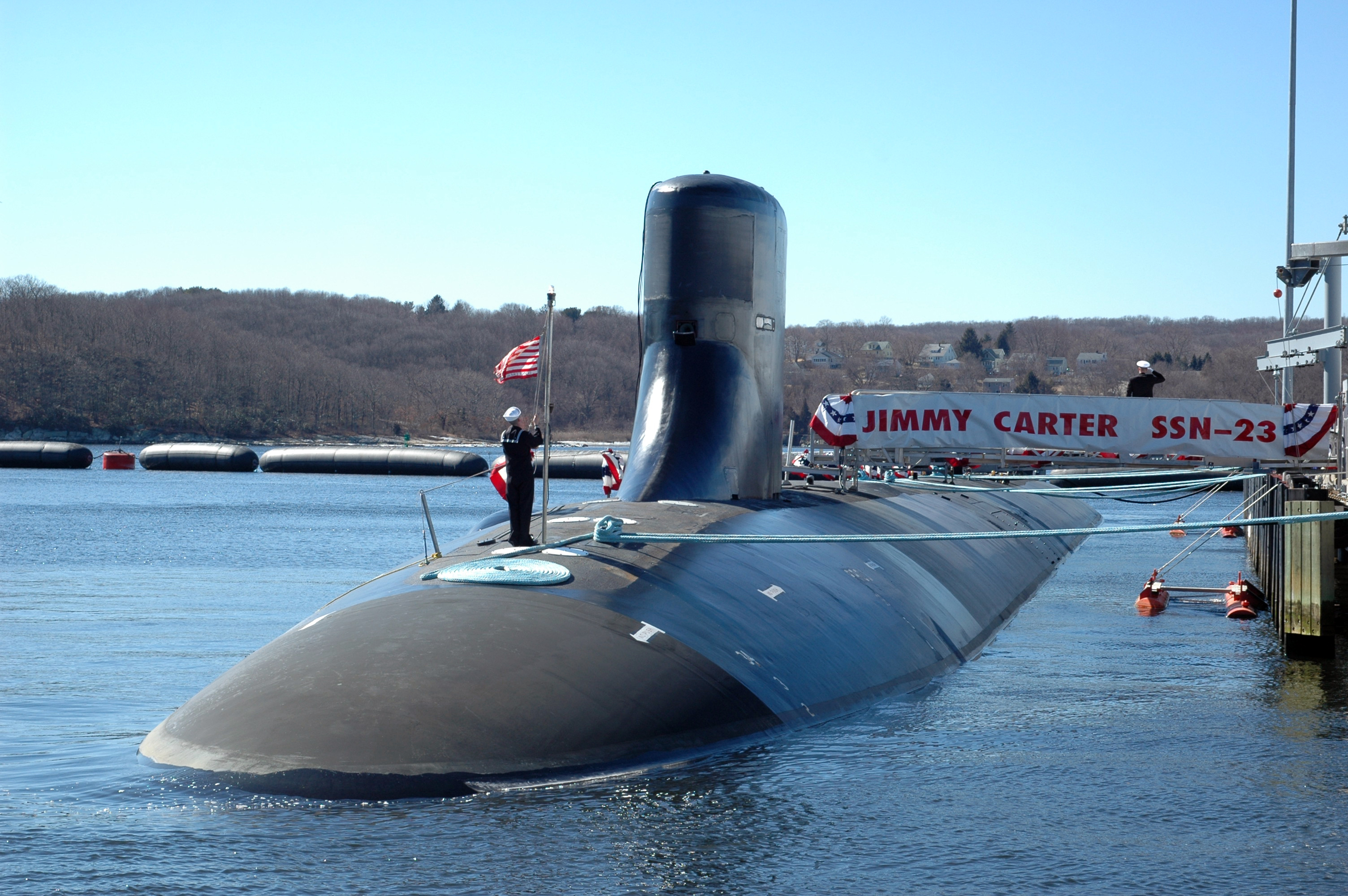
Jimmy Carter during the submarine's commissioning ceremony, 19 February 2005

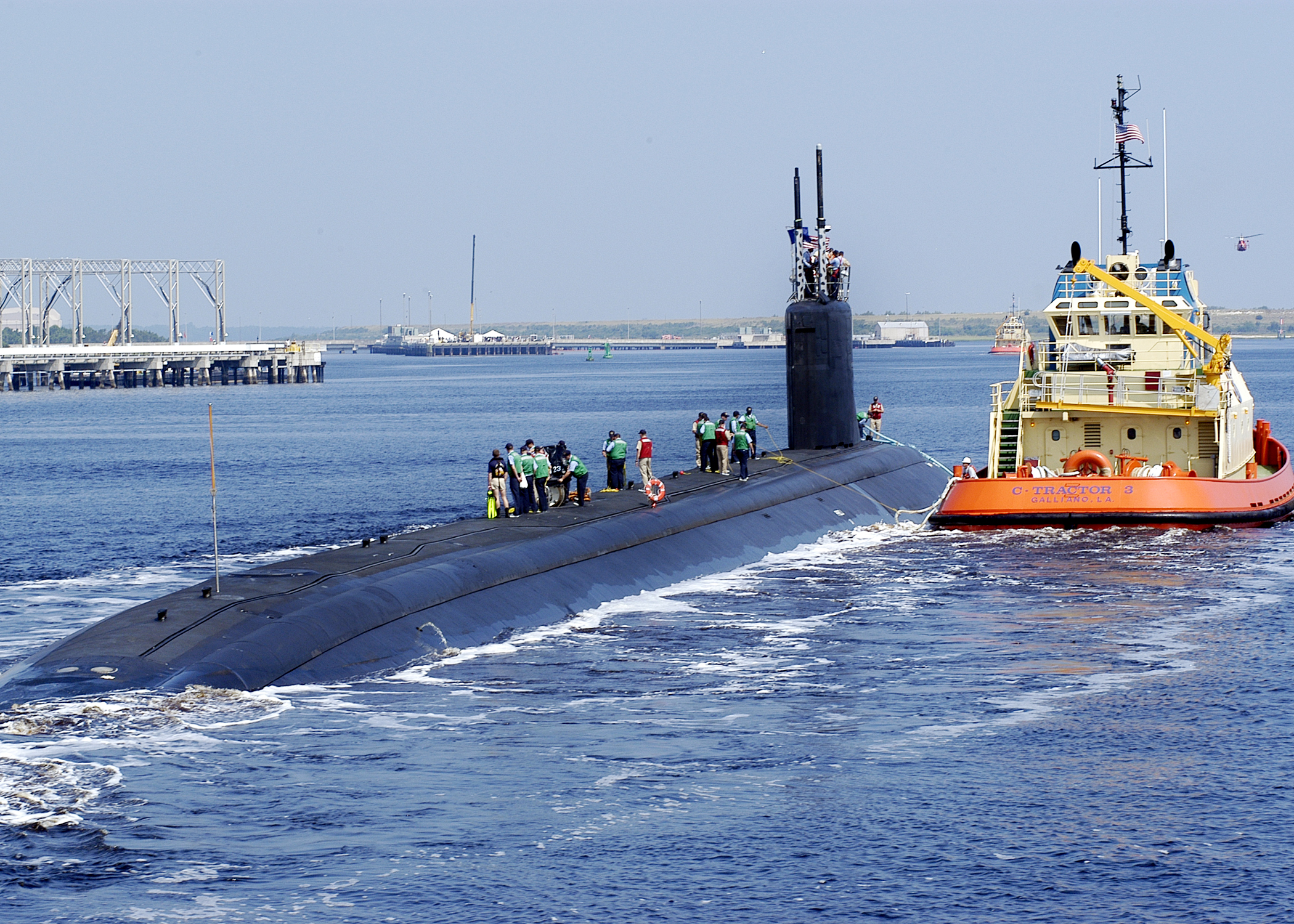
Departing NSB Kings Bay with Jimmy and Rosalynn Carter aboard, 2005

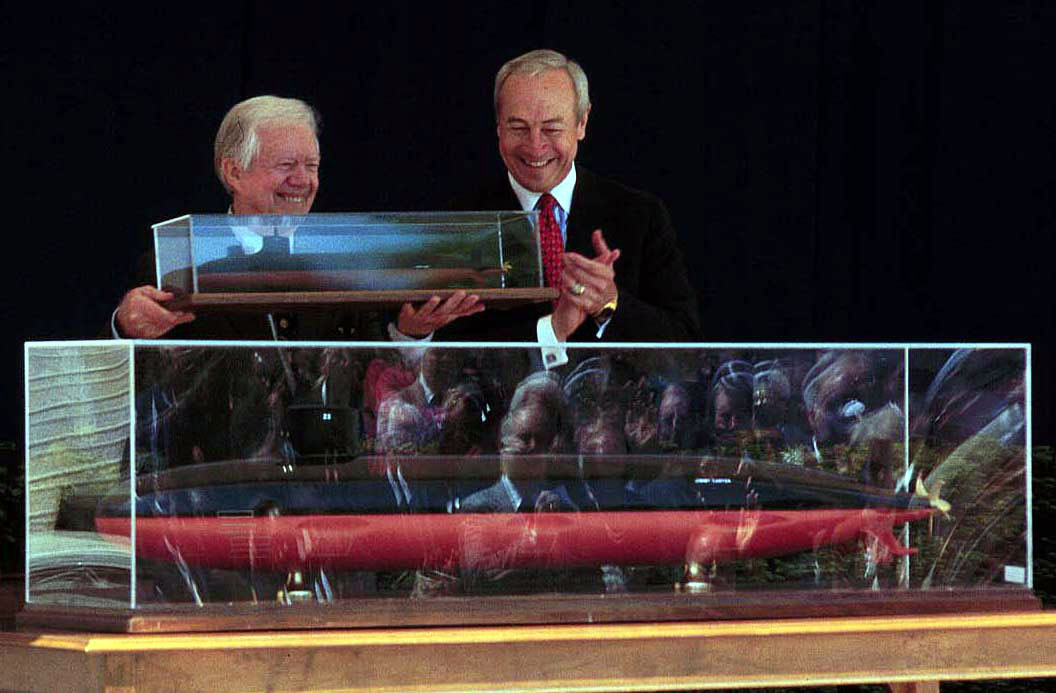
Former President Carter holding a model of the boat that carries his name.

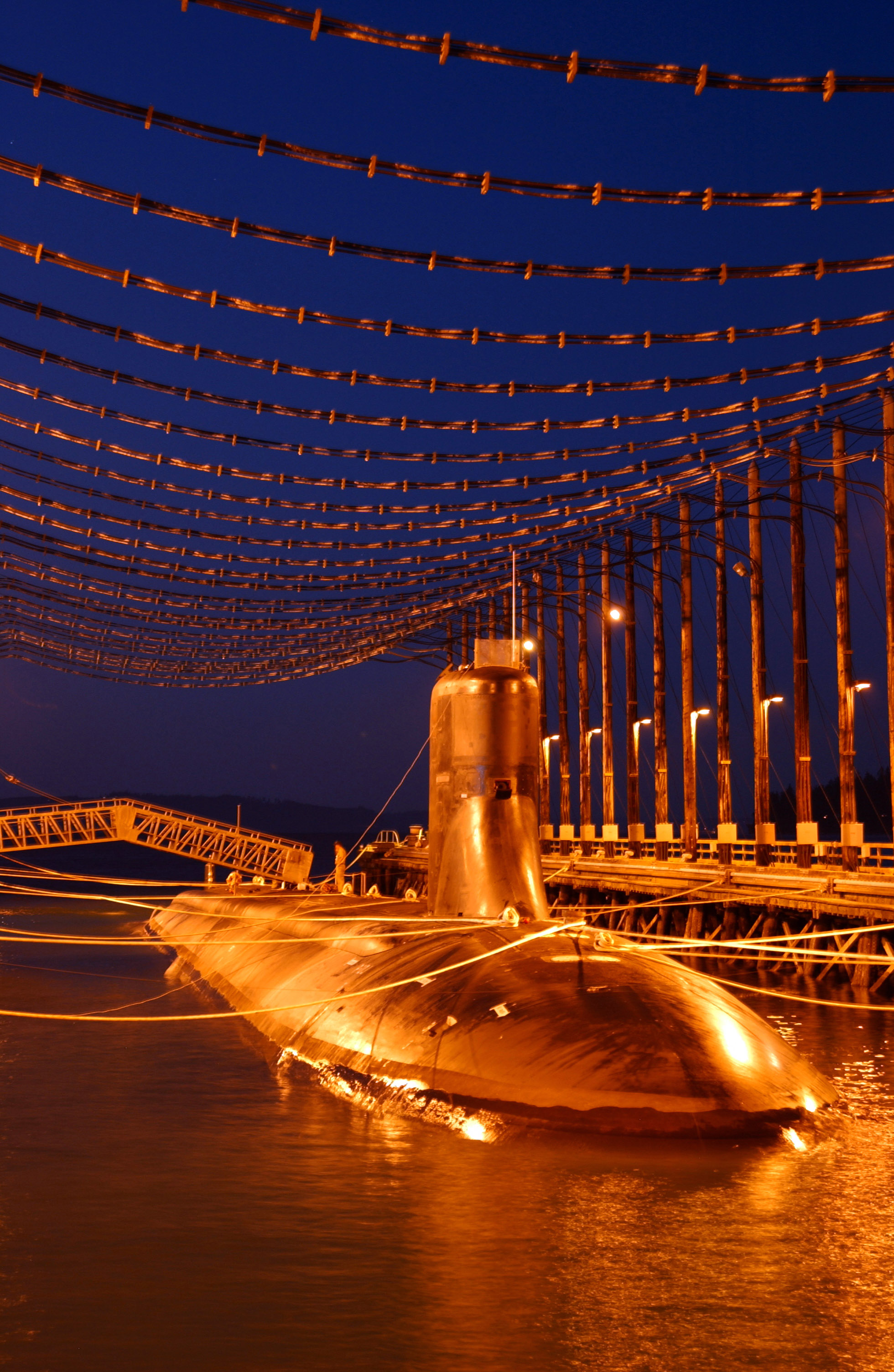
Jimmy Carter in the Magnetic Silencing Facility at Naval Base Kitsap for her first deperming treatment.

== See also ==
- USS Parche
