= USS Seawolf (SSN-21) =

Submarine of the United States

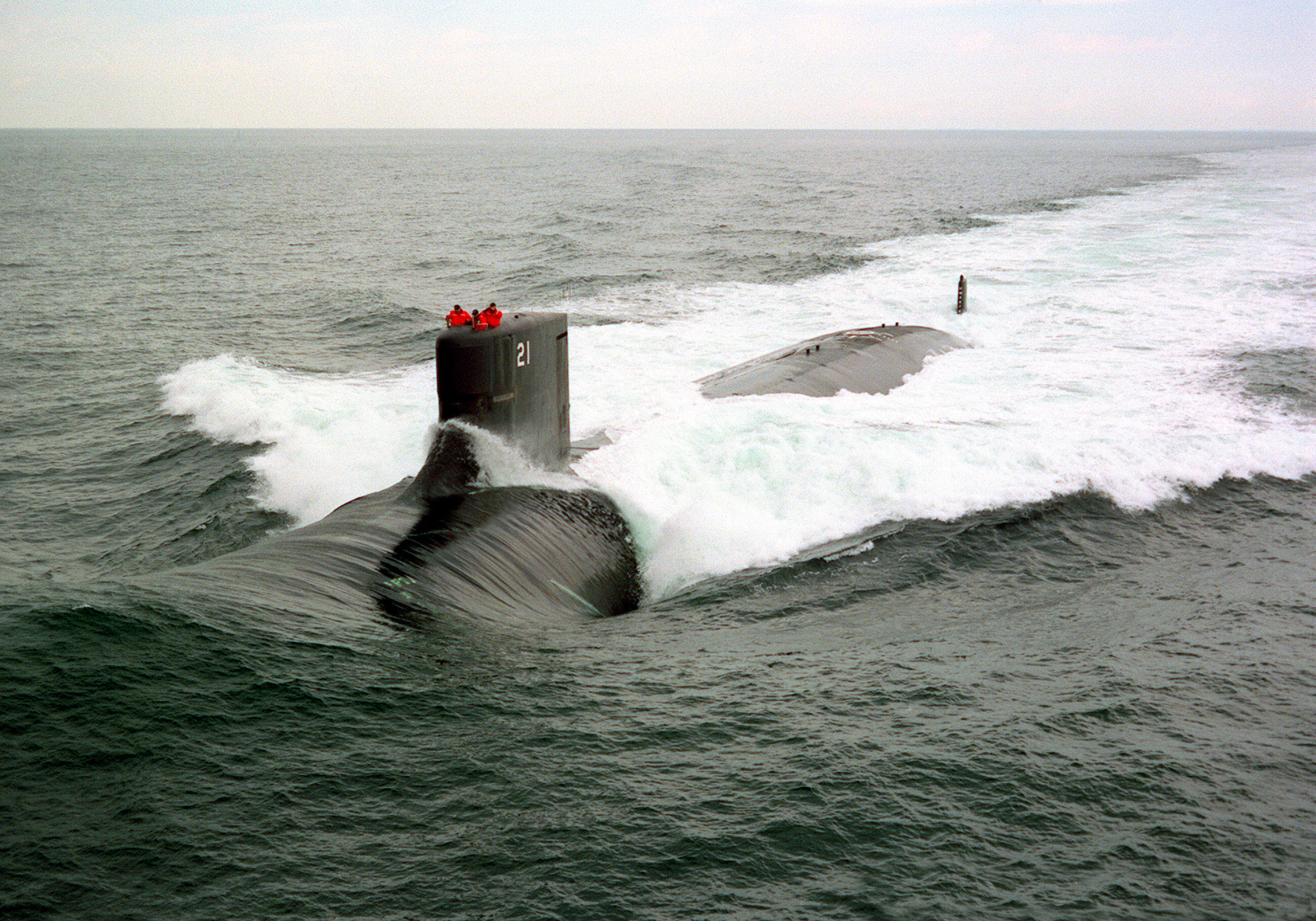
- USS Seawolf conducting sea trials in 1996.

History

United States
- Namesake: Seawolf
- Awarded: 9 January 1989
- Builder: General Dynamics Electric Boat
- Laid down: 25 October 1989
- Launched: 24 June 1995
- Commissioned: 19 July 1997
- Home port: Naval Base Kitsap-Bangor
- Motto: Cave Lupum (English: "Beware the Wolf")
- Status: in active service
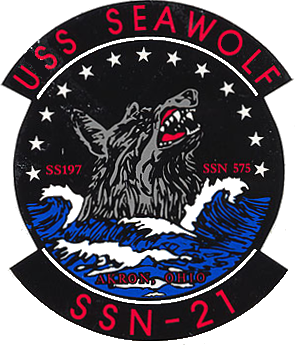
- Badge

General characteristics
- Class & type: Seawolf-class submarine
- Length: 353 ft (108 m)
- Beam: 40 ft (12 m)
- Draft: 36 ft (11 m)
- Propulsion: 1 S6W PWR 220 MW (300,000 hp), HEU 93.5%; 1 secondary propulsion submerged motor; 2 steam turbines 57,000 shp (43 MW); 1 shaft; 1 pump-jet propeller
- Speed: 25+ knots submerged, 18+ knots surfaced
- Test depth: Greater than 800 ft (240 m)
- Complement: 15 officers and 101 enlisted
- Armament: 8 × 26.5-inch torpedo tubes, sleeved for 21-inch weapons (up to 50 Tomahawk land attack missile/Harpoon anti-ship missile/Mk 48 guided torpedo carried in torpedo room)

USS Seawolf (hull number SSN-21) is a nuclear-powered fast attack submarine and the lead ship of her class. She is the fourth submarine of the United States Navy named for the seawolf.

== Construction ==
The contract to build Seawolf was awarded to the Electric Boat Division of General Dynamics on 9 January 1989 and her keel was laid down on 25 October 1989. She was launched on 24 June 1995, sponsored by Mrs. Margaret Dalton, and commissioned on 19 July 1997. The 7-year 9-month time period from keel laying to commissioning is the longest for a submarine in the U.S. Navy.

Adding support personnel as well as ship's crew, there are 140 personnel assigned or attached to Seawolf.

== History ==
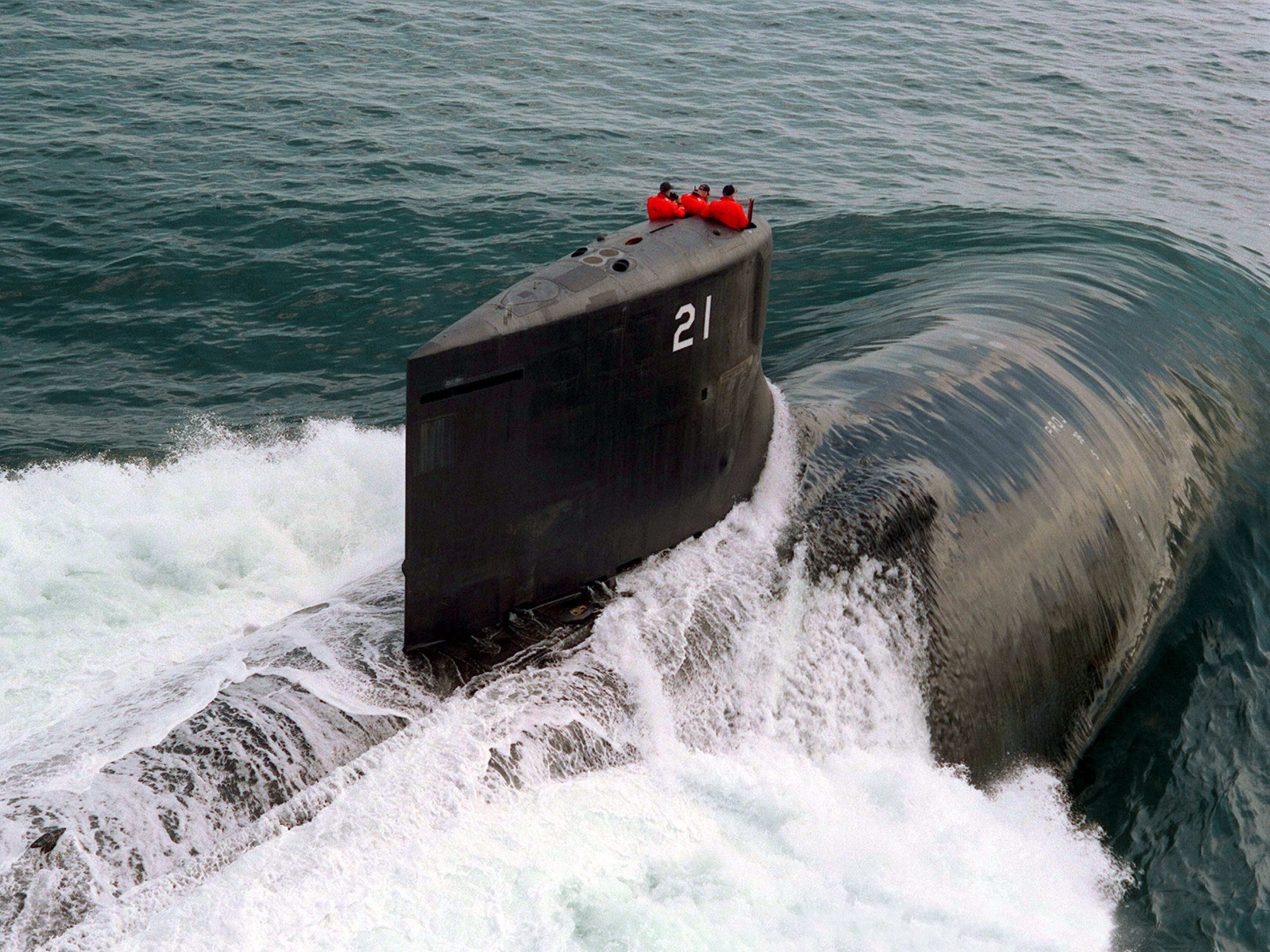
A surfaced Seawolf with her crew surveying her surroundings, 1996

Seawolf is featured in a 1998 episode of the documentary Super Structures of the World: Seawolf. The program followed her construction and sea trials.

On 22 July 2007, Seawolf transferred from her previous homeport of Naval Submarine Base New London in Groton, Connecticut, to Naval Base Kitsap, Washington.

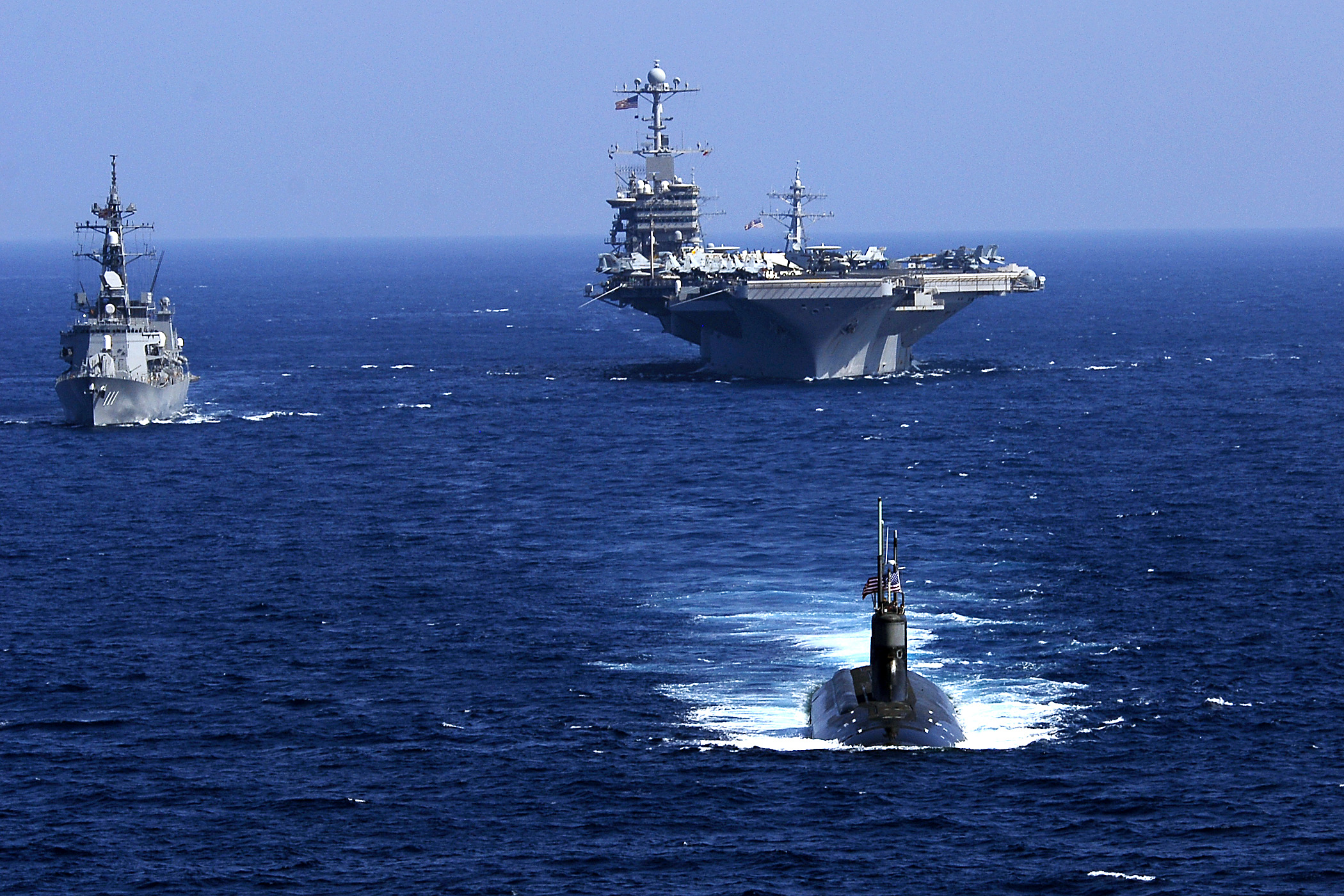
Seawolf leads USS John C. Stennis and the Japanese destroyer JS Ōnami during an exercise in 2009

In 2015, Seawolf was deployed to the Arctic region for six months.

In July 2020 Seawolf deployed into the Arctic area of responsibility. She conducted special operations and pulled into multiple European ports. Port calls included HMNB Clyde in Faslane Scotland, and Gibraltar, and briefly in Tromsø, Norway. Seawolf's deployment was the first US Navy deployment during the coronavirus pandemic.

== Awards ==
1997

- Secretary of the Navy Letter of Commendation (1995–1997)

2001

- Battle Efficiency "E" Ribbon

2002

- Global War on Terrorism Expeditionary Medal (2002–2011)

2004

- Battle Efficiency "E" Ribbon

2007

- Tactical White "T"
- Battle Efficiency "E" Ribbon
- Marjorie Sterrett Battleship Fund Award
- Meritorious Unit Commendation

2009

- Navy Unit Commendation

2014

- Battle Efficiency "E" Ribbon
- Weapons "W"
- Navigation Red and Green "N"
- Supply Blue "E"
- Personnel "P"

2015

- Battle Efficiency "E" Ribbon
- Weapons "W"
- Navigation Red and Green "N"
- Supply Blue "E"
- Engineering Red "E"

2020

- Battle Efficiency "E" Ribbon
- Weapons "W"
- Navigation Red and Green "N"
- Supply Blue "E"
- Navy Expeditionary Medal
- Arctic Service Ribbon
- Navy and Marine Corps Sea Service Deployment Ribbon (2X)
- Navy Meritorious Unit Commendation
- Arleigh Burke Trophy
