= Submarine Squadron 17 =

Submarine Squadron Seventeen
- Active: 1 Jan 1981–present
- Country: United States of America
- Branch: United States Navy
- Part of: U.S. Pacific Fleet (USPACFLT)
- Garrison/HQ: Bangor, Washington

Commanders
- Current commander: Commodore - Captain Nathan Luther

Submarine Squadron 17 (also known as SUBRON 17) is a squadron of submarines of the United States Navy based in Bangor, Washington under the command of Captain Nathan Luther. The submarines that make up SUBRON 17 include:

- Commander, Submarine Squadron 17 (CSS 17):
  - Ohio-class submarines:
    - USS Henry M. Jackson (SSBN-730)
    - USS Alabama (SSBN-731)
    - USS Nevada (SSBN-733)
    - USS Kentucky (SSBN-737)
    - USS Nebraska (SSBN-739)
    - USS Maine (SSBN-741)
    - USS Louisiana (SSBN-743)

== See also ==
- History of the United States Navy
