= Omaha Trophy =

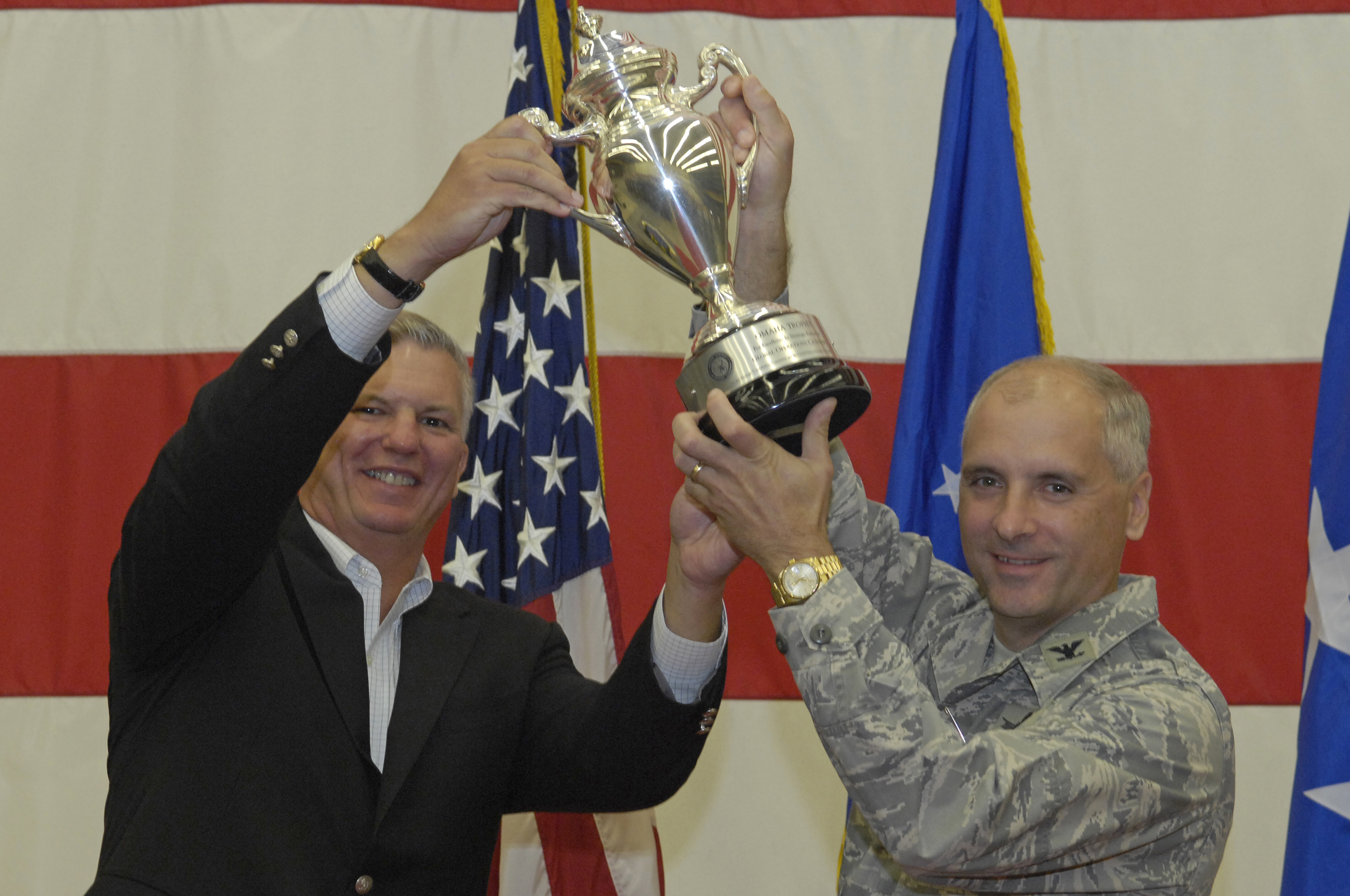
- Omaha Trophy being presented in 2009
- Awarded for: Excellence in strategic deterrence
- Country: United States
- Presented by: United States Strategic Command
- First award: 1971
- Website: http://www.stratcom.mil/

The Omaha Trophy, which is sponsored by the United States Strategic Command (STRATCOM) and the STRATCOM Consultation Committee, is awarded each year to U.S. military units with intercontinental ballistic missiles, strategic aircraft, strategic space and information operations, as well as to the best ballistic missile submarine. The trophy is currently presented in four official categories:

- Global Operations
- Intercontinental Ballistic Missile
- Strategic Bomber Operations
- Submarine Ballistic Missile

Selection for the award in each of the categories is based on formal evaluations, meritorious achievement, safety, and other factors, such as community involvement and humanitarian actions. This is then awarded to a notable person who has followed these values.

== History ==
The Omaha Trophy was created by the Strategic Command Consultation Committee, located in Omaha, Nebraska. The trophy was originally presented as a single trophy to a unit of the U.S. Air Force's Strategic Air Command (SAC) on behalf of the citizens of Omaha. The committee requested the trophy be presented annually to the command's best wing as a token of recognition and appreciation. It was first presented in 1971, with the number of awards increasing over the years as the U.S. Strategic Command's mission and structure changed. After the inactivation of Strategic Air Command and the creation of U.S. Strategic Command in 1992, the committee authorized two awards. One was for the best ICBM or fleet ballistic missile submarine unit, and the other was for the unified command's best strategic aviation unit. In 1998, the missile category was divided into two separate awards, with one to be presented to land-based units, and the other to sea-based missile units. In 2003, a fourth category was added. This new category was strategic space and information operations, which was used until 2006. It became the cyberspace category in 2007, and global operations in 2008.

The current award of the Omaha Trophy reflects the command's primary missions, emphasis on strategic deterrence, and evolving role in global operations. The trophy rotates between installations annually. Officials present a miniature, replica trophy or plaque and certificate to each winning unit after the presentation trophy has been returned at the beginning of the next competitive cycle.

Omaha Trophy Winners
Category	Intercontinental Ballistic Missile	Ballistic Missile Submarine	Strategic Bomber	Strategic Aircraft	Global Operations
2005	90th Missile Wing F.E. Warren Air Force Base, Wyoming	USS Alaska (SSBN 732) Naval Base Kitsap, Washington		5th Bomb Wing Minot AFB, North Dakota	Joint Space Operations Center Vandenberg AFB, California
2006	90th Missile Wing F.E. Warren Air Force Base, Wyoming	USS Louisiana (SSBN-743) Naval Base Kitsap, Washington		509th Bomb Wing Whiteman Air Force Base, Missouri	Joint Task Force Global Network Operations Arlington, Virginia
2007	*Awarded as the Deterrence Operation Trophy 341st Space Wing Malmstrom Air Force Base, Great Falls, Montana		*Awarded as the Space Operations Trophy Joint Space Operations Center (JSPOC) Vandenberg Air Force Base, Lompoc, California		*Awarded as the Cyberspace Trophy Joint Functional Component Command – Network Warfare (JFCC-NW), Fort Meade, Maryland
2008		USS Maryland (SSBN-738) Naval Submarine Base Kings Bay, Georgia		Strategic Communications Wing One Tinker AFB, Oklahoma	
2009	341st Space Wing Malmstrom Air Force Base, Montana	USS Kentucky (SSBN-737) Naval Submarine Base, Bangor, Washington		55th Wing Offutt Air Force Base, Nebraska	67th Network Warfare Wing Lackland Air Force Base, Texas
2010	91st Missile Wing Minot Air Force Base, North Dakota	USS Rhode Island (SSBN-740) Naval Submarine Base, Kings Bay, Ga.		5th Bomb Wing Minot AFB, North Dakota	50th Space Wing Schriever Air Force Base, Colorado
2011	90th Missile Wing F.E. Warren Air Force Base, Wyoming	USS Alaska (SSBN 732) Naval Submarine Base Kings Bay, Georgia		55th Wing Offutt Air Force Base, Nebraska	67th Network Warfare Wing Lackland Air Force Base, Texas
2012	90th Missile Wing F.E. Warren Air Force Base, Wyoming	USS Alaska (SSBN 732) Naval Submarine Base Kings Bay, Georgia		Strategic Communications Wing One Tinker AFB, Oklahoma	50th Space Wing Schriever Air Force Base, Colorado
2013	90th Missile Wing F.E. Warren Air Force Base, Wyoming	USS Nebraska (SSBN 739) Naval Base Kitsap-Bangor, Washington		509th Bomb Wing Whiteman Air Force Base, Missouri	67th Cyberspace Wing Joint Base San Antonio-Lackland, San Antonio, Texas
2014	91st Missile Wing Minot Air Force Base, North Dakota	USS Alaska (SSBN 732) Naval Submarine Base Kings Bay, Georgia			50th Space Wing Schriever Air Force Base, Colorado
2015	341st Missile Wing Malmstrom Air Force Base, Montana	USS Wyoming (SSBN 742) Naval Submarine Base Kings Bay, Georgia	2nd Bomb Wing Barksdale Air Force Base, Louisiana	92nd Air Refueling Wing Fairchild Air Force Base, Washington	460th Space Wing Buckley Air Force Base, Colorado
2016	90th Missile Wing F.E. Warren Air Force Base, Wyoming	USS Alaska (SSBN 732) Naval Submarine Base Kings Bay, Georgia	5th Bomb Wing Minot Air Force Base, North Dakota	92nd Air Refueling Wing Fairchild Air Force Base, Washington	21st Space Wing Peterson Air Force Base, Colorado
2017	341st Missile Wing Malmstrom AFB, Montana	USS Alabama (SSBN 731) Naval Base Kitsap-Bangor, Washington	509th and 131st Bomb Wings Whiteman AFB, Missouri	Strategic Communications Wing One Tinker AFB, Oklahoma	460th Space Wing Buckley AFB, Colorado
2018	341st Missile Wing Malmstrom AFB, Montana	USS Nevada (SSBN-733) Naval Submarine Base Bangor, Washington	509th and 131st Bomb Wing Whiteman AFB, Missouri	117th Air Refueling Wing Sumpter Smith Air National Guard Base, Alabama	21st Space Wing Peterson AFB, Colorado
2019	91st Missile Wing Minot AFB, North Dakota	USS Alaska (SSBN-732) Naval Submarine Base Kings Bay, Georgia	5th Bomb Wing Minot AFB, North Dakota	Wing One Task Group 114.2 Tinker AFB, Oklahoma	100th Missile Defense Brigade Schriever AFB, Colorado
2020	90th Operations Support Squadron F.E. Warren AFB, Wyoming	USS Henry M. Jackson (SSBN-730) Naval Base Kitsap-Bangor, Washington	96th Bomb Squadron Barksdale AFB, Louisiana		Fleet Air Reconnaissance Squadron FOUR Tinker AFB, Oklahoma
2021	12th Missile Squadron, Malmstrom AFB, Montana	USS Alaska (SSBN-732) Naval Submarine Base Kings Bay, Georgia	509th Operations Support Squadron, Whiteman AFB, Missouri		Fleet Air Reconnaissance Squadron FOUR Tinker AFB, Oklahoma
2022	40th Helicopter Squadron Malmstrom AFB, Montana	USS Rhode Island (SSBN-740) Naval Submarine Base Kings Bay, Georgia	37th Bomb Squadron Ellsworth AFB, South Dakota		Fleet Air Reconnaissance Squadron 4 (United States Navy) Tinker AFB, Oklahoma
2023	341st Missile Wing Malmstrom AFB, Montana	USS Kentucky (SSBN-737) Naval Submarine Base Bangor, Washington	2nd Bomb Wing Barksdale AFB, Louisiana		92nd Air Refueling Wing Fairchild AFB, Washington
2024	91st Missile Wing Minot AFB, North Dakota	USS Tennessee (SSBN-734) Naval Submarine Base Kings Bay, Georgia	509th Bomb Wing Whiteman AFB, Missouri		171st Air Refueling Wing Coraopolis, Pennsylvania

=== Omaha Trophy Honor Wall ===
U.S. Strategic Command (USSTRATCOM) and the Strategic Command Consultation Committee (SCC) unveiled the Omaha Trophy Honor Wall at USSTRATCOM headquarters on March 14, 2022. The Omaha Trophy Honor Wall showcases 125 patches from every unit that has received the award in chronological order with room for future recipient units.
