= USS Louisiana (SSBN-743) =

Submarine of the United States

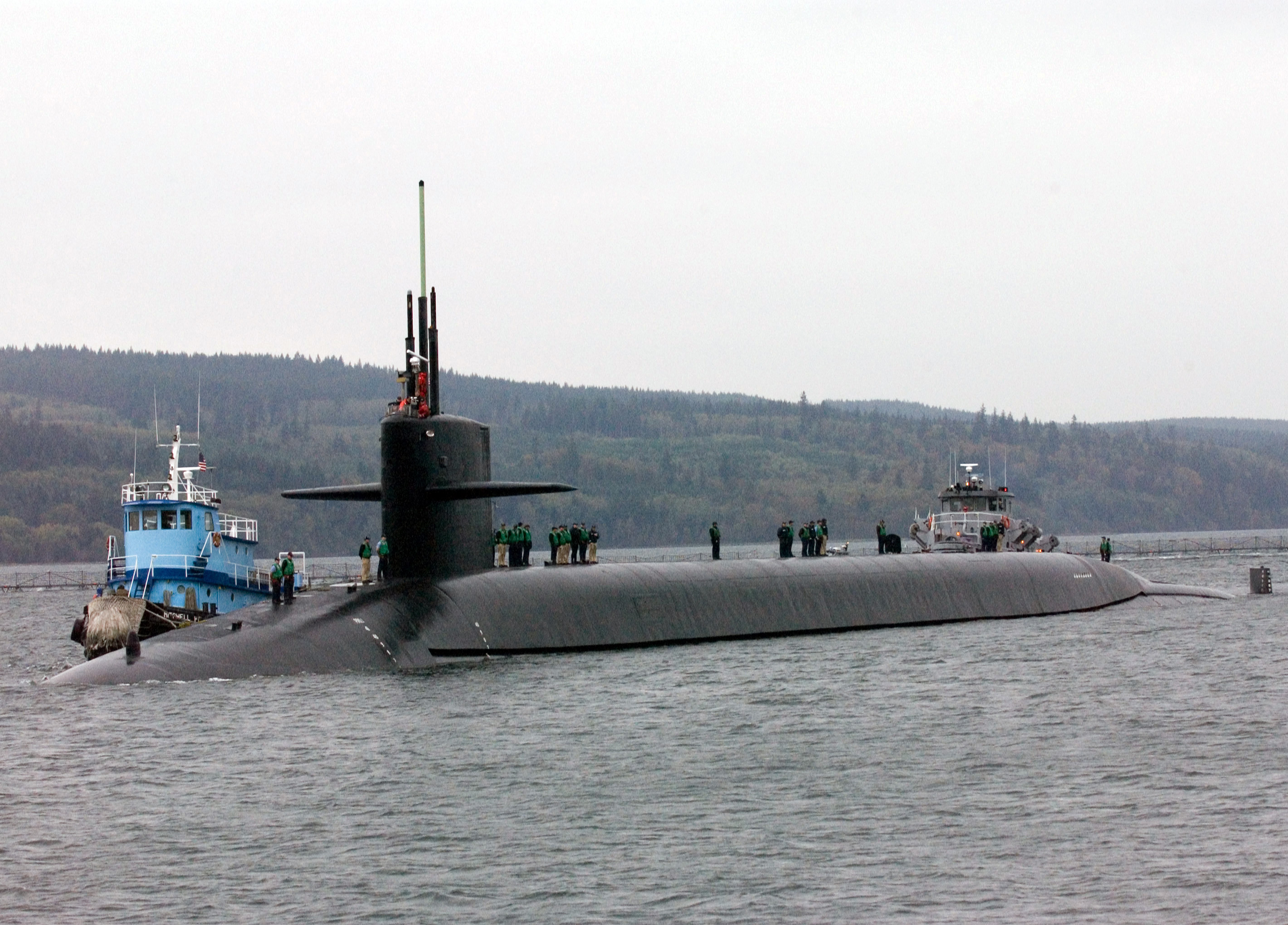
- USS Louisiana (SSBN-743) arriving for the first time at her new home port at Naval Base Kitsap in Bangor, Washington, on 12 October 2005.

History

United States
- Name: Louisiana
- Namesake: Louisiana
- Ordered: 19 December 1990
- Builder: General Dynamics Electric Boat
- Laid down: 23 October 1992
- Launched: 27 July 1996
- Commissioned: 6 September 1997
- Home port: Bremerton, Washington
- Motto: Union, Justice, and Confidence
- Honors and awards: Omaha Trophy 2006; Meritorious Unit Commendation (Blue Crew) 2009; Meritorious Unit Commendation (Gold Crew) 2009
- Status: in active service
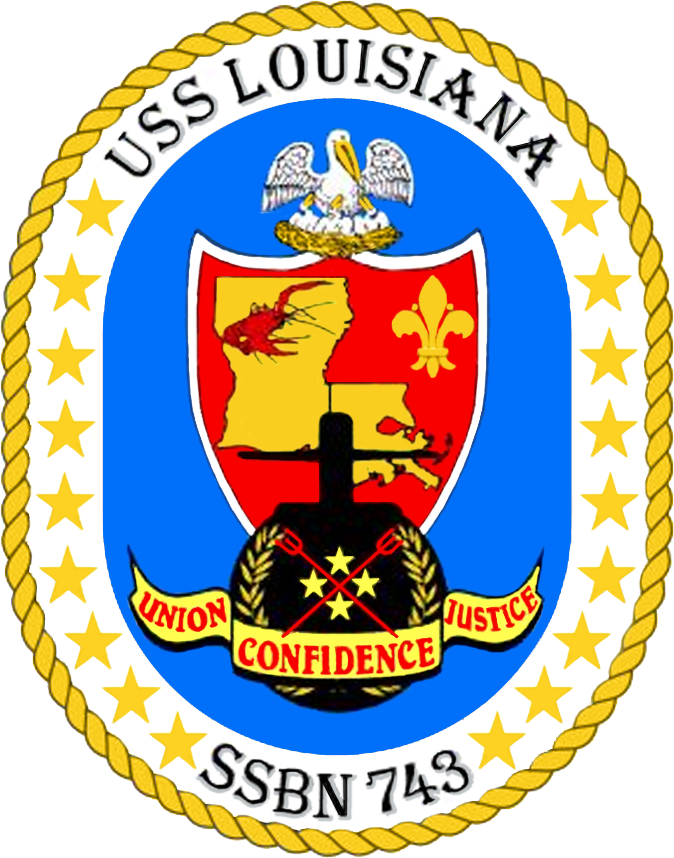
- Badge

General characteristics
- Class & type: Ohio class ballistic missile submarine
- Displacement: 16,764 long tons (17,033 t) surfaced; 18,750 long tons (19,050 t) submerged
- Length: 560 ft (170 m)
- Beam: 42 ft (13 m)
- Draft: 38 ft (12 m)
- Propulsion: 1 × S8G PWR nuclear reactor (HEU 93.5%); 2 × geared turbines; 1 × 325 hp (242 kW) auxiliary motor; 1 × shaft @ 60,000 shp (45,000 kW)
- Speed: Greater than 25 knots (46 km/h; 29 mph)
- Test depth: Greater than 800 feet (240 m)
- Complement: 15 officers; 140 enlisted
- Armament: MK-48 torpedoes; 20 × Trident II D-5 ballistic missiles

USS Louisiana (hull number SSBN-743) is the 18th and last boat of the United States Navy's Ohio class of nuclear-powered fleet ballistic missile submarines. She carries Trident ballistic missiles and has been in commission since 1997. She is the fourth commissioned ship to bear the name of the U.S. state of Louisiana.

== Construction and commissioning ==
The contract for the construction of Louisiana was awarded on 19 December 1990 and her keel was laid down at the Electric Boat Division of General Dynamics in Groton, Connecticut, on 23 October 1992. She was launched on 27 July 1996, sponsored by Patricia O'Keefe, and commissioned on 6 September 1997 at Naval Submarine Base Kings Bay at Kings Bay, Georgia.

== Service history ==
=== Atlantic Fleet operations ===
Louisiana's first home port was Kings Bay. Her commissioning gave Kings Bay its planned full complement of 10 ballistic missile submarines.

=== Transfer to Pacific Fleet ===
In the 1990s, with the end of the Cold War and the subsequent reorganization of U.S. military forces, a U.S. nuclear policy review recommended that the U.S. Navy reduce its inventory of Ohio-class fleet ballistic missile submarines from 18 to 14 by 2005. An original plan to meet this goal by retiring the four oldest Ohio-class submarines — Ohio, Michigan, Florida, and Georgia — was abandoned. Instead, those four were converted into cruise missile submarines (SSGNs). The conversions reduced the size of the Trident-equipped ballistic missile submarine fleet to 14 units. In order to balance the remaining Trident-equipped fleet between the United States Atlantic Fleet and United States Pacific Fleet, five Ohio-class submarines relocated from the Atlantic to the Pacific. Between 2002 and 2005, Pennsylvania, Kentucky, Nebraska, Maine, and Louisiana relocated from Kings Bay to Naval Base Kitsap.

=== Pacific Fleet operations ===
==== 2016 collision ====
On 18 August 2016, Louisiana collided with USNS Eagleview, a submarine and special warfare support vessel, while conducting operations in the Strait of Juan de Fuca. Both vessels returned to their respective home ports under their own power. Damage to Louisiana was limited to her forward starboard hull.

== Awards ==
=== 2006 Omaha Trophy ===
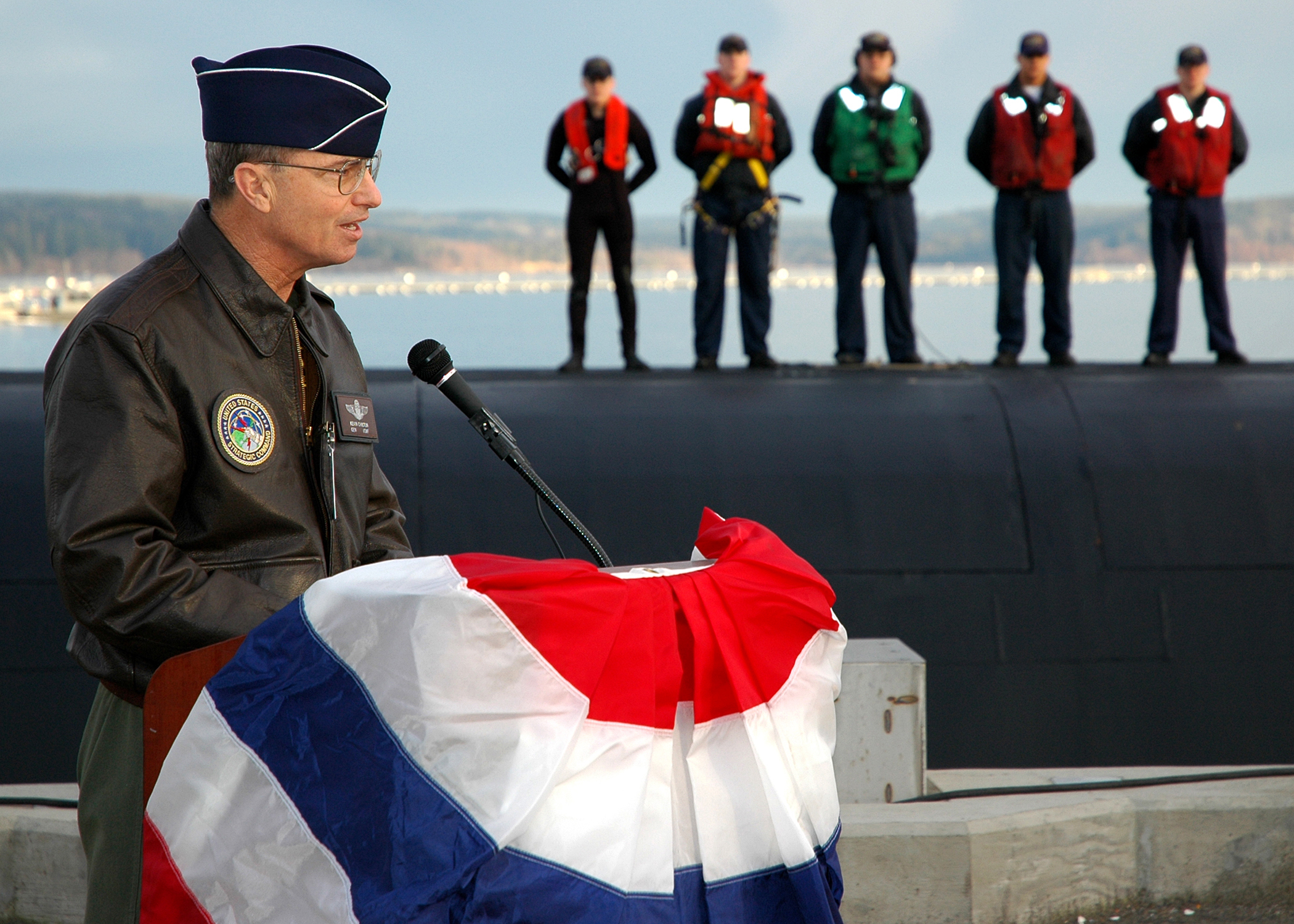
Louisiana receiving the 2006 Omaha Trophy in 2007.

The Strategic Air Command Consultation Committee presented the Omaha Trophy to the Strategic Air Command (SAC) in 1971 on behalf of the citizens of Omaha, Nebraska, with the request that it be awarded annually to the outstanding SAC wing; the award later grew to include four different categories, including Intercontinental Ballistic Missile Command, Strategic Aircraft Operations Command, Strategic Space and Information Operations Command, and Submarine Ballistic Missile Command. On 31 May 2007, United States Strategic Command announced that Louisiana had won the 2006 Omaha Trophy in the Submarine Ballistic Missile Command category, which recognizes excellence in the fleet and is presented annually to the ballistic missile submarine unit demonstrating the highest standards of performance; in order for Louisiana to receive the award, both her Blue Crew and Gold Crew had to achieve excellence in every category possible from loading weapons to tactical scenarios related to strategic warfare to sailor retention and crew morale, with selection for the award based on formal evaluations, meritorious achievement, safety, and other factors such as community involvement and humanitarian actions. General Kevin P. Chilton, commander of the U.S. Strategic Command, presented the trophy to Louisiana's crew.

=== 2009 Meritorious Unit Commendation ===
Both the Blue and Gold crews of Louisiana received the Meritorious Unit Commendation from the Chief of Naval Operations, Admiral Gary Roughead on 17 February 2009 during an all-hands call while he was visiting Naval Base Kitsap. The award was based on a recognition that both crews collectively had performed service of a character comparable in a non-combat situation to that which would merit the award of a Bronze Star Medal, or an award of like caliber, to an individual in a combat situation. Louisiana was specifically recognized for meritorious service and superior performance across the spectrum of strategic submarine operations, setting fleet standards of excellence for administration, engineering, supply, personnel programs, and community support. Louisiana was the first ballistic missile submarine to be awarded the Meritorious Unit Commendation since 2001.

== Ship's crest ==
Louisiana's crest recalls the traditions of the people of the state of Louisiana and the three previous U.S. Navy ships to bear the name Louisiana. The symbolism of the crest reminds both crews of their bond to the people and history of Louisiana, as well as the tradition of the naval veterans who have served aboard ships of the same name. To others, the crest serves as a statement that the crews carry forward and those traditions of faithful and excellent service.

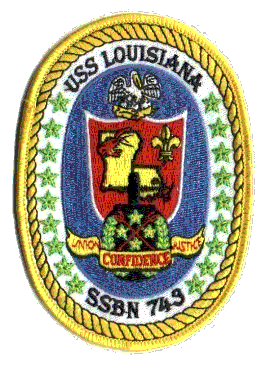
USS Louisiana's patch, which closely resembles the ship's crest.

The gold braid encircling the seal represents commitment of the two crews to the values of pride, patriotism, honor, and tradition. The 18 stars surrounding the crest identify Louisiana as the 18th state of the Union and Louisiana as the 18th Ohio-class submarine. The Louisiana state bird, the pelican, is shown protecting her young with outstretched wings; the pelican, as legend has it, is the only bird known to give its own flesh to feed its young when it is unable to find food, and this signifies the mission of Louisiana and her two crews to defend, at all costs, the freedoms and values that America represents.

The red, white, and blue colors in the crest symbolize Louisiana's duty to the nation. The crest also includes the gold, white, and blue of the state of Louisiana to recall the submarine's name's origins. Additionally, the dark blue and gold in the crest traditionally associated with the United States Navy represent excellence and the sea, and also symbolizes the two crews — Blue Crew and Gold Crew — of Louisiana. The bow-on perspective of the modern Ohio-class submarine is meant to be striking, bold, and steadfast in its appearance, serving as a warning of Louisiana's resolute commitment to defending freedom.

The four stars on the submarine's bow indicate that Louisiana the fourth U.S. Navy ship to bear the name. The laurel symbolizes each crew member's commitment to honorable service to their country and ship. The tridents symbolize naval weaponry, both past and present, and sea prowess. Their bottom spikes pierce the Louisiana state motto, anchoring it, while pointing toward the ocean depths where the ship patrols. An iris with three petals was once the armorial emblem of French sovereigns, and it is often used as a symbol of the state of Louisiana; here it represents France's strong influence on the State of Louisiana. The banner with the inscription "Union, Justice, and Confidence" proclaims the Louisiana state motto. Wrapping the banner around the ship symbolizes the crew's strong esprit de corps with the people of the state of Louisiana. The crawfish further symbolizes the cultural heritage of the people of the state of Louisiana.
