= USS Rhode Island (SSBN-740) =

Submarine of the United States

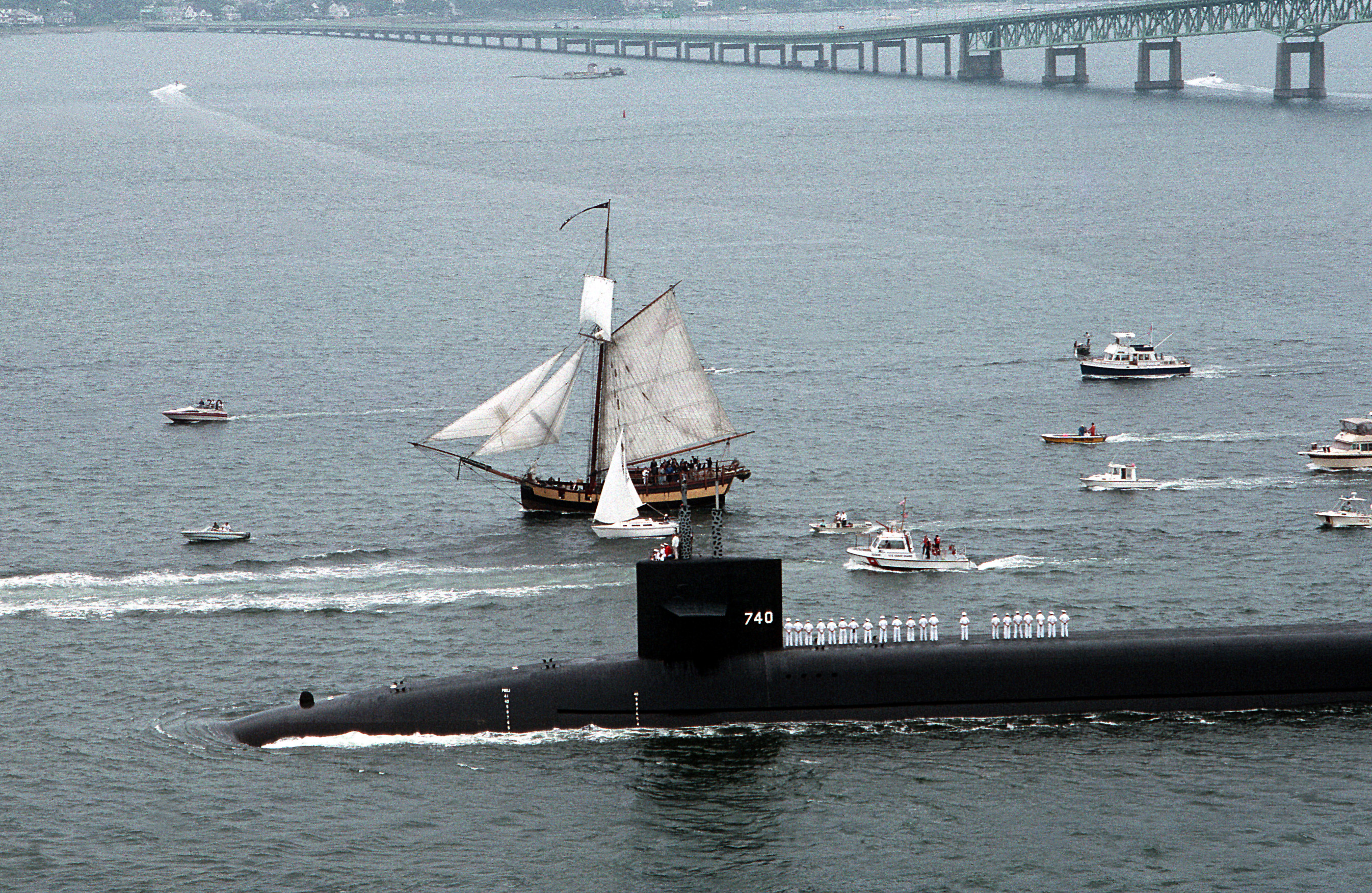
- USS Rhode Island (SSBN-740)

History

United States
- Name: USS Rhode Island
- Namesake: The U.S. state of Rhode Island
- Ordered: 5 January 1988
- Builder: General Dynamics Electric Boat, Groton, Connecticut
- Laid down: 15 September 1988
- Launched: 17 July 1993
- Sponsored by: Mrs. Kati Machtley
- Commissioned: 9 July 1994
- Home port: Kings Bay, Georgia
- Motto: In Spe Pacis Perennis; ("In hope of everlasting peace")
- Status: in active service
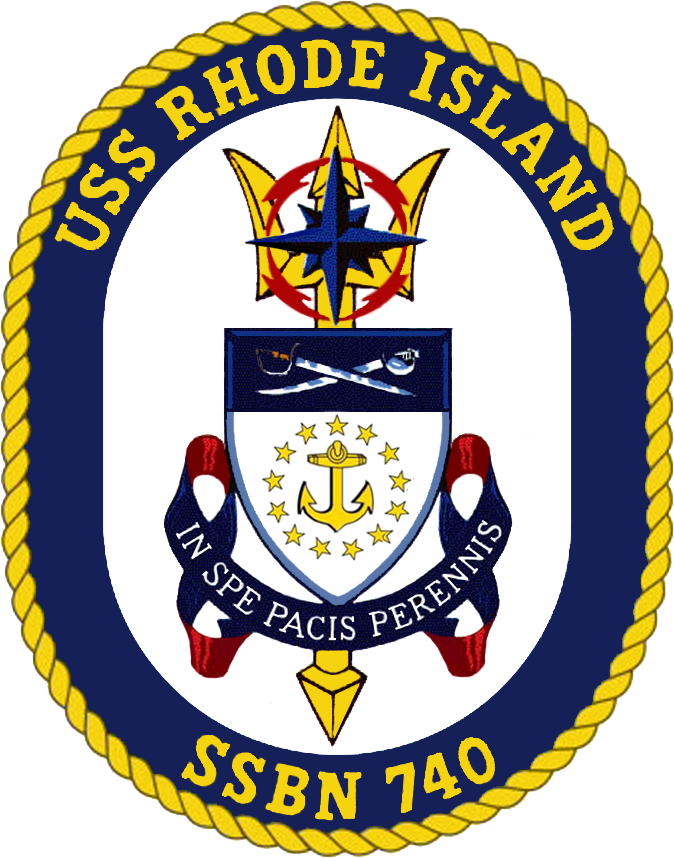
- Badge

General characteristics
- Class & type: Ohio-class ballistic missile submarine
- Displacement: 16,764 long tons (17,033 t) surfaced; 18,750 long tons (19,050 t) submerged
- Length: 560 ft (170 m)
- Beam: 42 ft (13 m)
- Draft: 38 ft (12 m)
- Propulsion: 1 × S8G PWR nuclear reactor (HEU 93.5%); 2 × geared turbines; 1 × 325 hp (242 kW) auxiliary motor; 1 × shaft @ 60,000 shp (45,000 kW)
- Speed: Greater than 25 knots (46 km/h; 29 mph)
- Test depth: Greater than 800 feet (240 m)
- Complement: 15 officers; 140 enlisted
- Armament: MK-48 torpedoes; 20 × Trident II D-5 ballistic missiles

USS Rhode Island (hull number SSBN-740) is a United States Navy Ohio-class ballistic missile submarine which has been in commission since 1994. She is the third U.S. Navy ship to be named for Rhode Island, the 13th state.

== Construction and commissioning ==
Originally, another Ohio-class submarine, SSBN-730, was to have been named Rhode Island; a contract was awarded in 1977 for SSBN-730's construction and her keel was laid in 1981 with the name Rhode Island planned for the completed submarine. However, shortly after the sudden death of United States Senator Henry M. Jackson of Washington, SSBN-730 was renamed Henry M. Jackson while still under construction. The name Rhode Island was transferred to SSBN-740, for which a construction contract had not yet been awarded.

The contract to build Rhode Island (SSBN-740) was awarded to the Electric Boat Division of General Dynamics Corporation in Groton, Connecticut, on 5 January 1988 and her keel was laid down there on 15 September 1988. She was launched on 17 July 1993, sponsored by Mrs. Kati Machtley, and commissioned on 9 July 1994, with Captain John K. Eldridge commanding the Blue Crew and Commander Michael Maxfield commanding the Gold Crew.

== Service history ==
On 11 August 2009, Rhode Island rescued five Bahamian fishermen whose boat had capsized on 7 August 2009. Rhode Island's medical staff tended to the four men and one boy before transferring them to a ship which took them to shore for further treatment.

In 2010 Rhode Island was awarded the Battle "E" for Squadron 20. In 2011 Rhode Island was awarded the Omaha Trophy in recognition for superior performance and setting fleet standards in the field of strategic deterrence.

From December 2015 to August 2018, Rhode Island was in Norfolk Naval Shipyard undergoing an Engineered Refueling Overhaul, in which her reactor was refueled and numerous other systems modernized.

On 1 November 2022, Rhode Island arrived at Gibraltar for a scheduled port visit.

== USS Rhode Island in popular culture ==
On 8 May 2007, Rhode Island was named the "official ballistic missile submarine" of the American satirical television show The Colbert Report after crew members submitted photos of a "Colbert Nation" poster taken in different locations aboard the vessel. The connection to the show was made through one of the sailors who was engaged to Stephen Colbert's cousin.
