= USS Henry M. Jackson =

United States Navy submarine

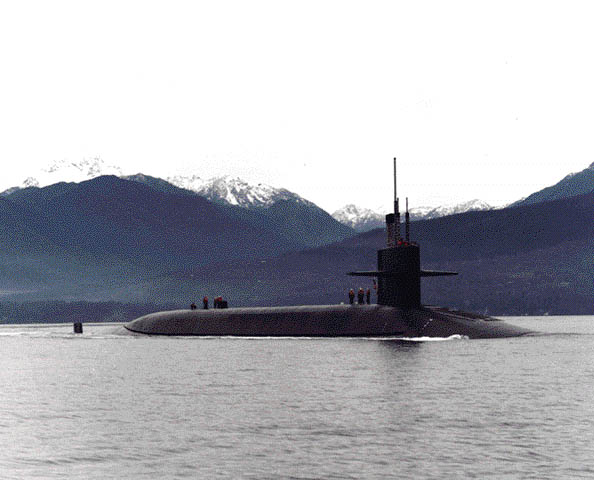
- USS Henry M. Jackson (SSBN-730)

History

United States
- Name: Rhode Island (1981–1983); Henry M. Jackson (1983–present)
- Namesake: U.S. Senator Henry M. Jackson (1912–1983)
- Ordered: 6 June 1977
- Builder: General Dynamics Electric Boat, Groton, Connecticut
- Laid down: 19 January 1981
- Launched: 15 October 1983
- Commissioned: 6 October 1984
- Home port: Bangor, Washington
- Motto: Defender of Freedom
- Status: in active service
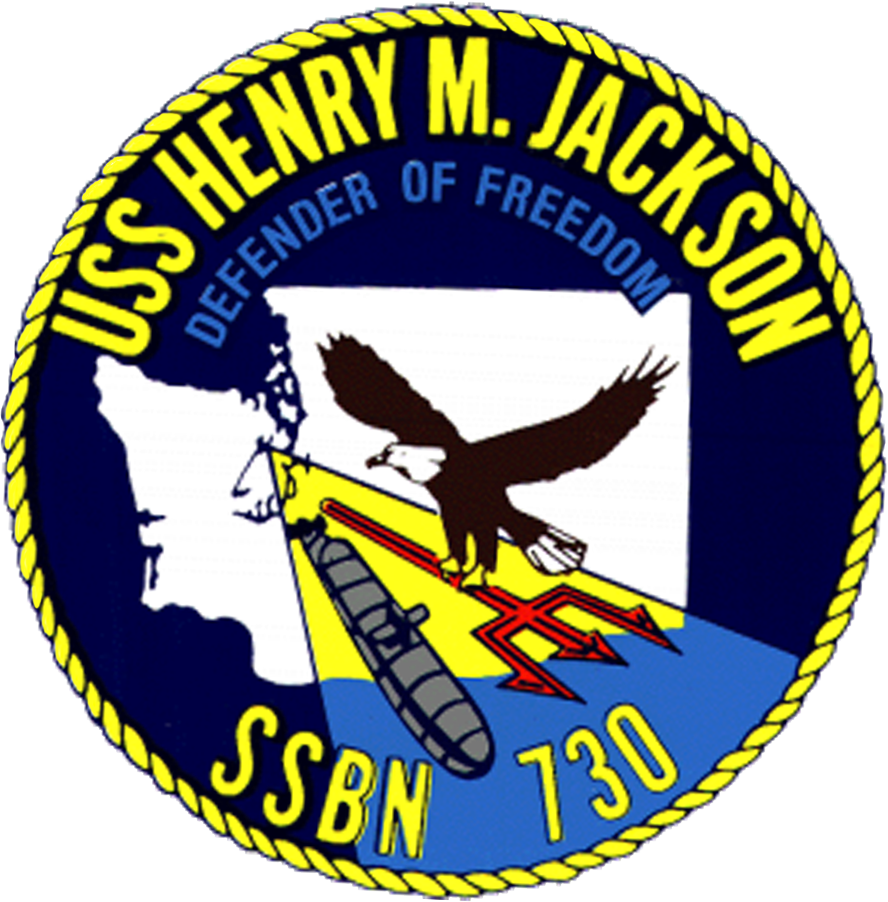
- Badge

General characteristics
- Class & type: Ohio-class
- Displacement: 16,764 long tons (17,033 t) surfaced; 18,750 long tons (19,050 t) submerged
- Length: 560 ft (170 m)
- Beam: 42 ft (13 m)
- Draft: 38 ft (12 m)
- Propulsion: 1 × S8G PWR nuclear reactor (HEU 93.5%); 2 × geared turbines; 1 × 325 hp (242 kW) auxiliary motor; 1 × shaft @ 60,000 shp (45,000 kW)
- Speed: Greater than 25 knots (46 km/h; 29 mph)
- Test depth: Greater than 800 feet (240 m)
- Complement: 15 officers; 140 enlisted
- Armament: MK-48 torpedoes; 20 × Trident II D-5 ballistic missiles

USS Henry M. Jackson (hull number SSBN-730) is an Ohio-class, nuclear-powered ballistic missile submarine, in commission with the United States Navy since 1984. She is named for US Senator Henry M. Jackson of the state of Washington, and is the only submarine of the class not named after a US state.

== Construction and commissioning ==
Henry M. Jackson originally was to have been named Rhode Island. The contract to build Rhode Island was awarded to the Electric Boat Division of General Dynamics Corporation at Groton, Connecticut, on 6 June 1977 and her keel was laid down there on 19 January 1981. Shortly after Senator Jackson suddenly died in office on 1 September 1983, the submarine was renamed Henry M. Jackson, with the name Rhode Island being transferred to a later boat in the class, with hull number SSBN-740.

Henry M. Jackson was launched on 15 October 1983, at Groton, Connecticut, sponsored by Senator Jackson's daughter, Ms. Anna Marie Jackson. The boat was commissioned on 6 October 1984. The ship's homeport is Naval Base Kitsap in Bremerton, Washington.

== Ship's history ==
Since 1990, the submarine, known as the "Defender of Freedom" has been assigned primarily to the patrolling of the Pacific Ocean and the Middle Pacific. The US Navy reported that: "On May 15, 2012, Henry M. Jackson became the first Ohio-class SSBN to complete 80 Trident strategic deterrent patrols."

As of 2026, SSBN 730 is the oldest Trident submarine conducting strategic deterrent patrols.

== Awards ==
Henry M Jackson was awarded the 2020 Battle Efficiency "E" for Submarine Squadron Seventeen. The Battle Efficiency E Award recognizes a command's outstanding performance and overall readiness to carry out its assigned wartime tasks.

Henry M Jackson's Blue crew was awarded the 2020 Hugh McCracken award for the "Best CPO Mess" in the Pacific Submarine Fleet.

Henry M Jackson was awarded the 2020 Omaha Trophy in recognition of their outstanding support to USSTRATCOM's Strategic Deterrence mission.

== Public affairs ==
The crew of Henry M. Jackson is very active in volunteer work, and has adopted a highway and donated time to the Salvation Army, among many other activities.
