= 91st Missile Wing LGM-30 Minuteman missile launch sites =

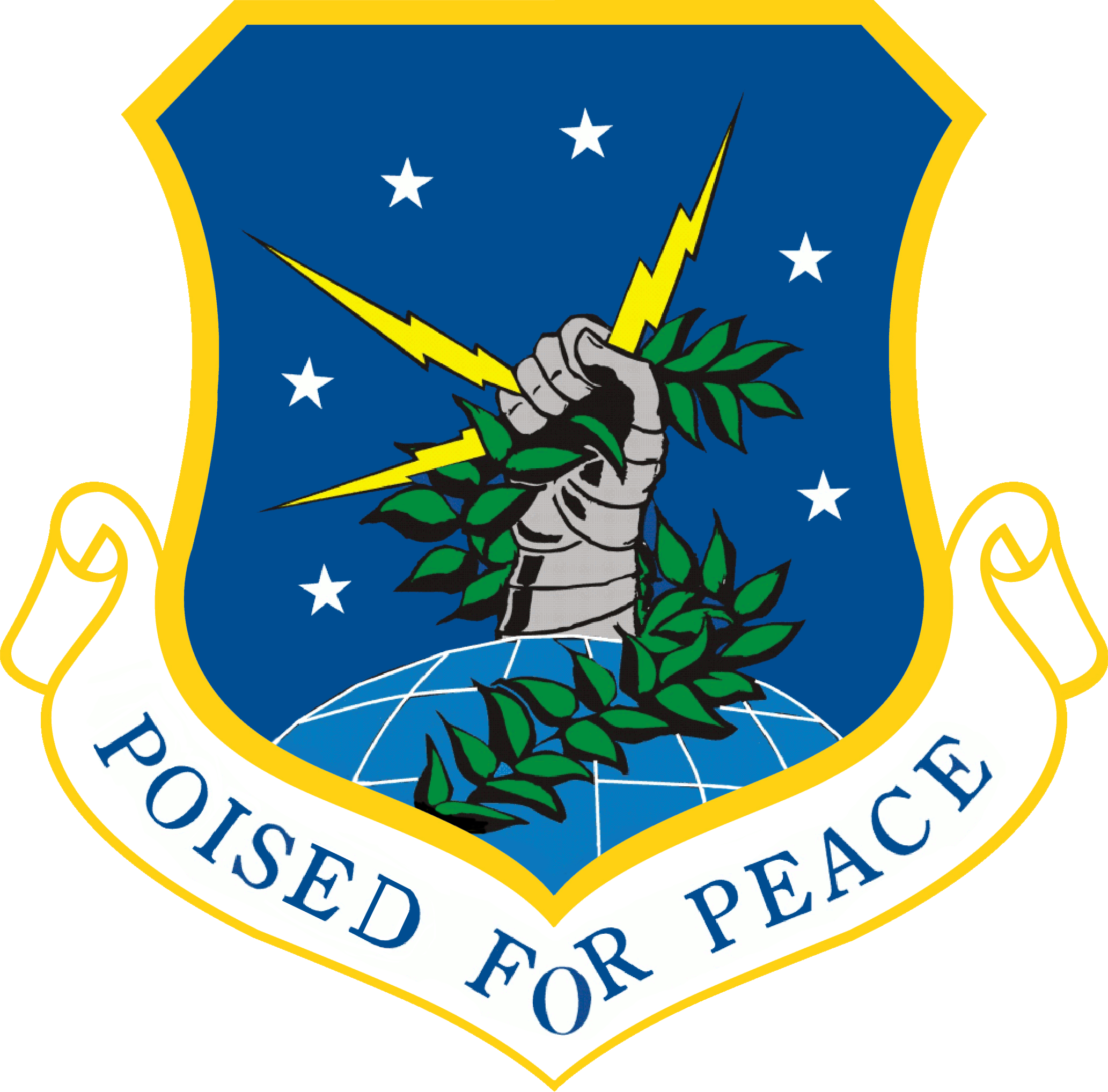
Emblem of the 91st Missile Wing

This is a list of the LGM-30 Minuteman missile Missile Alert Facilities and Launch Facilities of the 91st Missile Wing, 20th Air Force, assigned to Minot AFB, North Dakota.

== Overview ==
In November 1962, the 455th Strategic Missile Wing was the fourth United States Air Force LGM-30 Minuteman ICBM wing, the third with the LGM-30B Minuteman I. In 1962 and 1963 150 missiles were deployed to silos controlled by three squadrons of 455th in North Dakota. On 25 June 1968 the 91st Bombardment Wing was reassigned to Minot AFB from Glasgow AFB, Montana which was closed and assumed control of the three Minuteman squadrons of the 455th. The senior 91st SMW had organizational roots dating from World War II and had been deployed from Glasgow AFB to Southeast Asia, where it had been flying combat missions with the B-52 Stratofortress during the Vietnam War. The 455th SMW was inactivated.

Between April 1970 and December 1971 the Minuteman I ICBMs were replaced with the LGM-30G Minuteman III. All of the 91st Wing's Minuteman III missiles were reduced from three warheads to a single warhead by START I between 1991 and 2001. The three active squadrons are commanded by the 91st Operations Group.

== Facilities ==
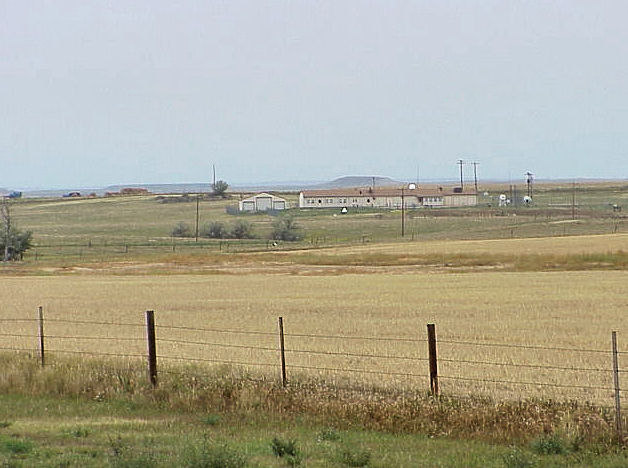
Missile Alert Facility

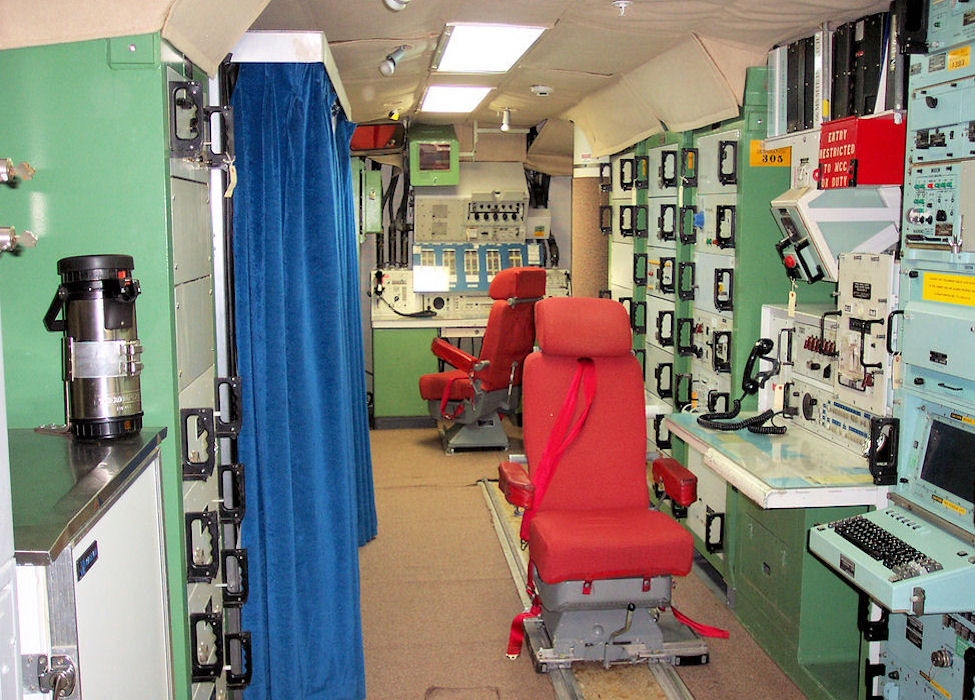
Launch Control Center

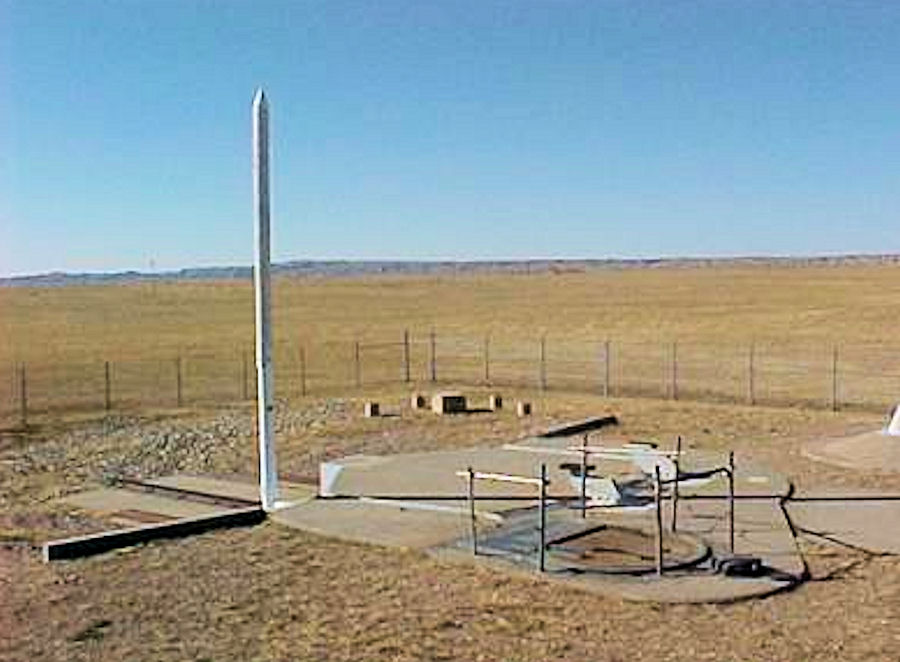
Minuteman III Launch Facility

The Missile Alert Facility (MAF) consists of a buried and hardened Launch Control Facility (LCC) and an above-ground Launch Control Support Building (LCSB). MAFs were formerly known as Launch Control Facilities (LCFs) but terminology was changed in 1992 with the inactivation of Strategic Air Command (SAC). In addition, a MAF has a landing pad for helicopters; a large radio tower; a large "top hat" HF antenna; a vehicle garage for security vehicles; recreational facilities, and one or two sewage lagoons. The entire site, except for the helicopter pad and sewage lagoons are secured with a fence and security personnel. About a dozen airmen and officers are assigned to a MAF.

The underground LCC Launch Control Center (LCC) contains the command and control equipment for missile operations. It is staffed by the two launch officers who have primary control and responsibility for the 10 underground and hardened Launch Facilities (LF)s within its flight which contains the operational missile. Each of the five LCCs also has the ability to command and monitor all 50 LFs within the squadron. The LF is unmanned, except when maintenance and security personnel are needed.

A squadron is composed of five flights; flights are denoted by a letter of the alphabet with the facilities controlled by the flight being designated by a number, 01 through 11, with 01 being the MAF.

== Units and locations ==
=== 740th Missile Squadron ===
Activated by Strategic Air Command on 28 June 1962. Organized on 1 November 1962

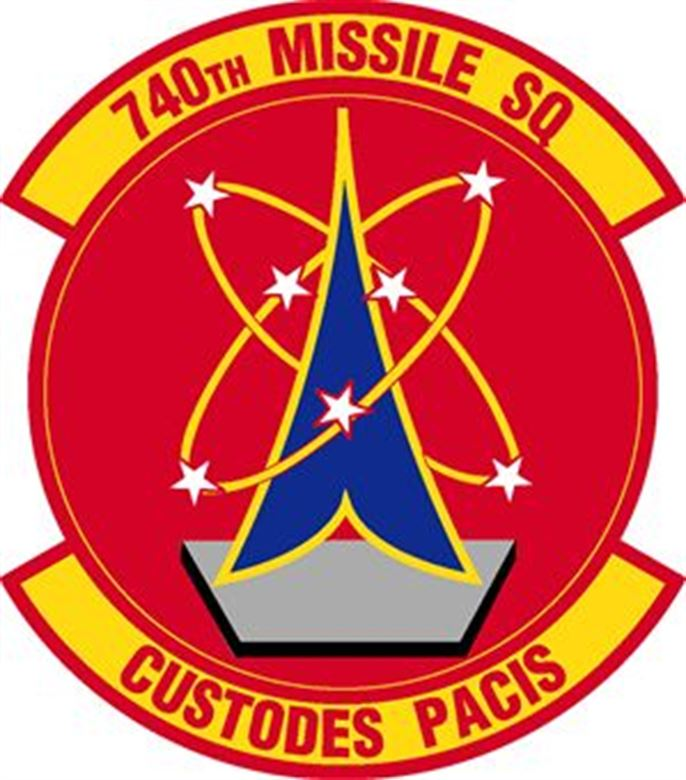
Emblem of the 740th Missile Squadron

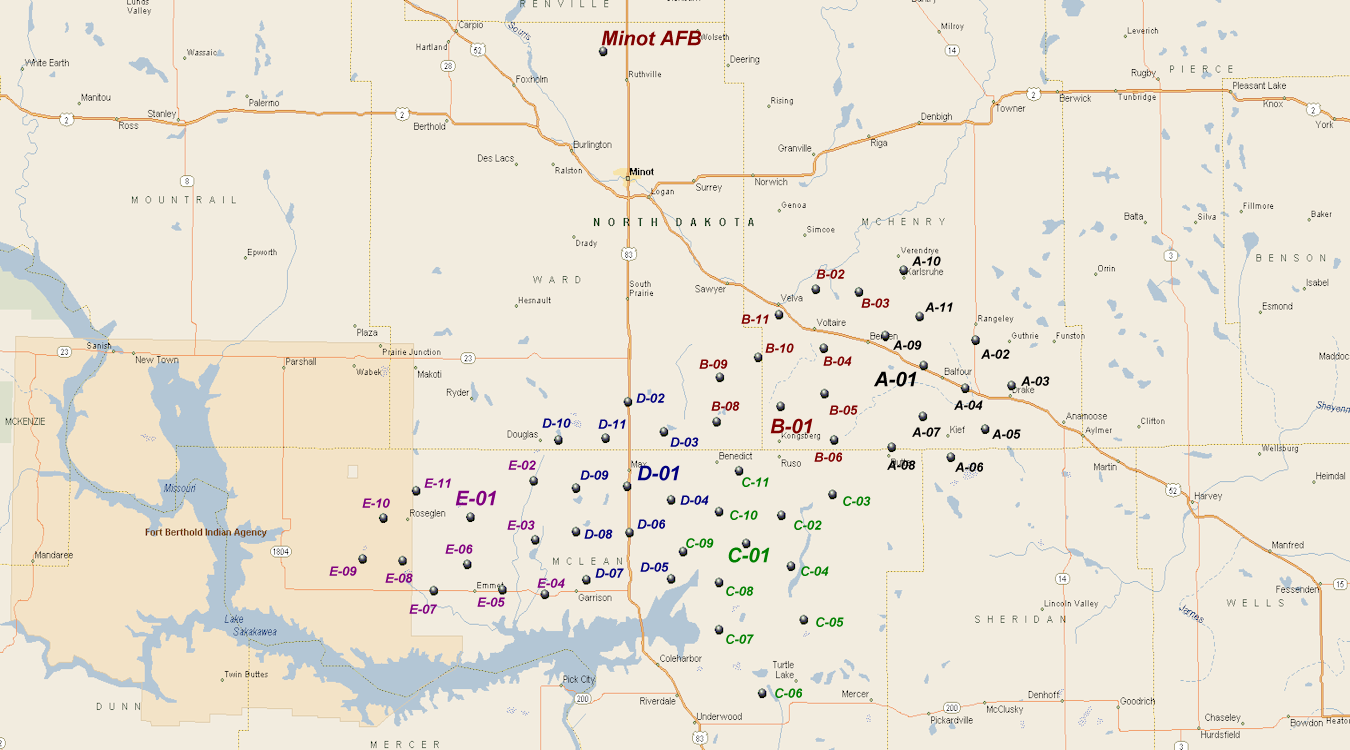
740th Missile Squadron – Missile Alert Facilities and Launch Facilities

- A-01 (MAF) 7.8 mi SxSE of Karlsruhe, N.D.; 46.0 mi SE of Minot AFB
  47°58′00″N 100°34′51″W

A-02 9.9 mi SE of Karlsruhe, N.D. 48°00′04″N 100°27′15″W
A-03 15.8 mi SE of Karlsruhe, N.D. 47°56′13″N 100°22′08″W
A-04 12.8 mi SxSE of Karlsruhe, N.D. 47°56′00″N 100°28′51″W
A-05 17.3 mi SxSE of Karlsruhe, N.D. 47°52′30″N 100°25′59″W
A-06 18.4 mi SxSE of Karlsruhe, N.D. 47°50′04″N 100°30′58″W
A-07 13.8 mi N of Karlsruhe, N.D. 47°53′37″N 100°35′01″W
A-08 16.8 mi S of Karlsruhe, N.D. 47°51′01″N 100°39′32″W
A-09 6.2 mi SxSW of Karlsruhe, N.D. 48°00′34″N 100°40′22″W
A-10 0.8 mi NxNW of Karlsruhe, N.D. 48°06′09″N 100°37′39″W
A-11 4.1 mi SxSE of Karlsruhe, N.D. 48°02′09″N 100°35′20″W

- B-01 (MAF) 10.5 mi S of Velva, N.D.; 38.9 mi SxSE of Minot AFB
  47°54′31″N 100°55′37″W

B-02 4.4 mi ExNE of Velva, N.D. 48°04′33″N 100°50′26″W
B-03 9.1 mi E of Velva, N.D. 48°04′17″N 100°44′08″W
B-04 6.9 mi SE of Velva, N.D. 47°59′32″N 100°49′16″W
B-05 10.5 mi SxSE of Velva, N.D. 47°55′38″N 100°49′15″W
B-06 15.1 mi SxSE of Velva, N.D. 47°51′41″N 100°47′55″W
B-07 15.8 mi S of Velva, N.D. 47°49′53″N 100°55′37″W
B-08 13.8 mi SxSW of Velva, N.D. 47°53′13″N 101°04′52″W
B-09 10.0 mi SW of Velva, N.D. 47°57′03″N 101°04′24″W
B-10 6.0 mi SxSW of Velva, N.D. 47°58′46″N 100°58′49″W
B-11 1.4 mi S of Velva, N.D. 48°02′22″N 100°55′51″W

- C-01 (MAF) 14.6 mi NxNW of Turtle Lake, N.D.; 49.8 mi SxSE of Minot AFB 47°42′52″N 101°00′36″W

C-02 16.2 mi N of Turtle Lake, N.D. 47°45′12″N 100°54′33″W
C-03 18.7 mi NxNE of Turtle Lake, N.D. 47°47′02″N 100°48′05″W
C-04 11.2 mi N of Turtle Lake, N.D. 47°40′52″N 100°54′14″W
C-05 5.9 mi N of Turtle Lake, N.D. 47°36′16″N 100°52′19″W
C-06 8.8 mi NxNW of Turtle Lake, N.D. 47°38′00″N 100°58′25″W
C-07 10.0 mi WxNW of Turtle Lake, N.D. 47°35′27″N 101°04′36″W
C-08 12.9 mi NW of Turtle Lake, N.D. 47°39′29″N 101°04′35″W
C-09 17.9 mi NW of Turtle Lake, N.D. 47°42′07″N 101°09′46″W
C-10 18.7 mi NxNW of Turtle Lake, N.D. 47°45′32″N 101°04′37″W
C-11 21.6 mi NxNW of Turtle Lake, N.D. 47°49′05″N 101°01′37″W

- D-01 (MAF) 1.8 mi S of Max, N.D.; 41.9 mi S of Minot AFB
  47°47′42″N 101°17′54″W

D-02 6.5 mi N of Max, N.D. 47°54′56″N 101°17′47″W
D-03 5.4 mi NE of Max, N.D. 47°52′26″N 101°12′33″W
D-04 5.8 mi ExSE of Max, N.D. 47°46′35″N 101°11′30″W
D-05 10.9 mi S of Max, N.D. 47°39′48″N 101°17′09″W
D-06 6.4 mi S of Max, N.D. 47°43′44″N 101°17′27″W
D-07 11.9 mi SxSW of Max, N.D. 47°39′43″N 101°23′42″W
D-08 8.5 mi SW of Max, N.D. 47°43′49″N 101°25′13″W
D-09 6.1 mi WxSW of Max, N.D. 47°47′33″N 101°25′14″W
D-10 8.2 mi WxNW of Max, N.D. 47°51′39″N 101°27′50″W
D-11 3.9 mi NW of Max, N.D. 47°51′51″N 101°21′00″W

- E-01 (MAF) 11.6 mi S of Ryder, N.D.; 47.5 mi SxSW of Minot AFB
  47°45′02″N 101°40′29″W

E-02 10.5 mi SE of Ryder, N.D. 47°48′12″N 101°31′25″W
E-03 15.6 mi SxSE of Ryder, N.D. 47°43′06″N 101°31′09″W
E-04 20.9 mi SxSE of Ryder, N.D. 47°38′26″N 101°29′45″W
E-05 19.0 mi S of Ryder, N.D. 47°38′52″N 101°35′50″W
E-06 16.2 mi S of Ryder, N.D. 47°41′00″N 101°40′53″W
E-07 19.3 mi SxSW of Ryder, N.D. 47°38′43″N 101°45′43″W
E-08 17.7 mi SxSW of Ryder, N.D. 47°41′14″N 101°50′16″W
E-09 20.0 mi SW of Ryder, N.D. 47°41′21″N 101°56′05″W
E-10 15.4 mi SW of Ryder, N.D. 47°44′52″N 101°53′07″W
E-11 10.9 mi SW of Ryder, N.D. 47°47′16″N 101°48′23″W

=== 741st Missile Squadron ===
Activated by Strategic Air Command on 28 June 1962. Organized on 1 December 1962

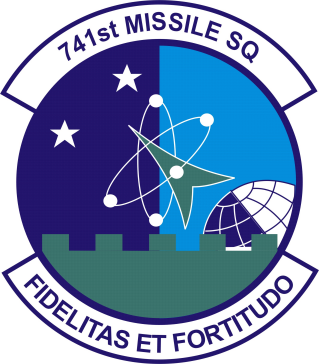
Emblem of the 741st Missile Squadron

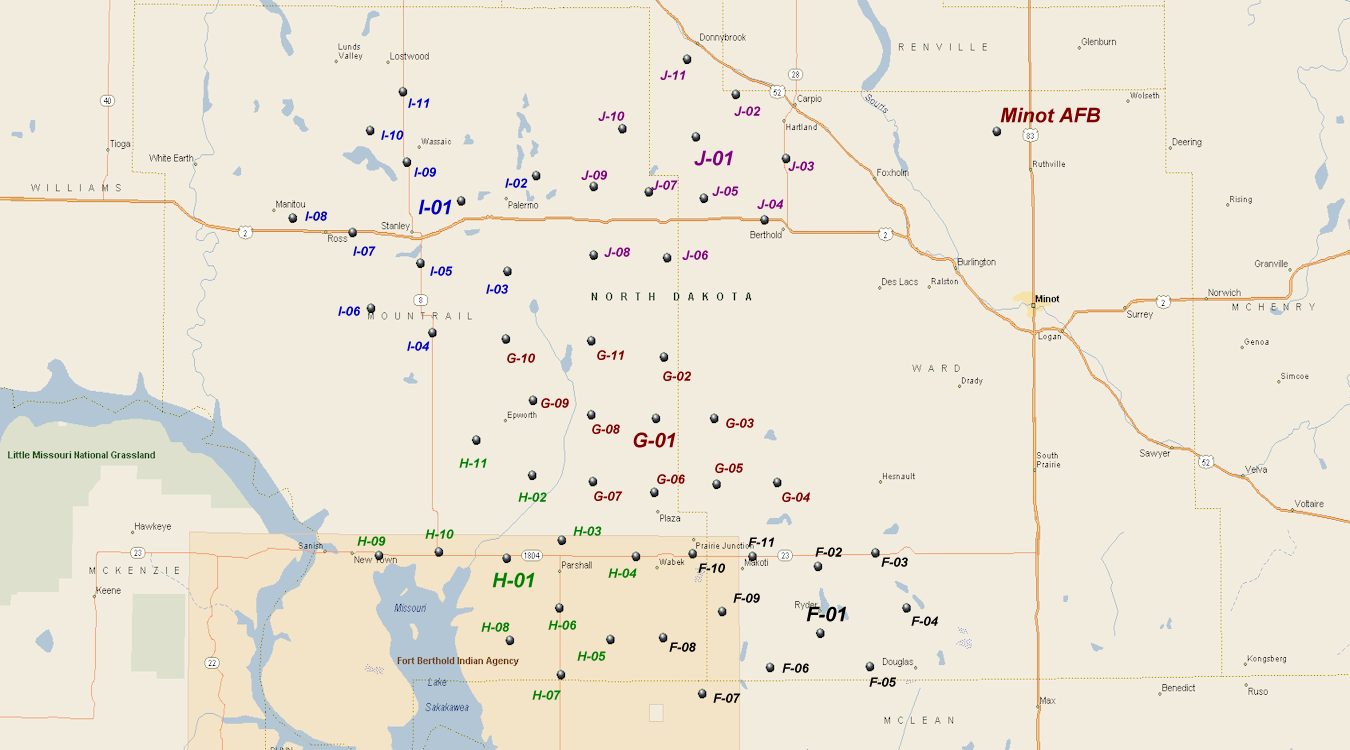
741st Missile Squadron – Missile Alert Facilities and Launch Facilities

- F-01 (MAF) 7.5 mi SE of Makoti, N.D.; 38.2 mi SxSW of Minot AFB
  47°53′46″N 101°40′26″W

F-02 5.8 mi E of Makoti, N.D. 47°57′55″N 101°40′37″W
F-03 10.5 mi E of Makoti, N.D. 47°58′46″N 101°34′35″W
F-04 13.3 mi ExSE of Makoti, N.D. 47°55′18″N 101°31′18″W
F-05 12.2 mi SE of Makoti, N.D. 47°51′40″N 101°35′11″W
F-06 7.2 mi SxSE of Makoti, N.D. 47°51′40″N 101°45′43″W
F-07 9.5 mi SxSW of Makoti, N.D. 47°50′03″N 101°52′48″W
F-08 8.3 mi SW of Makoti, N.D. 47°53′30″N 101°56′54″W
F-09 3.6 mi SW of Makoti, N.D. 47°55′07″N 101°50′41″W
F-10 4.6 mi WxNW of Makoti, N.D. 47°58′46″N 101°53′49″W
F-11 1.1 mi NxNE of Makoti, N.D. 47°58′35″N 101°47′32″W

- G-01 (MAF) 7.1 mi N of Plaza, N.D.; 34.6 mi SW of Minot AFB
  48°07′11″N 101°57′38″W

G-02 11.6 mi N of Plaza, N.D. 48°11′00″N 101°56′51″W
G-03 8.5 mi NxNE of Plaza, N.D. 48°07′09″N 101°51′32″W
G-04 10.3 mi ExNE of Plaza, N.D. 48°03′11″N 101°44′34″W
G-05 5.4 mi ExNE of Plaza, N.D. 48°03′03″N 101°51′17″W
G-06 1.9 mi N of Plaza, N.D. 48°02′35″N 101°57′50″W
G-07 5.9 mi WxNW of Plaza, N.D. 48°03′15″N 102°04′19″W
G-08 9.1 mi NW of Plaza, N.D. 48°07′23″N 102°04′29″W
G-09 13.2 mi NW of Plaza, N.D. 48°08′16″N 102°10′38″W
G-10 17.8 mi NW of Plaza, N.D. 48°12′05″N 102°13′33″W
G-11 13.8 mi NxNW of Plaza, N.D. 48°12′01″N 102°04′29″W

- H-01 (MAF) 4.3 mi WxNW of Parshall, N.D.; 50.3 mi SW of Minot AFB
  47°58′27″N 102°13′20″W

H-02 7.6 mi NxNW of Parshall, N.D. 48°03′37″N 102°10′42″W
H-03 2.7 mi N of Parshall, N.D. 47°59′35″N 102°07′37″W
H-04 6.5 mi ExNE of Parshall, N.D. 47°58′36″N 101°59′48″W
H-05 6.2 mi SE of Parshall, N.D. 47°53′23″N 102°02′26″W
H-06 2.3 mi S of Parshall, N.D. 47°55′20″N 102°07′51″W
H-07 7.0 mi S of Parshall, N.D. 47°51′13″N 102°07′36″W
H-08 6.0 mi SW of Parshall, N.D. 47°53′19″N 102°12′59″W
H-09 14.6 mi W of Parshall, N.D. 47°58′35″N 102°26′48″W
H-10 9.8 mi W of Parshall, N.D. 47°58′49″N 102°20′28″W
H-11 11.8 mi NW of Parshall, N.D. 48°05′47″N 102°16′35″W

- I-01 (MAF) 4.3 mi ExNE of Stanley, N.D.; 44.6 mi W of Minot AFB
  48°20′42″N 102°18′16″W

I-02 10.6 mi ExNE of Stanley, N.D. 48°22′17″N 102°10′24″W
I-03 8.2 mi ExSE of Stanley, N.D. 48°16′20″N 102°13′22″W
I-04 7.7 mi SxSE of Stanley, N.D. 48°12′29″N 102°21′19″W
I-05 2.6 mi SxSE of Stanley, N.D. 48°16′46″N 102°22′37″W
I-06 6.7 mi SxSW of Stanley, N.D. 48°13′58″N 102°27′46″W
I-07 5.1 mi W of Stanley, N.D. 48°18′41″N 102°29′59″W
I-08 9.9 mi W of Stanley, N.D. 48°19′32″N 102°36′08″W
I-09 4.7 mi N of Stanley, N.D. 48°23′04″N 102°24′06″W
I-10 7.8 mi NxNW of Stanley, N.D. 48°25′02″N 102°27′59″W
I-11 9.8 mi N of Stanley, N.D. 48°27′27″N 102°24′35″W

- J-01 (MAF) 9.8 mi NW of Berthold, N.D.; 25.4 mi W of Minot AFB
  48°24′43″N 101°53′29″W

J-02 10.5 mi NxNW of Berthold, N.D. 48°27′20″N 101°49′11″W
J-03 5.2 mi N of Berthold, N.D. 48°23′22″N 101°43′55″W
J-04 1.7 mi WxNW of Berthold, N.D. 48°19′33″N 101°46′10″W
J-05 6.8 mi WxNW of Berthold, N.D. 48°20′52″N 101°52′35″W
J-06 9.7 mi WxSW of Berthold, N.D. 48°17′10″N 101°56′32″W
J-07 11.3 mi WxNW of Berthold, N.D. 48°21′17″N 101°58′26″W
J-08 15.5 mi W of Berthold, N.D. 48°17′21″N 102°04′18″W
J-09 15.7 mi WxNW of Berthold, N.D. 48°21′38″N 102°04′18″W
J-10 14.8 mi WxNW of Berthold, N.D. 48°25′11″N 102°01′06″W
J-11 14.5 mi NxNW of Berthold, N.D. 48°29′31″N 101°54′23″W

=== 742nd Missile Squadron ===
Activated by Strategic Air Command on 18 July 1962. Organized on 1 January 1963

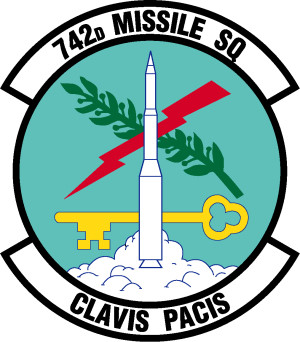
Emblem of the 742d Missile Squadron

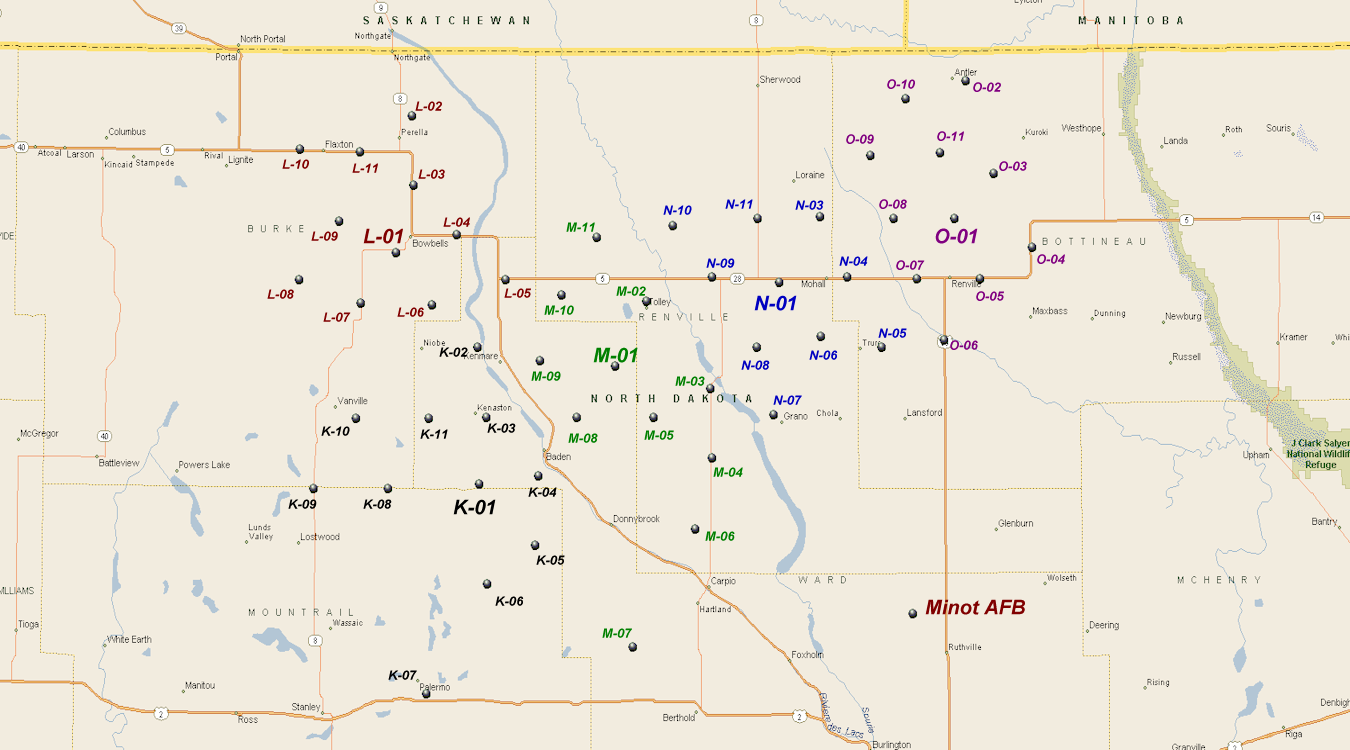
742d Missile Squadron – Missile Alert Facilities and Launch Facilities

- K-01 (MAF) 8.8 mi SxSW of Kenmare, N.D.; 37.3 mi WxNW of Minot AFB
  48°33′02″N 102°07′12″W

K-02 2.3 mi WxNW of Kenmare, N.D. 48°41′32″N 102°07′24″W
K-03 4.0 mi SxSW of Kenmare, N.D. 48°37′11″N 102°06′24″W
K-04 8.6 mi SxSE of Kenmare, N.D. 48°33′31″N 102°00′54″W
K-05 13.3 mi SxSE of Kenmare, N.D. 48°29′14″N 102°01′07″W
K-06 15.8 mi S of Kenmare, N.D. 48°26′51″N 102°06′17″W
K-07 15.6 mi SxSW of Kenmare, N.D. 48°28′00″N 102°12′38″W
K-08 12.8 mi SW of Kenmare, N.D. 48°32′42″N 102°16′45″W
K-09 17.5 mi WxSW of Kenmare, N.D. 48°32′40″N 102°24′37″W
K-10 12.3 mi WxSW of Kenmare, N.D. 48°37′03″N 102°20′12″W
K-11 10.3 mi WxNW of Kenmare, N.D. 48°37′04″N 102°12′32″W

- L-01 (MAF) 1.5 mi SW of Bowbells, N.D.; 50.4 mi WxNW of Minot AFB
  48°47′21″N 102°16′06″W

L-02 8.8 mi N of Bowbells, N.D. 48°55′51″N 102°14′28″W
L-03 3.9 mi N of Bowbells, N.D. 48°51′33″N 102°14′15″W
L-04 3.9 mi E of Bowbells, N.D. 48°48′31″N 102°09′38″W
L-05 8.3 mi ExSE of Bowbells, N.D. 48°45′44″N 102°04′29″W
L-06 5.0 mi SxSE of Bowbells, N.D. 48°44′09″N 102°12′14″W
L-07 6.0 mi SW of Bowbells, N.D. 48°44′13″N 102°19′46″W
L-08 9.3 mi WxSW of Bowbells, N.D. 48°45′38″N 102°26′18″W
L-09 5.8 mi WxNW of Bowbells, N.D. 48°49′15″N 102°22′10″W
L-10 10.9 mi NW of Bowbells, N.D. 48°53′44″N 102°26′22″W
L-11 7.4 mi NxNW of Bowbells, N.D. 48°53′34″N 102°19′57″W

- M-01 (MAF) 5.7 mi SE of Norma, N.D.; 31.3 mi NW of Minot AFB
  48°40′22″N 101°52′53″W

M-02 6.8 mi E of Norma, N.D. 48°44′42″N 101°49′33″W
M-03 13.1 mi ExSE of Norma, N.D. 48°38′58″N 101°42′49″W
M-04 15.9 mi SE of Norma, N.D. 48°34′39″N 101°42′37″W
M-05 10.5 mi SE of Norma, N.D. 48°37′11″N 101°48′45″W
M-06 18.8 mi SE of Norma, N.D. 48°30′15″N 101°44′25″W
M-07 13.7 mi SxSE of Norma, N.D. 48°32′58″N 101°50′39″W
M-08 7.6 mi S of Norma, N.D. 48°37′11″N 101°56′54″W
M-09 4.0 mi SxSW of Norma, N.D. 48°40′40″N 102°00′46″W
M-10 1.2 mi N of Norma, N.D. 48°44′45″N 101°58′33″W
M-11 6.0 mi NxNE of Norma, N.D. 48°48′21″N 101°54′48″W

- N-01 (MAF) 3.7 mi W of Mohall, N.D.; 27.4 mi NxNW of Minot AFB
  48°45′34″N 101°35′31″W

N-02 8.9 mi NxNW of Mohall, N.D. 48°53′19″N 101°33′51″W
N-03 4.3 mi N of Mohall, N.D. 48°49′37″N 101°31′11″W
N-04 1.8 mi E of Mohall, N.D. 48°45′54″N 101°28′16″W
N-05 6.8 mi SE of Mohall, N.D. 48°41′32″N 101°24′38″W
N-06 4.3 mi S of Mohall, N.D. 48°42′11″N 101°31′05″W
N-07 10.7 mi SxSW of Mohall, N.D. 48°37′20″N 101°36′06″W
N-08 7.4 mi SW of Mohall, N.D. 48°41′31″N 101°37′50″W
N-09 9.1 mi W of Mohall, N.D. 48°45′54″N 101°42′36″W
N-10 12.8 mi WxNW of Mohall, N.D. 48°49′06″N 101°46′46″W
N-11 6.8 mi NW of Mohall, N.D. 48°49′32″N 101°37′47″W

- O-01 (MAF) 9.5 mi NW of Maxbass, ND 29.5 mi N of Minot AFB
  48°49′28″N 101°16′55″W

O-02 17.8 mi NxNW of Maxbass, N.D. 48°58′01″N 101°15′36″W
O-03 10.8 mi NxNW of Maxbass, N.D. 48°52′13″N 101°12′40″W
O-04 5.0 mi N of Maxbass, N.D. 48°47′39″N 101°08′40″W
O-05 5.1 mi WxNW of Maxbass, N.D. 48°45′42″N 101°14′14″W
O-06 7.4 mi WxSW of Maxbass, N.D. 48°41′56″N 101°18′05″W
O-07 9.8 mi WxNW of Maxbass, N.D. 48°45′43″N 101°20′54″W
O-08 13.3 mi WxNW of Maxbass, N.D. 48°49′28″N 101°23′19″W
O-09 17.5 mi NW of Maxbass, N.D. 48°53′26″N 101°25′47″W
O-10 18.7 mi NxNW of Maxbass, N.D. 48°56′54″N 101°22′01″W
O-11 14.0 mi NxNW of Maxbass, N.D. 48°53′33″N 101°18′25″W
