= Ohio-class submarine =

Class of US nuclear ballistic missile submarines

- Ohio-class SSBN profile

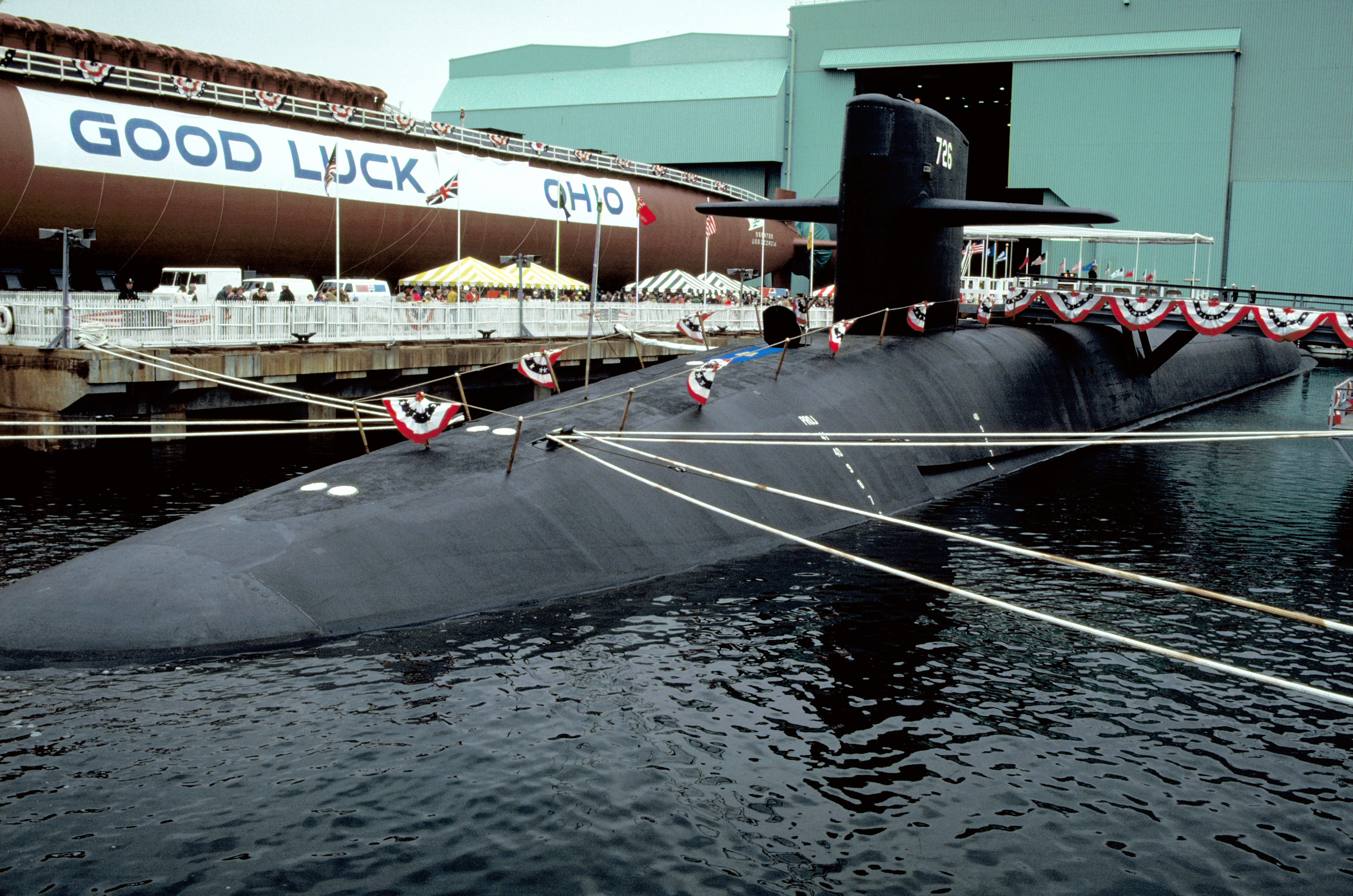
- USS Ohio, during her commissioning ceremony in 1981.

Class overview
- Name: Ohio class
- Builders: General Dynamics Electric Boat
- Operators: United States Navy
- Preceded by: Benjamin Franklin class
- Succeeded by: Columbia class (ballistic missile submarine variant); Virginia class (cruise missile submarine variant)
- Cost: $2 billion (late 1990s) ($3.72 billion in 2025 dollars)
- Built: 1976–1997
- In commission: 1981–present
- Planned: 24
- Completed: 18
- Canceled: 6
- Active: 18

General characteristics
- Type: SSBN/SSGN (hull design SCB-304)
- Displacement: 16,764 tonnes (16,499 long tons) surfaced; 18,750 tonnes (18,450 long tons) submerged
- Length: 560 ft (170 m)
- Beam: 42 ft (13 m)
- Draft: 35.5 ft (10.8 m) maximum
- Propulsion: 1× S8G PWR nuclear reactor; 2× geared turbines; 35,000 shp (26 MW); 1x Fairbanks Morse auxiliary diesel; 1× 325 hp (242 kW) auxiliary motor; 1 shaft with seven-bladed screw
- Speed: 12 knots (22 km/h; 14 mph) surfaced; 20 knots (37 km/h; 23 mph) submerged (official); 25 knots (46 km/h; 29 mph) submerged (reported)
- Range: Limited only by food supplies
- Test depth: +800 ft (240 m)
- Complement: 15 officers, 140 enlisted
- Sensors & processing systems: BQQ-6 passive bow-mounted array (which includes BQS-13 fire control array); BQR-19 navigation; TB-16 or BQR-23 towed array; BQR-25 conformal array; AN/BPS-15J
- Armament: 4 × 21 inch (533 mm) Mark 48 torpedo tubes (Forward Compartment 4th level)

General characteristics (SSBN-726 to SSBN-733 from construction to refueling)
- Armament: 20 (Note: Each hull initially started out with 24 missile tubes. This number was reduced to 20 in 2017 to comply with the New START treaty) × Trident I C4 SLBM with up to 8 MIRVed 100 kt_{TNT} W76 nuclear warheads each, range 4,000 nmi (7,400 km; 4,600 mi)

General characteristics (SSBN-734 and subsequent hulls upon construction, SSBN-730 to SSBN-733 since refueling)
- Armament: 20 × Trident II D5 SLBM with up to 12 MIRVed W76 (100 kt_{TNT}) or up to 8 MIRVed W88 (475 kt_{TNT}) nuclear warheads each, range 4,000 nmi (7,400 km; 4,600 mi)

General characteristics (SSGN conversion)
- Armament: 22 tubes, each with 7 Tomahawk cruise missiles, totaling 154

The Ohio class of nuclear-powered submarines includes the United States Navy's 14 ballistic missile submarines (SSBNs) and its 4 cruise missile submarines (SSGNs). Each displacing 18,750 tons submerged, the Ohio-class boats are the largest submarines ever built for the U.S. Navy, the largest cruise missile submarines ever built, and are capable of carrying 24 Trident II ballistic missiles or 22 tubes with 7 BGM-109 Tomahawk cruise missiles apiece. They are also the third-largest submarines ever built, behind the Russian Navy's Soviet era 48,000-ton Typhoon class, the last of which was retired in 2023, (Note: The last boat of the Typhoon class, Dmitry Donskoy, was confirmed by Russia, in February 2023, as deactivated.) and 24,000-ton Borei class.

Like their predecessors the Benjamin Franklin and Lafayette classes, the Ohio-class SSBNs are part of the United States' nuclear-deterrent triad, along with U.S. Air Force strategic bombers and intercontinental ballistic missiles. The 14 SSBNs together carry about half of U.S. active strategic thermonuclear warheads. Although the Trident missiles have no preset targets when the submarines go on patrol, they can be given targets quickly, from the United States Strategic Command based in Nebraska, using secure and constant radio communications links, including very low frequency systems.

All the Ohio-class submarines, except for USS Henry M. Jackson, are named for U.S. states, which U.S. Navy tradition had previously reserved for battleships and later cruisers. The Ohio class is to be gradually replaced by the Columbia class beginning in 2031.

== Description ==
The Ohio-class submarine was designed for extended strategic deterrent patrols. Each submarine is assigned two complete crews, called the Blue crew and the Gold crew, each typically serving 70-to-90-day deterrent patrols. To decrease the time in port for crew turnover and replenishment, three large logistics hatches have been installed to provide large-diameter resupply and repair access. These hatches allow rapid transfer of supply pallets, equipment replacement modules, and machinery components, speeding up replenishment and maintenance of the submarines. Moreover, the "stealth" ability of the submarines was significantly improved over all previous ballistic-missile subs. Ohio was virtually undetectable in her sea trials in 1982, giving the U.S. Navy extremely advanced flexibility.

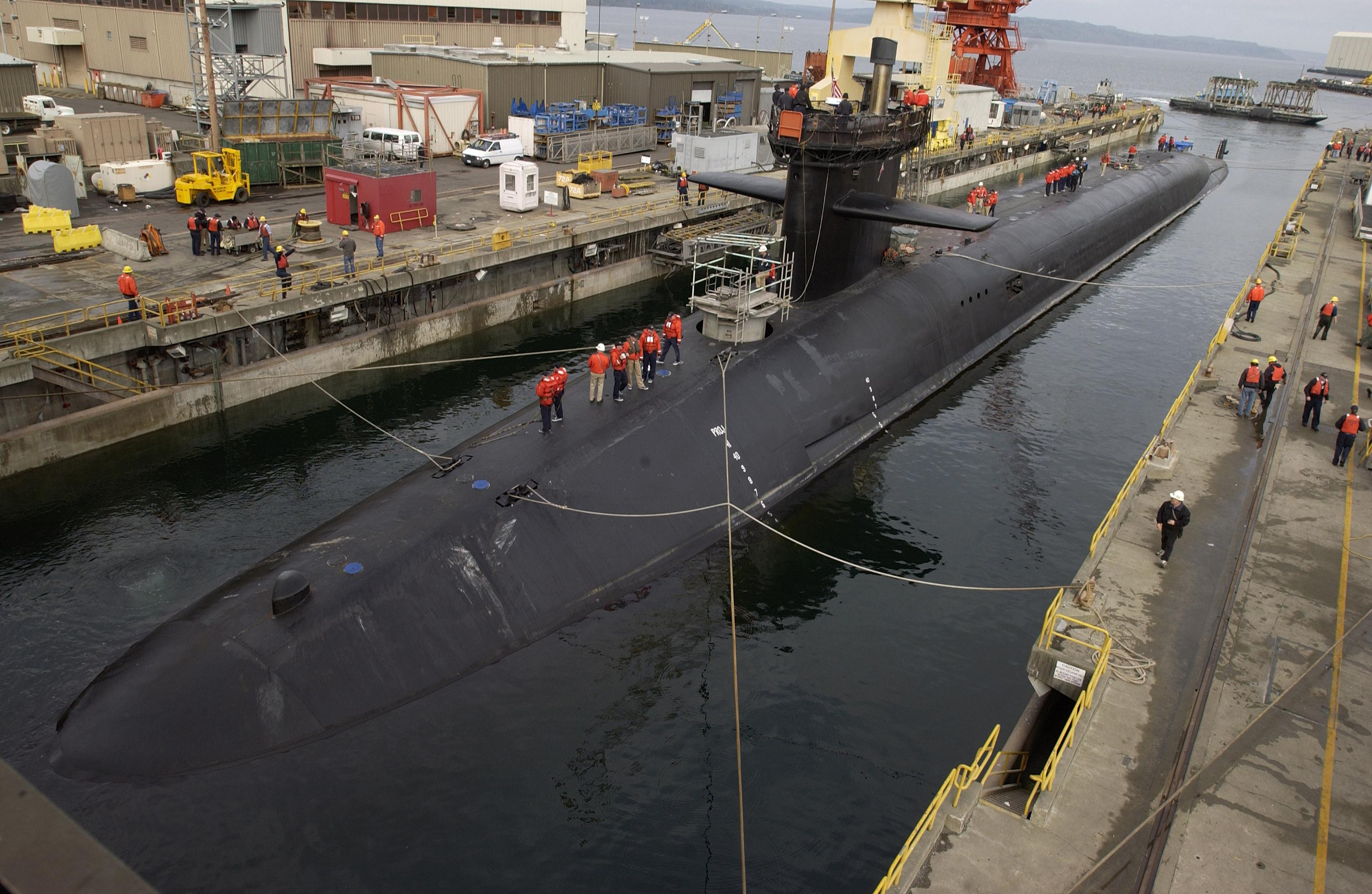
USS Michigan (SSBN-727) at a dry-dock in November 2002, before its conversion to an SSGN

The class's design allows the boat to operate for about 15 years between major overhauls. These submarines are reported to be as quiet at their cruising speed of 20 knots (37 km/h; 23 mph) or more as the previous Lafayette-class submarines at 6 knots (11 km/h; 6.9 mph), although exact information remains classified. Fire control for their Mark 48 torpedoes is carried out by Mark 118 Mod 2 system, while the Missile Fire Control system is a Mark 98.

The Ohio-class submarines were constructed from sections of hull, with each four-deck section being 42 ft (13 m) in diameter. The sections were produced at the General Dynamics Electric Boat facility, Quonset Point, Rhode Island, and then assembled at its shipyard at Groton, Connecticut.

The US Navy has a total of 18 Ohio-class submarines which consist of 14 ballistic missile submarines (SSBNs), and four cruise missile submarines (SSGNs). The SSBN submarines provide the sea-based leg of the U.S. nuclear triad. Each SSBN submarine is armed with up to 20 Trident II submarine-launched ballistic missiles (SLBM). Each SSGN is capable of carrying 154 Tomahawk cruise missiles, plus a complement of Harpoon missiles to be fired through their torpedo tubes.

== History ==
The Ohio class was designed in the 1970s to carry the concurrently designed Trident submarine-launched ballistic missile. The first eight Ohio-class submarines were armed at first with 24 Trident I C4 SLBMs. Beginning with the ninth Trident submarine, Tennessee, the remaining boats were equipped with the larger, three-stage Trident II D5 missile. The Trident I missile carries eight multiple independently targetable reentry vehicles, while the Trident II missile carries 12, in total delivering more destructive power than the Trident I missile and with greater accuracy. Starting with Alaska in 2000, the Navy began converting its remaining ballistic missile submarines armed with C4 missiles to carry D5 missiles. This task was completed in mid-2008. The first eight submarines had their home ports at Bangor, Washington, to replace the submarines carrying Polaris A3 missiles that were then being decommissioned. The remaining 10 submarines originally had their home ports at Kings Bay, Georgia, replacing the Poseidon and Trident Backfit submarines of the Atlantic Fleet.

=== SSBN/SSGN conversions ===
Ohio-class SSGN profile

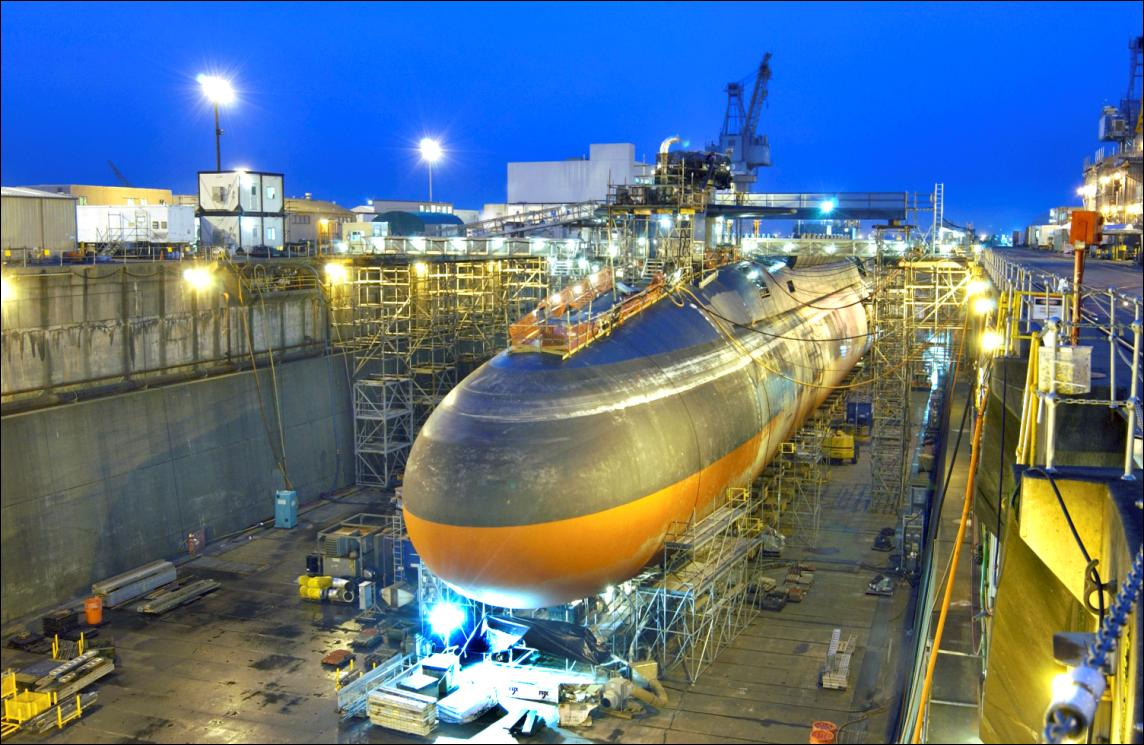
USS Ohio being converted from an SSBN to an SSGN in March 2004

In 1994, the Nuclear Posture Review study determined that, of the 18 Ohio SSBNs the U.S. Navy would be operating in total, 14 would be sufficient for the strategic needs of the U.S. The decision was made to convert four Ohio-class boats into SSGNs capable of conducting conventional land attack and special operations. As a result, the four oldest boats of the class—Ohio, Michigan, Florida, and Georgia—progressively entered the conversion process in late 2002 and were returned to active service by 2008. The boats could thereafter carry 154 Tomahawk cruise missiles and 66 special operations personnel, among other capabilities and upgrades. The cost to refit the four boats was around $1 billion (equivalent to $1.5 billion in 2025) per vessel. During the conversion of these four submarines to SSGNs (see below), five of the remaining submarines, Pennsylvania, Kentucky, Nebraska, Maine, and Louisiana, were transferred from Kings Bay to Bangor.

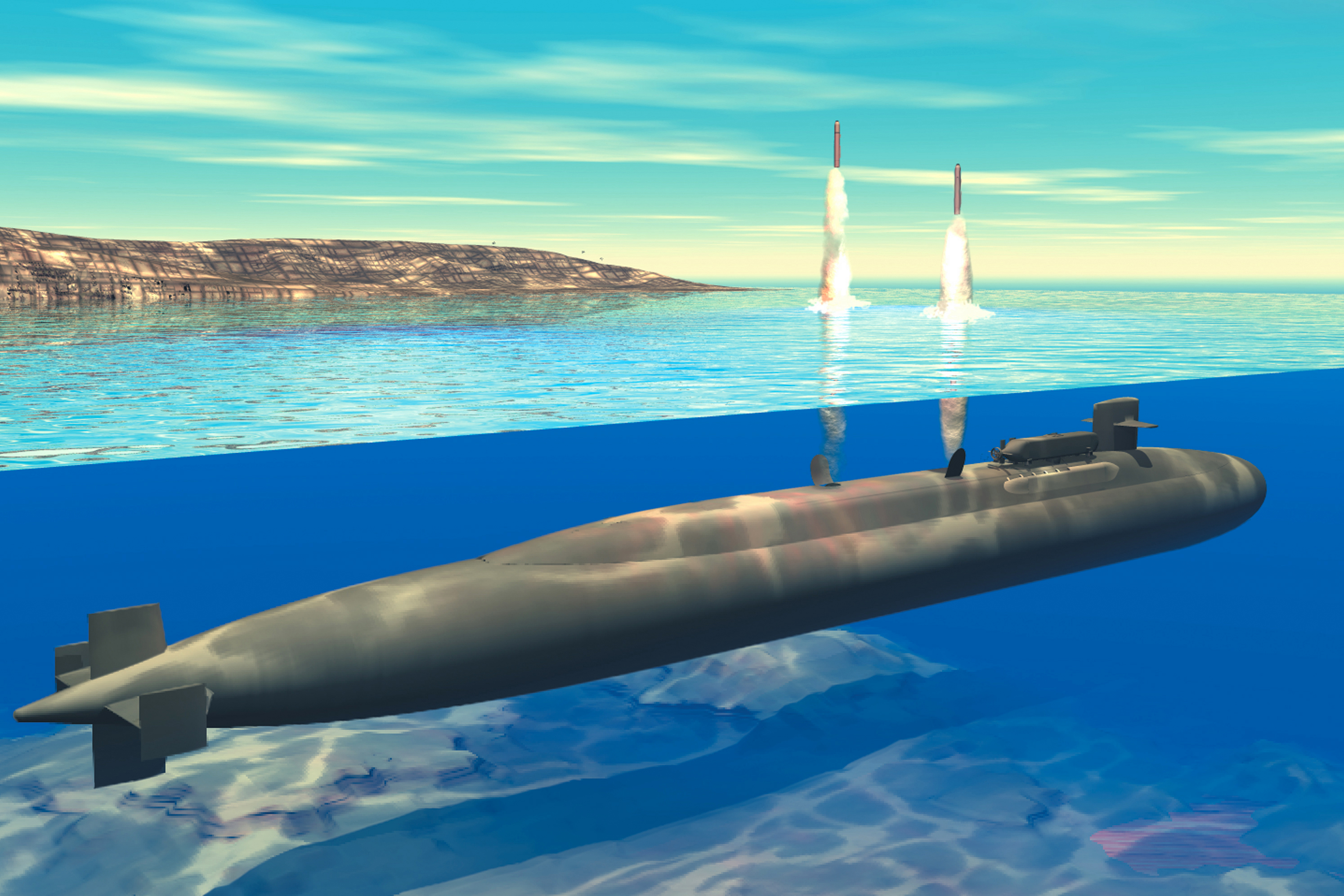
Artist's concept of an Ohio-class SSGN launching Tomahawk Land Attack Missiles

The conversion modified 22 of the 24 88-inch (2.2 m) diameter Trident missile tubes to contain large vertical launch systems, one configuration of which may be a cluster of seven Tomahawk cruise missiles. In this configuration, the number of cruise missiles carried could be a maximum of 154, the equivalent of what is typically deployed in a surface battle group. Other payload possibilities include new generations of supersonic and hypersonic cruise missiles, and Submarine Launched Intermediate Range Ballistic Missiles, unmanned aerial vehicles, the ADM-160 MALD, sensors for antisubmarine warfare or intelligence, surveillance, and reconnaissance missions, counter mine warfare payloads such as the AN/BLQ-11 Long-Term Mine Reconnaissance System, and the broaching universal buoyant launcher and stealthy affordable capsule system specialized payload canisters.

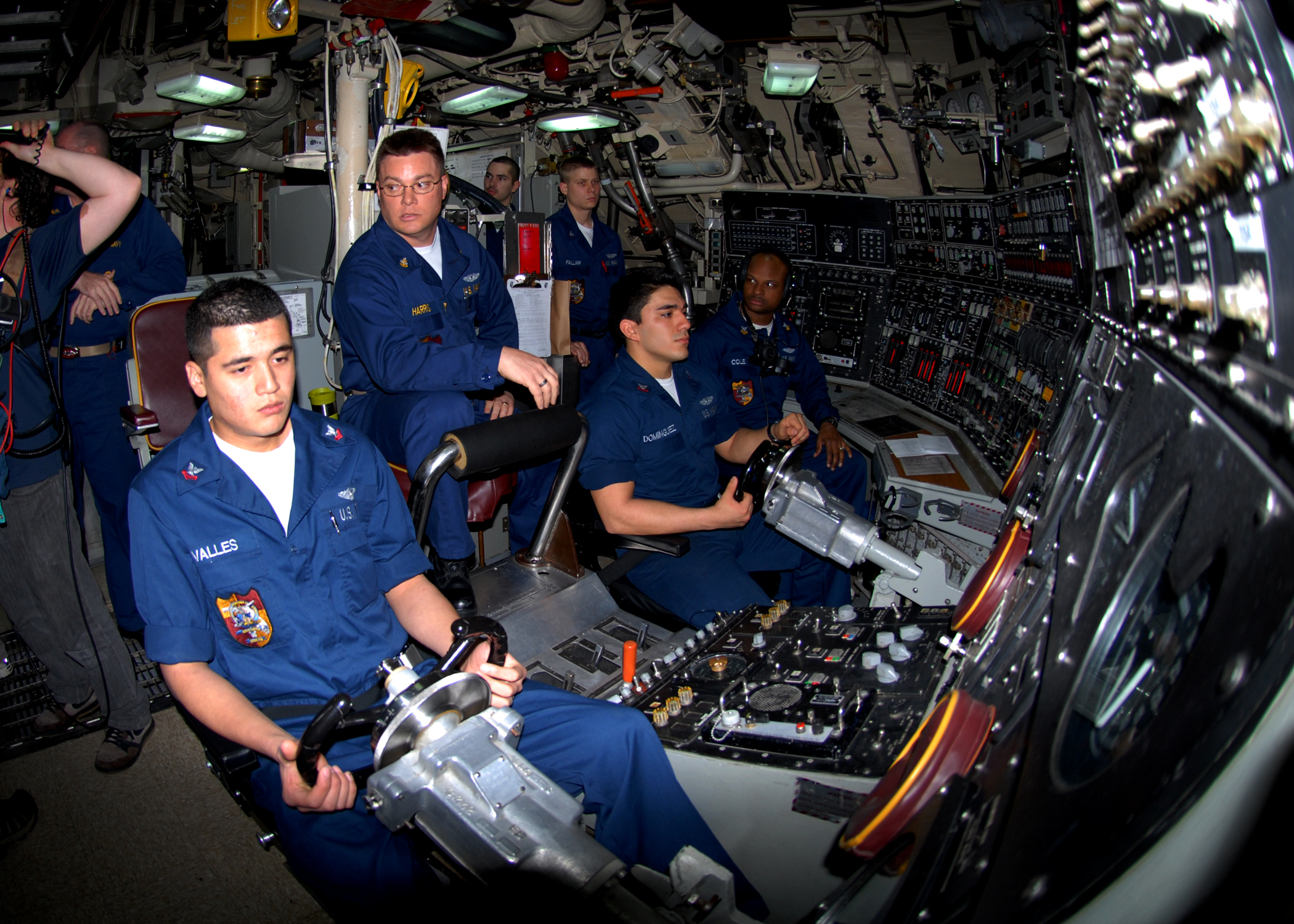
The helm of the Ohio-class guided-missile submarine, USS Florida (SSGN-728), in March 2010

The missile tubes also have room for stowage canisters that can extend the forward deployment time for special forces. The other two Trident tubes are converted to swimmer lockout chambers. For special operations, the Dry Combat Submersible (which replaced the Advanced SEAL Delivery System), as well as the dry deck shelter, can be mounted on the lockout chamber and the boat will be able to host up to 66 special-operations sailors or Marines, such as Navy SEALs, or USMC MARSOC teams. Improved communications equipment installed during the upgrade allows the SSGNs to serve as a forward-deployed, clandestine Small Combatant Joint Command Center.

On 26 September 2002, the Navy awarded General Dynamics Electric Boat a US$442.9 million contract to begin the first phase of the SSGN submarine conversion program. Those funds covered only the initial phase of conversion for the first two boats on the schedule. Advance procurement was funded at $355 million in fiscal year 2002, $825 million in the FY 2003 budget and, through the five-year defense budget plan, at $936 million in FY 2004, $505 million in FY 2005, and $170 million in FY 2006. Thus, the total cost to refit the four boats is just under $700 million per vessel.

In November 2002, Ohio entered a dry-dock, beginning her 36-month refueling and missile-conversion overhaul. Electric Boat announced on 9 January 2006 that the conversion had been completed. The converted Ohio rejoined the fleet in February 2006, followed by Florida in April 2006. The converted Michigan was delivered in November 2006. The converted Ohio went to sea for the first time in October 2007. Georgia returned to the fleet in March 2008 at Kings Bay. These four SSGNs are expected to remain in service until about 2023–2026. At that point, their capabilities will be replaced with Virginia Payload Module-equipped Virginia-class submarine.

In 2011, Ohio-class submarines carried out 28 deterrent patrols. Each patrol lasts around 70 days. Four boats are on station ("hard alert") in designated patrol areas at any given time. From January to June 2014, Pennsylvania carried out a 140-day-long patrol, the longest to date.

=== Missile tube reduction ===
As part of the New START treaty, four tubes on each SSBN were deactivated in 2017, reducing the number of missiles to 20 per boat.

=== Detailed cross-section ===
Line drawing of the Ohio class in its original SSBN configuration. (1) Sonar dome, (2) Main ballast tanks, (3) Computer room, (4) Integrated radio room, (5) Sonar room, (6) Command and control center, (7) Navigation center, (8) Missile control center, (9) Engine room, (10) Reactor compartment, (11) Auxiliary machinery room no. 2, (12) Crew's berthing, (13) Auxiliary machinery room no. 1, (14) Torpedo room, (15) Wardroom, (16) Chief petty officer quarters, (17) Missile compartment

== Boats in class ==
List of Ohio-class submarines
Name	Hull number (Note: Hull numbers beginning with 'SSGN' are guided-missile submarines. Those with 'SSBN' are ballistic missile submarines.)	Laid down	Launched	Commissioned	Homeport (Note: Boats based at Naval Base Kitsap, Washington are operated by the U.S. Pacific Fleet, while boats based at Naval Submarine Base Kings Bay, Georgia are operated by U.S. Fleet Forces Command, (formerly the U.S. Atlantic Fleet).)	Service life (status)	Ref.
Ohio	SSGN-726	10 April 1976	7 April 1979	11 November 1981	Naval Base Kitsap, Washington	44 years, 362 days (in active service)	
Michigan	SSGN-727	4 April 1977	26 April 1980	11 September 1982	Naval Base Kitsap, Washington	44 years, 58 days (in active service)	
Florida	SSGN-728	4 July 1976	14 November 1981	18 June 1983	Naval Submarine Base Kings Bay, Georgia	43 years, 143 days (in active service)	
Georgia	SSGN-729	7 April 1979	6 November 1982	11 February 1984	Naval Submarine Base Kings Bay, Georgia	42 years, 170 days total (inactivated July 31, 2026)	
Henry M. Jackson (ex Rhode Island)	SSBN-730	19 November 1981	15 October 1983	6 October 1984	Naval Base Kitsap, Washington	42 years, 33 days (in active service)	
Alabama	SSBN-731	27 August 1981	19 May 1984	25 May 1985	Naval Base Kitsap, Washington	41 years, 167 days (in active service)	
Alaska	SSBN-732	9 March 1983	12 January 1985	25 January 1986	Naval Submarine Base Kings Bay, Georgia	40 years, 287 days (in active service)	
Nevada	SSBN-733	8 August 1983	14 September 1985	16 August 1986	Naval Base Kitsap, Washington	40 years, 84 days (in active service)	
Tennessee	SSBN-734	9 June 1984	13 December 1986	17 December 1988	Naval Submarine Base Kings Bay, Georgia	37 years, 326 days (in active service)	
Pennsylvania	SSBN-735	10 January 1984	23 April 1988	9 September 1989	Naval Base Kitsap, Washington	37 years, 60 days (in active service)	
West Virginia	SSBN-736	18 December 1987	14 October 1989	20 October 1990	Naval Submarine Base Kings Bay, Georgia	36 years, 19 days (in active service)	
Kentucky	SSBN-737	18 December 1987	11 August 1990	13 July 1991	Naval Base Kitsap, Washington	35 years, 118 days (in active service)	
Maryland	SSBN-738	22 April 1986	10 August 1991	13 June 1992	Naval Submarine Base Kings Bay, Georgia	34 years, 148 days (in active service)	
Nebraska	SSBN-739	6 July 1987	15 August 1992	10 July 1993	Naval Base Kitsap, Washington	33 years, 121 days (in active service)	
Rhode Island	SSBN-740	15 September 1988	17 July 1993	9 July 1994	Naval Submarine Base Kings Bay, Georgia	32 years, 122 days (in active service)	
Maine	SSBN-741	3 July 1990	16 July 1994	29 July 1995	Naval Base Kitsap, Washington	31 years, 112 days (in active service)	
Wyoming	SSBN-742	8 August 1991	15 July 1995	13 July 1996	Naval Submarine Base Kings Bay, Georgia	30 years, 118 days (in active service)	
Louisiana	SSBN-743	23 October 1992	27 July 1996	6 September 1997	Naval Base Kitsap, Washington	29 years, 63 days (in active service)	

== Replacement ==
The U.S. Department of Defense anticipated a continued need for a sea-based strategic nuclear force. The first of the current Ohio-class SSBNs was expected to be retired by 2029, so the replacement submarine would need to be seaworthy by that time. A replacement was expected to cost over $4 billion per unit compared to Ohio's $2 billion. The U.S. Navy explored two options. The first option was a variant of the Virginia-class nuclear-powered attack submarines. The second option was a dedicated SSBN, either with a new hull or based on an overhaul of the current Ohio class.

With the cooperation of both Electric Boat and Newport News Shipbuilding, in 2007, the U.S. Navy began a cost-control study. Then in December 2008, the U.S. Navy awarded Electric Boat a contract for the missile compartment design of the Ohio-class replacement, worth up to $592 million. Newport News is expected to receive close to 4% of that project. In April 2009, U.S. Defense Secretary Robert M. Gates stated that the U.S. Navy was expected to begin such a program in 2010. The new vessel was scheduled to enter the design phase by 2014. If a new hull design was to be used, the program needed to be initiated by 2016 to meet the 2029 deadline.

The Columbia class was officially designated on 14 December 2016, by Secretary of the Navy Ray Mabus, and the lead submarine will be USS District of Columbia (SSBN-826). The Navy wants to procure the first Columbia-class boat in FY2021, though it is not expected to enter service until 2031.

In 2020, Navy officials first publicly discussed the idea of extending the lives of select Ohio-class boats at the Naval Submarine League's 2020 conference. During the 2022 conference, Rear Admiral Scott Pappano, the program executive officer for strategic submarines, and Rear Admiral Douglas G. Perry, the director of undersea warfare on the Chief of Naval Operations' staff, discussed the Columbia-class program, and also touched on the possibility of finding Ohio-class boats that had sufficient remaining nuclear fuel and were in good enough material state to be given a further extension to their lives.

== In popular culture ==
As ballistic-missile submarines, the Ohio class has occasionally been portrayed in fiction books and films.

- Tom Clancy wrote Ohio-class submarines into several novels, such as USS Maine (SSBN-741) in The Sum of All Fears (1991).
- The fictional USS Montana is featured in the 1989 film The Abyss.
- USS Alabama is the setting for the 1995 submarine film Crimson Tide.
- The fictional ballistic missile submarine USS Colorado (SSBN-753) is the primary setting for the ABC television series Last Resort.
- USS Wyoming is featured in Season 1, Episode 13 of the American television series The Brave.

== See also ==
- List of submarine classes of the United States Navy
- List of submarines of the United States Navy
- List of submarine classes in service
- Submarines in the United States Navy
- Submarine-launched ballistic missile

== Bibliography ==
- Chant, Chris (2005). Submarine Warfare Today. Leicester, United Kingdom: Silverdale Books. ISBN 1-84509-158-2. OCLC 156749009.
- Chinworth, William C. (15 March 2006). The Future of the Ohio Class Submarine (PDF) (Master of Strategic Studies thesis). Carlisle Barracks, Pennsylvania: U.S. Army War College. OCLC 70852911. Archived from the original (PDF) on 13 August 2011.
- Genat, Robert; Genat, Robin (1997). Modern U.S. Navy Submarines. Osceola, Wisconsin: Motorbooks International. ISBN 0-7603-0276-6. OCLC 36713050.
