= USS Nevada (SSBN-733) =

Ballistic missile submarine

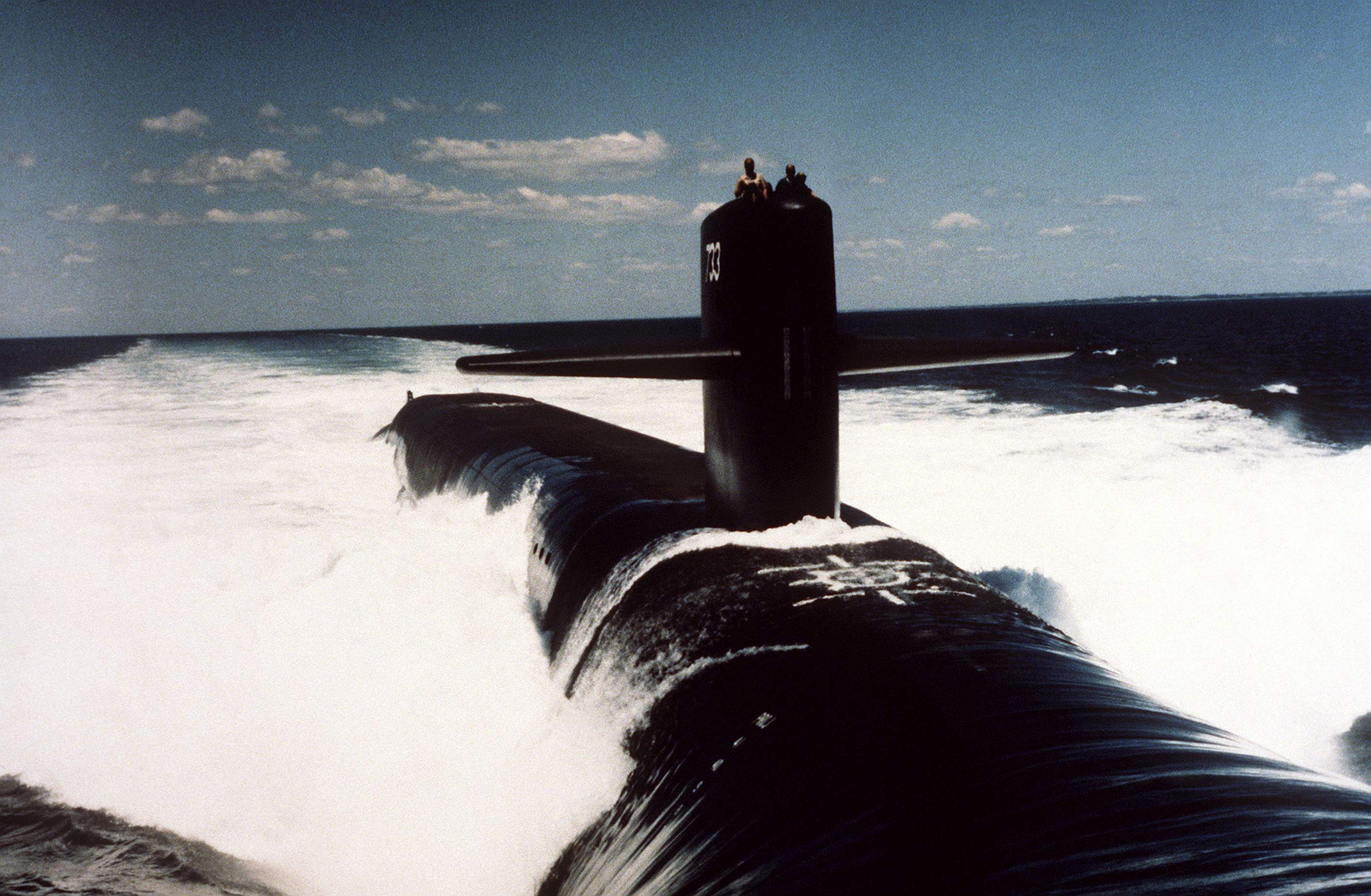
- USS Nevada (SSBN-733)

History

United States
- Name: USS Nevada
- Namesake: The U.S. state of Nevada
- Ordered: 7 January 1981
- Builder: General Dynamics Electric Boat, Groton, Connecticut
- Laid down: 8 August 1983
- Launched: 14 September 1985
- Sponsored by: Mrs. Carol Laxalt
- Commissioned: 16 August 1986
- Home port: Naval Base Kitsap
- Motto: Silent Sentry
- Honors and awards: Both Crews: Battle Efficiency Award (Battle "E") 2005; Blue Crew: Battle "E" 2006; Gold Crew Engineering "E", Supply "S", Tactical "T", Medical "M", Deck "D", 2006 and 2007; Both Crews: Omaha Trophy 2018
- Status: in active service
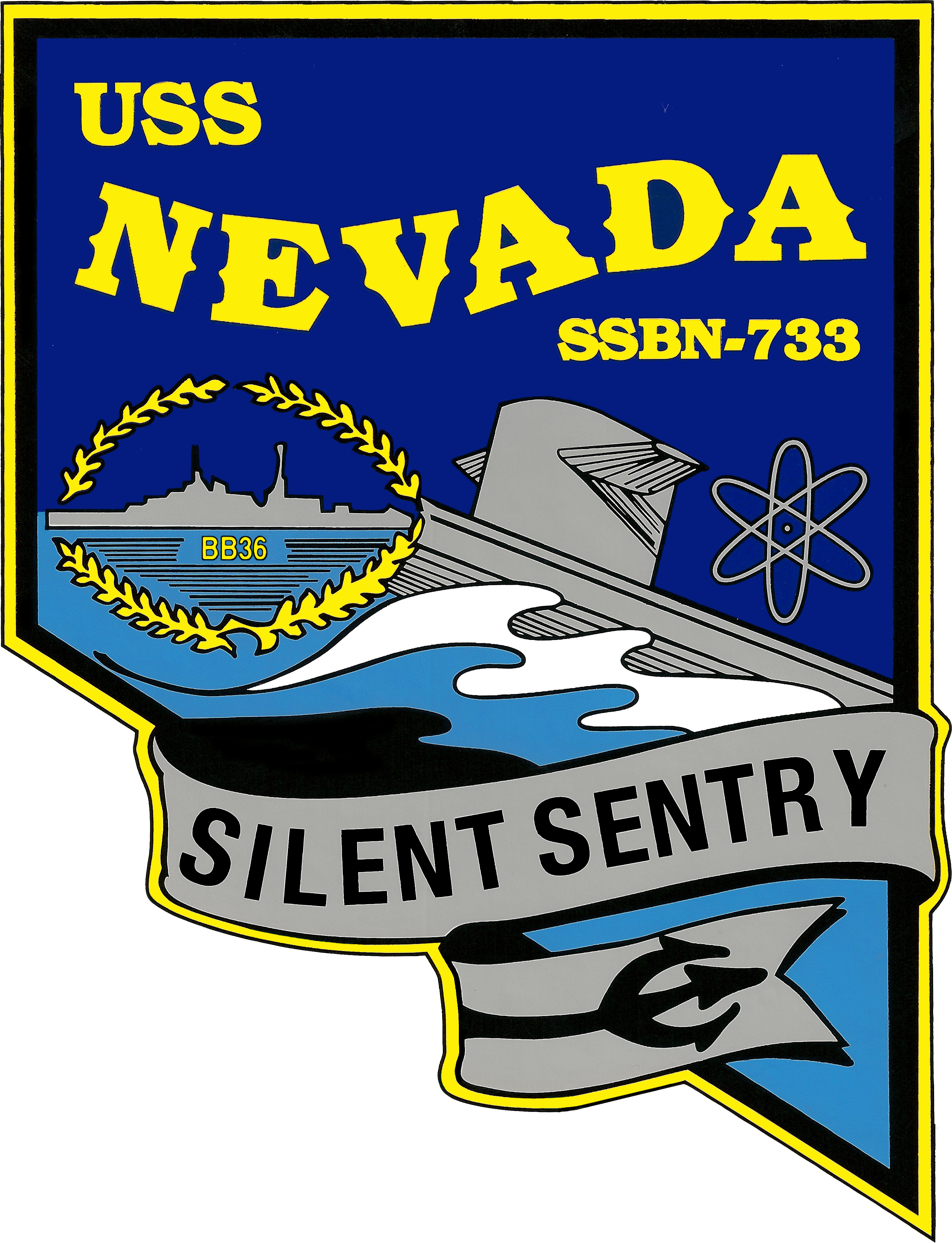
- Badge

General characteristics
- Class & type: Ohio-class ballistic missile submarine
- Displacement: 16,764 long tons (17,033 t) surfaced; 18,750 long tons (19,050 t) submerged
- Length: 560 ft (170 m)
- Beam: 42 ft (13 m)
- Draft: 38 ft (12 m)
- Propulsion: 1 × S8G PWR nuclear reactor (HEU 93.5%); 2 × geared turbines; 1 × 325 hp (242 kW) auxiliary motor; 1 × shaft @ 60,000 shp (45,000 kW)
- Speed: Greater than 25 knots (46 km/h; 29 mph)
- Test depth: Greater than 800 feet (240 m)
- Complement: 15 officers; 140 enlisted
- Armament: MK-48 torpedoes; 20 × Trident II D-5 ballistic missiles

USS Nevada (hull number SSBN-733) is a United States Navy Ohio-class ballistic missile submarine that has been in commission since 1986. She is the fourth ship of the U.S. Navy to be named for Nevada, the 36th state.

== Construction and commissioning ==
The contract to build Nevada was awarded to the Electric Boat Division of General Dynamics Corporation in Groton, Connecticut, on 7 January 1981 and her keel was laid down there on 8 August 1983. She was launched on 14 September 1985 sponsored by Mrs. Carol Laxalt, the wife of United States Senator Paul Laxalt of Nevada, and commissioned on 16 August 1986, with Captain F.W. Rohm in command of the Blue Crew and Captain William Stone in command of the Gold Crew.

During the ceremony, about 100 anti-nuclear activists from the Coalition to Stop Trident demonstrated outside Nevada's commissioning; police arrested 12 of them on charges of disorderly conduct and breach of the peace.

== Service history ==
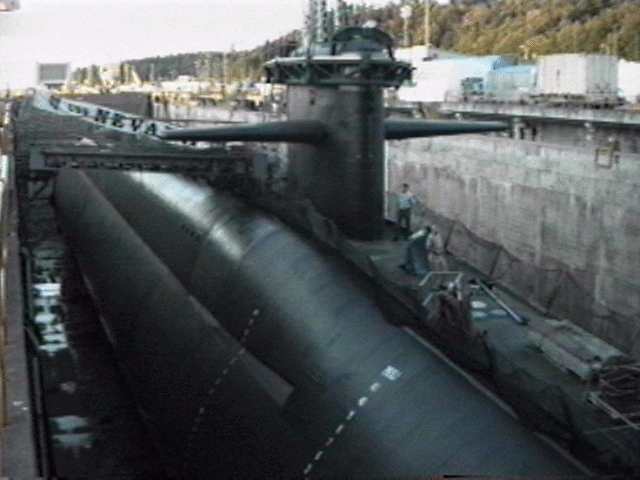
Nevada in drydock

On July 3, 1987, Nevada experienced an equipment failure during the transit to her newly assigned homeport in Bangor, Washington. Portions of the vessel's reduction gear were improperly installed, causing around $500,000 in damages and lost propulsion. While at sea, its crew made temporary repairs and returned to port on its own power.

Nevada moored into Sitka, Alaska alongside USS Dixon on June 7, 1988. On November 4th, it moored at Naval Air Station Alameda and gave tours to the public.

In 1989 Nevada was homeported at Kitsap Naval Base in Bangor, Washington. In August of 1990, Nevada visited the Long Beach Naval Shipyard in California. On April 29, 1993, Nevada successfully launched two Trident 1 (C4) missiles during a "Follow-on CINC Evaluation Test" (FCET) launch. This was performed again with 4 Tridents on 10 February 1998, one of the final C4 missile firings by a Pacific-based submarine before the fleet transitioned to the D5 missile.

On 1 February 2001 Nevada entered the Puget Sound Naval Shipyard in Bremerton, Washington to undergo a significant refit to carry the new Trident II (D5) missiles, which required a backfit engineering process. This refit was completed 8 August 2002, extending its strategic capabilities. Following this conversion, on 11 December 2002, Nevada successfully launched a Trident II (D5) missile during a Demonstration and Shakedown Operation (DASO), this also marked the 100th successful launch of the D5 program.

=== 2003-2006 ===
Following this last test, Nevada returned to operational status. The tests however continued, on 4 November 2004, when the submarine launched two Trident II (D5) missiles during a Commander Evaluation Test.

During the night of 1–2 August 2006, Nevada was operating in the Strait of Juan de Fuca when she snagged and broke the 500-foot (150-metre) towline between the tug Phyllis Dunlap and one of two barges carrying empty containers that Phyllis Dunlap was towing from Honolulu, Hawaii, to Seattle, Washington. Fiberglass portions of Nevada's sail were damaged, and a second tug had to recover the drifting barge.

In both 2005 and 2006 and again in 2018, Nevada's crew was awarded with the Battle Efficiency Award (Battle "E"). This award is given to the best submarine in its respective submarine squadron and is determined based on performance in inspections for tactical readiness and nuclear reactor safety, among other factors.

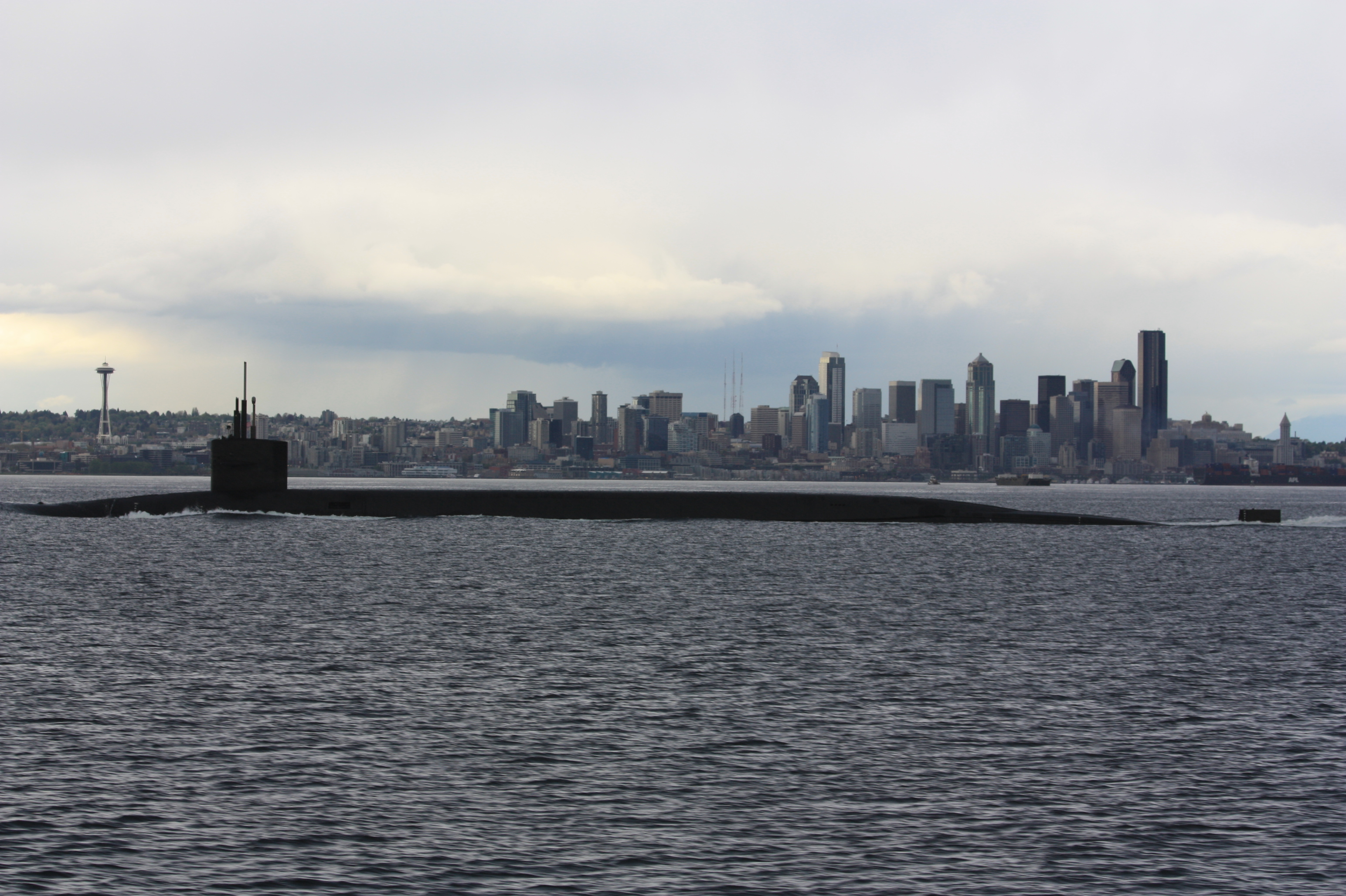
Nevada with Seattle in Background

In February 2008, Nevada entered Puget Sound Naval Shipyard and Intermediate Maintenance Facility, Bremerton Site for a regularly scheduled Engineering Refueling Overhaul. The 'Green' crew worked for nearly 30 months on the refit and refuel until they were separated back to the 'Gold' and 'Blue' crews on 21 July 2010 in preparation for workups and sea trials.

Nevada was awarded the 2018 Omaha Trophy on 21 August 2019. The Blue and Gold crews received the trophy to recognize their high standards of performance in the command's mission areas. The ballistic missile submarine has been regarded as "one of the US Navy's most powerful weapons" in 2022.
