= USS Kentucky (SSBN-737) =

Submarine of the United States

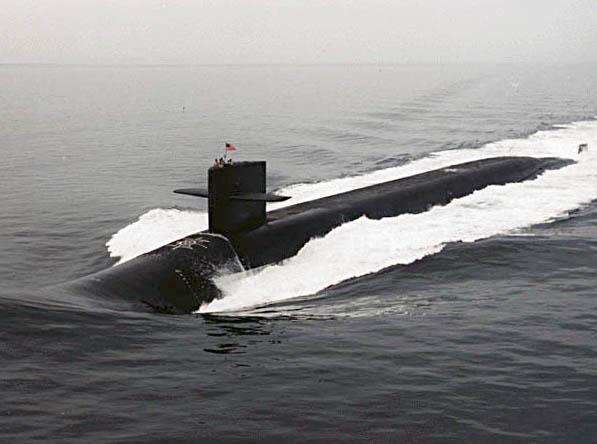
- USS Kentucky (SSBN-737)

History

United States
- Namesake: U.S. state of Kentucky
- Ordered: 13 August 1985
- Builder: General Dynamics Electric Boat, Groton, Connecticut
- Laid down: 18 December 1987
- Launched: 11 August 1990
- Sponsored by: Carolyn Pennebaker Hopkins
- Commissioned: 13 July 1991
- Home port: Bangor, Washington
- Motto: Thoroughbred of the Fleet
- Honors and awards: Gold Crew: Captain Edward F. Ney Memorial Award First Place 2001; Gold Crew: Captain Edward F. Ney Memorial Award First Place 2002; Battle Efficiency Award (Battle "E") 2006, 2009; Gold Crew: Captain Edward F. Ney Memorial Award Honorable Mention 2007
- Status: in active service
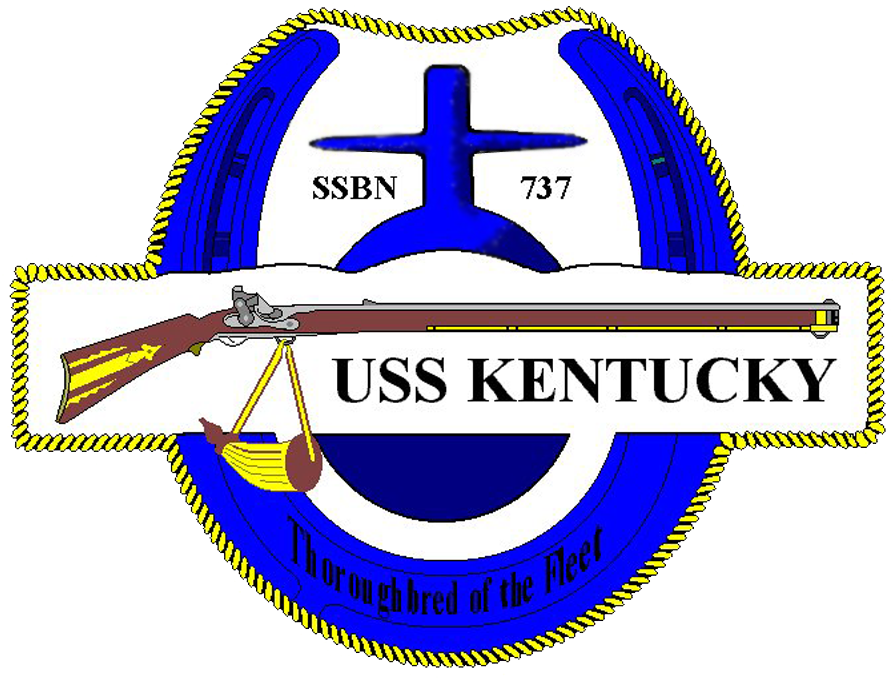
- Badge

General characteristics
- Class & type: Ohio-class ballistic missile submarine
- Displacement: 16,764 long tons (17,033 t) surfaced; 18,750 long tons (19,050 t) submerged
- Length: 560 ft (170 m)
- Beam: 42 ft (13 m)
- Draft: 38 ft (12 m)
- Propulsion: 1 × S8G PWR nuclear reactor (HEU 93.5%); 2 × geared turbines; 1 × 325 hp (242 kW) auxiliary motor; 1 × shaft @ 60,000 shp (45,000 kW)
- Speed: Greater than 25 knots (46 km/h; 29 mph)
- Test depth: Greater than 800 feet (240 m)
- Complement: 15 officers; 140 enlisted
- Armament: MK-48 torpedoes; 20 × Trident II D-5 ballistic missiles

USS Kentucky (hull number SSBN-737) is a United States Navy Ohio-class ballistic missile submarine which has been in commission since 1991. She is the third U.S. Navy ship to be named for Kentucky, the 15th state.

== Construction and commissioning ==
The contract to build Kentucky was awarded to the Electric Boat Division of General Dynamics Corporation in Groton, Connecticut, on 13 August 1985 and her keel was laid down there on 18 December 1987. She was launched on 11 August 1990, sponsored by Carolyn Pennebaker Hopkins, who used a custom blend of Kentucky bourbon whiskey, mixed for the occasion, rather than the traditional bottle of champagne to christen Kentucky. She was commissioned on 13 July 1991, with Captain Michael G. Riegel commanding the Blue Crew and Captain Joseph Henry commanding the Gold Crew.

== Service history ==
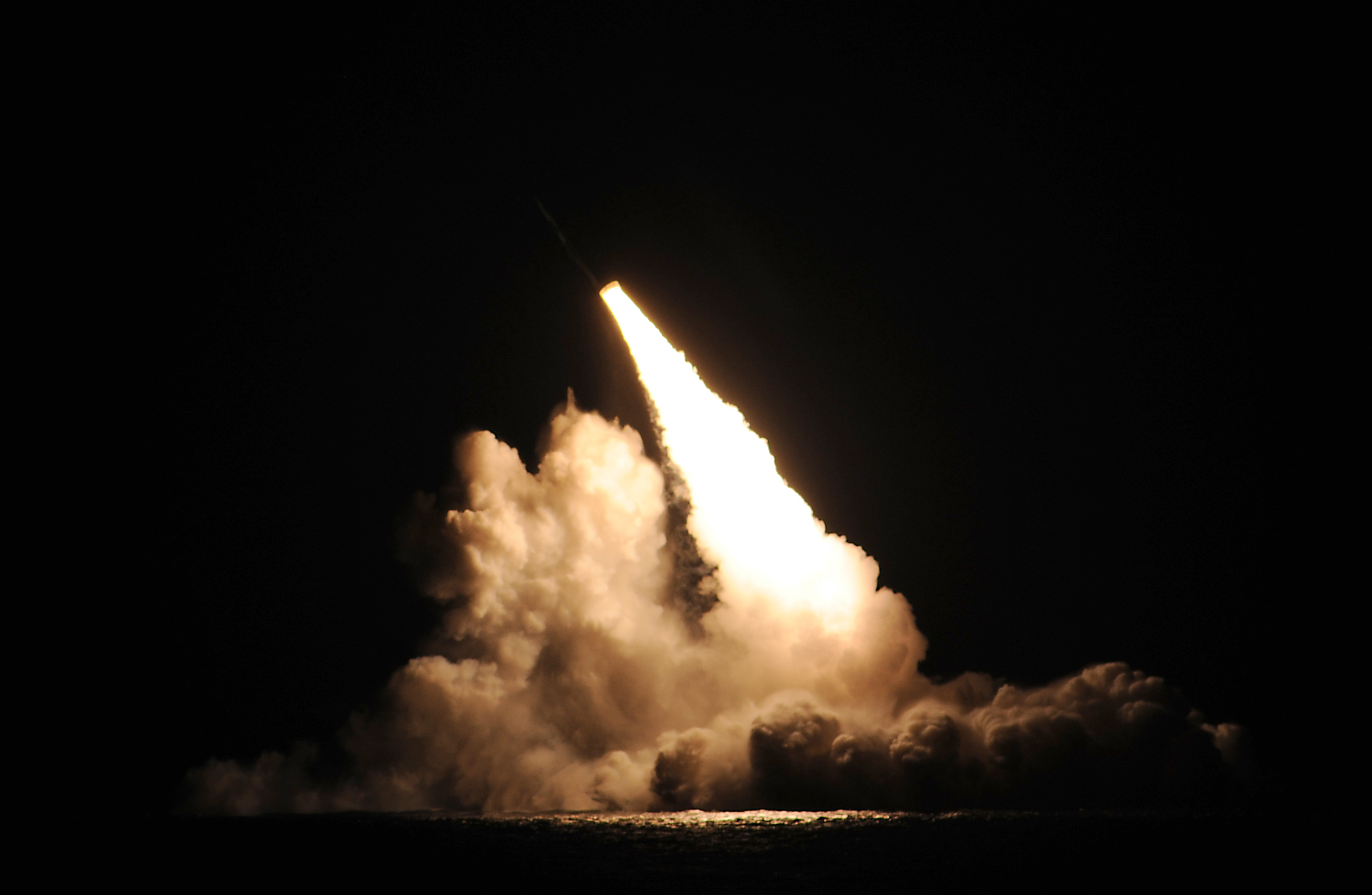
Kentucky firing an SLBM in 2015 as part of a test.

On 19 March 1998 south of Long Island, New York, Kentucky collided with the attack submarine USS San Juan (SSN-751). No personnel suffered any injuries. The two submarines were conducting a joint training drill prior to deployment. One of Kentucky's stern planes was slightly damaged; San Juan's forward ballast tank was breached, but San Juan was able to surface and return to port. Kentucky returned to patrol the next day.

In both 2001 and 2002, Kentucky's Gold Crew won first place in the United States Atlantic Fleet in the Captain Edward F. Ney Memorial Award Submarine Afloat Galley competition for outstanding food service.

Kentucky's Blue and Gold Crews were awarded the Omaha Trophy for service as the best ballistic missile submarine in 2009.

On 12 October 2011, Kentucky had only her periscope above water, when she turned onto a new course that was blocked by the Totem Ocean ship Midnight Sun. The submarine came into close contact of about 800 meters with the freighter near British Columbia in the Strait of Juan de Fuca.

In January 2012 USS Kentucky entered her Engineering Refueling Overhaul (ERO) at Puget Sound Naval Shipyard.

On 7 November 2015, an unarmed missile launched from Kentucky during a test caused buzz on social media as it was mistaken for a UFO or meteor. The launch was also widely reported by the Southern California broadcast media.

On 13 March 2016, following completion of her ERO, Kentucky deployed for the boat's first strategic deterrent mission since 2011.

On July 18 2023, Kentucky made a port visit to the Busan Naval Base in South Korea, the first such visit in over forty years. Just days prior, USS Tennessee (SSBN-734) made a port visit to HMNB Clyde in Scotland. This was allegedly conducted as a show of force and to demonstrate the capabilities of the U.S. SSBN Fleet. During the visit, the President of South Korea Yoon Suk Yeol and First Lady Kim Keon-hee toured the submarine. U.S. General Paul LaCamera, commander of the ROK-U.S. Combined Forces Command, called the USS Kentucky a strategic American asset for extended deterrence, adding that the first visit by an American SSBN to Korea in over 40 years shows the "ironclad U.S. commitment to defending the Republic of Korea."
