= Submarine Squadron 20 =

- Active: present
- Country: United States
- Branch: United States Navy
- Garrison/HQ: Naval Submarine Base Kings Bay, Georgia

Commanders
- Current commander: Captain John E. Cage

Submarine Squadron 20 is a United States Navy unit responsible for the maintenance and operation of five Ohio-class ballistic missile submarines.

== Military service ==
The Squadron is currently stationed at the Kings Bay Naval Base, Georgia, and operates alongside the guided missile submarines of Squadron 16 under the broader umbrella of Submarine Group Trident. The five Ohio-class submarines under the command of Squadron 20 are USS Alaska, USS Tennessee, USS West Virginia, USS Maryland, and USS Wyoming. These submarines carry the Trident missile and act as components of the United States' global presence for strategic deterrence. As a result, the Squadron is responsible for the continued operation, maintenance and certification of all U.S. ballistic missile submarines in the Atlantic fleet.

In December 2011, two of the Squadron's submarines, USS Georgia and USS Wyoming, become some of the first US submarines to include women officers in their crews. Though women had been allowed to serve in combat roles in the rest of the Navy since 1993, there was concern that the cramped spaces onboard and long tours of submarine crews were unsuitable for women. This was the first step in the plan to fully integrate women onto all US Navy submarines. It was begun on the ballistic missile submarines because of their larger size as compared to the attack submarines, though there was the intent to eventually include those vessels as well in the future (and did begin in January 2015). Beginning in 2016, the Navy planned to add female non-commissioned officers to submarine crews that already included female officers with the intent to eventually bring the number of women among the enlisted crew up to 20%. Despite a few setbacks, including allegations that male sailors had secretly videotaped female shipmates in dressing areas, this process of integration continued. The first group of enlisted female sailors joined the crew of a submarine, though not one of Squadron 20's, in 2016.

== Current organization ==
- Commander, Submarine Squadron 20 (CSS 20):
  - Ohio-class submarines:
    - USS Alaska (SSBN-732)
    - USS Tennessee (SSBN-734)
    - USS West Virginia (SSBN-736)
    - USS Maryland (SSBN-738)
    - USS Rhode Island (SSBN-740)
    - USS Wyoming (SSBN-742)
