= USS Maine (SSBN-741) =

Submarine of the United States

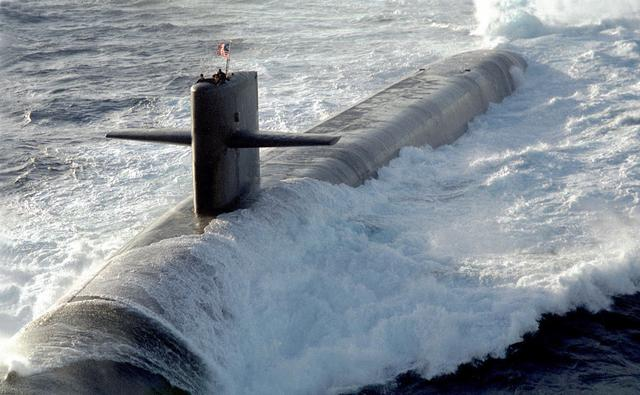
- USS Maine (SSBN-741) in the Caribbean Sea approximately 50 nautical miles (93 kilometers) due south of Naval Station Roosevelt Roads, Puerto Rico.

History

United States
- Namesake: The U.S. state of Maine
- Ordered: 5 October 1988
- Builder: General Dynamics Electric Boat
- Laid down: 3 July 1990
- Launched: 16 July 1994
- Commissioned: 29 July 1995
- Home port: Bangor, Washington
- Motto: Leadership, Peace, Vigilance
- Status: in active service
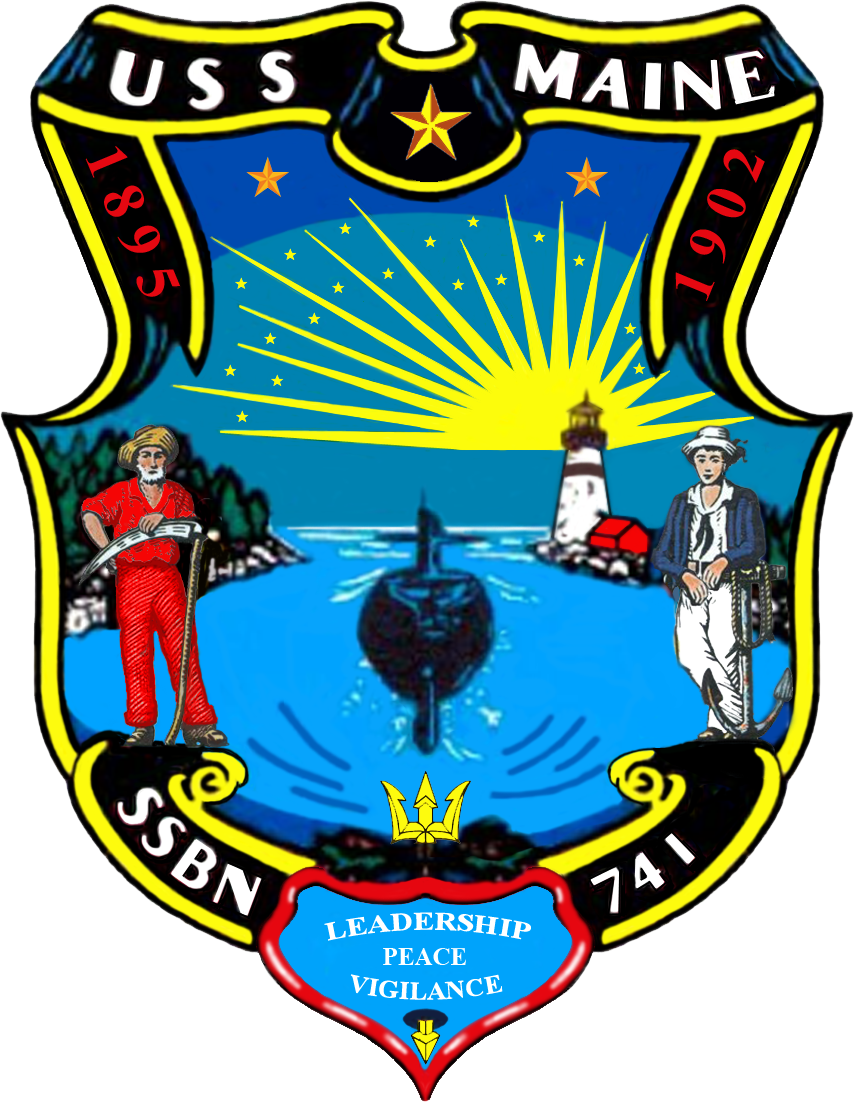
- Badge

General characteristics
- Class & type: Ohio-class ballistic missile submarine
- Displacement: 16,764 long tons (17,033 t) surfaced; 18,750 long tons (19,050 t) submerged
- Length: 560 ft (170 m)
- Beam: 42 ft (13 m)
- Draft: 38 ft (12 m)
- Propulsion: 1 × S8G PWR nuclear reactor (HEU 93.5%); 2 × geared turbines; 1 × 325 hp (242 kW) auxiliary motor; 1 × shaft @ 60,000 shp (45,000 kW)
- Speed: Greater than 25 knots (46 km/h; 29 mph)
- Test depth: Greater than 800 feet (240 m)
- Complement: 15 officers; 140 enlisted
- Armament: MK-48 torpedoes; 20 × Trident II D-5 ballistic missiles

USS Maine (hull number SSBN-741) is a United States Navy Ohio-class ballistic missile submarine in commission since 1995. She is the fourth U.S. Navy ship authorized, and the third commissioned, to be named in honor of the state of Maine. She has the capability to carry 24 nuclear armed Trident ballistic missiles.

== Construction and commissioning ==
The contract to build Maine was awarded to the Electric Boat Division of the General Dynamics Corporation, Groton, Connecticut, on 5 October 1988, and her keel was laid there on 3 July 1990. Maine was launched on 16 July 1994, delivered to the U.S. Navy on 23 June 1995, and commissioned on 29 July 1995 at the Portsmouth Navy Yard, on the shore of its namesake state.

== Service history ==
Maine has been homeported at Naval Base Kitsap, Bangor, Washington since December 2005. Prior to this, she was homeported at Naval Submarine Base Kings Bay from August 1995 until December 2005.

== Maine in fiction ==
- The Maine plays a major role in Tom Clancy's novel The Sum of All Fears.
