= Submarine Squadron 16 =

- Active: 1941–1945; 1963–1994; 1997–present
- Country: United States
- Branch: United States Navy
- Garrison/HQ: Naval Submarine Base Kings Bay, Georgia

Commanders
- Current commander: Capt. Adam D. Palmer

Submarine Squadron 16 is a United States Navy unit that served in World War II and the Cold War before being deactivated in the 1990s. It was reactivated in 1997 and now is responsible for the maintenance and operation of two guided-missile submarines (SSGNs) and one ballistic-missile submarine (SSBN) based in Kings Bay, Georgia.

== World War II service ==
Squadron 16 was first established in World War II. It was credited with sinking more than 500,000 tons of enemy shipping. It was deactivated following the war. In the course of its service, the Squadron was awarded the Presidential Unit Citation and six Navy Unit Commendations.

== Cold War service ==
Squadron 16 was recommissioned in Charleston, South Carolina on October 18, 1963 and was given command of the second nuclear-missile submarine squadron to exist in the US Navy. The Squadron was deployed to Rota, Spain on January 28, 1964, from which it conducted routine deterrent patrols. Between early 1970 and January 1974, the Squadron's submarines were converted to handle the Poseidon missile, replacing the previously used Polaris missile. Following treaty renegotiations between the United States and Spain in 1975, Squadron 16 withdrew from Rota and moved to the Kings Bay Naval Base in southeastern Georgia. The Squadron was deactivated on June 25, 1994 as part of the draw-down in US submarine forces following the Cold War.

During its time in Rota, submarines USS Lafayette and USS Francis Scott Key were included in Squadron 16, though they did not remain with it for the entirety of its Cold War service.

== Current service ==
Submarine Squadron 16 was reactivated on August 8, 1997 as part of a reorganization within the Navy to provide better support to its smaller units. Originally, the squadron was intended to evenly split the command of the ten submarines stationed at Kings Bay with the other squadron stationed there, Submarine Squadron 20. These two squadrons operated jointly beginning in 2005 after the number of submarines at Kings Bay dropped to six. They continued joint operations until 2009, at which point Squadron 16 took command of the SSGNs present at Kings Bay, while Squadron 20 became in control of the SSBNs. Following the separation ceremony, the two squadrons also took on different focal point for their future planning and operations. For Squadron 16, this was to "focus on the emerging operation SSGN multi-mission capability and [to] build on the excellence already established in strike warfare and special operations forces delivery and support, among many other missions while supporting SSBNs during and after overhaul periods."

- Commander, Submarine Squadron 16 (CSS 16):
  - Ohio-class submarines:
    - USS Florida (SSGN-728)
    - USS Georgia (SSGN-729)
  - Columbia-class submarines:
    - Pre-Commissioning Unit (PCU) USS District of Columbia (SSBN-826)
