= USS Alaska (SSBN-732) =

Submarine of the United States

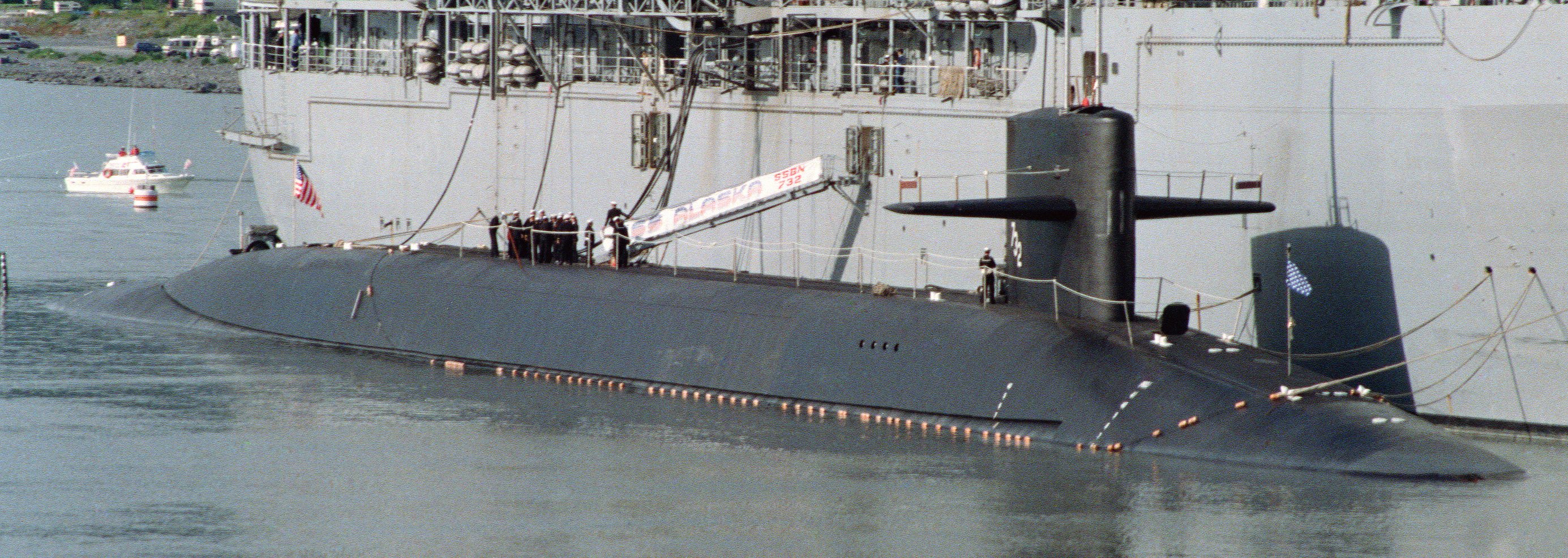
- USS Alaska (SSBN-732)

History

United States
- Name: Alaska
- Namesake: State of Alaska
- Ordered: 27 February 1978
- Builder: General Dynamics Electric Boat, Groton, Connecticut
- Laid down: 9 March 1983
- Launched: 12 January 1985
- Commissioned: 25 January 1986
- Home port: Kings Bay, Georgia
- Identification: Hull symbol: SSBN-732; Code letters: NALK
- Motto: Alert, Confident, Able
- Status: in active service
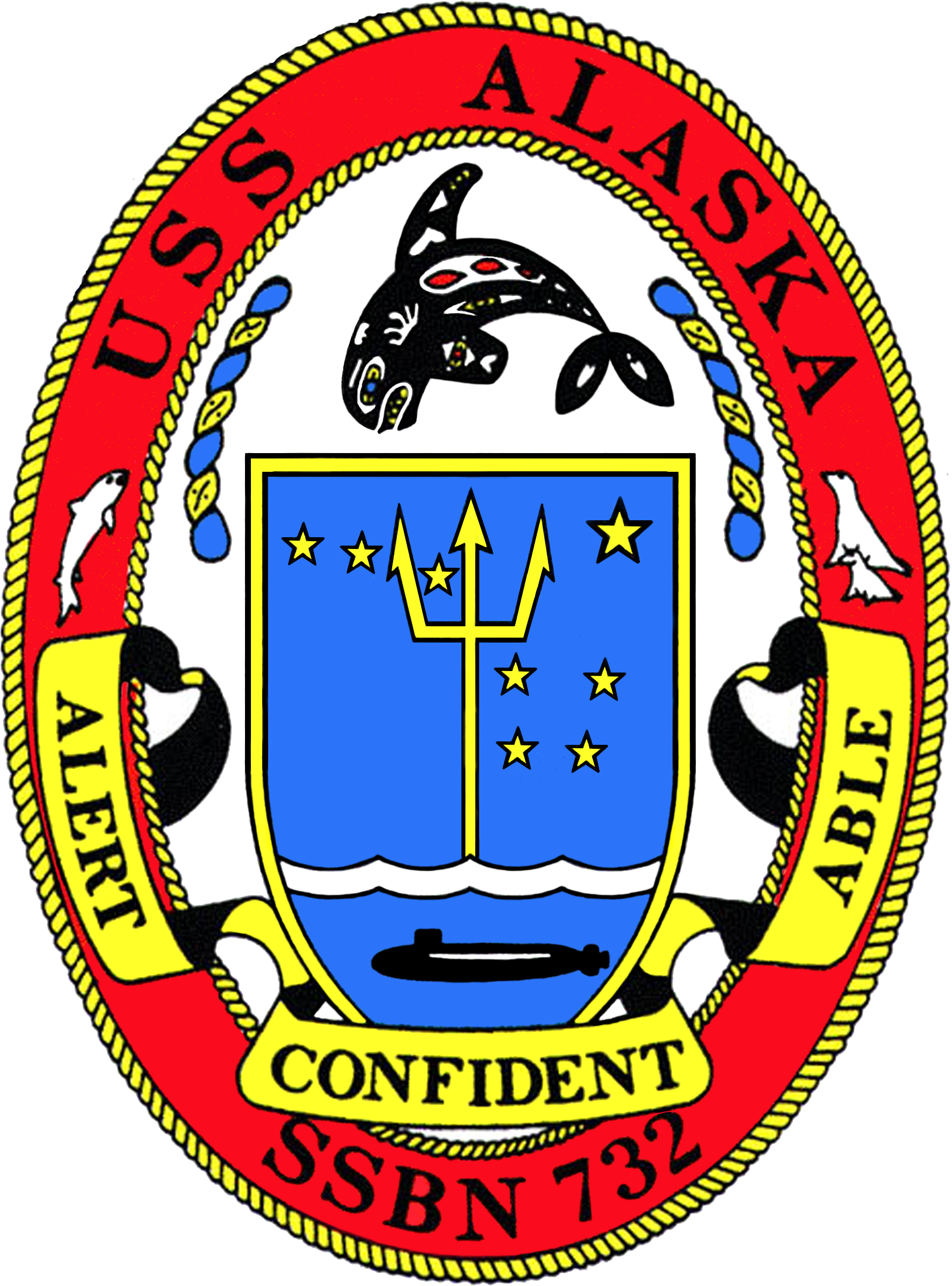
- Badge

General characteristics
- Class & type: Ohio-class ballistic missile submarine
- Displacement: 16,764 long tons (17,033 t) surfaced; 18,750 long tons (19,050 t) submerged
- Length: 560 ft (170 m)
- Beam: 42 ft (13 m)
- Draft: 38 ft (12 m)
- Propulsion: 1 × S8G PWR nuclear reactor (HEU 93.5%); 2 × geared turbines; 1 × 325 hp (242 kW) auxiliary motor; 1 × shaft @ 60,000 shp (45,000 kW)
- Speed: Greater than 25 knots (46 km/h; 29 mph)
- Test depth: Greater than 800 feet (240 m)
- Complement: 15 officers; 140 enlisted
- Armament: MK-48 torpedoes; 20 × Trident II D-5 ballistic missiles

USS Alaska (hull number SSBN-732), is a United States Navy Ohio-class ballistic missile submarine which has been in commission since 1986. She is the fourth US Navy ship to be named for the Territory or State of Alaska.

== Construction and commissioning ==
The contract to build Alaska was awarded to the Electric Boat Division of General Dynamics Corporation in Groton, Connecticut, on 27 February 1978 and her keel was laid down there on 9 March 1983. She was launched on 12 January 1985, sponsored by Mrs. Catherine Stevens, wife of US Senator Theodore F. Stevens of Alaska; and commissioned on 25 January 1986, with Captain Paul L. Callahan in command of the Blue Crew and Captain Charles J. Chotvacs in command of the Gold Crew.

== Service history ==
Alaska spent much of 1986 engaged in shakedown training for her two crews and in clearing up the many details that attend a new fleet ballistic missile submarine's addition to the Fleet. She operated initially from New London, Connecticut, and Port Canaveral, Florida, but shifted homeport to the Pacific Northwest later in the year, 4 September to 1 October 1986. Alaska sailed through the Panama Canal, and visited San Francisco, California, 21–29 September, while en route. She then served with Submarine Squadron 17, Submarine Group 9, at Naval Submarine Base Bangor, Washington. Alaska sailed on her first missile deterrent patrol, manned by her Blue Crew, in the Pacific, 7 December 1986 to 19 February 1987. Her Gold Crew carried out Patrol 2, 16 March to 28 May 1987.

She completed an engineered overhaul at Puget Sound Naval Shipyard, Bremerton, Washington, 1 May 2000 to 9 December 2001. The work included a Trident II D5 "backfit" that enabled Alaska to fire the improved version of the submarine launched ballistic missile. In addition, the overhaul upgraded her to shoot the Mk 48 Advanced Capability (ADCAP) torpedo. Alaska had carried out 47 Trident I C4 and 12 Trident II D5 deterrent missile patrols when she sailed from Kitsap for the final time on 8 July 2006. The submarine subsequently completed a 27½-month engineered refueling and overhaul at Norfolk Naval Shipyard, Virginia, on 8 March 2009. Alaska shifted to Submarine Squadron 20, Submarine Group 10, at Naval Submarine Base Kings Bay, Georgia, on 1 May 2009; she arrived at Kings Bay on 1 April. On 28 April 2010, the Navy announced plans to convert living spaces on Alaska to accommodate female crewmembers.

On 11 May 2026, the United States dispatched Alaska to Gibraltar to put pressure on Iran during the 2026 Iran war.

== Awards ==
Alaska was awarded the Navy Battle Efficiency "E" ("Battle E") award for 2004, 2011, 2012, 2014, 2016, 2018, 2019, and 2021 as the most efficient unit in her squadron. She also received the United States Strategic Command (USSTRATCOM) Omaha Trophy for 2005, 2011, 2012, 2014, 2016, 2019 and 2021. The Omaha Trophy reflects the ability of an SSBN to execute its primary mission, emphasizing strategic deterrence and its evolving role in global operations.

Alaska was recognized with the Meritorious Unit Commendation for meritorious service from Oct. 2011 to Dec. 2013 during which the ship maintained superior weapons, navigation, and communications readiness, providing an invaluable asset for the strategic forces of the United States.

Alaska was recognized with the Meritorious Unit Commendation for meritorious service from 2016 to 2018 during which the ship maintained superior weapons, navigation, and communications readiness, providing an invaluable asset for the strategic forces of the United States.

Additionally, she was awarded the 2014 Battenberg Cup as the best ship or submarine in the Atlantic fleet. She is the first ballistic missile submarine in history to win the award.

== Notes ==
Citations

== Bibliography ==
Online resources

- Cressman, Robert J.; Evans, Mark L. (11 June 2015). "Alaska IV (SSBN-732)". Naval History and Heritage Command. Archived from the original on 2 June 2019. This article incorporates text from this source, which is in the public domain.
