= USS West Virginia (SSBN-736) =

Submarine of the United States

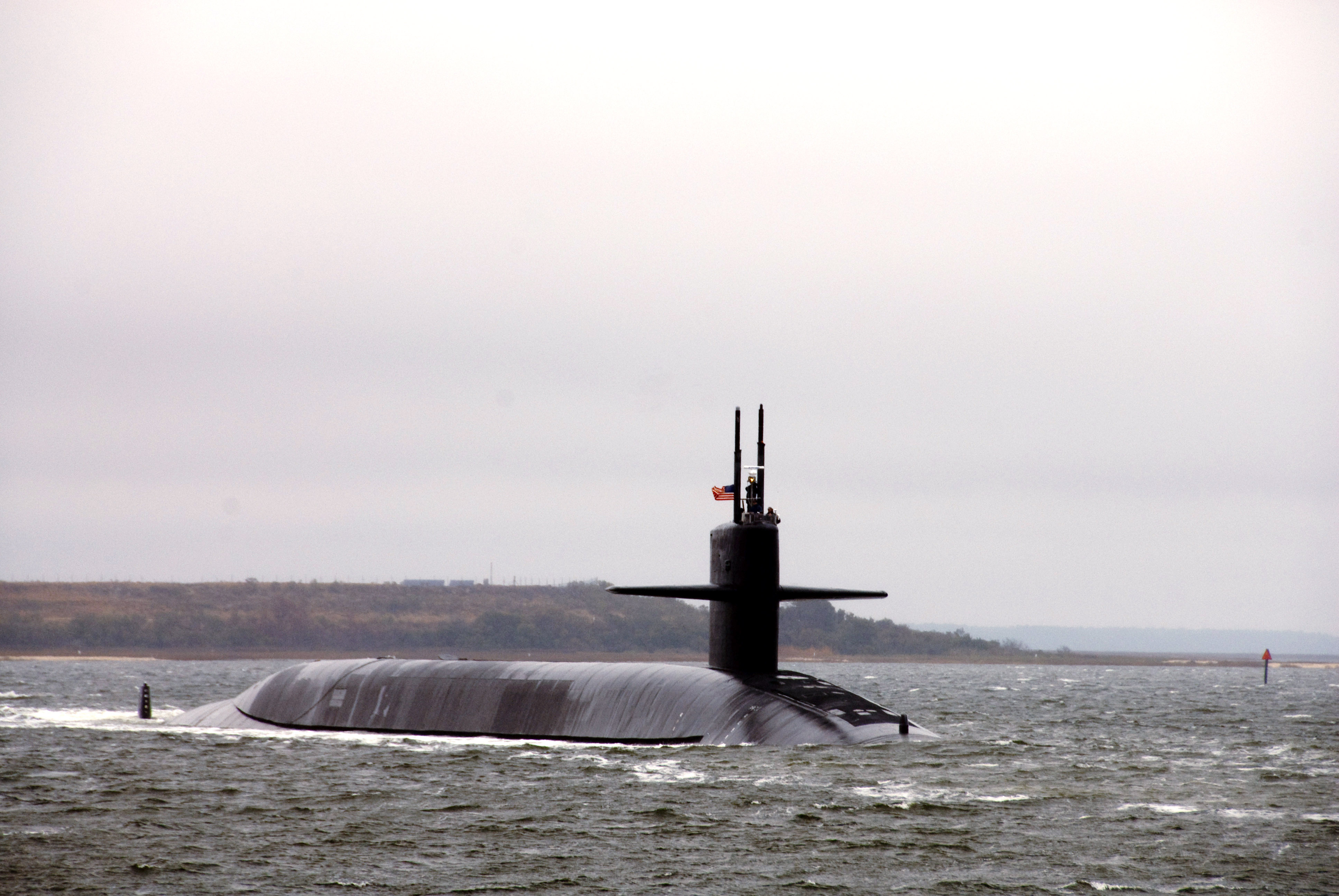
- USS West Virginia (SSBN-736)

History

United States
- Name: West Virginia
- Namesake: The State of West Virginia
- Ordered: 21 November 1983
- Builder: General Dynamics Electric Boat, Groton, Connecticut
- Laid down: 24 December 1987
- Launched: 14 October 1989
- Sponsored by: Mrs. Erma Byrd
- Commissioned: 20 October 1990
- Home port: Kings Bay, Georgia
- Identification: Hull number: SSBN-736
- Motto: Montani Semper Liberi; ("Mountaineers are Always Free")
- Nickname(s): The Silent Mountaineer
- Status: in active service
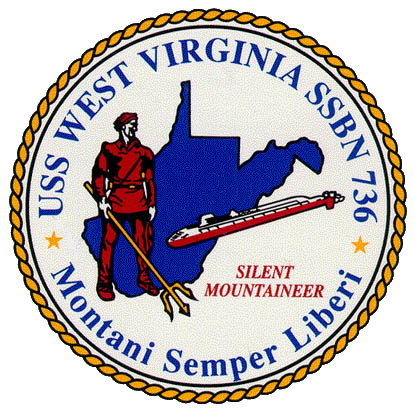
- Badge

General characteristics
- Class & type: Ohio-class ballistic missile submarine
- Displacement: 16,764 long tons (17,033 t) surfaced; 18,750 long tons (19,050 t) submerged
- Length: 560 ft (170 m)
- Beam: 42 ft (13 m)
- Draft: 38 ft (12 m)
- Propulsion: 1 × S8G PWR nuclear reactor (HEU 93.5%); 2 × geared turbines; 1 × 325 hp (242 kW) auxiliary motor; 1 × shaft @ 60,000 shp (45,000 kW)
- Speed: Greater than 25 knots (46 km/h; 29 mph)
- Test depth: Greater than 800 feet (240 m)
- Complement: 15 officers; 140 enlisted
- Armament: MK-48 torpedoes; 20 × Trident II D-5 ballistic missiles

USS West Virginia (hull number SSBN-736) is a United States Navy Ohio-class ballistic missile submarine. Commissioned on 20 October 1990, she is the third U.S. Navy ship to be named for West Virginia, the 35th state, and the 11th of 18 Ohio-class submarines.

== Construction and commissioning ==
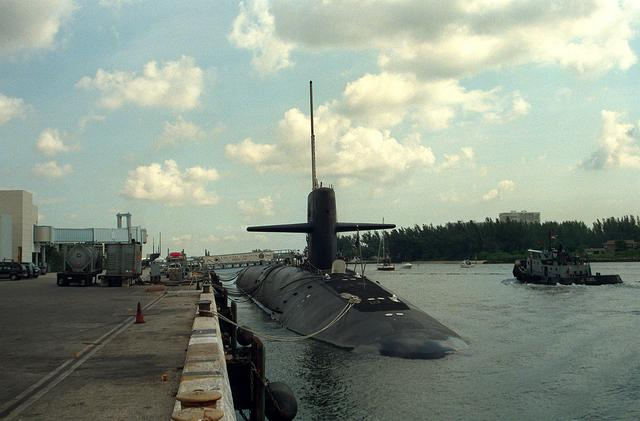
USS West Virginia (SSBN-736) at Port Everglades, Florida, on 4 May 1994.

The contract to build West Virginia was awarded to the Electric Boat Division of General Dynamics Corporation in Groton, Connecticut, on 21 November 1983 and her keel was laid down there on 24 December 1987. She was launched at Electric Boat in Groton Connecticut on 14 October 1989, sponsored by Mrs. Erma Byrd, wife of United States Senator Robert C. Byrd of West Virginia, and commissioned on 20 October 1990, in the dry-dock of the Kings Bay Georgia Submarine Base, with Captain J. R. Harvey in command of the Blue Crew and Captain Donald McDermott in command of the Gold Crew.

== Service history ==
West Virginia is based at Naval Submarine Base Kings Bay, Georgia.

On 29 December 2008, Captain Daniel Mack, commander of Submarine Squadron 16/20, relieved West Virginia's commanding officer, Commander Charles "Tony" Hill, of command "due to a loss of confidence" in Hill's ability to command. Captain Stephen Gillespie was assigned as West Virginia's temporary commanding officer.

In September 2010 the approximate 300 Sailors assigned to the two crews that alternate patrols on West Virginia merged into one crew of about 110 sailors during the overhaul and refueling, which was done at the Norfolk Navy Shipyard (NNSY) in Portsmouth, Virginia, beginning in early 2011. Commander Adam D. Palmer relieved Commander Steven K. Hall as commanding officer of West Virginia during a change of command ceremony 9 September at Naval Medical Center in Portsmouth, Virginia. Commander Joseph W. Coleman relieved Commander Palmer during a change of command ceremony 25 November 2014 at St. Mary's Waterfront in St. Mary's, Georgia.

On 24 October 2013, West Virginia departed Norfolk Naval Shipyard after a thirty-month refuel and overhaul. On 3 November 2013 she returned to her homeport of Kings Bay, Georgia.

On 25 October 2022, West Virginia became the first SSBN to dock at remote British territory island of Diego Garcia .

== Community Support ==
West Virginia's Blue and Gold crew members regularly return to the state of West Virginia to participate in parades, community service projects and initiatives. West Virginia's commissioning crew established a relationship with the West Virginia Children's Home (WVCH) in 1990. WVCH Director Carson Markley, who attended the ship's commissioning, appreciates the special bond between the ship and the WVCH.

The children at the West Virginia Children's Home have generally been neglected, abused and feel that no one cares for them. The crew of USS West Virginia almost immediately, upon arriving at the home, began to show concern and a real understanding for not just a few, but all the kids they come into contact with,

— Carson Markley.

== West Virginia in fiction ==
- In Tom Clancy's 1994 novel Debt of Honor, West Virginia is one of several submarines sent to deal with a Japanese invasion of the Northern Mariana Islands. She is used as a "slow-attack" submarine, relying on her stealthiness and her torpedo tubes in combating Japanese forces.
- In one scenario of the History Channel series Doomsday, West Virginia and her crew are (briefly) the last surviving remnant of Earth after it is destroyed by a rogue planet, momentarily kept preserved in ocean water sucked off the planet as Earth is ripped apart due to gravitational tidal forces from the rogue planet's Roche limit.
