= USS Maryland (SSBN-738) =

Submarine of the United States

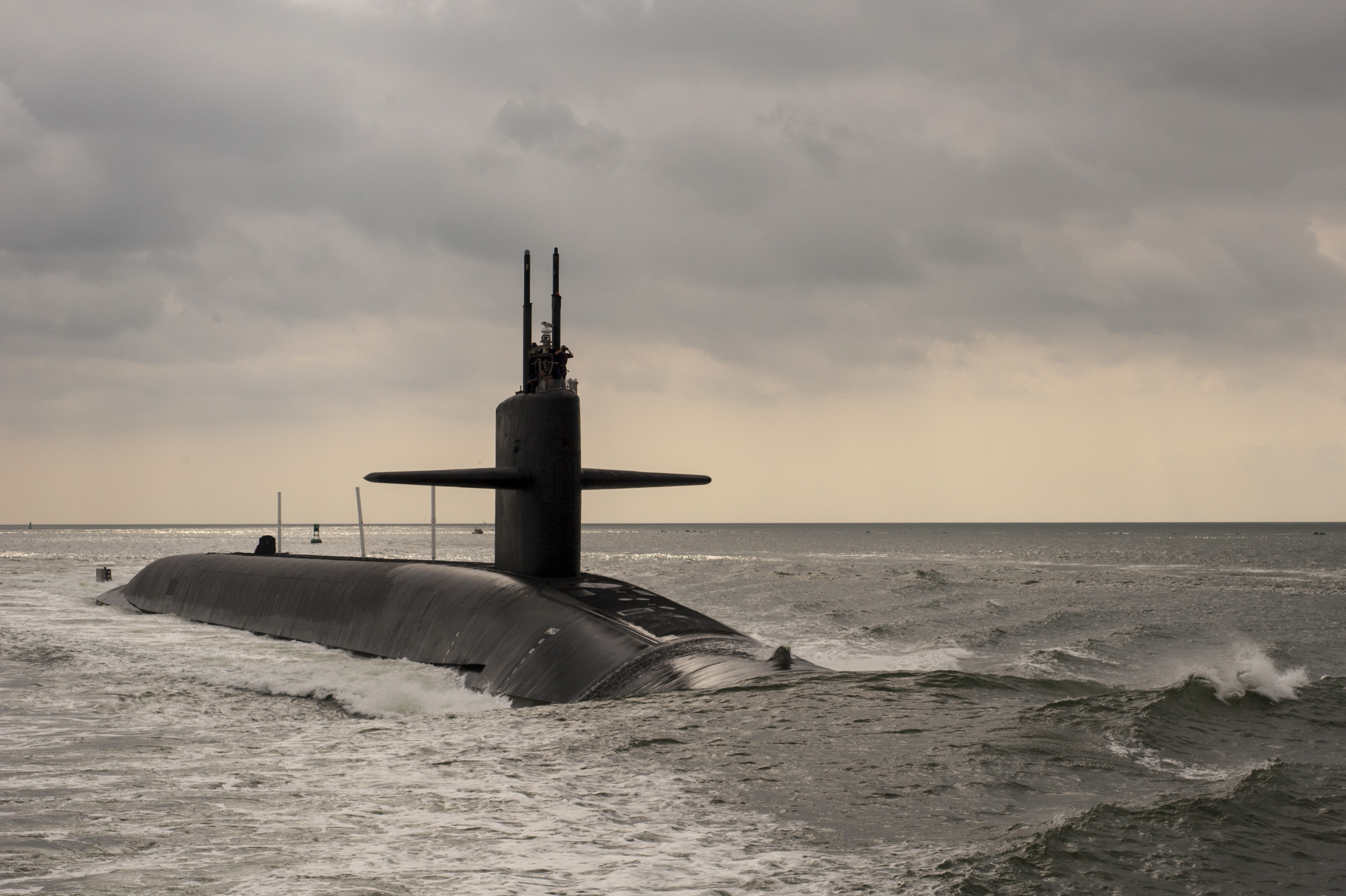
- USS Maryland (SSBN-738)

History

United States
- Namesake: State of Maryland
- Ordered: 14 March 1986
- Builder: General Dynamics Electric Boat, Groton, Connecticut
- Laid down: 22 April 1986
- Launched: 10 August 1991
- Sponsored by: Sarah "Sally" Craig Larson
- Commissioned: 13 June 1992
- Home port: Kings Bay, Georgia
- Motto: Timete Deum Solum et Ignominiam; ("Fear Only God and Dishonor")
- Nickname(s): "Fighting Mary"
- Status: in active service
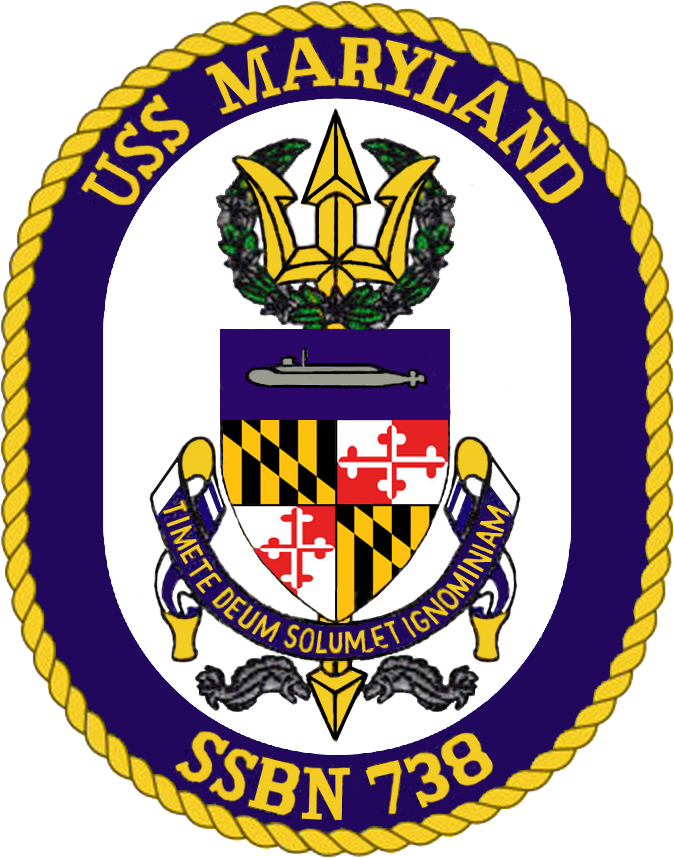
- Badge

General characteristics
- Class & type: Ohio-class ballistic missile submarine
- Displacement: 16,764 long tons (17,033 t) surfaced; 18,750 long tons (19,050 t) submerged
- Length: 560 ft (170 m)
- Beam: 42 ft (13 m)
- Draft: 38 ft (12 m)
- Propulsion: 1 × S8G PWR nuclear reactor (HEU 93.5%); 2 × geared turbines; 1 × 325 hp (242 kW) auxiliary motor; 1 × shaft @ 60,000 shp (45,000 kW)
- Speed: Greater than 25 knots (46 km/h; 29 mph)
- Test depth: Greater than 800 feet (240 m)
- Complement: 15 officers; 140 enlisted
- Armament: MK-48 torpedoes; 20 × Trident II D-5 ballistic missiles

USS Maryland (hull number SSBN-738) is an Ohio-class submarine in the United States Navy. Maryland is the 13th of the 18 Ohio-class ballistic missile submarines, and has been in active service since 1992.

Maryland is the fourth US Navy vessel to be named after the US state of Maryland. Her mission is to provide the United States government with an undetectable and unattackable nuclear launch platform in support of the national strategy of strategic deterrence. The contract for the construction of the Maryland was awarded on 14 March 1986. Her keel was laid down by the Electric Boat Division of the General Dynamics Corporation at Groton, Connecticut, on 22 April 1986.

== Christening and launching ==
Maryland was christened and launched on 10 August 1991 during a ceremony held at the Electric Boat shipyard. Vice Admiral Kenneth C. Malley, Commander, Naval Sea Systems Command, Vice Admiral Henry G. Chiles, Jr., Commander Submarine Force US Atlantic Fleet and Helen Delich Bentley, the U.S. representative for Maryland's 2nd congressional district were in attendance, along with ship sponsor, Sarah Craig Larson, wife of Admiral Charles R. Larson.

== Commissioning ==
On 13 June 1992, Maryland was formally commissioned into US Naval service. The principal speaker was Admiral Charles R. Larson, Commander-in-Chief U.S. Pacific Command.

== Service history ==
Maryland departed Groton for Kings Bay on 15 June 1992 and immediately started preparation for strategic certification, with a successful test launch on 29 Jul 1992, and starting Trident D-5 missile Demonstration and Shakedown Operations (DASO) on 7 July 1992. DASO was completed on 22 October 1992. Various other inspections and training exercises were conducted throughout 1992. Maryland returned to Groton on 30 January 1993 for post-shakedown maintenance prior to assuming responsibility for strategic deterrent patrols. Maryland returned to Kings Bay, Georgia on 9 April 1993. Maryland completed various weapons and tactical certifications and then returned to Kings Bay on 4 May 1993 to join Submarine Squadron 20 and commence preparations for the first strategic deterrent patrol. The initial loadout of Trident D-5 missiles was completed at this point. On 19 June 1993 Maryland went underway on her first strategic deterrent patrol, which started her strategic patrol cycle. On 21 September 2012 Maryland combined crews in preparation for mid-life refueling and overhaul at Norfolk Naval Ship Yard.

=== Grounding ===
On 24 September 1993, Maryland ran aground at Port Canaveral, Florida, after conducting a medical evacuation of an ill crew member, and returned to Kings Bay to inspect for damage. Damage to the submarine was minimal, and the investigation found that the crew was not responsible. Maryland then resumed her second deterrent patrol on 26 September 1993.

=== Trident SLBM missile testing ===
Maryland has been involved in several Follow-on Commander's Evaluation Tests (FCET) of its Trident D-5 SLBM missile system. The FCET launches a specially modified missile without a nuclear payload, and is used to test the performance of the Trident missile system.

- FCET 10, performed 3 January 1994. 4 missiles launched.
- FCET 14, performed 21 April 1996. 2 missiles launched.
- FCET 21, performed 26 April 1999. 2 missiles launched.
- FCET 30, performed 5 November 2003. 2 missiles launched.
- FCET 36, performed 21 November 2006. 2 missiles launched.
- FCET 42, performed 8 June 2010. 2 missiles launched.
- FCET 43, performed 9 June 2010. 2 missiles launched.

=== Live fire exercise ===
On 16 October 2001, Maryland joined the USS John F. Kennedy (CV-67) Carrier Battle Group in a sink exercise. Maryland fired one Mark 48 torpedo which sank ex-USS Guam (LPH-9).

=== Awards ===
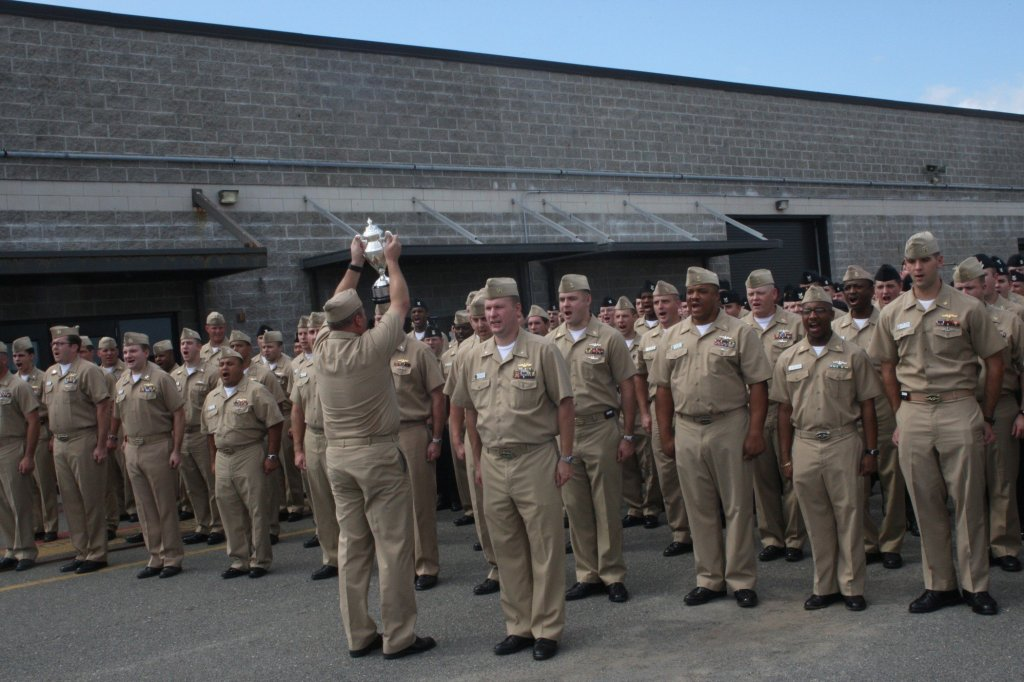
2008 Omaha Trophy presented Maryland's Blue and Gold crews

Maryland has been the recipient of many awards, including the following:

- 1995 Submarine Squadron 20 Battle "E" award (both crews).
- 1997 Submarine Squadron 20 Battle "E" award (both crews).
- 2001 Submarine Squadron 20 Battle "E" award (Blue crew).
- 2002 Submarine Squadron 20 Battle "E" award (both crews).
- 2003 Captain Edward F. Ney Memorial award (for outstanding food service) (Gold crew).
- 2004 Submarine Squadron 16 Battle "E" award (both crews).
- 2005 Chief of Naval Operations Afloat Safety award (Blue crew).
- 2008 Submarine Squadron 20 Battle "E" award (both crews).
- 2008 Omaha Trophy winner (both crews). This prestigious award is given to the strategic command with the highest performance standards.
- 2009 Submarine Squadron 20 Battle "E" award (both crews).

=== Current status ===
Maryland is currently part of both United States Fleet Forces Command Submarine Squadron 20 and the United States Strategic Command. Her home port is Naval Submarine Base Kings Bay, Georgia.

== Symbolism of the Maryland insignia ==
Dark blue and gold are the colors traditionally associated with the United States Navy. The arms of Maryland hail the state's historical roots, while the submarine indicates the present-day Maryland is an Ohio-class submarine. The trident represents U.S. Navy weaponry and sea prowess; its bottom spike points to the ocean depths, the area of Maryland's operations. The heraldic dolphins symbolize speed, intelligence, and the ability to penetrate the deep. The laurel wreath is emblematic of excellence and accomplishment; its seven stars commemorate both the seven battle stars that battleship USS Maryland (BB-46) earned in World War II and that the state of Maryland was the seventh state to be admitted to the Union.

=== Seal ===
Maryland's coat of arms is emblazoned upon a white oval enclosed by a blue collar edged on the outside with gold rope and is inscribed in gold letters with the words "USS Maryland" above, and "SSBN-738" below.

=== Blazon ===
The shield features the arms of the state of Maryland, which historically derives from the quartered arms of the Calvert and Crossland families. Its main color is blue, highlighted with silver. Beneath the shield is a scroll in blue, displaying the motto Timete Deum Solum et Ignominiam ("Fear Only God and Dishonor") inscribed in gold letters. This is all superimposed upon a trident wreathed in laurel decorated with seven stars. The trident's bottom spike is flanked by two dolphins.

== In popular culture ==
- In the 1994 Tom Clancy novel, Debt of Honor, Maryland is one of several submarines sent to deal with a Japanese invasion of the Northern Mariana Islands.
- In the 1998 television film Ice, Maryland is sent to evacuate VIPs from the frozen West Coast of the United States after the coastline has become ice-bound, preventing surface vessels from approaching the shore.
