= USS Secota =

Tugboat of the United States Navy

History

United States
- Namesake: Derived from Secotan, an Algonquin tribe.
- Builder: Coast Guard Yard, Curtis Bay, Maryland
- Laid down: 29 April 1944
- Launched: 4 August 1944
- Commissioned: 23 December 1944
- Reclassified: District Harbor Tug, Medium YTM-415, February 1962
- Fate: Sunk in collision, 22 March 1986

General characteristics
- Class & type: Sassaba-class harbor tug
- Type: Harbor Tug
- Displacement: 237 tons
- Length: 100 ft (30 m)
- Beam: 25 ft (7.6 m)
- Draft: 9 ft 7 in (2.92 m)
- Speed: 12 kn (22 km/h; 14 mph)
- Complement: 10
- Armament: 2 x .50-caliber machine guns

USS Secota (YTB-415) was a harbor tug that served in the United States Navy from 1945 to 1986.

Secota was assigned to the United States Pacific Fleet soon after delivery to the Navy. She was at Okinawa in August 1945; visited Qingdao, China in July 1946; and replaced USS Anamosa at Yokosuka, Japan, on 20 August 1947.

During 1950, Secota visited Hungnam and Pusan, Korea; her last recorded port of call was Sasebo, Japan, apparently returning to Japan from Korea during the waning days of 1950. After that time, Secota was continuously assigned to advanced American bases in the Pacific. In February 1962 she was redesignated a medium harbor tug, YTM-415.

On 22 March 1986, near Midway Island, Secota had just completed a personnel transfer with the USS Georgia when Secota lost power and collided with Georgia. Secota lost power before it was clear, causing an impact with the sub's stern dive planes, where the tug got hung up. Secota sank; ten crewman were rescued, but two crewmen trapped in the engine room drowned. While the media reported that the Georgia was undamaged, a report sent by the commanding officer of the Georgia indicates that after returning the surviving crew members to Hawaii, Georgia underwent emergency repairs for minor damage sustained in the collision.
