= USS Tennessee (SSBN-734) =

Submarine of the United States

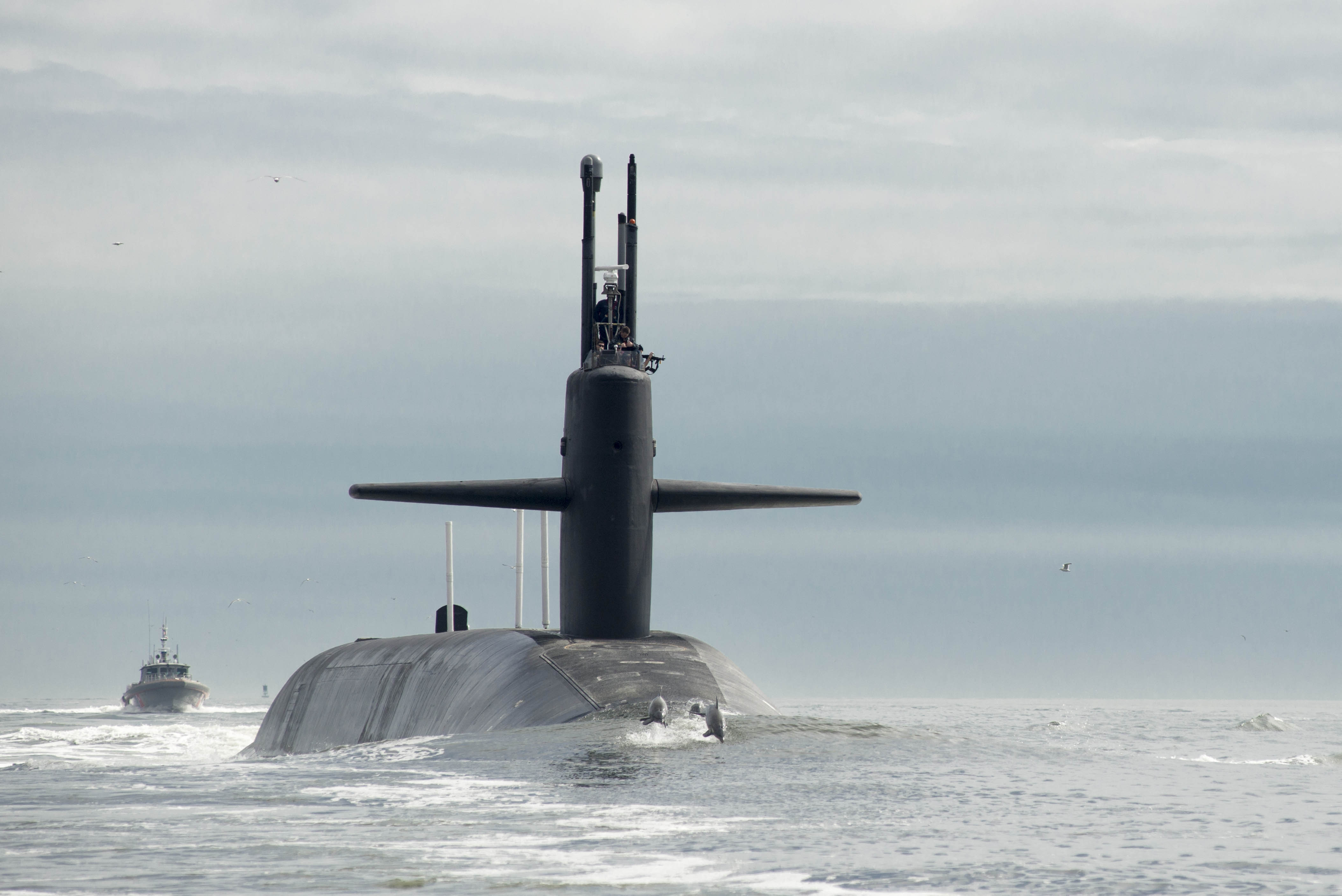
- USS Tennessee (SSBN-734)

History

United States
- Namesake: The U.S. state of Tennessee
- Ordered: 7 January 1982
- Builder: General Dynamics Electric Boat, Groton, Connecticut
- Laid down: 9 June 1984
- Launched: 13 December 1986
- Sponsored by: Mrs. Landess Kelso
- Commissioned: 17 December 1988
- Home port: Kings Bay, Georgia
- Motto: America at Its Best
- Status: in active service
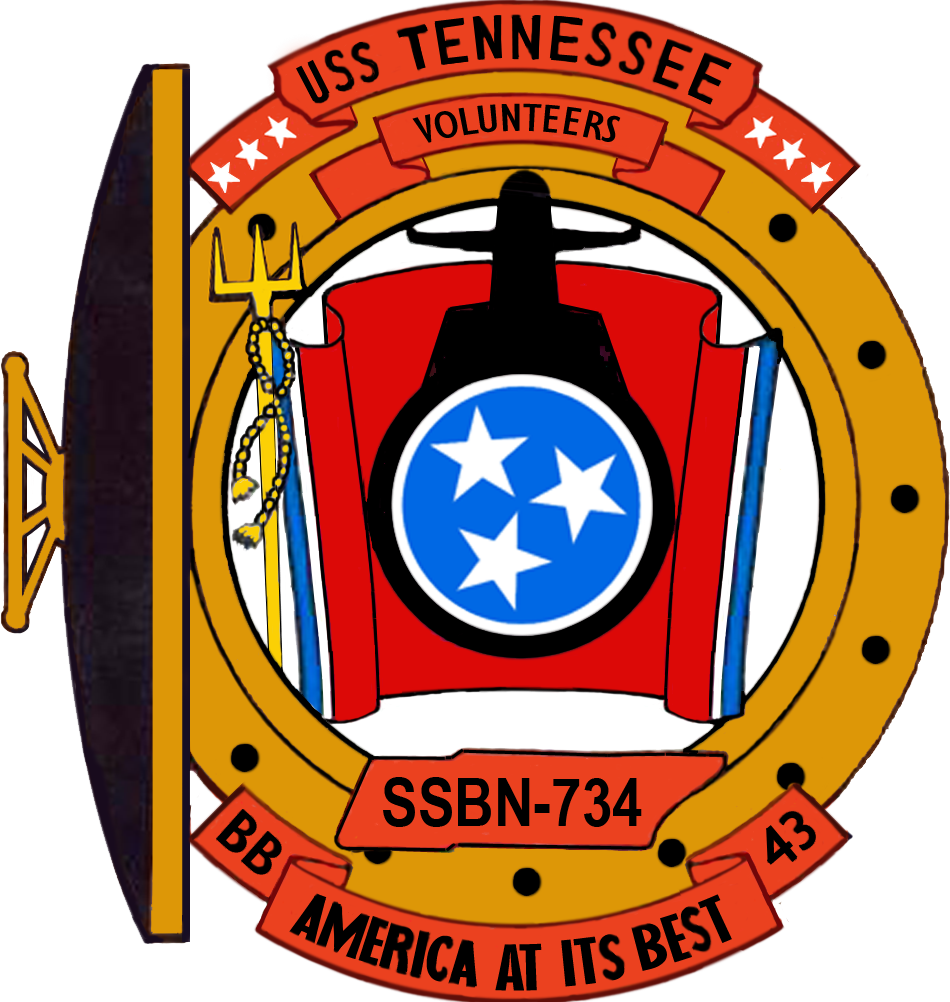
- Badge

General characteristics
- Class & type: Ohio-class ballistic missile submarine
- Displacement: 16,764 long tons (17,033 t) surfaced; 18,750 long tons (19,050 t) submerged
- Length: 560 ft (170 m)
- Beam: 42 ft (13 m)
- Draft: 38 ft (12 m)
- Propulsion: 1 × S8G PWR nuclear reactor (HEU 93.5%); 2 × geared turbines; 1 × 325 hp (242 kW) auxiliary motor; 1 × shaft @ 60,000 shp (45,000 kW)
- Speed: Greater than 25 knots (46 km/h; 29 mph)
- Test depth: Greater than 800 feet (240 m)
- Complement: 15 officers; 140 enlisted
- Armament: MK-48 torpedoes; 20 × Trident II D-5 ballistic missiles

USS Tennessee (hull number SSBN-734) is a United States Navy Ohio-class ballistic missile submarine that has been in commission since 1988. She is the fourth ship and first submarine of the U.S. Navy to be named for Tennessee, the 16th state. (Note: Two ships of the Confederate States Navy were named CSS Tennessee.)

== Construction and commissioning ==
Tennessee's construction was authorized in fiscal year 1980, and the contract to build her was awarded to the Electric Boat Division of General Dynamics Corporation in Groton, Connecticut, on 7 January 1982. Her keel was laid down there on 9 June 1984. She was launched on 13 December 1986, sponsored by Mrs. Landess Kelso, and commissioned on 17 December 1988, with Captain Dennis Witzenburg in command of the Blue Crew and Captain Kenneth D. Barker in command of the Gold Crew.

The Tennessee was the first Ohio-class submarine commissioned capable of launching the Trident II ballistic missile (D5). On 21 March 1989, off the coast of Cape Canaveral, Florida, the Tennessee attempted the first submerged launch of the D5 which failed four seconds into the flight. Once the problem was understood, relatively simple changes were made and the first successful submerged test launch of a D5 missile was completed on 2 August 1989 by the Tennessee's Gold Crew.

== Service History ==
In 2021, Tennessee entered drydock to undergo a major overhaul at TRF Kings Bay, one that the facility says is the longest and most extensive work package it has executed in its history.

In December 2022, Tennessee conducted a training exercise in the Atlantic with HMS Victorious (S29).

Commander of the United States European Command, General Christopher G. Cavoli, embarked the Tennessee in July 2023 alongside William J. Houston who, at the time, held the position of Commander, Submarine Force Atlantic. They were given a formal tour by the crew.

In July 2023, Tennessee made a scheduled port visit to HMNB Clyde in Scotland. Simultaneously, the USS Kentucky (SSBN-737) pulled into the Busan Naval Base in South Korea. This was allegedly conducted as a show of force and to show the capabilities of the U.S. SSBN Fleet. The following year, July 2024, the Tennessee made yet another port call to HMNB Clyde. Prior to this, it had conducted operations in the Norwegian Sea alongside the USS Normandy (CG-60), where it was reported that the Norwegian Flag Commodore Trond Gimmingsrud embarked Tennessee for a demonstration of SSBN operations. During its transits into HMNB Clyde, HMS Northumberland (F238) was seen escorting the Submarine.

Tennessee was awarded the Battle Effectiveness Award in 2023. Tennessee additionally won a second "Battle E" award in 2024.

On 22 November 2024, Miss America 2024 Madison Marsh and Georgia Congressman Buddy Carter toured Tennessee in Kings Bay, Georgia as the boat was undergoing refit. They were given a formal tour by the crew. They additionally toured the Kings Bay Naval Base.

Following its 2023 and 2024 back to back "Battle E" awards, the Tennessee was among the various units chosen to receive the 2024 Omaha Trophy, representing the Submarine side of Strategic Deterrence for the 2024 fiscal year.

Near the beginning of 2025, Tennessee once again entered drydock. Tennessee departed drydock in May 2025 after an extended maintenance period. The work included the installation of a new conformal sonar array under the Acoustic Superiority Program.

== In popular culture ==
- In Tom Clancy's 1994 novel Debt of Honor, Tennessee is one of several submarines sent to deal with a Japanese invasion of the Northern Mariana Islands. She is used as a "slow-attack" submarine, relying on her stealthiness and her torpedo tubes in combating Japanese forces. Tennessee is also used as a refueling point for a group of attack helicopters.
