= USS Wyoming (SSBN-742) =

Submarine of the United States

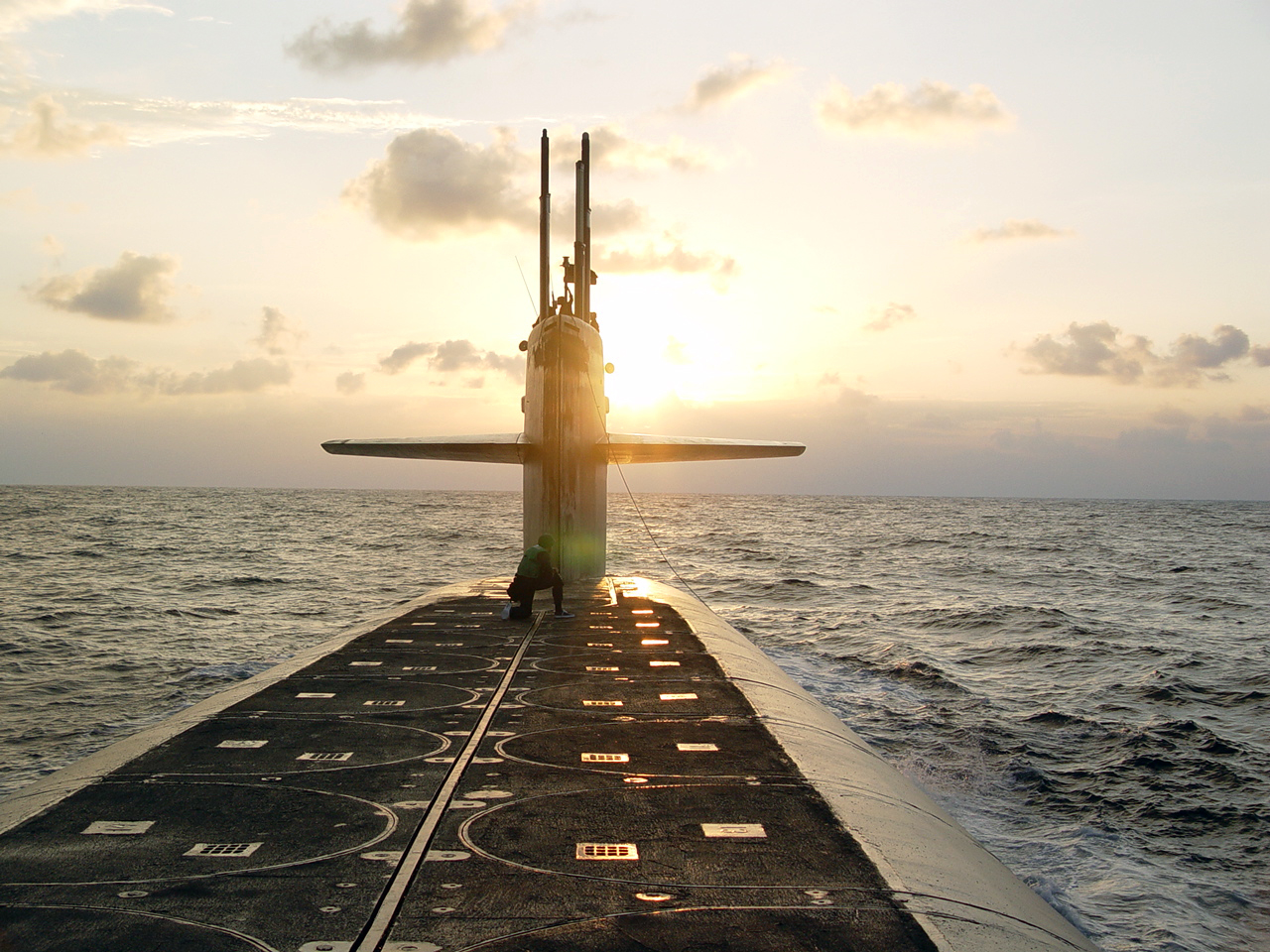
- USS Wyoming (SSBN-742) approaches Naval Submarine Base Kings Bay on 9 January 2009.

History

United States
- Name: USS Wyoming
- Namesake: State of Wyoming
- Ordered: 18 October 1989
- Builder: General Dynamics Electric Boat, Groton, Connecticut
- Laid down: 8 August 1991
- Launched: 15 July 1995
- Commissioned: 13 July 1996
- Home port: Naval Base Kitsap, Washington
- Motto: Cedant Arma Togae; ("Force must yield to law")
- Status: in active service
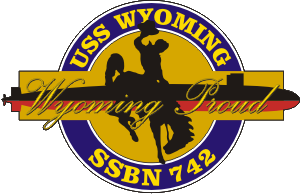
- Badge

General characteristics
- Class & type: Ohio-class ballistic missile submarine
- Displacement: 16,764 long tons (17,033 t) surfaced; 18,750 long tons (19,050 t) submerged
- Length: 560 ft (170 m)
- Beam: 42 ft (13 m)
- Draft: 38 ft (12 m)
- Propulsion: 1 × S8G PWR nuclear reactor (HEU 93.5%); 2 × geared turbines; 1 × 325 hp (242 kW) auxiliary motor; 1 × shaft @ 60,000 shp (45,000 kW)
- Speed: Greater than 25 knots (46 km/h; 29 mph)
- Test depth: Greater than 800 feet (240 m)
- Complement: 15 officers; 140 enlisted
- Armament: MK-48 torpedoes; 20 × Trident II D-5 ballistic missiles

USS Wyoming (hull number SSBN-742) is a United States Navy Ohio-class ballistic missile submarine which has been in commission since 1996. She is the fourth US Navy ship to be named USS Wyoming, although it was only the third named after the state of Wyoming. (Note: The first Wyoming, USS Wyoming (1859), was named in honor of the Wyoming Valley in eastern Pennsylvania, nine years before the creation of the Wyoming Territory, which later became the state.)

The contract to build Wyoming was awarded to the Electric Boat Division of the General Dynamics Corporation in Groton, Connecticut, on 18 October 1989 and her keel was laid down there on 8 August 1991. She was launched on 15 July 1995, sponsored by Mrs. Monika B. Owens, and commissioned on 13 July 1996.

== Service history ==
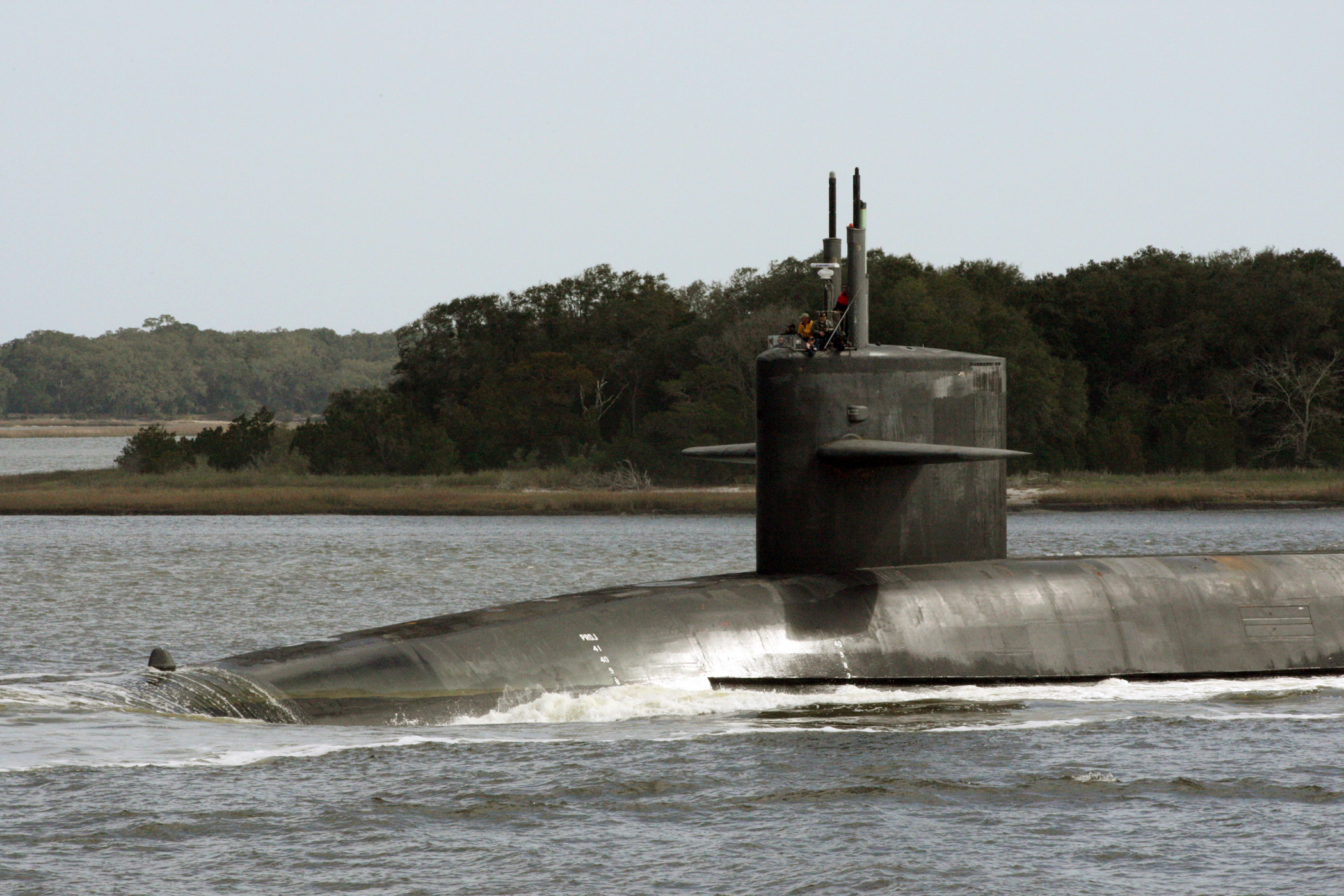
Wyoming transits the Intracoastal Waterway; 11 February 2009

=== 1990s ===
On 26 July 1996, Wyoming arrived at Kings Bay Naval Submarine Base, Georgia, becoming the ninth submarine to be home-ported there.

=== 2010s ===
On 6 June 2012, Wyoming participated in a historic medevac exercise with a Bell Boeing V-22 Osprey making a 12,000 nautical mile flight to collect a stretcher from the submarine.

On 7 January 2018, she arrived at Norfolk Naval Shipyard to begin a 27-month overhaul to include midlife refueling, technological upgrades, and new berthing spaces for enlisted women.

==== Shower video scandal ====
In 2011, Wyoming became one of the first four submarines to take on female officers. During patrols from August to November 2013 and March to June 2014, four women were secretly recorded in the shower changing room, including midshipmen and officers assigned to the boat. Up to twelve male sailors, all petty officers, were implicated, though it is believed that only one of them made the recordings with a smartphone, and then shared them. Of the twelve sailors that were investigated, ten were prosecuted and convicted, with sentences ranging from prison time to reductions in pay.

=== 2020s ===
USS Wyoming test firing Trident II UGM-133A missile, September 2021

On 9 October 2020, she completed her 27-month overhaul and returned to Kings Bay, GA.

On 17 September 2021, Wyoming conducted a successful, two-missile test flight of unarmed life-extended Trident II (D5LE) missiles on the Eastern Test Range off the coast of Cape Canaveral, Florida.

Wyoming conducted an exchange of command at sea in January 2022. "This regularly scheduled exchange of command at sea demonstrates the continuity and operational flexibility of our sea-based nuclear deterrence operations and our ready, reliable ballistic-submarine force," said a Navy spokesperson.

On 24 March 2022 Wyoming became the first ballistic submarine in US Navy history to complete a deterrent patrol with enlisted females as part of the crew. In October 2026, Wyoming shifted its homeport to Naval Base Kitsap in Washington.
