= Naval Submarine Base Kings Bay =

US Navy base in Georgia

- Near St. Marys, Georgia in the United States
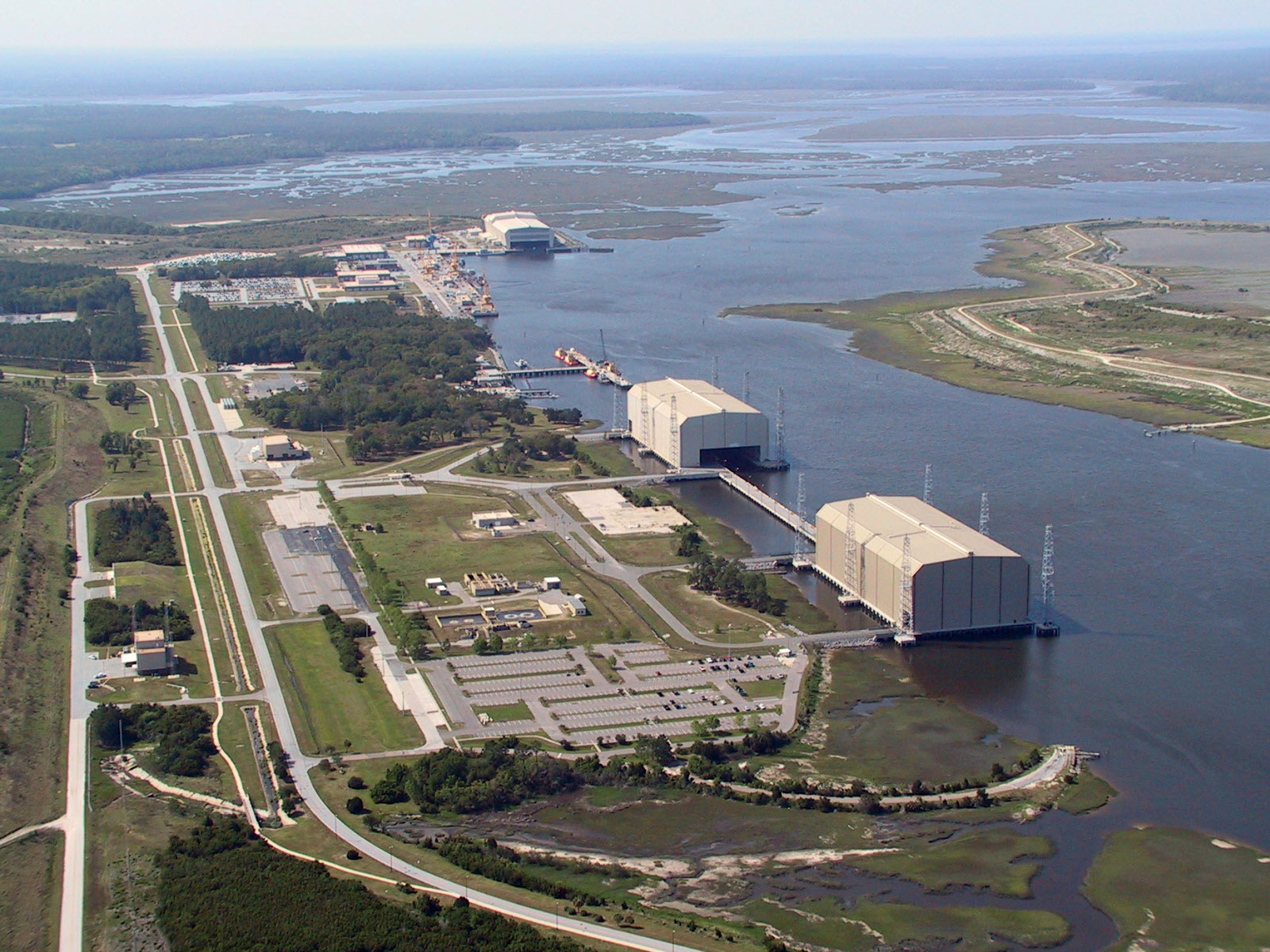
- An aerial view of Naval Submarine Base Kings Bay during April 2001

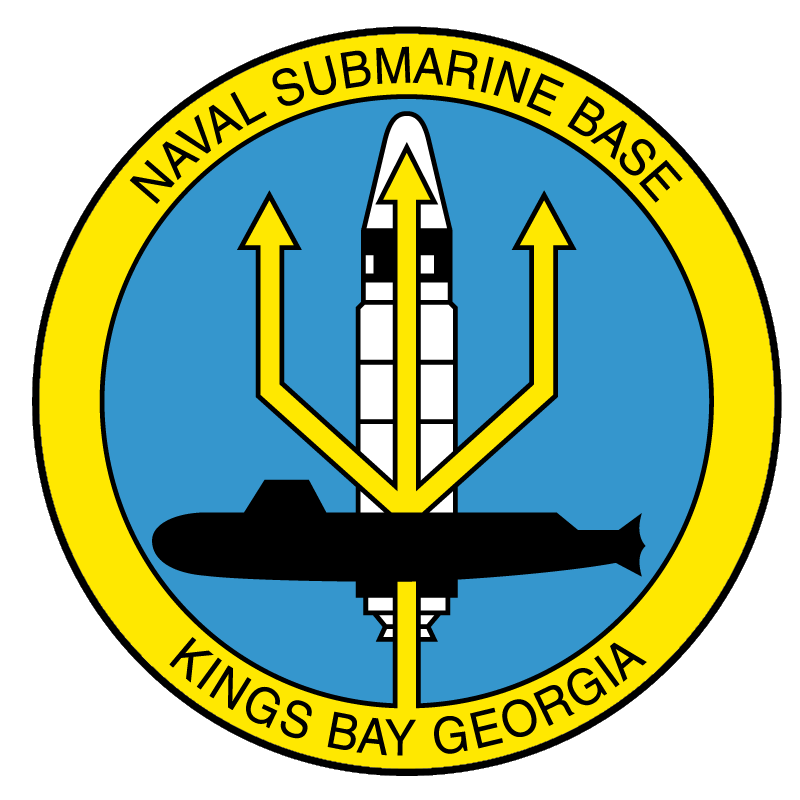

Site information
- Type: Naval base
- Owner: Department of Defense
- Operator: US Navy
- Controlled by: Navy Region Southeast
- Condition: Operational
- Website: Official website

Location
- Location within Georgia Location within the United States
- Coordinates: 30°46.9′N 81°32.1′W
- Area: 16,000 acres (6,500 hectares)

Site history
- Built: 1978–1989
- In use: 1978 – present

Garrison information
- Current commander: Captain William M. Dull
- Garrison: Submarine Group 10
- Occupants: Submarine Squadron 16; Submarine Squadron 20; Strategic Weapons Facility Atlantic

Naval Submarine Base Kings Bay is a base of the United States Navy located adjacent to the city of St. Marys in Camden County, Georgia, on the East River in southeastern Georgia, and 38 miles (61 km) from Jacksonville, Florida. The Submarine Base is the U.S. Atlantic Fleet's home port for U.S. Navy Fleet ballistic missile nuclear submarines capable of being armed with Trident missile nuclear weapons. This submarine base covers about 16,000 acres (6,500 hectares) of land, of which 4,000 acres (1,600 hectares) are protected wetlands.

== History ==
=== The early years ===
Archaeological research has revealed a pre-Columbian era Indian presence throughout the area, dating back thousands of years.

Early in the 19th century, much of what is now the submarine base was the site of several plantations, including Cherry Point, Harmony Hall, New Canaan, Marianna and Kings Bay. Beginning in the 1790s, Thomas King built a plantation along the bay. John Houston McIntosh built a considerably larger plantation known as New Canaan, where he grew cotton and sugar cane.

The plantation system declined following the Civil War, and the land was broken up into smaller holdings. One land owner was paid four thousand dollars for 62 acres (25 ha) of deep water land. Such residents harvested shrimp, fish and other seafood, and trapped and hunted to supplement small-scale farming of corn, sugar and other vegetables.

=== The Army years ===
The US Army began to acquire 7,000 acres (28.33 km^{2}; 10.94 sq mi) of land at Kings Bay in 1954 to build a military ocean terminal to ship ammunition in case of a national emergency. Construction began in 1955 and was completed in 1958. A 200-foot-wide channel was dredged to Cumberland Sound, and included two turning basins.

The most prominent feature of the terminal was its 2,000-foot-long (610 m), 87-foot-wide (27 m) concrete-and-steel wharf (600 m × 26 m). It had three parallel railroad tracks, enabling the simultaneous loading of several ammunition ships from rail cars and trucks.

Elsewhere on the base, the Army laid 47 miles (76 km) of railroad tracks. Spurs off the main line ran into temporary storage areas protected by earthen barricades. These mounds of dirt, still prominent features in many areas of the base, were designed to localize damage in case of explosive accidents.

It was soon realized that there was no immediate operational need for the installation, so it was placed in an inactive ready status, and Blue Star Shipping Company signed a lease to use the wharf in 1959.

Although the army post was never activated to serve its primary purpose, it was used twice for other missions. In 1964, as Hurricane Dora hammered the area, nearly 100 area residents were sheltered aboard base. Also, during the Cuban Missile Crisis, an Army Transportation Battalion of 1,100 personnel and 70 small boats took up position at Kings Bay.

=== The Navy years ===
The chain of events that led to submarine operations at Kings Bay began in 1975. At that time, treaty negotiations between Spain and the United States were in progress. A proposed change to the United States naval basing agreement with Spain included the withdrawal of the fleet ballistic-missile submarine squadron, Submarine Squadron 16, from its operational base at Rota, Spain, northwest of Gibraltar, giving easy access to Atlantic Ocean patrol areas. Anticipating that this would take place, Chief of Naval Operations James L. Holloway III ordered studies to select a new refit site on the East Coast of the United States.

In January 1976, the negotiators initialed a draft treaty between Spain and the United States. It called for withdrawal of the submarine squadron from Rota by July 1979. The U.S. Senate ratified the treaty in June 1976.

After review, Kings Bay was selected in November 1976, shortly after the election of Georgian Jimmy Carter as President. Soon afterward, the first Navy personnel arrived in the Kings Bay area and started preparations for the transfer of property from the Army to the Navy. Naval Submarine Support Base Kings Bay was established in a developmental status 1 July 1978. The base—now Naval Submarine Base Kings Bay—occupies not only the former Army terminal land, but several thousand additional acres.

Preparations for the arrival of the submarine squadron went forward throughout the remainder of 1978 and into 1979. Commander Submarine Squadron 16 greeted the submarine tender Simon Lake, when it arrived at Kings Bay on 2 July 1979. Four days later, USS James Monroe entered Kings Bay and moored alongside Simon Lake's starboard side to begin a routine refit in preparation for another nuclear weapons deterrence patrol. Kings Bay has been an operating submarine base ever since that time.

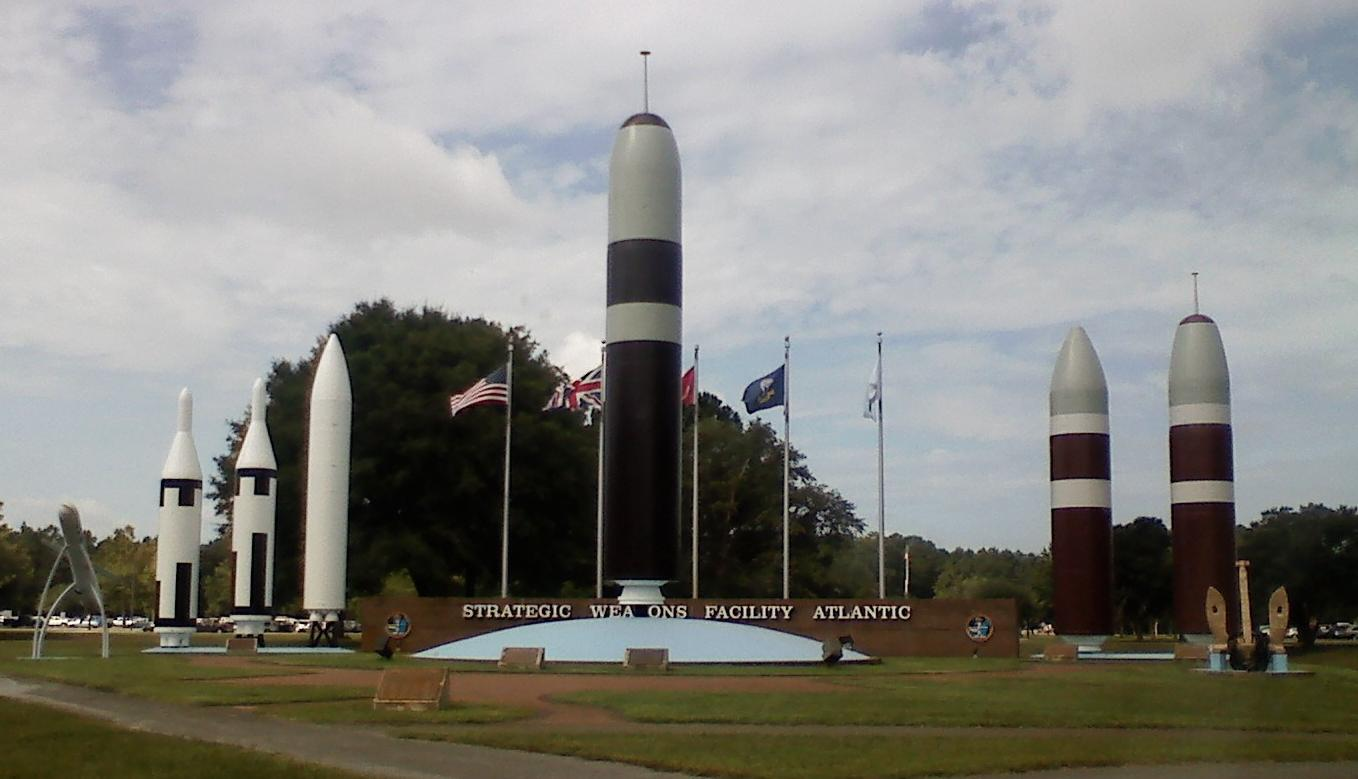
Display of submarine-launched missiles on board the base, including the Polaris, Poseidon, and Trident.

In May 1979, the U.S. Navy selected Kings Bay as its preferred East Coast site for the new Ohio-class Trident submarines. On 23 October 1980, after a one-year environmental impact study was completed, and with Congressional approval, the Secretary of the Navy announced that Kings Bay would be the future home port for the new Trident-missile submarines in the Atlantic Ocean.

The decision to base the Trident submarines at Kings Bay started what the Navy and outside defense analysts have described as the largest peacetime construction program ever undertaken by the U.S. Navy. By the end of the 1980s the Navy had spent more than $1.7 billion on military construction at the base. The building project included the construction of three major commands: Trident Training Facility (TTF), Trident Refit Facility (TRF), and Strategic Weapons Facility, Atlantic (SWFLANT).

On 15 January 1989, the first Trident submarine, Tennessee, arrived at Kings Bay. She was followed by Pennsylvania later that same year. West Virginia was commissioned at Kings Bay in October 1990, and she was followed by Kentucky in July 1991; Maryland in June 1992; Nebraska in July 1993; Rhode Island in July 1994; Maine in July 1995, and Wyoming in July 1996. The commissioning of Louisiana in September 1997 gave Kings Bay its maximum number of ten Trident submarines.

In late March 1990, the Trident II (D-5) missile made its first deterrent patrol on board the USS Tennessee.

==== Post Cold-War Era ====
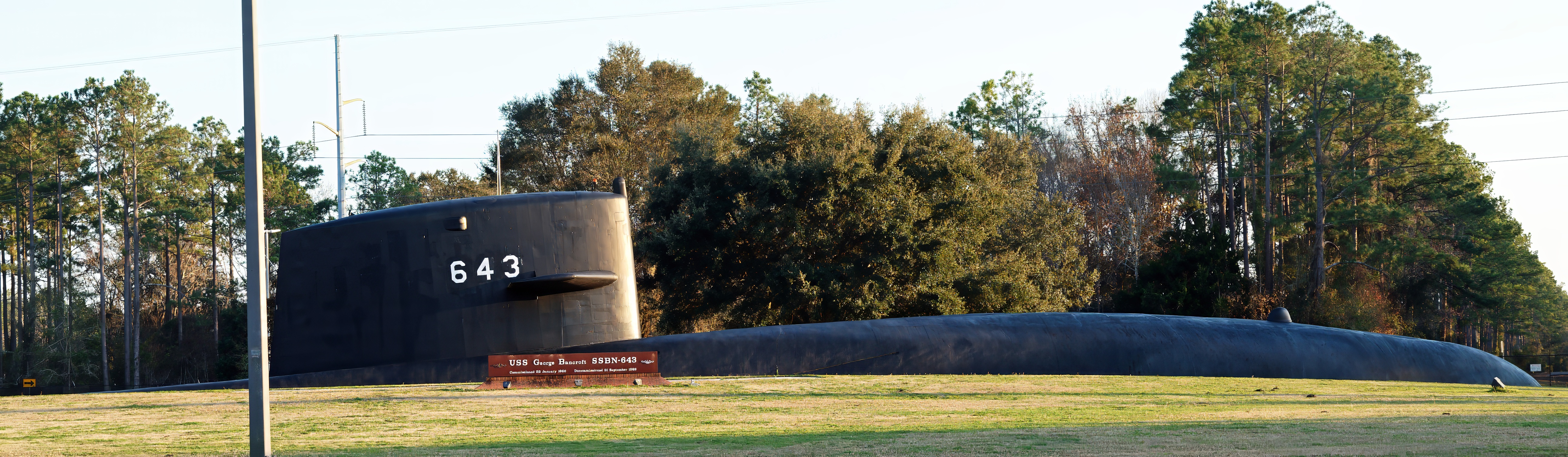
Sail of USS George Bancroft on display at main gate, dedicated 7 April 2000, as part of Kings Bay's celebration of the submarine forces' 100th anniversary.

The end of the Cold War and the reorganization of Naval and Air Force strategic weapons forces during the 1990s had a significant effect on the submarine base at Kings Bay. A high-level nuclear weapons policy review recommended that the U.S. Navy reduce its number of Trident Fleet Ballistic Missile submarines from 18 to 14 by 2005.

The decision was made to temporarily decommission the four oldest Ohio-class Trident missile submarines for extensive shipyard work in order to convert them into guided-missile submarines (SSGNs) carrying large numbers (about 150) of conventionally armed Tomahawk cruise missiles. These converted submarines also have accommodations for significant numbers of Navy SEALs or Marines.

Furthermore, several Trident submarines were transferred from the Atlantic Fleet to the Pacific Fleet. USS Pennsylvania departed on 4 August 2003 and USS Kentucky departed on 24 August 2003, bound for the Trident submarine base at Bangor, Washington, as part of balancing the Trident fleet. In addition, both USS Louisiana and USS Maine were transferred to the Pacific Fleet in 2005.

USS Florida and USS Georgia completed their conversions into guided missile submarines in 2006 and 2008, respectively, and now have their home port at the Kings Bay Submarine Base.

==== Anti-War Protest ====
On April 4, 2018, seven anti-war activists entered the naval base, cutting a lock and part of a perimeter fence, hammered on a public display of missile replicas, poured their own blood at several locations on the grounds, and spray-painted anti-war and anti-nuclear slogans on facility walls. The activists, calling themselves the Kings Bay Plowshares 7, were found guilty of three felonies and one misdemeanor. Between June 2020 and April 2021, the seven were sentenced to terms ranging from time served to 33 months in federal prison, along with restitution and supervised probation; all had completed their prison terms by 2022.

== Major Commands at Kings Bay ==
=== Submarine Group 10 ===
Submarine Group 10 was commissioned January 1, 1989, and is the senior command at Kings Bay. Group 10 is a subordinate command to Commander Submarine Force U.S. Atlantic Fleet. It exercises command over various commands and units assigned, including operational and administrative control of the Ohio-class submarines based at Submarine Base Kings Bay.

Group 10 is the local coordinating authority for all matters assigned by the submarine force commander and exercises direct control over the administration and training of submarine offcrews at Kings Bay. Specifically included in these responsibilities are the proper integration and coordination of the facilities dedicated to training support of the Trident system.

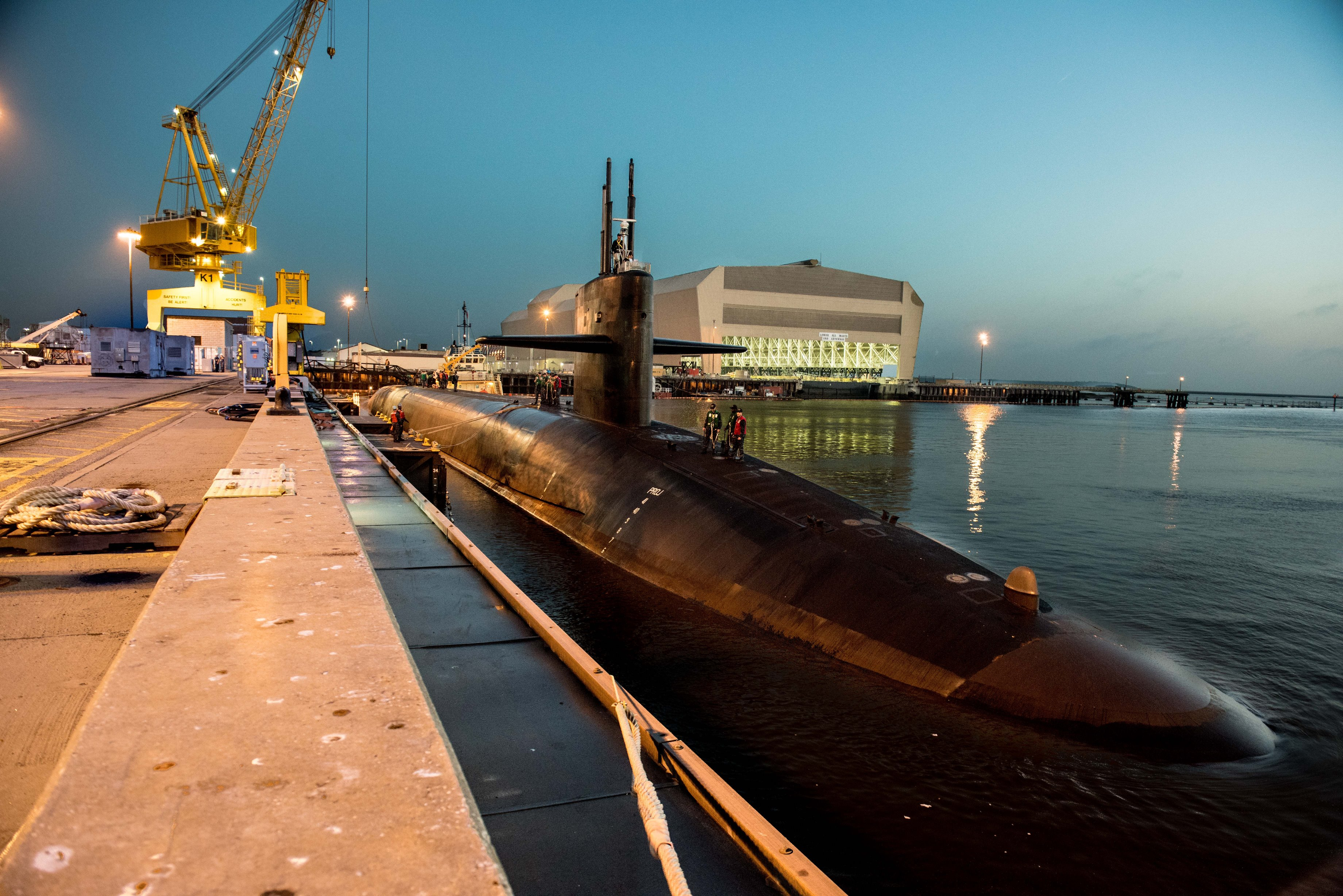
USS Maryland (SSBN-738), an Ohio-class ballistic-missile submarine berthed at Kings Bay during 2016

=== Submarine Squadron 16 ===
As of 2009, Submarine Squadron 16 provided administrative support for the East Coast-based Ohio-class SSGN submarines. The squadron coordinates planning and executing all SSGN maintenance with Trident Refit Facility and is responsible for all material readiness and fiscal responsibility. The SSGN fleet relies heavily on this maintenance. In addition Submarine Squadron 16 will provide support for SSBNs during and after major overhaul periods.

=== Submarine Squadron 20 ===
Submarine Squadron 20 provides the same kind of support services as Submarine Squadron 16, except that it is responsible for the East Coast-based Ohio-class SSBN and the strategic deterrence missions those SSBNs undertake.

=== Naval Submarine Support Center ===
The Naval Submarine Support Center (NSSC) provides centralized administrative and support services to the submarines and staffs of Submarine Squadron 16 and Submarine Squadron 20, as well as to other visiting and assigned units, assisting with material, management, personnel, and waterfront operations in the Kings Bay area.

=== Strategic Weapons Facility Atlantic ===
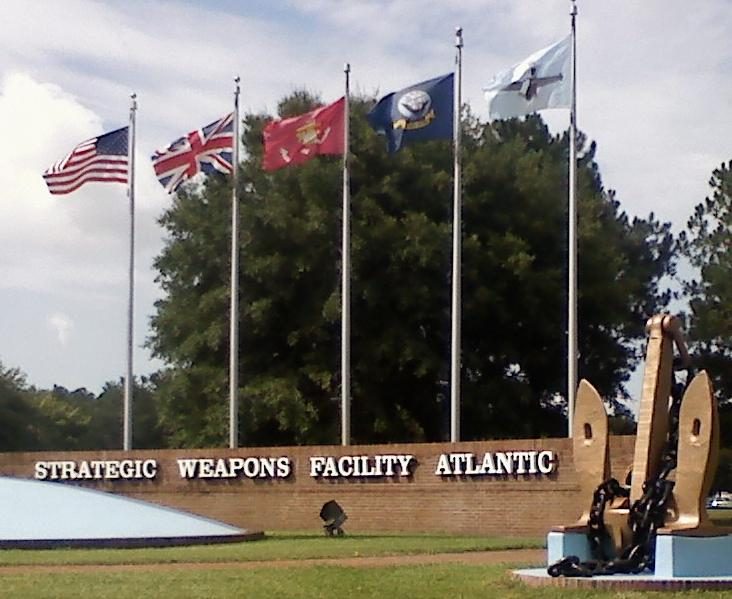
Flag display at Strategic Weapons Facility Atlantic (SWFLANT)

Strategic Weapons Facility Atlantic (SWFLANT) provides strategic missiles and strategic weapons system support to the ballistic missile submarine fleet, as well as support for the converted guided-missile submarines that carry the Tomahawk cruise missile. The command is responsible for assembling the D-5 missile and processing missile guidance and launcher subsystem components, with components shipped to Kings Bay from more than 1,800 suppliers and subcontractors nationwide. Construction of the SWFLANT complex's 24 buildings began in 1985 and was completed in 1994; the 800-acre (320 ha) complex includes two explosive handling wharves, the taller of which rises 144 feet (44 m) and is the tallest building in Camden County.

=== Marine Corps Security Force Battalion ===
Marine Corps Security Force Battalion, Kings Bay conducts security operations in Direct Support (DS) of SWFLANT, securing strategic assets within SWFLANT's area of responsibility to prevent unauthorized access or loss of control, and is prepared to conduct recapture or recovery operations to regain control of compromised strategic assets. The battalion is commanded by a senior Marine Corps officer. A similar sister battalion is stationed with the west coast submarine base in Bangor, Washington. In addition to Marine Corps security forces, they are joined by Navy Master-at-Arms and Navy Law Enforcement/Security Officers with the 6490 designator. Both Masters-at-Arms and Navy Law Enforcement/Security Officers are part of the larger U.S. Navy Security Forces.

=== United States Coast Guard (USCG) Maritime Force Protection Unit ===
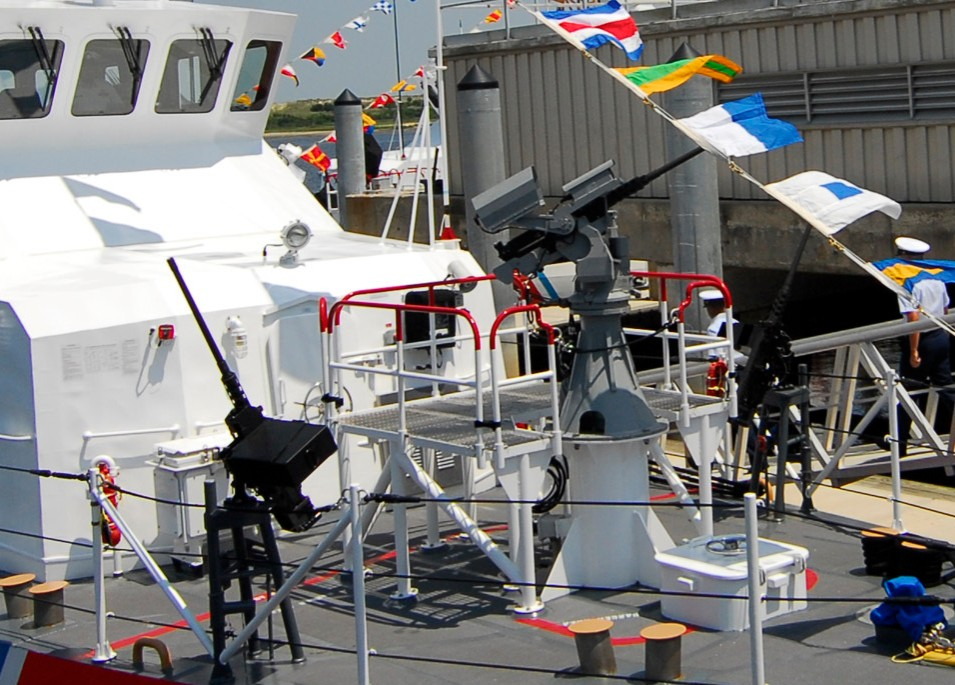
Foredeck of the newly commissioned USCGC Sea Dog, showing all three machine guns.

One of the first Maritime Force Protection Units was established by the United States Coast Guard (USCG) at Kings Bay. The Maritime Force Protection Unit provides escort protection for the submarines as they transit on the surface, to and from their homeports. The unit includes some smaller vessels, and two Marine Protector class cutters, the USCGC Sea Dragon and the USCGC Sea Dog. The Sea Dragon and Sea Dog, and two other cutters, the USCGC Sea Devil and USCGC Sea Fox, although crewed by sailors from the Coast Guard, were ordered (and paid for) by the Navy. For protecting submarines the Navy requested a slightly modified design, which added gyrostabilized machine gun, with advanced optics, which was fired under remote control from the ship's bridge. The gyrostabilized gun's greater long-range accuracy made it more appropriate for intercepting speedboats laden with a suicide bomb.

=== Trident Refit Facility ===
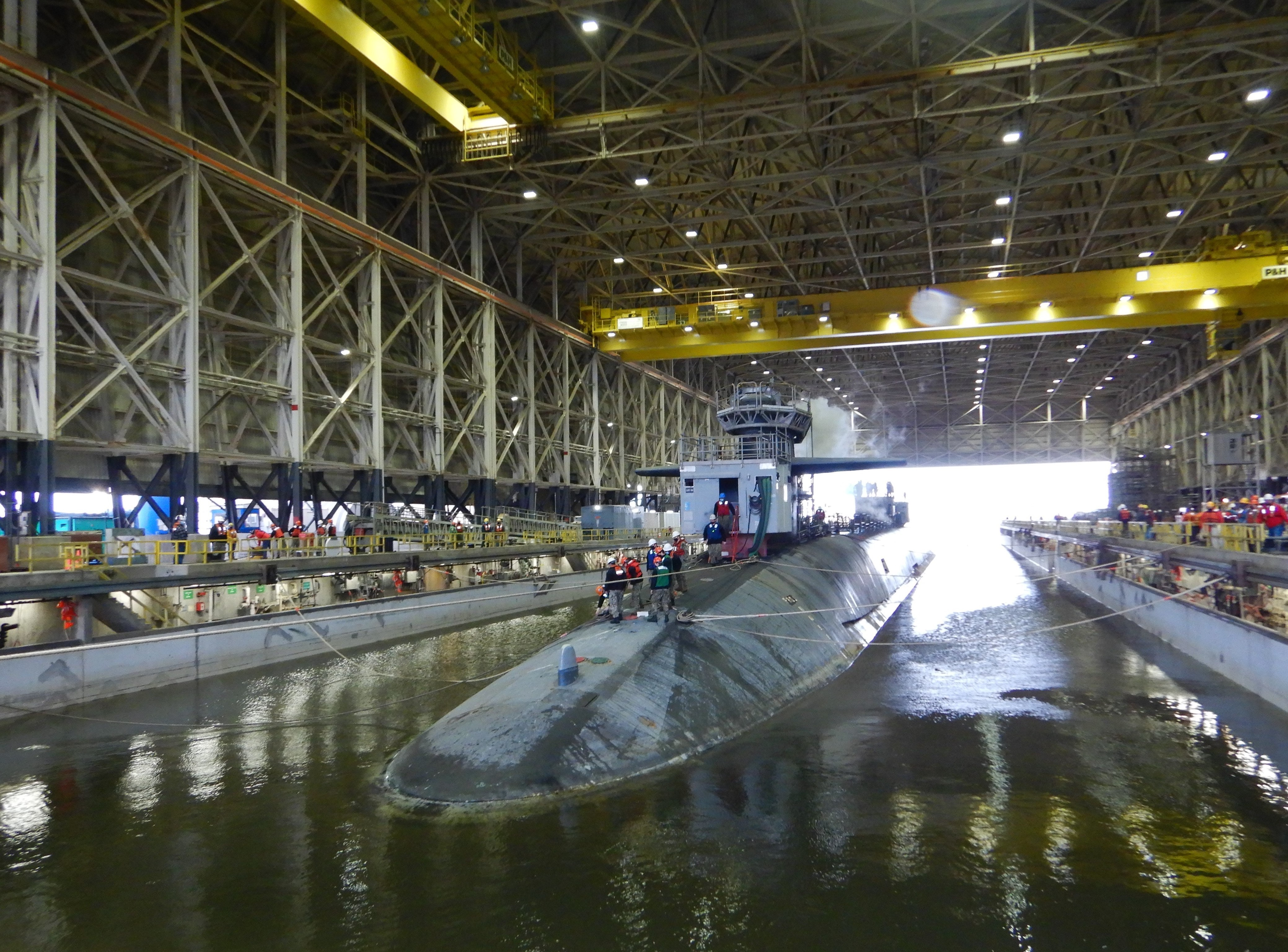
The USS Tennessee (SSBN-734) enters drydock at Trident Refit Facility in 2021

The Trident Refit Facility (TRF) is the largest tenant command at Kings Bay and has kept a significant portion of the United States Fleet Ballistic Missile submarines at sea since 1985. TRF provides quality industrial-level and logistics support for the incremental overhaul, modernization, and repair of Trident submarines. It also furnishes global submarine supplies and spare parts support. In addition, TRF provides maintenance and support services to other submarines, regional maintenance customers, and other activities as requested.

According to the Navy, the Trident Refit Facility possesses the largest covered drydock in the Northern Hemisphere, measuring 700 feet (210 m) long, 100 feet (30 m) wide, and 67 feet (20 m) deep. A state-of-the-art Magnetic Silencing Facility (MSF) provides degaussing services, including ranging and the removal of permanent magnetism for submarines of the U.S. Navy and the British Royal Navy, as well as for steel-hulled surface warships. The MSF is the only facility of its kind on the East Coast, and it is also used for research and development of future magnetic systems. The Defensive Ordnance Support Facility maintains and stores all of the torpedoes carried by the Trident missile submarines for self-defense.

=== Trident Training Facility ===
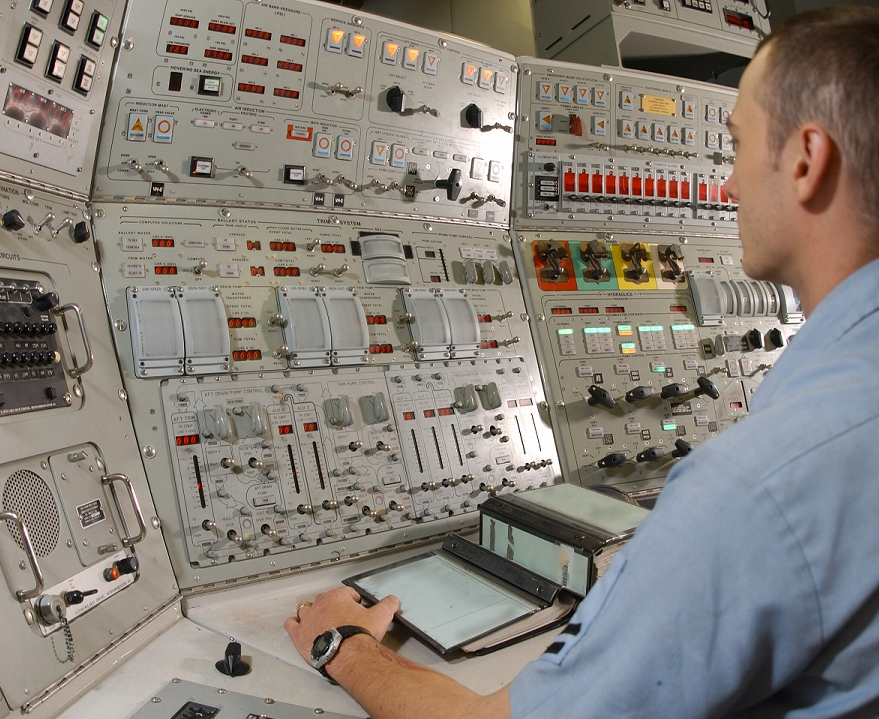
Sailors use a simulator for refresher training at Kings Bay's Trident Training Facility (TTF)

The Trident Training Facility (TTF), with over 520,000 square feet (48,000 square metres) of classroom and office space, trains sailors in the skills necessary to operate and maintain the Trident submarine and its systems. TTF has an essential role in support of the Trident submarines and uses equipment trainers (simulators) to simulate, as realistically as possible, the actual equipment on the submarine. Trainers include damage control, fire fighting, ship control, navigation, and most weapons and engineering subsystems.

TTF's mission is to provide basic, advanced, functional, refresher and team training to Trident submarine crew members and submarine support personnel, in order to increase and maintain the knowledge and proficiency in specific skills and to provide specialized training. The United Kingdom's Vanguard-class submarines, through the Polaris Sales Agreement, also uses the Trident missile and their sailors sometimes visit the Kings Bay Naval Base. Additionally, the Colombian Navy trained at TTF because of the lack of high technology trainers in their own country.

== Homeported submarines ==
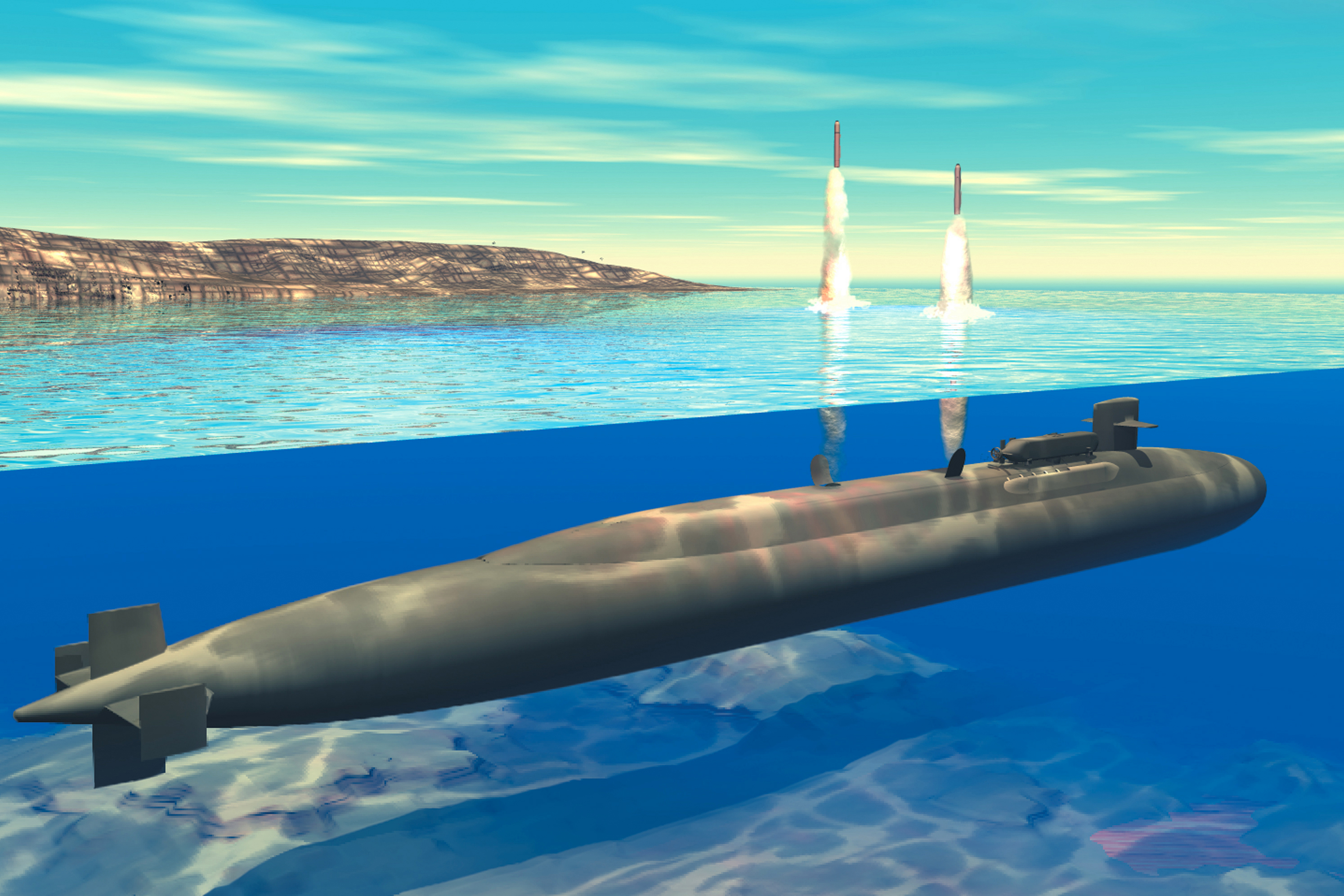
Artist's concept of an Ohio-class SSGN launching Tomahawk Cruise Missiles.

- Commander, Submarine Squadron 16 (CSS 16):
  - Ohio-class submarines:
    - USS Florida (SSGN-728)
    - USS Georgia (SSGN-729)
  - Columbia-class submarines:
    - Pre-Commissioning Unit (PCU) USS District of Columbia (SSBN-826)
- Commander, Submarine Squadron 20 (CSS 20):
  - Ohio-class submarines:
    - USS Alaska (SSBN-732)
    - USS Tennessee (SSBN-734)
    - USS Pennsylvania (SSBN-735)
    - USS West Virginia (SSBN-736)
    - USS Maryland (SSBN-738)
    - USS Rhode Island (SSBN-740)

== Gallery ==
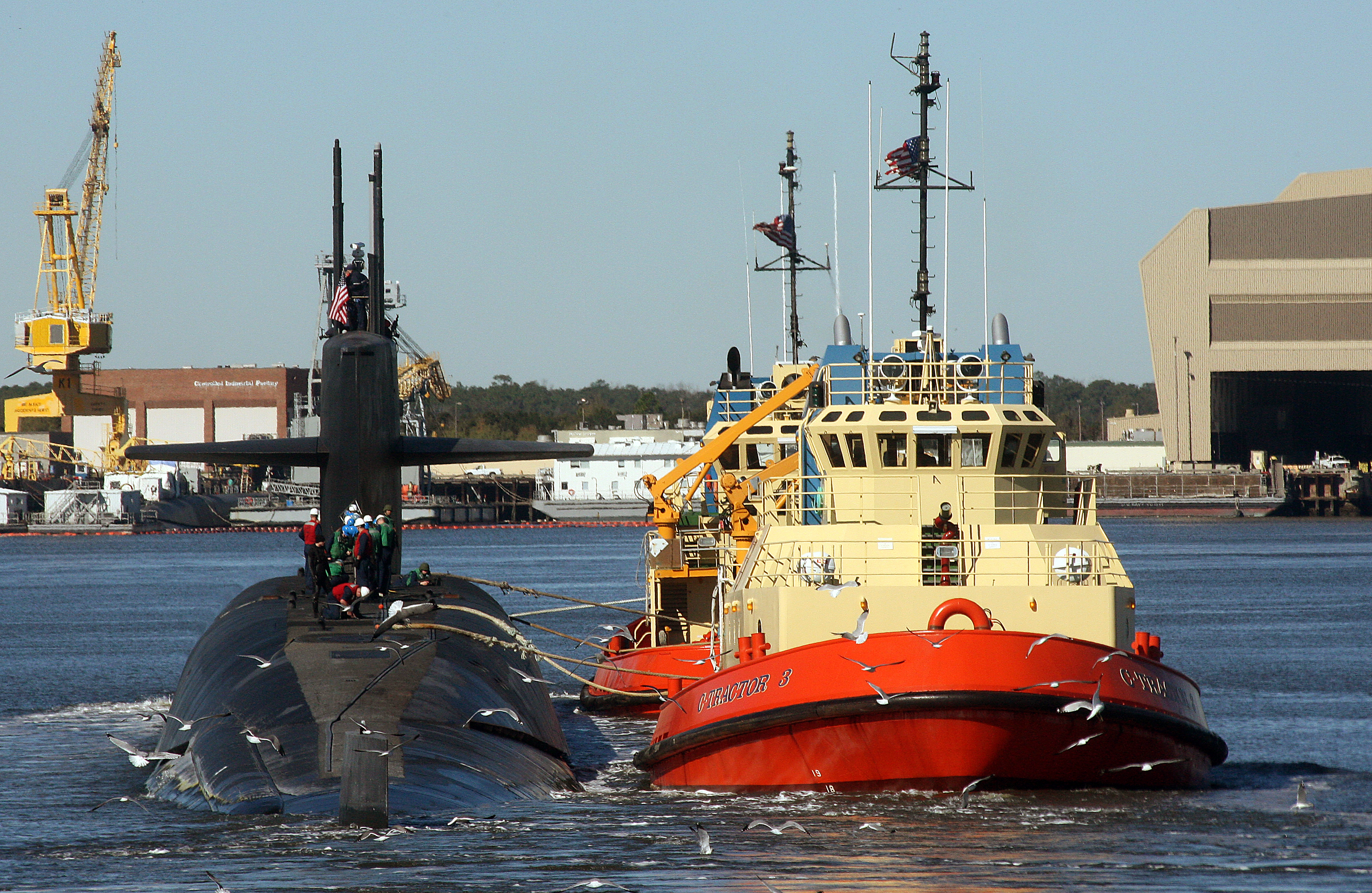
USS Rhode Island (SSBN-740) being escorted by tug boats to Kings Bay.

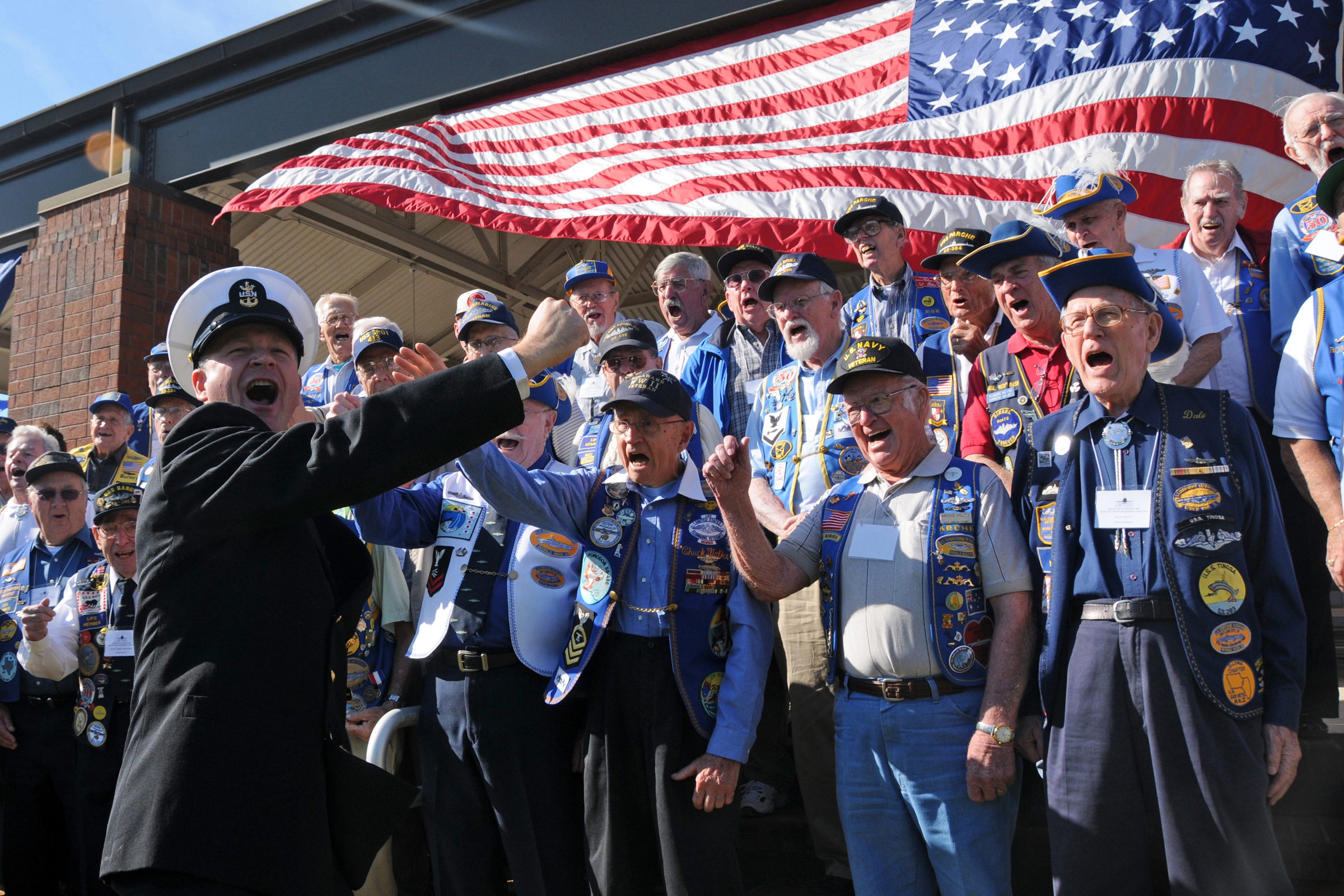
Former Master Chief Petty Officer of the Navy Rick West visits World War II submarine veterans at Kings Bay.

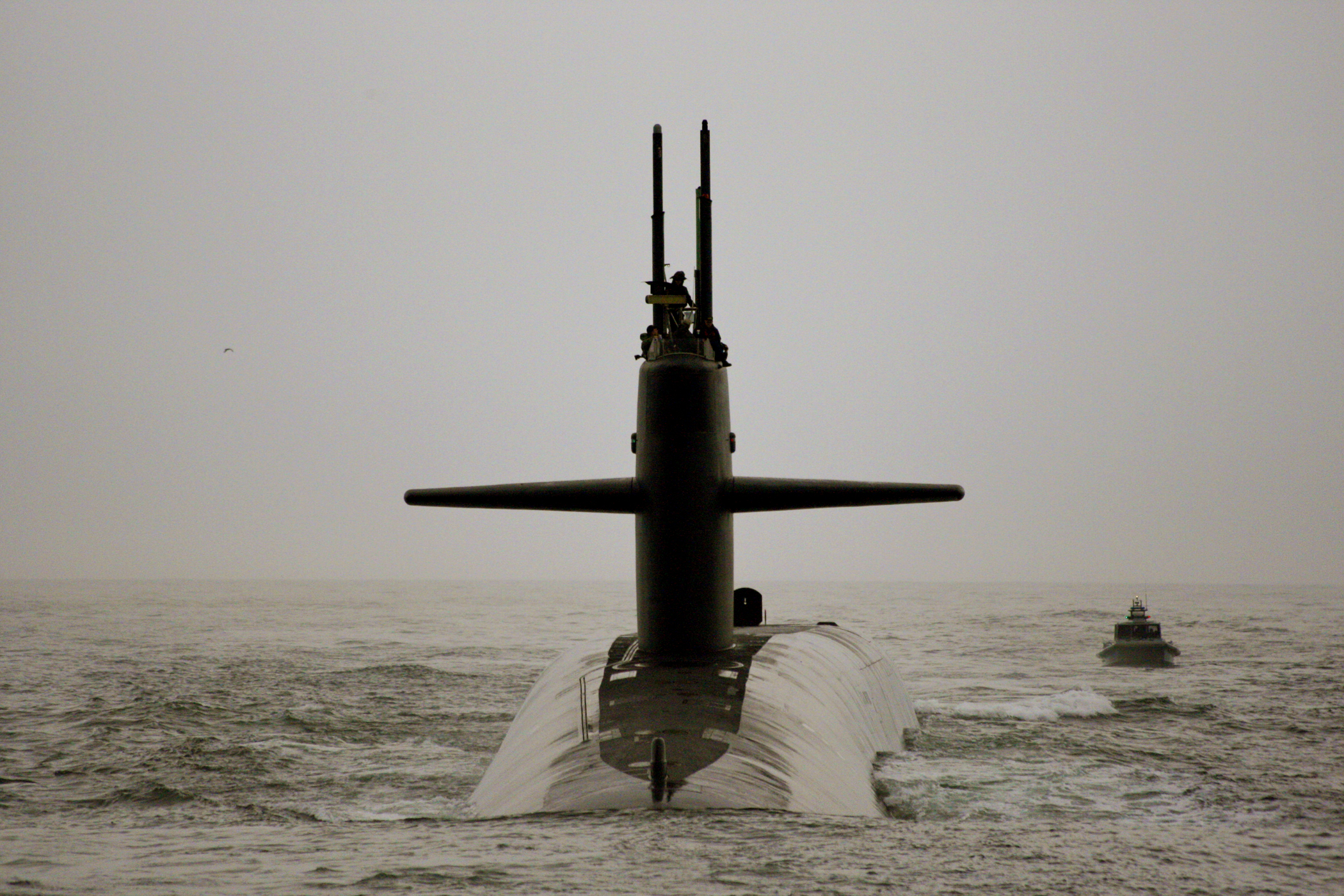
USS Alaska (SSBN-732) arrives at Kings Bay.

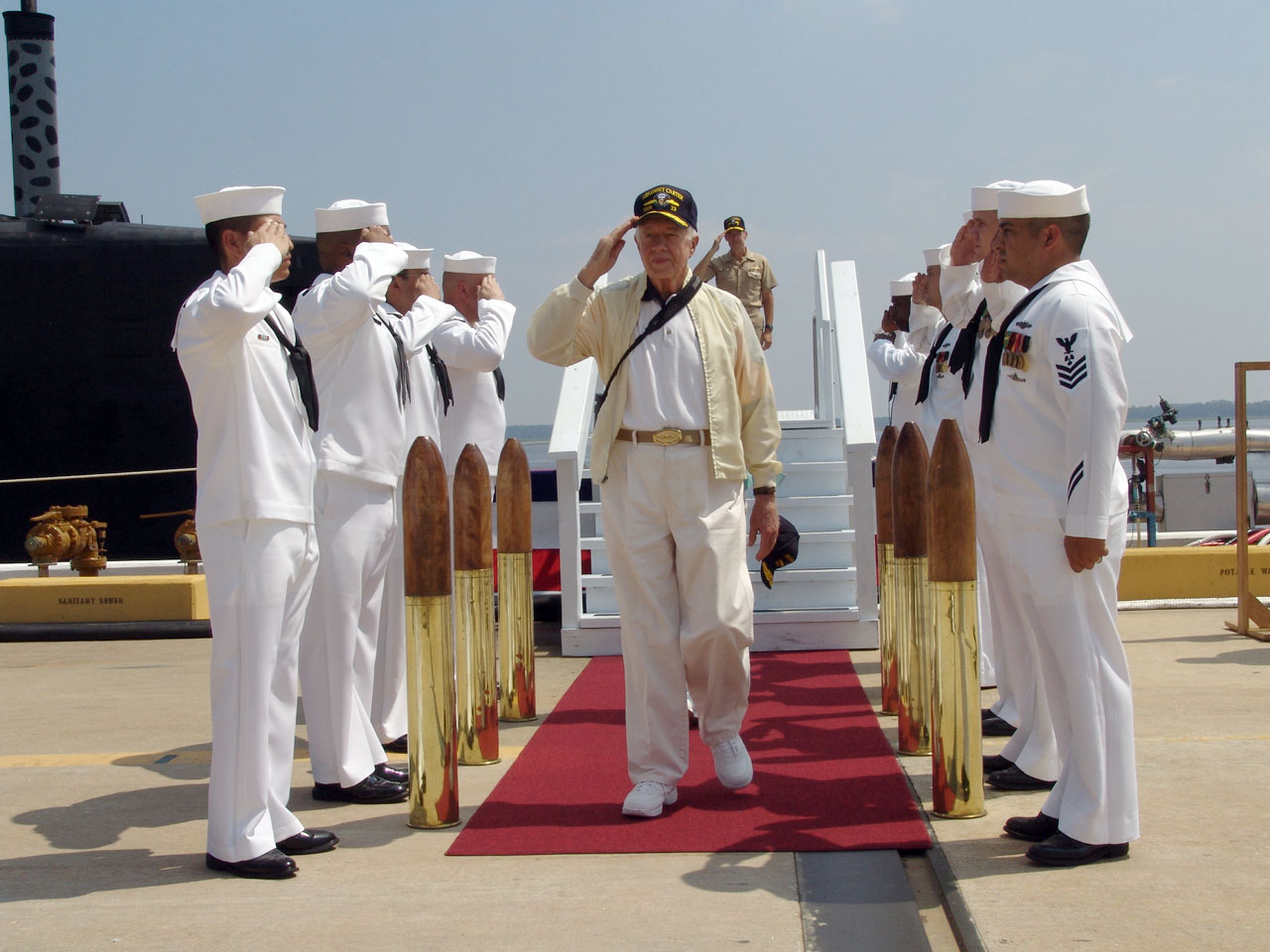
President Jimmy Carter salutes the sideboys after departing the USS Jimmy Carter (SSN-23)

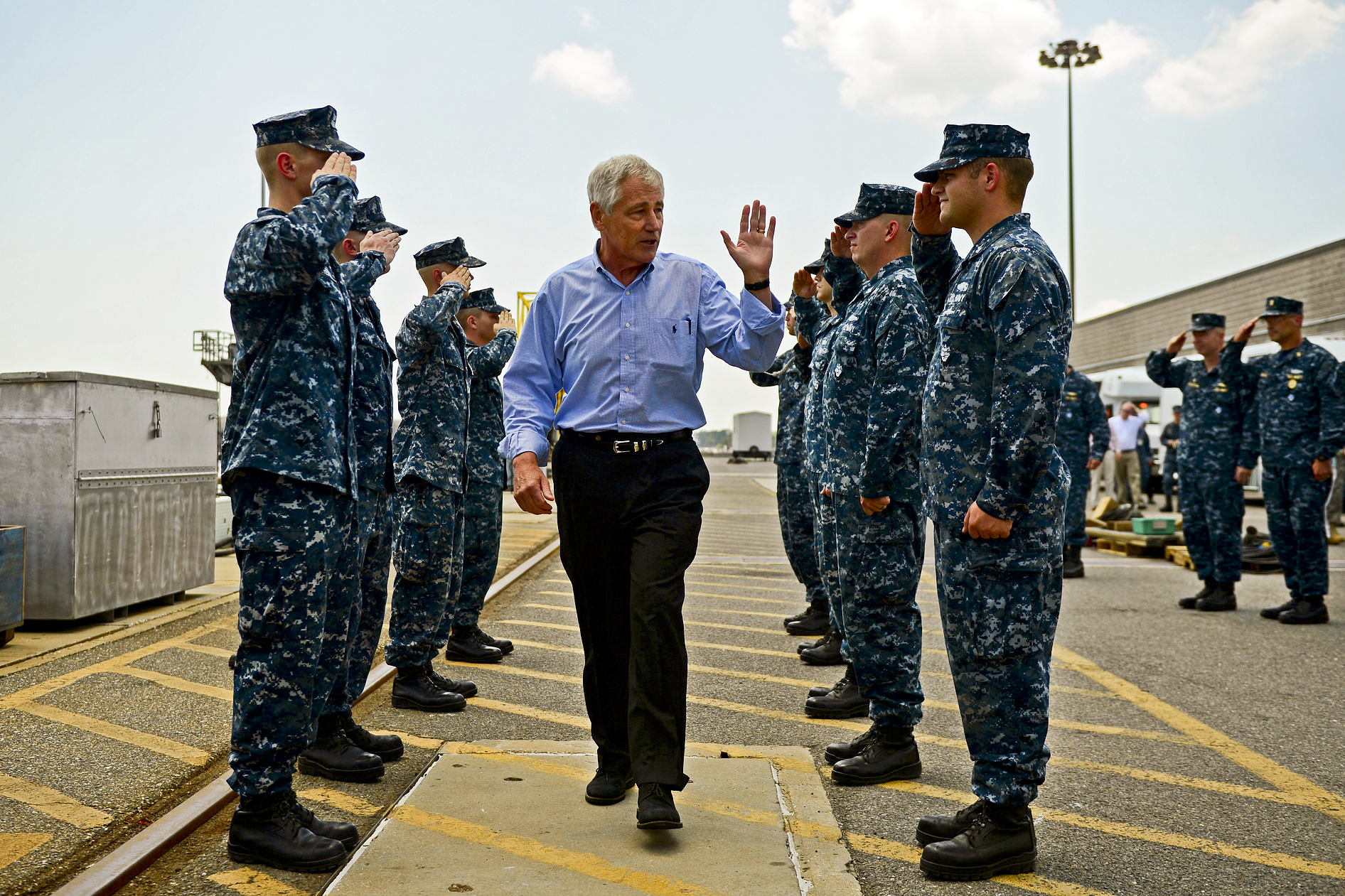
Secretary of Defense Chuck Hagel greets sailors at Kings Bay.

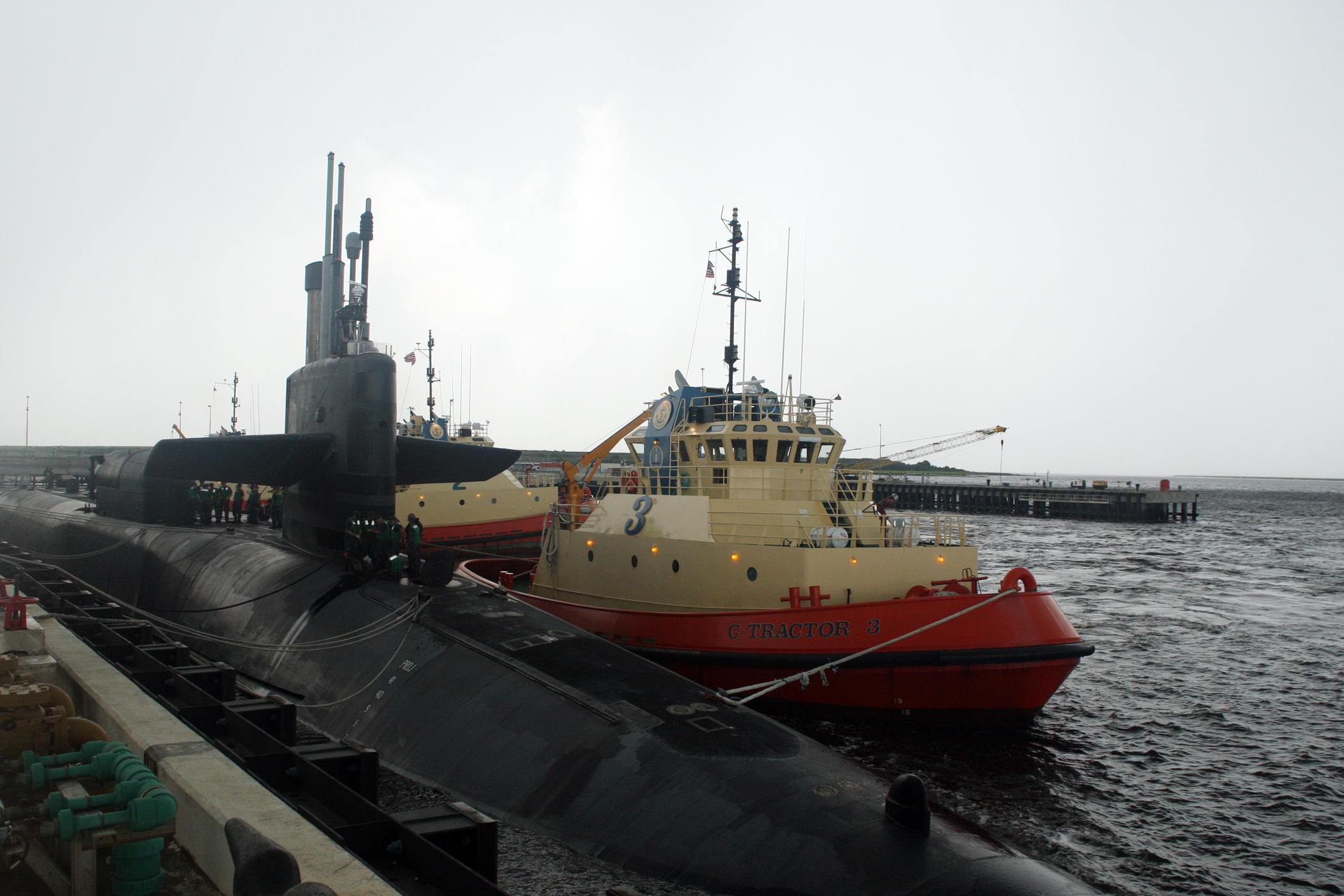
USS Georgia (SSGN-729) prepares to leave Kings Bay.

== See also ==
- Naval Submarine Base Bangor
- United States Navy submarine bases
- World War II United States Merchant Navy
