= USS Georgia (SSGN-729) =

Ohio-class submarine

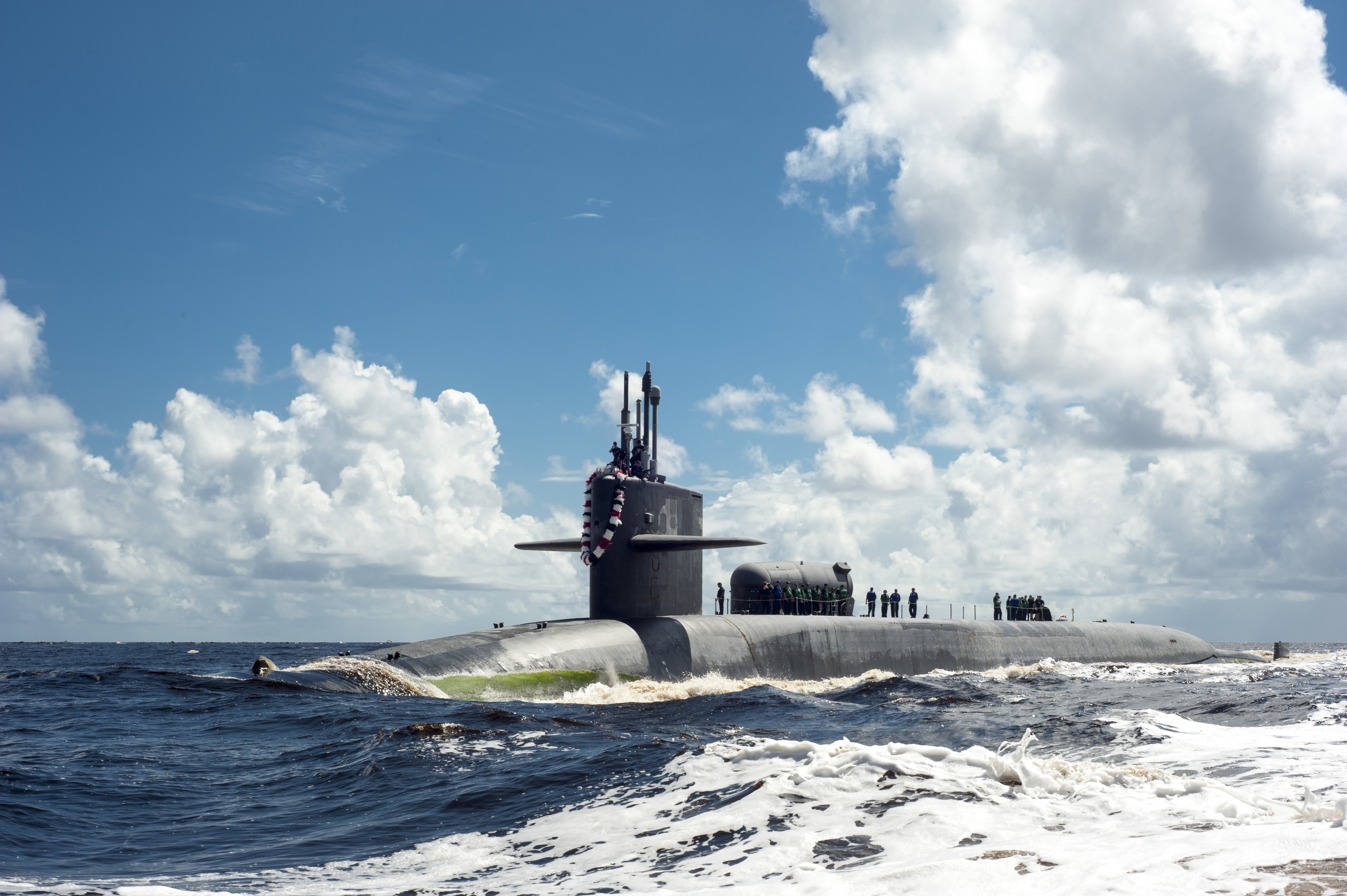
- USS Georgia (SSGN-729)

History

United States
- Namesake: State of Georgia
- Ordered: 20 February 1976
- Builder: General Dynamics Electric Boat
- Laid down: 7 April 1979
- Launched: 6 November 1982
- Sponsored by: Sheila M. Watkins
- Commissioned: 11 February 1984
- Out of service: 31st July 2026
- Home port: Kings Bay, Georgia, U.S.
- Motto: Furtim, Incurso, Mutatio (English: Stealth, Attack, Change)
- Status: Undergoing decommissioning
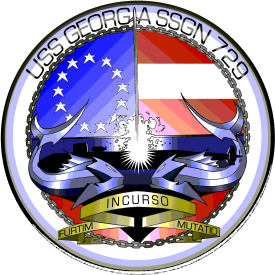
- Badge

General characteristics
- Class & type: Ohio-class submarine
- Displacement: 16,764 long tons (17,033 t) surfaced; 18,750 long tons (19,050 t) submerged
- Length: 560 ft (170 m)
- Beam: 42 ft (13 m)
- Draft: 38 ft (12 m)
- Propulsion: 1 × S8G PWR nuclear reactor (HEU 93.5%); 2 × geared turbines; 1 × 325 hp (242 kW) auxiliary motor; 1 × shaft @ 60,000 shp (45,000 kW)
- Speed: Greater than 25 knots (46 km/h; 29 mph)
- Test depth: Greater than 800 feet (240 m)
- Complement: 15 officers; 140 enlisted
- Armament: 4 × 21 in (533 mm) torpedo tubes; 154 × BGM-109 Tomahawks in 22 groups of seven

USS Georgia (hull number SSBN-729/SSGN-729), an Ohio-class cruise missile submarine, is the second vessel of the United States Navy to be named for the U.S. state of Georgia.

Commissioned on 11 February 1984, USS Georgia is based out of Kings Bay, Georgia, part of the strategic nuclear deterrent forces in the United States Atlantic Fleet.

The Navy announced it would inactivate the USS Georgia on 31 July 2026.

== Construction and commissioning ==
The contract to build her was awarded to the Electric Boat Division of General Dynamics Corporation in Groton, Connecticut on 20 February 1976 and her keel was laid down on 7 April 1979. She was launched on 6 November 1982 sponsored by Mrs. Sheila M. Watkins, wife of James D. Watkins, the then-Chief of Naval Operations, and commissioned as a fleet ballistic missile submarine (SSBN) on 11 February 1984, with Captain A. W. Kuester commanding the Blue crew and Captain M. P. Gray commanding the Gold crew. This boat was later converted to a guided missile submarine (SSGN) for carrying guided cruise missiles instead of fleet ballistic missiles in its missile compartment.

== Operational history as SSBN ==
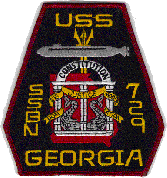
USS Georgia's ship's crest when she was an SSBN

From March to April 1984 she went on her shakedown cruise and test-launched a Trident C-4 missile in the Eastern Test Range on 7 April 1984. In November 1984, she arrived in her home port of Bangor, Washington. In January 1985 she started her first strategic deterrence patrol. As an element of Task Unit 14.7.1 from September 1983 to May 1986, she was awarded a Meritorious Unit Commendation. She was awarded her second Meritorious Unit Commendation for Submarine Operations between February 1986 to August 1986.

On 22 March 1986, three miles south of Midway Island, harbor tug USS Secota (YTM-415) had just completed a personnel transfer from Georgia, picking up a submarine crewman who was going on emergency leave, when Secota lost power and got hung up on Georgia's starboard stern plane while the sub's propeller continued to turn. That sank Secota within two minutes. Ten people were rescued, including the Georgia crewman who had just transferred to Secota. Two Secota crewmen trapped in her engine room were lost. While Lt. Cmdr. John Carman, a Navy spokesman for the U.S. Pacific Fleet, told the media that the Georgia was undamaged, a report sent by the Commanding Officer of the Georgia indicates that after returning the surviving Secota crew members to Hawaii, Georgia underwent emergency repairs for minor damage sustained in the collision.

Her Gold crew was awarded the Comsubron Seventeen Battle Efficiency Award for 2001.

On 30 October 2003, Georgia returned from her 65th and last deterrent patrol.

On 7 November 2003, while Georgia was docked at Bangor, Washington, her C-4 Trident I missiles were offloaded. The process proceeded smoothly until tube number 16. When each tube was opened, a ladder was lowered into the tube so a sailor could climb down and attach a hoist to lift the missile. After attaching the hoist to the missile in tube 16, the sailor climbed out, and the crew took a break without removing the ladder. When they returned, they began to hoist the missile, pulling against the ladder and cutting a nine-inch (230 mm) hole in its nose cone. No radioactive material was released.

Three enlisted men in the missile handling team faced a court-martial. The Strategic Weapons Facility Pacific was immediately shut down and inspected by the Navy, and failed to pass. SWFPAC's commanding officer, Captain Keith Lyles, was relieved of command on 19 December 2003, followed by his executive officer, Commander Phillip Jackson, weapons officer, Commander Marshall Millett, and Master Chief Petty Officer of the Command Steven Perry. SWFPAC reopened after passing inspection under a new commanding officer on 9 January 2004. Georgia's crew was unaffected.

== Conversion to SSGN ==
Georgia was redesignated to SSGN on 1 March 2004. In October 2004 she participated as the command node of Exercise Silent Hammer to validate and showcase the new Joint Warfare and ISR capabilities.

In March 2005, Georgia entered Norfolk Naval Shipyard for her scheduled Engineered Refueling Overhaul. The SSGN conversion took place concurrently. The conversion and refitting work was completed in February 2008. After the refit, Georgia moved to her new home port in Kings Bay, Georgia.

== Operational history as SSGN ==
Georgia was officially welcomed home in Kings Bay, Georgia, on 28 March 2008 in a return to service ceremony attended by Governor Sonny Perdue. In August 2009, Georgia began first SSGN deployment. In January 2010, Georgia earned a Squadron Sixteen battle efficiency "E" for 2009 together with an Engineering Red "E", Navigation Red and Green "N".

In December 2010 a bolt was left in the submarine's reduction gears. It caused $2.2 million in damage and forced the boat into three months of repairs. One officer and several enlisted sailors were disciplined over the event.

On 25 November 2015, Georgia struck a channel buoy and subsequently grounded while entering the Kings Bay Naval Submarine Base. The boat was placed into drydock for inspection and repairs which cost about $1 million. The navy stated that the damage was limited to the exterior of the sub and the hull was not compromised. The commanding officer of the Blue crew at the time of the accident - Captain David Adams - was relieved of duty on 4 January 2016 by Rear Adm. Randy B. Crites.

The Spanish Foreign Ministry lodged an official protest when Georgia docked at Gibraltar in April 2022.

In August 2024, Georgia was ordered by US Defense Secretary Lloyd Austin to move from the Mediterranean Sea into the waters of the Middle East as a deterrent against an anticipated Iranian attack on Israel.

On July 31, 2026, Georgia was inactivated at Submarine Base Kings Bay after returning from her final deployment. The process to formally decommission Georgia is expected to take several years.

== In fiction and documentary ==
- The Discovery Channel documentary Submarines: Sharks of Steel (1993) features Georgia and her crew.
- Georgia is featured in the 1996 science fiction film Independence Day.
- Georgia is featured prominently in the 2012 naval thriller Fire of the Raging Dragon by Don Brown.
- Georgia is featured in the 2020 medical thriller The End of October by Lawrence Wright.
