= S8G reactor =

Naval reactor used by the United States Navy

The S8G reactor is a naval reactor used by the United States Navy to provide electricity generation and propulsion on warships. The S8G designation stands for:

- S = Submarine platform
- 8 = Eighth generation core designed by the contractor
- G = General Electric was the contracted designer

== History ==
The S8G is a pressurized water reactor that uses highly enriched uranium designed by General Electric for use on the Ohio-class submarines. The 220 MWth S8G reactor compartment for the Ohio submarines is 42 feet (13 m) in diameter, 55 feet (17 m) long and weighs 2,750 tons. The S8G reactor is the direct follow-on to the S5G reactor.

== Design ==
This nuclear reactor uses natural circulation which is capable of operating at a significant fraction of full power without reactor coolant pumps.

A land-based prototype of the reactor plant was built at Knolls Atomic Power Laboratory's Kesselring Site in West Milton, New York. The prototype was used for testing and crew training throughout the 1980s. In 1994, the core was replaced with an S6W reactor, designed for the new Seawolf-class submarine.

The prototype is equipped with an automatic reactor fill system that can flood the reactor with borated water in the event of a loss-of-coolant accident.

The S8G reactor is in use in Ohio-class submarines and has a power rating of 26.1 MW.
