= List of United States Navy ships named after U.S. states =

The table below is a list of United States Navy ships named after U.S. states. The practice of naming commissioned ships for U.S. states and territories dates back to the Continental Navy during the time of the American Revolution. The conventions for naming ships of the US Navy were made law in 1862;

The vessels of the Navy shall be named by the Secretary of the Navy under direction of the President according to the following rule: Sailing-vessels of the first class shall be named after the States of the Union, those of the second class after the rivers, those of the third class after the principal cities and towns and those of the fourth class as the President may direct." - sec. 1531 (Title Thirteen, Chapter Six, of the U.S. Code)

A large majority of the ships named for states are battleships (BB), followed by submarines (SSN, SSBN & SSGN). The remainder are cruisers (ACR & CGN), monitors (BM) and patrol craft (SP) and an amphibious transport dock (LPD).

As of March 2021, thirty-seven ships currently in commission are named after U.S. states and one is named after a territory. Eleven states and one territory have been announced as names for ships that are under construction or authorized. Two state names (Kansas and South Carolina) and four populated territories (American Samoa, Guam, the Northern Mariana Islands, and the US Virgin Islands) are not currently planned for use.

The Virginia-class, which envisions a class size of 66 attack submarines, is the most recent class to use state names, with 28 of the active and announced boats being named after U.S. states, though that convention appears to have changed. The Ohio-class of ballistic missile submarines has 17 boats with state names, and the Seawolf-class (attack subs), the Columbia-class (missile subs) and the San Antonio-class of amphibious transport docks use one name each, for a total of 48.

== States ==
U.S. Navy ships named after U.S. states
State	Currently commissioned	Formerly commissioned	Remarks
Alabama	SSBN-731	BB-60, SP-1052, BB-8	
Alaska	SSBN-732		CB-1 and ID-3035 were named for the Territory of Alaska, not the state
Arizona		BB-39	SSN-803 authorized
Arkansas		CGN-41, BB-33, BM-7	SSN-800 under construction
California	SSN-781	CGN-36, BB-44, SP-647, SP-249, ACR-6	
Colorado	SSN-788	BB-45, ACR-7	
Connecticut	SSN-22	BB-18	
Delaware	SSN-791	BB-28	
Florida	SSGN-728	BB-30, BM-9	
Georgia	SSGN-729	BB-15	
Hawaii	SSN-776		CB-3 was named for the Territory of Hawaii, not the state
Idaho	SSN-799	BB-42, SP-545, BB-24	
Illinois	SSN-786	BB-65 (cancelled), BB-7	
Indiana	SSN-789	BB-58, BB-50 (cancelled), BB-1	
Iowa	SSN-797	BB-61, BB-53 (cancelled), BB-4	
Kansas		BB-21	
Kentucky	SSBN-737	BB-66 (cancelled), BB-6	
Louisiana	SSBN-743	BB-71 (cancelled), BB-19	
Maine	SSBN-741	BB-69 (cancelled), BB-10, ACR-1	
Maryland	SSBN-738	BB-46, ACR-8	
Massachusetts	SSN-798	BB-59, BB-54 (cancelled), BB-2	
Michigan	SSGN-727	BB-27	
Minnesota	SSN-783	BB-22	
Mississippi	SSN-782	CGN-40, BB-41, BB-23	
Missouri	SSN-780	BB-63, BB-11	
Montana	SSN-794	BB-67 (cancelled), BB-51 (cancelled), ACR-13	
Nebraska	SSBN-739	BB-14	
Nevada	SSBN-733	BB-36, BM-8	
New Hampshire	SSN-778	BB-70 (cancelled), BB-25	
New Jersey	SSN-796	BB-62, BB-16	
New Mexico	SSN-779	BB-40	
New York	LPD-21	BB-34, ACR-2	
North Carolina	SSN-777	BB-55, BB-52 (cancelled), ACR-12	
North Dakota	SSN-784	BB-29	
Ohio	SSGN-726	BB-68 (cancelled), BB-12, 1820	
Oklahoma		BB-37	SSN-802 authorized
Oregon	SSN-793	BB-3	
Pennsylvania	SSBN-735	BB-38, ACR-4	
Rhode Island	SSBN-740	BB-17	
South Carolina		CGN-37, BB-26	
South Dakota	SSN-790	BB-57, BB-49 (cancelled), ACR-9	
Tennessee	SSBN-734	BB-43, ACR-10	
Texas	SSN-775	CGN-39, BB-35	
Utah		BB-31	SSN-801 under construction
Vermont	SSN-792	BB-20	
Virginia	SSN-774	CGN-38, SP-1965, SP-746, SP-274, BB-13	
Washington	SSN-787	BB-56, BB-47, ACR-11	CVN-73, SSBN-598, and ID-3018 are named after the president, not the state
West Virginia	SSBN-736	BB-48, ACR-5	
Wisconsin		BB-64, BB-9	SSBN-827 authorized
Wyoming	SSBN-742	BB-32, BM-10	

== Territories and federal district ==
U.S. Navy ships named after U.S. territories and D.C.
Territory	Currently commissioned	Formerly commissioned	Remarks
Populated territories
American Samoa			CB-6 cancelled before construction
District of Columbia			SSBN-826 under construction. SSN-771, CL-56, AG-9, & C-12 were named after American cities also named Columbia
Guam		PG-43, CB-2, LPH-9, T-HST-1	
Northern Mariana Islands			USS Saipan (CVL-48) and (LHA-2), both named for the Battle of Saipan, which took place on the island of Saipan, the largest and most populous island and the capital of CNMI
Puerto Rico	T-EPF-11	HST-2	CB-5 cancelled before construction
United States Virgin Islands			USS Saint Croix (APA-231) was most likely named for St. Croix County, Wisconsin, as opposed to the USV Island of Saint Croix
Minor territories
Midway Atoll		AG-41, CVE-63, CV-41	Technically named after the Battle of Midway
Palmyra Atoll		ARST-3	
Wake Island		PR-3, CVE-65	
Former territories
Philippines			CB-4 cancelled before construction.

== See also ==
- United States ship naming conventions
