= United States ship naming conventions =

Traditional naming patterns used by American naval ships

Naming conventions for ships of the United States Navy were established by congressional action at least as early as 1862. Title 13, section 1531, of the U.S. Code, enacted in that year, reads, in part,

The vessels of the Navy shall be named by the Secretary of the Navy under direction of the President according to the following rule: Sailing-vessels of the first class shall be named after the States of the Union, those of the second class after the rivers, those of the third class after the principal cities and towns and those of the fourth class as the President may direct.

Further clarification was made by executive order of President Theodore Roosevelt in 1907. However, elements had existed since before his time. If a ship is reclassified, for example a destroyer is converted to a mine layer, it retains its original name.

== Traditional conventions ==
- Aircraft carriers (AV, CV, CVA, CVB and CVL), the Navy's first carrier, USS Langley (CV-1), was converted from a collier, while carriers USS Lexington (CV-2) and USS Saratoga (CV-3) were started as battlecruisers but were also converted to carriers due to the Washington Naval Treaty. USS Ranger (CV-4) was the first purpose-made carrier. Like battlecruisers, the names of battles or famous U.S. Navy ships became the standard for aircraft carriers, with the exception of:
  - USS Langley (CV-1), USS Wright (CVL-49) , and USS Kitty Hawk (CVA-63), which were all references to aviation. (Note: And the possible exception of USS Shangri-La (CV-38), which can be said to have been named after a "battle," the Doolittle Raid) (Note: Technically the Essex-class carriers Franklin, Randolph and Hancock were named for the Continental Navy ships which bore the names of those men, not the men themselves.)
  - USS Hancock (CV-19), named for John Hancock, a Founding Father, USS Franklin D. Roosevelt (CVB-42), named for US President Franklin D. Roosevelt, and USS Forrestal (CVA-59), named for James Forrestal, the first US Secretary of Defense, were all named for politicians.
  - USS Independence (CVL-22) and USS Independence (CV-62) were named for the concept of independence.
- Ammunition ships (AE) were named either after volcanoes (e.g., Mauna Loa) or words relating to fire and explosions (e.g., Nitro and Pyro).
- Battlecruisers (CC) under the 1916 program were to receive names of battles or famous U.S. Navy ships with significant overlap since several famous U.S. Navy ships were named after Revolutionary War battles.
- Battleships (hull code BB), by law, were named for states, except for USS Kearsarge (BB-5), which was named after a mountain in Merrimack County, New Hampshire, and an American Civil War sloop-of-war.
- Combat stores ships (AK, AF, and AFS) were named after stars and other heavenly bodies.
- Cruisers, both light and heavy (CL and CA), were named for cities in the United States and its territories, with the exception of USS Canberra (CA-70), which is named after HMAS Canberra (D33) and Canberra, the capital of Australia, making USS Canberra the only U.S. warship named for a foreign warship and foreign capital city.
  - Large cruisers (CB) under the 1940 program were named for United States territories.
  - Cruiser, guided missile, nuclear powered (CGN), after the first nuclear-powered guided missile cruiser, USS Long Beach (CGN-9), (Note: Long Beach was the last U.S. warship built on a true cruiser hull.) CGNs of the California and Virginia classes were named for states, with the exception of;
    - USS Bainbridge and USS Truxtun, which were commissioned as frigates.
- Destroyers (DD) and destroyer Escorts (DE) were named for Navy and Marine Corps heroes, with the exception of;
  - USS Douglas A. Munro (DE-422), named for Douglas Albert Munro the only member of the US Coast Guard to ever receive the Medal of Honor but who was under the command of the U.S. Navy at the time rather than the peacetime command of the Department of the Treasury.
- Destroyer leaders (DL) were likewise named after naval heroes; these were reclassified as cruisers or destroyers in 1975.
- Escort Carriers (CVE) were initially named after bays and sounds though many received battle names while under construction. Escort carriers that appear to be named for cities or islands, such as USS Casablanca (CVE-55) or USS Guadalcanal (CVE-60) were actually named for battles fought at those locations.
- Fast combat support ships (AOE) were named after U.S. cities.
- Fleet tugs (AT) and harbor tugs (YT) were named after Native American tribes.
- Frigates (FF), formerly ocean escorts, were named for naval heroes.
- Gunboats (PG, PHM, and PC) named for smaller U.S. cities while river gunboats were named for islands
- Hospital ships (AH) were given names related to their function, such as Comfort and Mercy.
- Landing ship, tank (LST) built for the United States Navy during and immediately after World War II were only given an LST-number hull designation, but on 1 July 1955, county or Louisiana-parish names were assigned to those ships which remained in service. More recent LSTs were named on launching.
- Minesweepers (MS) were named for birds, or after "positive traits," e.g. Admirable and Dextrous.
- Nuclear ballistic missile submarines (SSBN), (the first forty-one boats), also called "boomers", were named after historical statesmen considered "Great Americans" of the Americas such as USS Simon Bolivar (SSBN-641).
- Oilers (AO and AOR) were named for rivers with Native American names, and colliers named for mythical figures.
- Submarines (SS and SSN) were either given a class letter and number, as in S-class submarines, or the names of fish and marine mammals.

== Contemporary ship naming conventions and their exceptions ==
- Aircraft carriers, both with conventional and nuclear propulsion, (CV and CVN), have a history of various legacy names, mostly battles, until 1968, with the commissioning of USS John F. Kennedy (CV-67). Since then, carriers have been named for U.S. presidents, with the exception of;
  - ships named Enterprise; there is a continuing exception for this name, first used in 1775, eight ships have carried the name, including three aircraft carriers (CV-6, CVN-65 and CVN-80).
  - USS Nimitz (CVN-68), lead ship of her class, named for Fleet Admiral Chester W. Nimitz, commander of all U.S. and Allied naval forces in the Pacific theatre during World War II,
  - USS Carl Vinson (CVN-70), named for a former Congressman, Chairman of the Naval Affairs Committee, Chairman of the successor United States House Committee on Armed Services, a strong supporter of the Navy through the Naval Act of 1938 (also called the "Vinson Acts") who became known as "The Father of the Two-Ocean Navy",
  - USS John C. Stennis (CVN-74), named for a former United States Senator, President pro tempore of the Senate, Chairman of the United States Senate Committee on Armed Services, and a strong supporter of the navy, who became known as "Father of America's modern navy".
  - USS Doris Miller (CVN-81), named for the first black American to be awarded the Navy Cross, for his actions during the Attack on Pearl Harbor.
- Amphibious assault ships (LPH, LHA, and LHD) are named after early U.S. sailing ships, such as USS Bonhomme Richard (LHD-6), U.S. Marine Corps battles, such as USS Iwo Jima (LHD-7), or legacy names of earlier carriers from World War II, such as USS Essex (LHD-2).
- Amphibious command ships (LCC) are named for geographical areas within the U.S., such as mountains or mountain ranges.
- Amphibious transport docks (LPD) are named after U.S. cities, with the exception of the following:
  - USS Mesa Verde (LPD-19), named after Mesa Verde National Park in Colorado,
  - USS New York (LPD-21), named for the State of New York (instead of New York City), after a special request for the name was made by NY State Governor George E. Pataki to the Navy shortly after the September 11 attacks of 2001,
  - USS Arlington (LPD-24), named for Arlington County, Virginia, where Flight 77 crashed into The Pentagon during the September 11 attacks of 2001,
  - USS Somerset (LPD-25), named for Somerset County, Pennsylvania, where Flight 93 crashed during the September 11 attacks of 2001,
  - USS John P. Murtha (LPD-26), named for a former U.S. Marine Corps Officer, Vietnam War veteran, former Congressman and chairman of the United States House Appropriations Subcommittee on Defense,
  - USS Richard M. McCool Jr. (LPD-29), named for a World War II Naval Officer and Medal of Honor recipient.
- Auxiliary floating drydocks (ARDM), such as USS Oak Ridge (ARDM-1), are named after towns having nuclear power generators or nuclear research facilities.
- Ballistic missile submarines and guided missile submarines (SSBN and SSGN) are named dependent on class;
  - Ohio-class, (both SSBN and SSGN) are named after states, with the exception of;
    - USS Henry M. Jackson (SSBN-730), named for a former U.S. Senator and strong supporter of the military,
  - Columbia-class (SSBN), thus far the Navy has only announced the names of the first three submarines;
    - USS District of Columbia (SSBN-826), - the lead boat, named for the federal capital of the U.S.,
    - USS Wisconsin (SSBN-827), named for the state of Wisconsin, and
    - USS Groton (SSBN-828), named for the town that is home to both Naval Submarine Base New London, the Navy's east coast submarine base, and the headquarters of General Dynamics Electric Boat, the builder of the Navy's nuclear missile submarines, and one of two builders of the Navy's nuclear attack submarines.

As of March 2023, in a report to congress, the Navy has announced that while the class would continue to be known as the Columbia-class, there was as of yet no particular naming scheme set for the class. But with only two state names available, a change to a different scheme is likely, see the Virginia-class submarine entry for more information.

- Dock landing ships (LSD) are named after cities or important places in U.S. and U.S. naval history.
- Dry cargo ships (T-AKE) are named for U.S. explorers, pioneers, activists and U.S. naval officers.
- Expeditionary fast transports (T-EPF) are named for U.S. cities, with the exception of;
  - USNS Spearhead (T-EPF-1), the lead ship of her class, named after a similar ship of the same name, USAV Spearhead (TSV-X1), previously in service with the US Army,
  - USNS Choctaw County (T-EPF-2), named for 3 different counties with the same name in the states of Alabama, Mississippi and Oklahoma,
  - USNS Puerto Rico (T-EPF-11), named for an unincorporated territory of the U.S., located in the Caribbean.
- Expeditionary Transfer Dock (ESD) and their sub-variant, Expeditionary Mobile Base (ESB), have been named for U.S. Marine Corps heroes, with the exception of;
  - USNS Montford Point (T-ESD-1), the lead ship of the class, named in honor of African American Marine Corps recruits who trained at Montford Point Camp, North Carolina, from 1942 to 1949.
- Fast attack submarines (nuclear powered), (SSN) names are dependent on class;
  - Los Angeles class, named after cities, with the exception of;
    - USS Hyman G. Rickover (SSN-709), named for an Admiral who was a pioneer of the nuclear Navy,
  - Seawolf class, (only 3 boats in class);
    - Lead boat; USS Seawolf (SSN-21), named for the Atlantic wolffish, and the fourth submarine to carry the name,
    - 2nd boat; USS Connecticut (SSN-22), named for a U.S. state,
    - 3rd boat; USS Jimmy Carter (SSN-23), named for a former U.S. president, and Naval officer, who served aboard submarines.
  - Virginia class, a class of a planned 66 boats, were initially named for U.S. states, with two early exceptions;
    - USS John Warner (SSN-785), named for a former Secretary of the Navy, U.S. Senator from Virginia, and Chairman of the Senate Committee on Armed Services,
    - USS Hyman G. Rickover (SSN-795), named for an Admiral and pioneer of the nuclear Navy. This is the second boat to carry the name, along with SSN-709.

After the 30th boat and with only two available state names remaining, the Navy began using legacy names of previous attack submarines. Navy Secretary Kenneth Braithwaite stated that he; "...supports naming future submarines after past vessels with historic naval legacies." The next four boats of the class (SSN-804 to SSN-807) have so far followed this naming scheme, (with all four also being names of fish, another previous naming convention of submarines). A report to Congress on 4 February 2021, advised the Navy had not indicated these exceptions as being a change to the policy for naming ships.

    - USS John H. Dalton (SSN-808) - named for a Navy Secretary and prior to that, a Naval Academy graduate who served aboard two submarines, USS Blueback (SS-581) an attack submarine, and USS John C. Calhoun (SSBN-630), a ballistic missile submarine.

On 8 March 2023, in a report to congress, the Navy stated that while they do not have a set naming scheme for the remainder of the Virginia-class boats (after SSN-808), they were examining the possibility of continuing with state names. Since state named Ohio-class boats are scheduled to be decommissioned on a regular basis beginning in 2026, and the next planned, unnamed Virginia-class boats will not be entering service until 2028, the Navy will see if that gap can be exploited to take state names as they become available from decommissioned Ohio boats and almost immediately attach them to new Virginia boats as they're commissioned into service.
Following John H. Dalton, the class has seen a mix of names, such as;
- USS Long Island (SSN-809) - named for the island off the coast of New York City. It is part of the New York metropolitan area, sharing two of its boroughs.
The remaining four Block V boats have been named after U.S. cities. Of the first three Block VI boats, one has also been named for a city, while the other two are again outliers;
- USS Potomac (SSN-814) - named for the river the runs from West Virginia and past Washington, D.C. to the Atlantic, and

    - USS Brooklyn (SSN-816) - named for most populous of New York's five boroughs.

As of August 2025, while Arizona has so far been the last state name assigned, there has been no official change to the naming policy announced. Rather, it appears that the Navy is selecting names that are appropriate based on their history and availability, but vary due to changes in administrations and secretaries, and their preferences.

- Fast combat support ships (AOE) are named for distinguished supply ships of the past.
- Guided missile cruisers (CG) are named after battles, with the exception of;
  - USS Thomas S. Gates (CG-51), a Ticonderoga-class cruiser named for a former Secretary of Defense.
  - USS Chancellorsville (CG-62), in early 2022, the Navy announced that based on a recommendation from The Naming Commission, the Ticonderoga-class cruiser Chancellorsville, would have her name changed to honor Robert Smalls. Smalls was a Civil War-era slave and civilian river pilot for the Confederate States Navy (CSN). In a daring Ruse de guerre involving mutiny and piracy, Smalls and a small group of slaves with their families, took CSS Planter, a CSN gunboat, while the guards were asleep on shore, and fled to a Union Navy blockade where he surrendered the ship, gaining his freedom.
- Guided missile destroyers (DDG) names are dependent on class;
  - Arleigh Burke, a class of a planned 89 ships (which may be extended to as many as 118), was originally to retain the traditional naming convention for destroyers: that of U.S. Navy and Marine Corps leaders and heroes. Some of these leaders are men who fought in the Revolutionary War as a part of the original Continental Navy, while others took part in the early days of the U.S. Navy fighting in the Quasi and Barbary Wars, the War of 1812, the Civil War and the Spanish–American War. In these early conflicts through to World War II, and up to the war on terror, many Sailors and Marines, from cooks to SEALs to Marine Commandants and Fleet Admirals, distinguished themselves in battle, earning the Medal of Honor or Navy Cross, as well as other medals (posthumously in some cases). In the 21st century, the Navy has broadened the term "leaders and heroes" to include politicians (such as U.S. Senators and Navy Secretaries) who have made significant contributions to the Navy away from the battlefield, and men and women of the Navy Department who have become pioneers in the fields of technology and strategy, as well as for civil rights, breaking through barriers for women and minorities. Along with all those named for the above listed criteria are the following exceptions;
    - USS Stethem (DDG-63), named for Navy Seabee diver Robert Stethem, who was taken hostage by terrorist group Hezbollah aboard hijacked civilian TWA Flight 847. He was identified as U.S. military, tortured, and murdered, and his body then deposited on the tarmac at the Beirut airport,
    - USS The Sullivans (DDG-68), named for five brothers who were all lost when their light cruiser, USS Juneau (CL-52) was sunk by the Japanese at the Naval Battle of Guadalcanal, which led to the War Department adopting the Sole Survivor Policy,
    - USS Higgins (DDG-76), named for Marine Corps Colonel William R. Higgins, who while on a UN Peacekeeping mission to Lebanon, was kidnapped, tortured, and murdered by terrorists,
    - USS Winston S. Churchill (DDG-81), named for Winston Churchill, the renowned Prime Minister of the United Kingdom and close ally of the U.S. during World War II,
    - USS Mustin (DDG-89), named for the entire Mustin family, with extensive ties to the Navy, and among which family members are 18 officers, 10 of whom are flag or general rank,
    - USS Daniel Inouye (DDG-118), named for a U.S. Senator and former U.S. Army officer awarded the Medal of Honor in WWII,
    - USS Ted Stevens (DDG-128), named for a U.S. Senator for Alaska and former Army Air Forces pilot who served in the China Burma India Theater during WWII, and was awarded the Distinguished Flying Cross and Air Medal.
    - USS Quentin Walsh (DDG-132), named for a US Coast Guard officer who was awarded the Navy Cross for his actions during the Normandy landings.
  - Zumwalt class, (only 3 ships in class);
    - Lead ship USS Zumwalt (DDG-1000), named for Elmo Zumwalt, the youngest Admiral to serve as Chief of Naval Operations, and who played a significant role during the Vietnam War,
    - 2nd ship USS Michael Monsoor (DDG-1001), named for a former Navy SEAL and Medal of Honor recipient killed in action during the Iraq War,
    - 3rd ship USS Lyndon B. Johnson (DDG-1002), named for a former U.S. president and U.S. naval officer who was awarded the Silver Star during WW II
- Guided missile frigates (FFG) are named for U.S. Navy and Marine Corps heroes and leaders, up to and including the last class in active service, the 71-ship Oliver Hazard Perry-class (1977–2015). The Navy announced the new Constellation-class, with a planned 20 frigates in 2020, with the first three ships of the class so far named in honor of three of the original six frigates of the U.S. Navy. The first ship is expected to be delivered by 2026. A report to Congress in 2021 advised the Navy had not stated this naming scheme was a change in the rules for naming ships.
- Littoral combat ships (LCS) are named for regionally-important U.S. cities and communities. Exceptions are the lead ships of the first two classes for this type;
  - USS Freedom (LCS-1), lead ship of her class, named for the concept of freedom,
  - USS Independence (LCS-2), lead ship of her class, named for the concept of independence,
  - USS Gabrielle Giffords (LCS-10), an Independence class LCS named for a former Congresswoman, member of the United States House Committee on Armed Services and survivor of an assassination attempt,
  - USS Canberra (LCS-30), an Independence-class LCS named after the Australian heavy cruiser HMAS Canberra (D33), for her valor at the Battle of Savo Island, and the city of Canberra, the capital of Australia, making it the only littoral combat ship named after a foreign warship and foreign capital.
- Mine countermeasures ships (MCM) have mostly legacy names of previous U.S. Navy ships, especially WWII-era minesweepers.
- Patrol boats (PC) have names based on weather phenomena.
- Replenishment oilers (T-AO) were conventionally named for rivers. An exception is the current, 18-ship Henry J. Kaiser-class, the first half of which were named for shipbuilders, industrialists, marine and aeronautical engineers. The remaining half of the class, returned to the previous convention of river names. While river names is the de jure convention, for the next class of oilers, the John Lewis-class, the Navy announced that they will be named after prominent civil rights activists and leaders. There are 20 ships planned for this class, with the first eight ordered and named by early 2022.

== See also ==
- List of current ships of the United States Navy
- List of Military Sealift Command ships
- List of U.S. military vessels named after women
- List of United States Navy ships commemorating the Confederate States of America
- United States Navy ships
- Hull classification symbol
