= USS Wisconsin =

USS Wisconsin may refer to:

- USS Wisconsin (BB-9) was an Illinois-class battleship
- USS Wisconsin (BB-64) is an Iowa-class battleship
- USS Wisconsin (SSBN-827) a planned Columbia-class submarine

== See also ==
- SS Wisconsin, a shipwrecked package freighter in Lake Michigan
