= S1B reactor =

Naval nuclear reactor

The S1B reactor is used by the United States Navy to generate electricity and propulsion on Columbia-class submarines. The naval nuclear reactor's designation follows the scheme of type (submarine), generation (the first), and manufacturer (Bechtel).

This pressurized water nuclear reactor, developed at the Knolls Atomic Power Laboratory, is designed to have increased energy density and to operate for 40 years without refueling.
