= USS Pyro (AE-1) =

Ammunition ship of the United States Navy

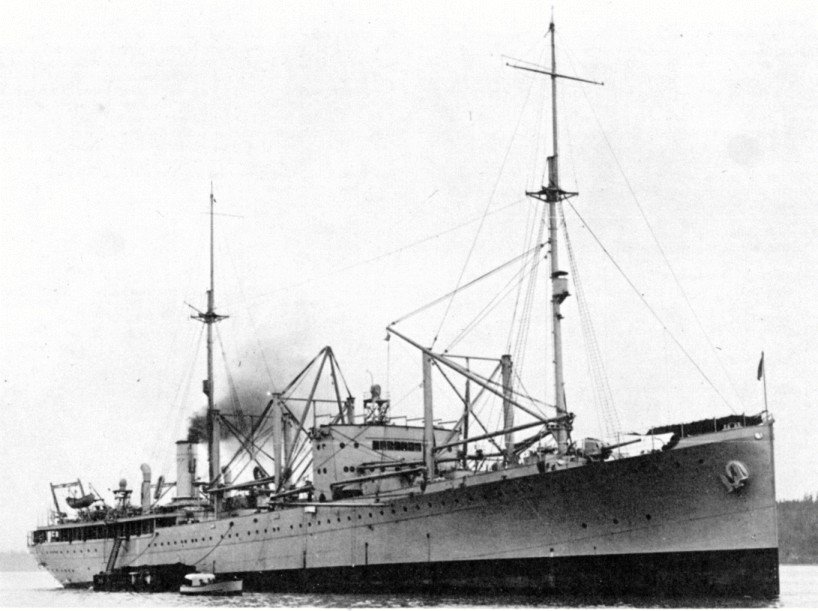
- USS Pyro (AE-1)

History

United States
- Laid down: 9 August 1918
- Launched: 16 December 1919
- Commissioned: 10 August 1920; 1 July 1939
- Decommissioned: 10 September 1924; 12 June 1946
- Stricken: 3 July 1946
- Fate: Scrapped

General characteristics
- Displacement: Light: 7,025 tons; Full load: 10,600 tons
- Length: 482 ft 9 in (147 m)
- Beam: 60 ft 11 in (18.6 m)
- Draught: 20 ft 11 in (6.4 m)
- Armament: 2 × single 5 in (130 mm) 38 caliber guns; 4 × 3 in (76 mm) 50 caliber guns; 4 × 40 mm guns

The first USS Pyro (AE–1) was an ammunition ship of the United States Navy, commissioned from 1920 to 1924 and from 1939 to 1946. Primarily operating in the Pacific Ocean, the Pyro was present during the Attack on Pearl Harbor.

== History ==
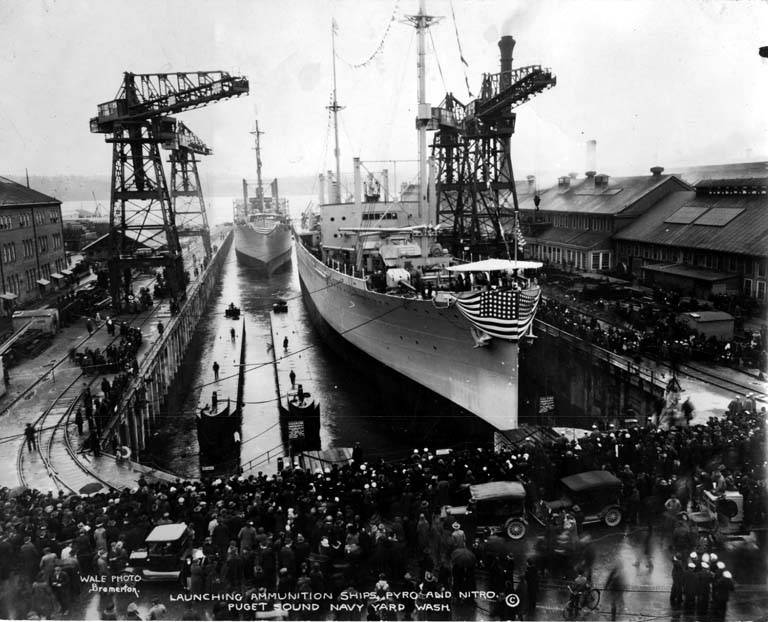
Launching of the Pyro (closest to camera) and Nitro on 16 December 1919

The ship was laid down 9 August 1918 at Puget Sound Navy Yard in the state of Washington; launched 16 December 1919; sponsored by Mrs. G. A. Bissett, wife of Commander Guy Aloysius Bissett, the Construction Officer at Puget Sound Navy Yard. A sister ship, the USS Nitro (AE-2), was launched the same day.

=== First commission ===
The ship was first commissioned on 10 August 1920. After shakedown, Pyro was assigned to the Naval Transportation Service. She departed Puget Sound 18 September 1920 on her first voyage to the east coast, arriving New York one month later. Her principal operations were conducted between ports which extended from Puget Sound on the west coast to as far north as Boston on the east coast. Her most frequent ports of call included Mare Island, San Francisco, San Pedro, San Diego, Balboa, Guantanamo Bay, Norfolk, Philadelphia, and New York. Besides ammunition and explosives, she also carried general cargo and some passengers.

By April 1924, Pyro completed five additional runs to the east coast from California ports. Her Pacific operations took her as far as the Philippine Islands. Upon return from the east coast on 22 April 1924, she put in at Bremerton and decommissioned at the Puget Sound Navy Yard on 10 September.

=== Second commission ===
Pyro was recommissioned on 1 July 1939. In late 1939, Doris Miller, who later became the first Black American to be awarded the Navy Cross, served on the ship. Assigned to the Naval Transportation Service, Pyro resumed transport of ammunition, general cargo, and passengers, making five voyages to the east coast and five to Pearl Harbor by August 1941. She was assigned to Commander, Base Force, Train Squadron 8, Pacific Fleet on 22 August 1941. Departing Mare Island on 1 October, she arrived at Pearl Harbor one week later to commence operations in the Hawaiian area.

Pyro was moored at West Loch in Pearl Harbor during the Japanese attack on 7 December 1941. She suffered no serious damage and was credited with damaging one Japanese plane. Four days later, she departed Pearl Harbor for San Francisco, and carried ammunition from the west coast to Pearl Harbor until 30 September 1942. On 17 October, she departed San Francisco for Alaskan waters where she issued a load of mines to smaller ships to be planted as a defense for the base at Adak. She returned to San Francisco on 19 November.

She departed San Francisco 8 December 1942, and upon arrival at Espiritu Santo, New Hebrides Islands, on 2 January 1943, became primary ammunition ship for various fleet units that were operating in the area. Pyro steamed for San Francisco 2 August, arriving 7 September.

Departing San Francisco on 11 November 1943 for Brisbane, Australia, she reported to Commander, Service Force, 7th Fleet on 7 December 1943. From that date until 8 April 1944, Pyro transported ammunition from Australia, New Caledonia and the New Hebrides to Milne Bay, New Guinea. From 13 April through 12 July 1944, she replenished combatants engaged in the Admiralty Islands and Hollandia, campaigns at various New Guinea harbors.

Pyro arrived at Sydney, Australia, on 18 July 1944 for six weeks of repairs, returning 9 September to the new base of operations at Hollandia, where units of the fleet assembled for the invasion of Leyte. The ship remained at Hollandia until 3 November when she steamed to Seeadler Bay, Manus Island, Admiralty Islands, for emergency repairs and reloading, returning to Hollandia on 1 December 1944. She steamed for Leyte Gulf on 19 December, arriving one week later and remaining in the Philippine area replenishing combatants until 4 August 1945. Pyro then steamed for the Admiralty Islands for repair and overhaul.

She departed the Admiralty Islands on 17 October with a load of serviceable ammunition for transfer to the United States. After embarking troops en route at Eniwetok, Marshall Islands, she arrived at Seattle on 21 November 1945. She remained there until 17 February 1946 and then steamed for San Francisco Bay, arriving the next day. After discharging her ammunition, she returned to Seattle on 2 April. Pyro decommissioned at Seattle on 12 June and was struck from the Navy List on 3 July.

=== Late history ===
The ship was turned over to the War Shipping Administration on 14 July 1946, and in March 1950 she was sold to the National Metal and Steel company of Terminal Island, California, for scrapping. In July 1951, the ship was reported as "now being scrapped", with its steam whistle donated for emergency use by the port of Wilmington, Los Angeles. Since at least 1956, the ship's bell has been located at the Puget Sound Navy Museum.

== Awards and honors ==
Pyro earned one battle star for World War II service.

== See also ==
- See USS Pyro for other ships of the same name.
