= USS Nitro (AE-2) =

American ammunition ship

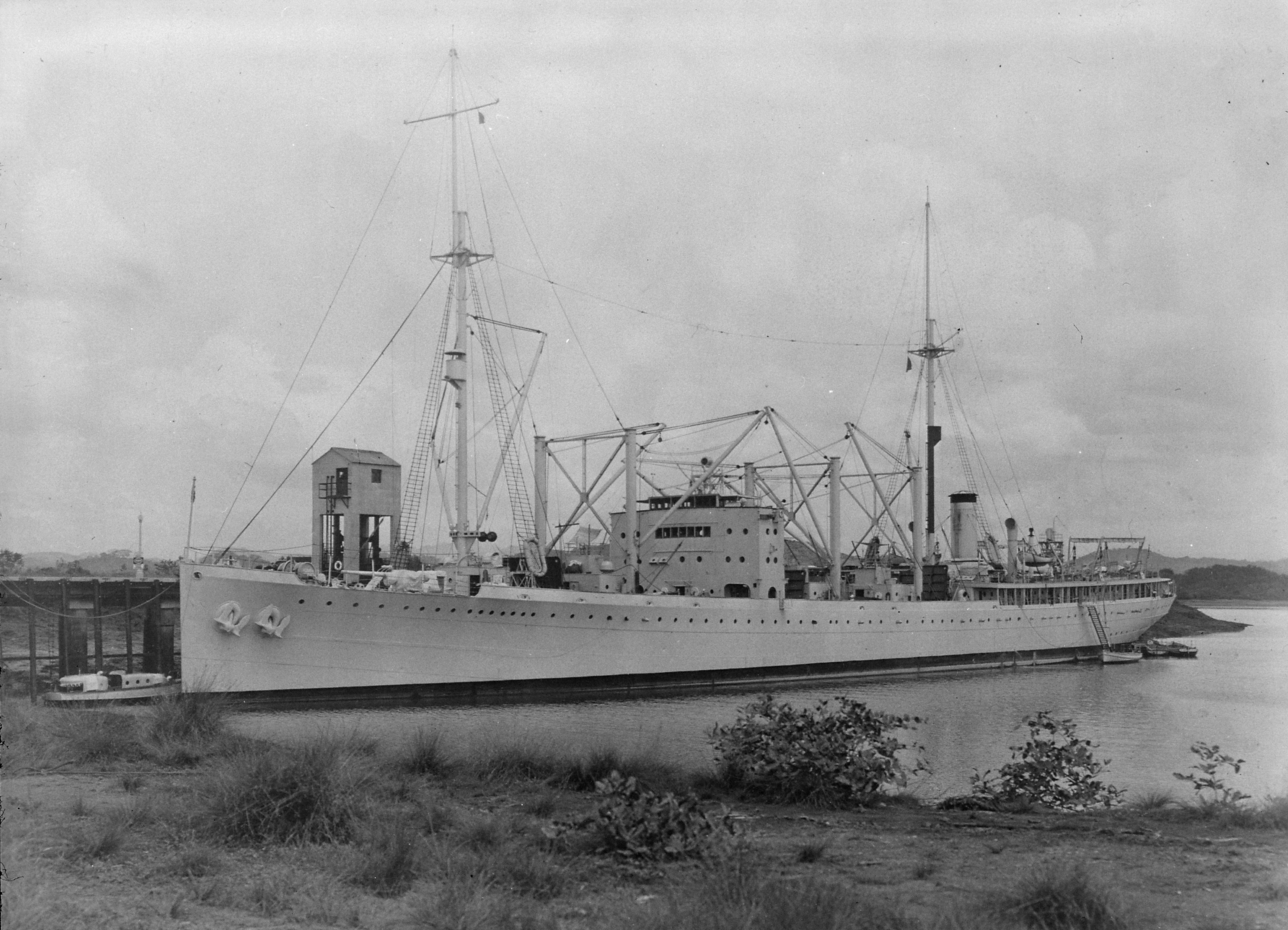
- USS Nitro (AE-2)

History

United States
- Laid down: 19 March 1919
- Launched: 16 December 1919
- Commissioned: 1 April 1921
- Decommissioned: 30 November 1945
- Honors and awards: 1 Battle Star
- Fate: Scrapped

General characteristics
- Displacement: Light: 7,025 tons; Full load: 10,600 tons
- Length: 482 ft 9 in (147 m)
- Beam: 60 ft 11 in (18.6 m)
- Draft: 20 ft 11 in (6.4 m)
- Armament: 4 × single 5 in (130 mm) 38 caliber guns; 2 × 3 in (76 mm) 50 caliber guns

The first USS Nitro (AE–2) was an ammunition ship of the United States Navy, commissioned from 1921 to 1945. The ship primarily operated in the Atlantic Ocean during World War II and supported the Normandy landings.

== History ==
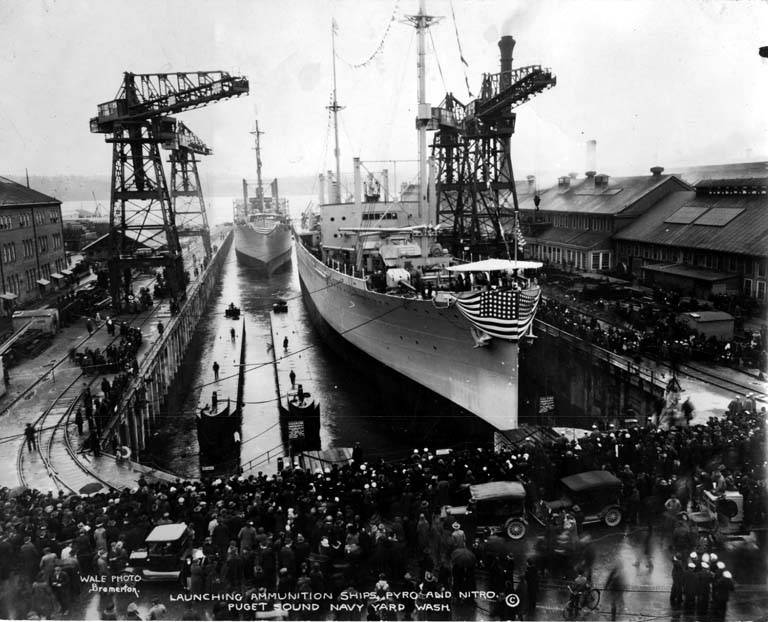
Launching of the Nitro (furthest from camera) and Pyro on 16 December 1919

The Nitro was laid down on 19 March 1919 by Puget Sound Navy Yard and launched 16 December 1919, sponsored by Mrs. Henry Suzalo. A sister ship, the USS Pyro (AE-1), was launched the same day. The Nitro was commissioned on 1 April 1921.

Carrying explosives and ammunition for the Battle Fleet, Nitro averaged three cruises yearly between the East Coast and West Coast by way of the Caribbean and Panama Canal. In addition, she made five voyages from the west coast to Pearl Harbor, seven to Manila, and one to Shanghai, as well as carrying men, ammunition and supplies to Marines in Nicaragua from 1928 to 1930. The ship was specially built to refrigerate and carry explosives and ammunition. Additionally, Nitro was "configured to accommodate 10 officer and 250 enlisted passengers".

=== McCain command ===
John S. McCain Sr. became commanding officer of the Nitro in June 1931, joining the ship in Hingham Bay on June 9. When McCain's son "Jack" eloped with Roberta McCain (parents of Senator John McCain) in 1933 in Tijuana, Captain McCain was able to attend given that Nitro was docked in San Diego at the time. McCain ended his command on 31 May 1932.

=== World War II ===
With Norfolk her home port at the beginning of World War II, the veteran ammunition ship carried ammunition to the Caribbean bases and twice to Recife, Brazil, base for the South Atlantic patrols, until she sailed 20 April 1944 for Belfast, Northern Ireland, with ammunition for the invasion of Europe. She operated from Belfast, Plymouth, and Roseneath, Scotland, supplying battleships with the heavy projectiles fired during the Normandy landings.

On 25 July 1944, Nitro arrived in Mers-el-Kebir, Algeria, for similar duty in the invasion of southern France, serving there and at Algiers and Corsica until 28 September, when she sailed for the Panama Canal and Pearl Harbor. After loading ammunition, she sailed for Ulithi arriving 1 December. Here she armed ships engaged in the Philippines, Iwo Jima, and Okinawa campaigns through 20 May 1945, when she sailed for local cargo and rearming operations in the Philippines.

=== Late history ===
Nitro returned to Puget Sound 15 August, repaired at Portland, Oregon, then sailed for the Panama Canal and Norfolk, arriving 28 October to decommission 30 November. Transferred to the Maritime Commission 30 March 1948, Nitro was sold to National Bulk Carriers of New York City on 19 September 1949.

== Awards and honors ==
Nitro received one battle star for World War II service.
