= USS Alaska (ID-3035) =

Minesweeper of the United States Navy

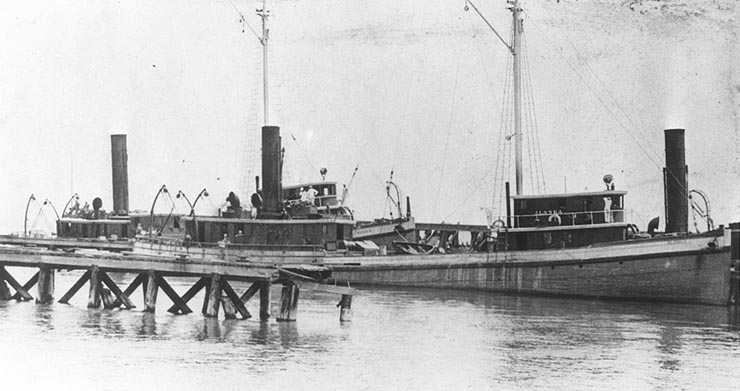
- SS Alaska prior to her U.S. Navy service.

History

United States
- Name: USS Alaska
- Namesake: Previous name retained
- Completed: 1881
- Acquired: 18 September 1918
- Commissioned: 18 September 1918
- Stricken: 10 January 1919
- Fate: Returned to owner 10 January 1919
- Notes: In commercial service 1881–1918 and from 1919

General characteristics
- Type: Minesweeper
- Tonnage: 229 gross register tons
- Length: 141 ft 9 in (43.21 m)
- Beam: 21 ft 0 in (6.40 m)
- Draft: 10 ft 6 in (3.20 m) (aft)
- Propulsion: Steam engine
- Speed: 10 knots
- Complement: 27

USS Alaska (ID-3035) was a minesweeper that served in the United States Navy from 1918 to 1919.

Alaska was built as a steam-powered commercial fishing trawler in 1881 at Boothbay, Maine. The U.S. Navy chartered her for World War I service from the Fisheries Products Company of Wilmington, North Carolina, on 18 September 1918. She was assigned the naval registry Identification Number (Id. No.) 3035 and commissioned the same day as USS Alaska at Charleston Navy Yard at Charleston, South Carolina.

Converted for service as a minesweeper, Alaska served in the Charleston area for the remainder of World War I and briefly thereafter as a minesweeper and patrol vessel.

The U.S. Navy returned Alaska to the Fisheries Products Company on 10 January 1919, and her name was stricken from the Navy Directory that same day.
