= USS Groton (SSBN-828) =

Submarine of the United States

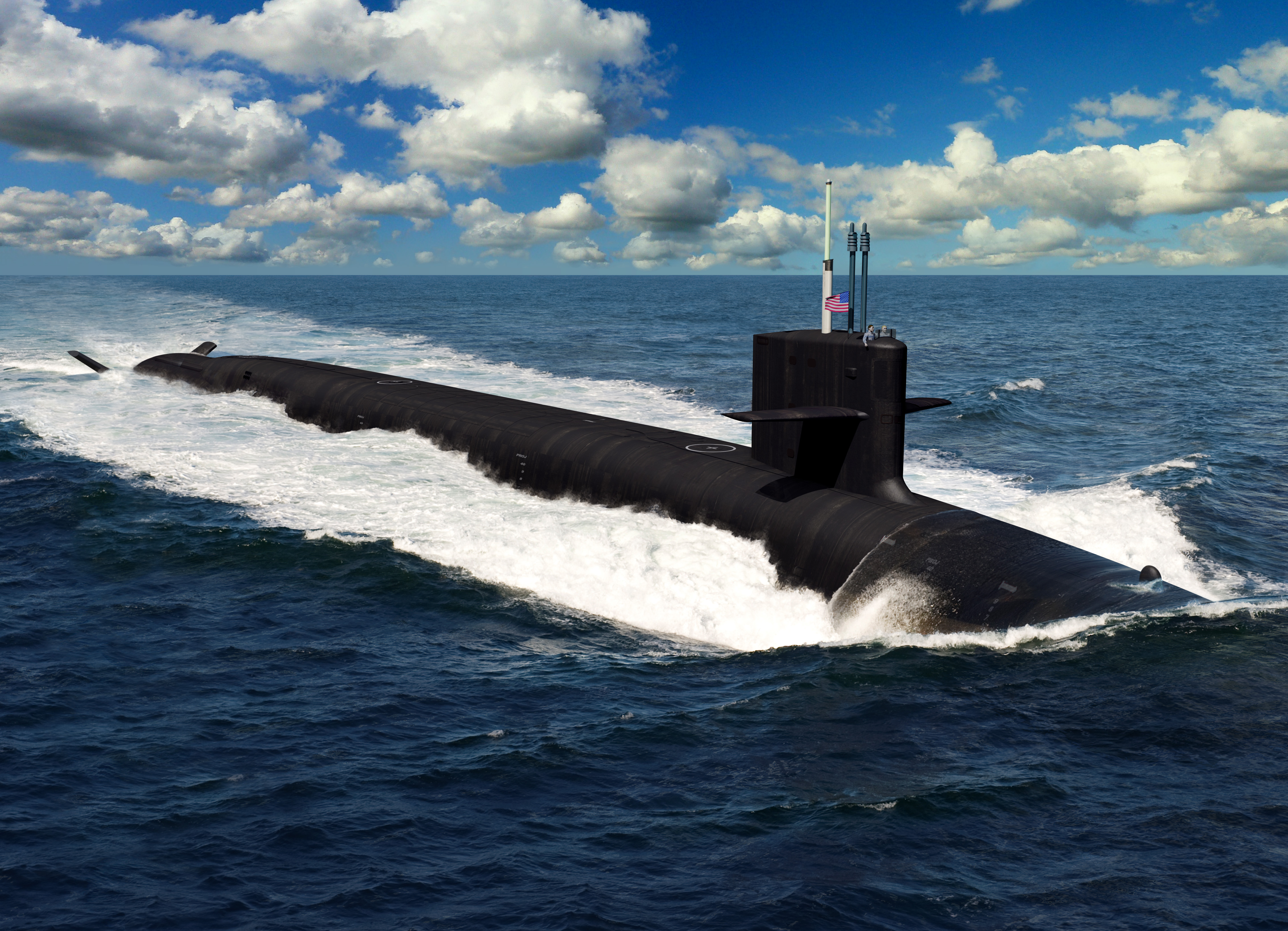
- Artistic concept of the Columbia-class made in 2019

History

United States
- Name: Groton
- Namesake: Groton, Connecticut
- Builder: General Dynamics Electric Boat
- Status: Announced

General characteristics
- Class & type: Columbia-class submarine
- Displacement: 20,810 long tons (21,140 t) (submerged)
- Length: 171 metres (561 ft)
- Beam: 13 metres (43 ft)
- Propulsion: Turbo-electric drive, pump-jet
- Range: Unlimited
- Complement: 155
- Armament: 16 × Trident II ICBMs; Torpedo tubes

USS Groton (SSBN-828) will be the third Columbia-class ballistic missile submarine (SSBN) of the United States Navy. Alongside her sister ships, she will replace the aging Ohio-class SSBN as part of the American nuclear triad. Groton was named after Groton, Connecticut, nicknamed the "submarine capital of the world" due to it hosting Naval Submarine Base New London and historically serving as a center of US submarine development. When she was named in 2025, the boat had not yet been ordered due to a disagreement between the Navy and builder General Dynamics Electric Boat over the cost.
