= USS Saint Croix =

1944 Haskell-class attack transport

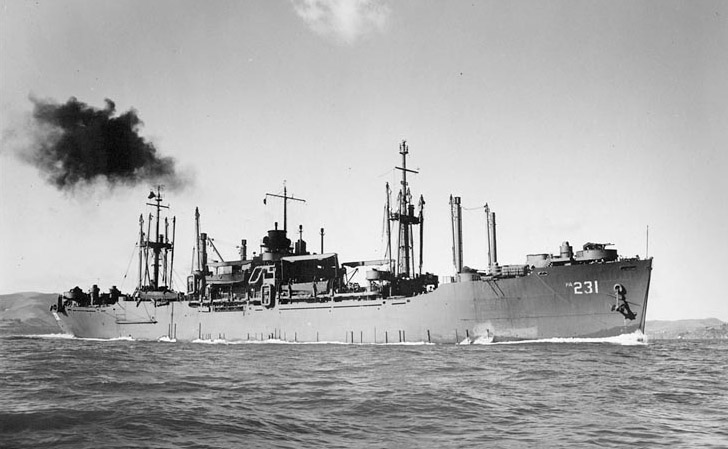
- USS Saint Croix

History

United States
- Name: USS Saint Croix
- Namesake: St. Croix County, Wisconsin
- Builder: Kaiser Shipyards, Vancouver, Washington
- Laid down: 25 September 1944
- Launched: 9 November 1944
- Commissioned: 1 December 1944
- Decommissioned: 7 April 1947
- Reclassified: LPA-231, 1 January 1969
- Stricken: 23 April 1947
- Fate: Sold for scrap, November 1979

General characteristics
- Class & type: Haskell-class attack transport
- Displacement: 14,837 long tons (15,075 t) full
- Length: 455 ft (139 m)
- Beam: 62 ft (19 m)
- Draft: 24 ft (7.3 m)
- Speed: 17 knots (31 km/h; 20 mph)
- Boats & landing craft carried: 2 × LCM; 12 × LCVP; 3 × LCPU
- Troops: 1,562
- Complement: 536
- Armament: 1 × 5"/38 caliber guns; 12 × 40 mm gun; 10 × 20 mm guns

USS Saint Croix (APA-231), was a Haskell-class attack transport of the United States Navy, able to carry 1,500 troops and their combat equipment, and to land them on a hostile shore using the ship's own landing craft.

The ship was built by the Kaiser Shipyard in Vancouver, Washington, and launched on 9 November 1944, sponsored by Mrs. Walter E. Hanawalt, and was accepted by the Navy and commissioned on 1 December 1944.

== Service history ==
Following a shakedown cruise off the California coast, Saint Croix departed San Diego on 31 January 1945, bound for the South Pacific. She reached Guadalcanal, Solomon Islands, on 16 February; then carried military passengers and equipment between Guadalcanal and the Florida Islands until 18 March.

She next sailed to New Caledonia, via the New Hebrides, and reached Nouméa on 26 March. On 3 May, Saint Croix sailed for the Philippines with Army troops that she landed near Tarragona, Leyte, on 16 May for mop-up operations. She then made three trips to New Guinea to bring more troops, debarking at Manila on 17 June, and at San Fernando on 14 July and 8 August.

The Saint Croix was at Manila when hostilities ended. She embarked Army occupation units at Manila and carried them to Japan, arriving at Yokohama on 13 September. Next, she loaded marines at Guam in late September and delivered them to Tsingtao, China, on 11 October as part of Operation Beleaguer. She then sailed to Hai Phong, Indochina (via Manila), to embark Chinese troops for passage to Kaohsiung, Formosa with USS Napa.

Back in Manila on 21 November, she embarked troops, and delivered them to San Francisco on 16 December.

Saint Croix then participated in "Operation Crossroads," the first peacetime testing of the atomic bomb: she left the west coast in February 1946 and served as an advance station ship for the operation, which exploded nuclear devices at Bikini Atoll on 1 July and 25 July. While at Bikini the ship was the home of the 53rd Naval Construction Battalion.

The Saint Croix returned the Seabees to Port Hueneme in August 1946 where the battalion was decommissioned and, except for a voyage to Pearl Harbor in January 1947, remained there until she was decommissioned on 7 April 1947. She then transferred to the Maritime Commission and was placed in the National Defense Reserve Fleet at Suisun Bay, California. The ex-Saint Croix was sold for scrap in late 1979.
