= USS Virginia (SP-746) =

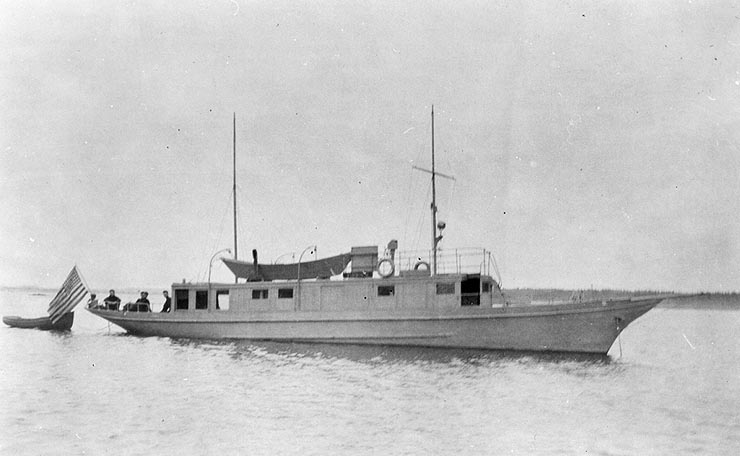
- USS Virginia (SP-746)

History

United States
- Name: USS Virginia
- Laid down: 1906
- Acquired: by lease, 13 July 1917
- Commissioned: 13 July 1917
- Decommissioned: 28 January 1919
- Stricken: 28 January 1919
- Fate: Returned to owner, 28 January 1919

General characteristics
- Type: Motor boat
- Tonnage: 26 long tons (26 t)
- Length: 61 ft 6 in (18.75 m)
- Beam: 10 ft 4 in (3.15 m)
- Draft: 3 ft 6 in (1.07 m)
- Speed: 15 knots (28 km/h; 17 mph)
- Complement: 6
- Armament: 1 × machine gun

USS Virginia (hull number SP-746) was a motor boat in the United States Navy, the seventh U.S. Navy vessel named for the Commonwealth of Virginia.

Virginia was built in 1906 at City Island in Bronx, New York. It was used by the Maine lobster warden, and was acquired by the Navy on 13 July 1917 under free lease from the state of Maine.

Though officially designated SP-746 on the Naval Register, Virginia retained her name informally while in naval service. The Navy Directory for 1918 lists her as Virginia (SP-746) and indicates that she was assigned to the 1st Naval District. The vessel conducted patrols out of the section base located at Machias, Maine.

She served the Navy until she was returned to her owner on 28 January 1919 when her name was struck from the Navy List.
