= USS Columbia (SSN-771) =

Los Angeles-class nuclear-powered attack submarine of the US Navy

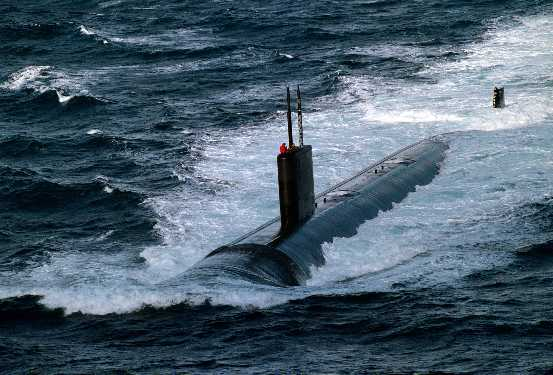

History

United States
- Name: USS Columbia
- Namesake: Cities of Columbia, South Carolina, Columbia, Missouri, and Columbia, Illinois
- Awarded: 14 December 1988
- Builder: General Dynamics Electric Boat
- Laid down: 21 April 1993
- Launched: 24 September 1994
- Sponsored by: Hillary Clinton
- Christened: 24 September 1994
- Completed: 24 September 1994
- Commissioned: 9 October 1995
- Home port: Naval Station Pearl Harbor
- Motto: Preserving Freedom On The Seas
- Status: in active service
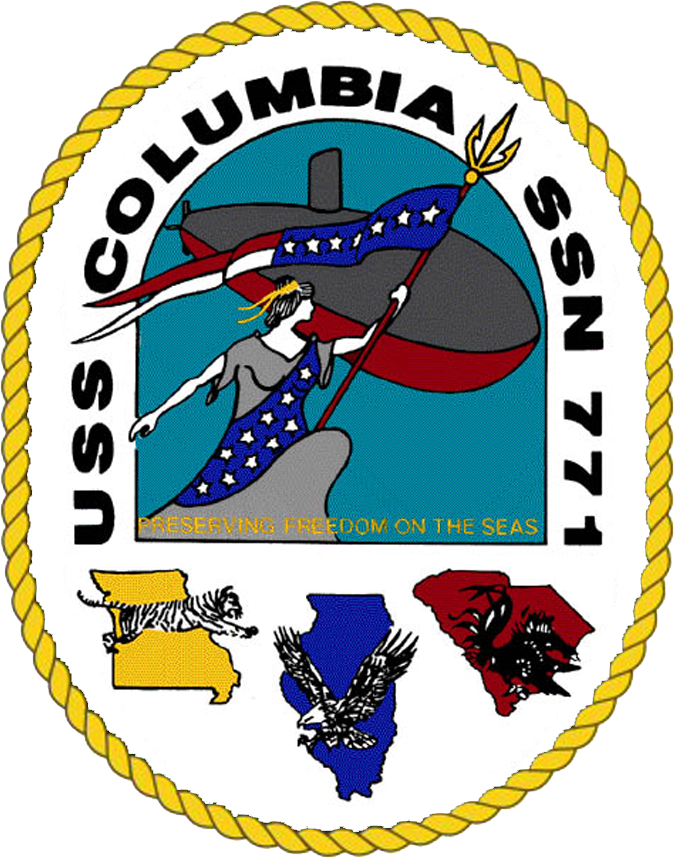
- Badge

General characteristics
- Class & type: Los Angeles-class submarine
- Displacement: 6,000 long tons (6,096 t) light; 6,927 long tons (7,038 t) full; 927 long tons (942 t) dead
- Length: 110.3 m (361 ft 11 in)
- Beam: 10 m (32 ft 10 in)
- Draft: 9.4 m (30 ft 10 in)
- Propulsion: 1 × S6G PWR nuclear reactor with D2W core (165 MW), HEU 93.5%; 2 × steam turbines (33,500) shp; 1 × shaft; 1 × secondary propulsion motor 325 hp (242 kW)
- Speed: Surface: About 15 knots. Submerged: About 32 knots.
- Complement: 12 officers, 110 men
- Armament: 4 × 21 in (533 mm) torpedo tubes; 12 x Vertical Launch Missile Tubes

USS Columbia (SSN-771) is the 21st flight III, or Improved (688i) Los Angeles-class attack submarine of the United States Navy. Commissioned in 1995, the submarine is assigned to Submarine Squadron 7 and homeported in Joint Base Pearl Harbor-Hickam.

Columbia is the eighth U.S. warship to bear the name, though the first to be named for three cities: Columbia, Illinois, Columbia, Missouri and Columbia, South Carolina.

The contract to build Columbia was awarded to the Electric Boat Division of General Dynamics Corporation in Groton, Connecticut, on 14 December 1988 and her keel was laid down on 21 April 1993. She was the 33rd Los Angeles-class boat built by Electric Boat, and was launched on 24 September 1994 with the slide down a 1,300-foot wooden ramp, the last American submarine to do so, giving her the title of "The Last Slider". Columbia was sponsored by Hillary Clinton, and commissioned on 9 October 1995.

== Service history ==
From March to May 1999, Columbia operated off the California coast, participating in exercises and making port visits.

In 2011, the submarine deployed to the Western Pacific Ocean (WestPac), including a port visit at Yokosuka, Japan.

In May 2014, Columbia left on another western Pacific deployment, again stopping in Yokosuka on 5 November and returning to her homeport of Joint Base Pearl Harbor-Hickam on 21 November.

In 2016, Columbia deployed on a six-month patrol in the western Pacific, making port visits at Yokosuka and Sasebo, Japan, and Guam.

In 2018, the sub made another WestPac deployment, stopping at Yokosuka in May.

In October 2018, the submarine began a mid-life overhaul at Pearl Harbor Naval Shipyard and Intermediate Maintenance Facility. She left dry dock on 16 July 2020 and returned to the Navy on 17 May 2021.

In September 2021, Columbia participated in the 62nd annual UNITAS exercise off South America.

=== 2019 shooting ===
On 4 December 2019, while Columbia was in dry dock, a crew member on guard duty shot and killed two civilian employees and injured another before shooting and killing himself. Machinist's Mate Auxiliary Fireman Gabriel Romero, 22, used duty weapons issued to him as a member of the submarine's Topside Roving Patrol. Later investigation by the Navy determined that Romero was "likely unfit" for service on a submarine and that officers and senior enlisted sailors aboard Columbia had failed to recognize and coordinate action on his deteriorating mental state.

== Awards ==
In July 2015, the ship was awarded the Arleigh Burke Fleet Trophy, as the Pacific Fleet ship that improved the most in the previous year, based on the Battle Efficiency Competition.

== Future U.S. submarine of the name ==
On 25 July 2016, Navy Secretary Ray Mabus announced that the lead ship of the planned Columbia class of ballistic missile submarines would also be named Columbia (SSBN-826), after the District of Columbia. This raised the possibility that the attack sub Columbia might still be in active service when the new ballistic missile sub was commissioned in 2031, although the attack sub would be 37 years old by that point. As of 2022, 36 Los Angeles-class boats have been retired, and only three were in service longer than 37 years.

On 3 June 2022, the Navy announced that the new sub would be named USS District of Columbia to eliminate the possibility that two ships in commission might bear the same name, which is forbidden by federal law.
