= USS Pyro =

Two ships of the United States Navy have been named USS Pyro.

- USS Pyro (AE-1), the lead ship of the Pyro-class ammunition ships was commissioned 10 August 1920 and decommissioned 10 September 1924. She was later recommissioned 1 July 1939, decommissioned 12 June 1946, and scrapped circa 1950 in California.
- USS Pyro (AE-24), a Nitro-class ammunition ship was commissioned 24 July 1959, decommissioned 31 May 1994 and scrapped in 2012 in New Orleans
