= USS Comfort =

USS Comfort may refer to the following ships operated by the United States:

- USS Comfort (AH-3), a hospital ship, was acquired in 1917 and served until 1921
- USS Comfort (AH-6), the lead ship of the Comfort-class hospital ship, which served from 1944 until 1946
- USNS Comfort (T-AH-20), a Mercy-class hospital ship, which began its service in 1987
