= USNS Puerto Rico =

Spearhead-class expeditionary fast transport

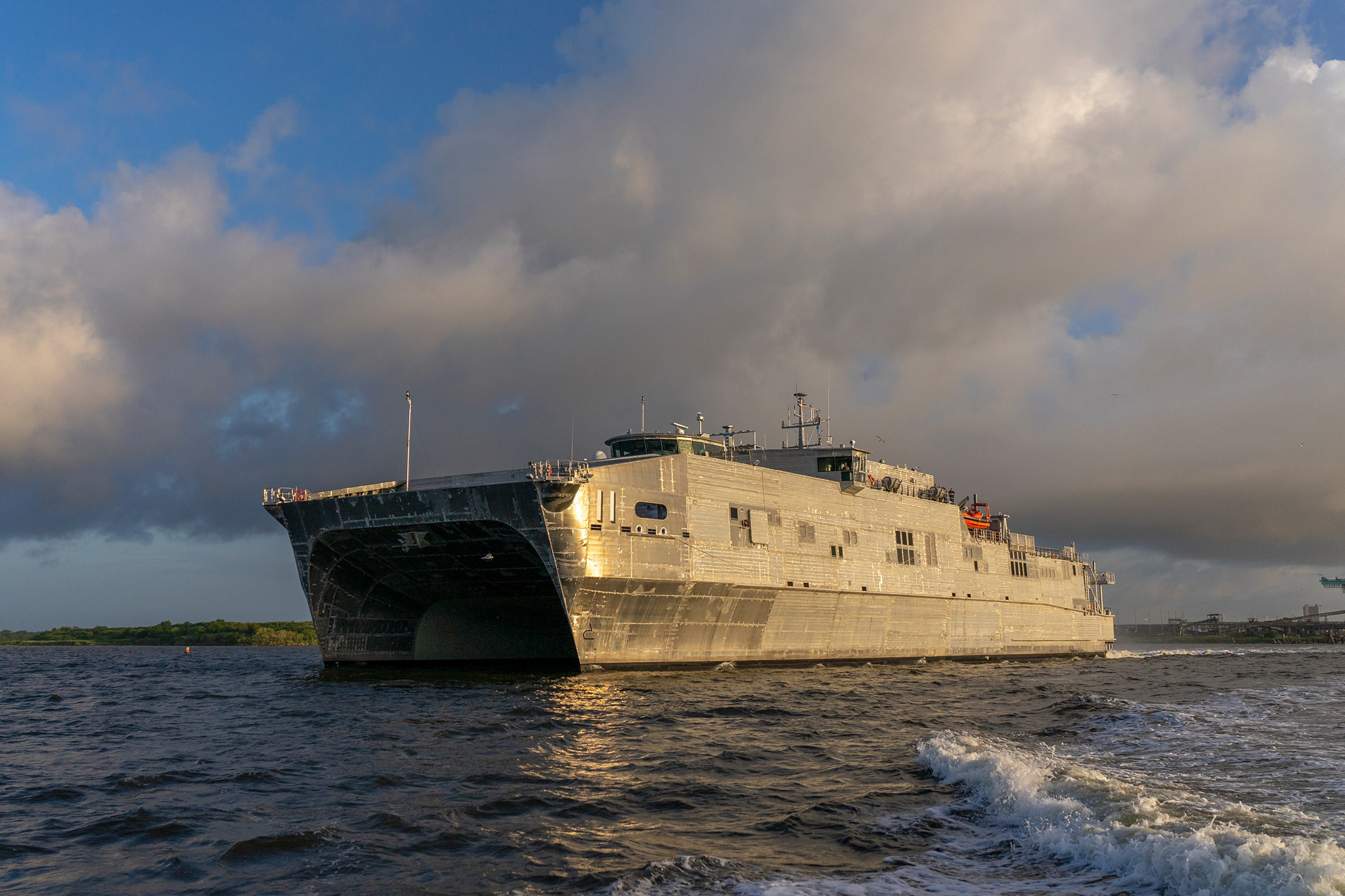
- USNS Puerto Rico returning from her sea trial on 22 August 2019

History

United States
- Name: Puerto Rico
- Namesake: Puerto Rico
- Operator: Military Sealift Command
- Awarded: 15 September 2016
- Builder: Austal USA
- Laid down: 9 August 2018
- Launched: 13 November 2018
- Sponsored by: Sonia Sotomayor
- Christened: 10 November 2018
- In service: 10 December 2019
- Identification: IMO number: 9827229; MMSI number: 368926094; Callsign: NPRI; Hull number: T-EPF-11
- Motto: Excelencia, Perseverancia, Fuerza; (Excellence, Perseverance, Vigor)
- Status: Active
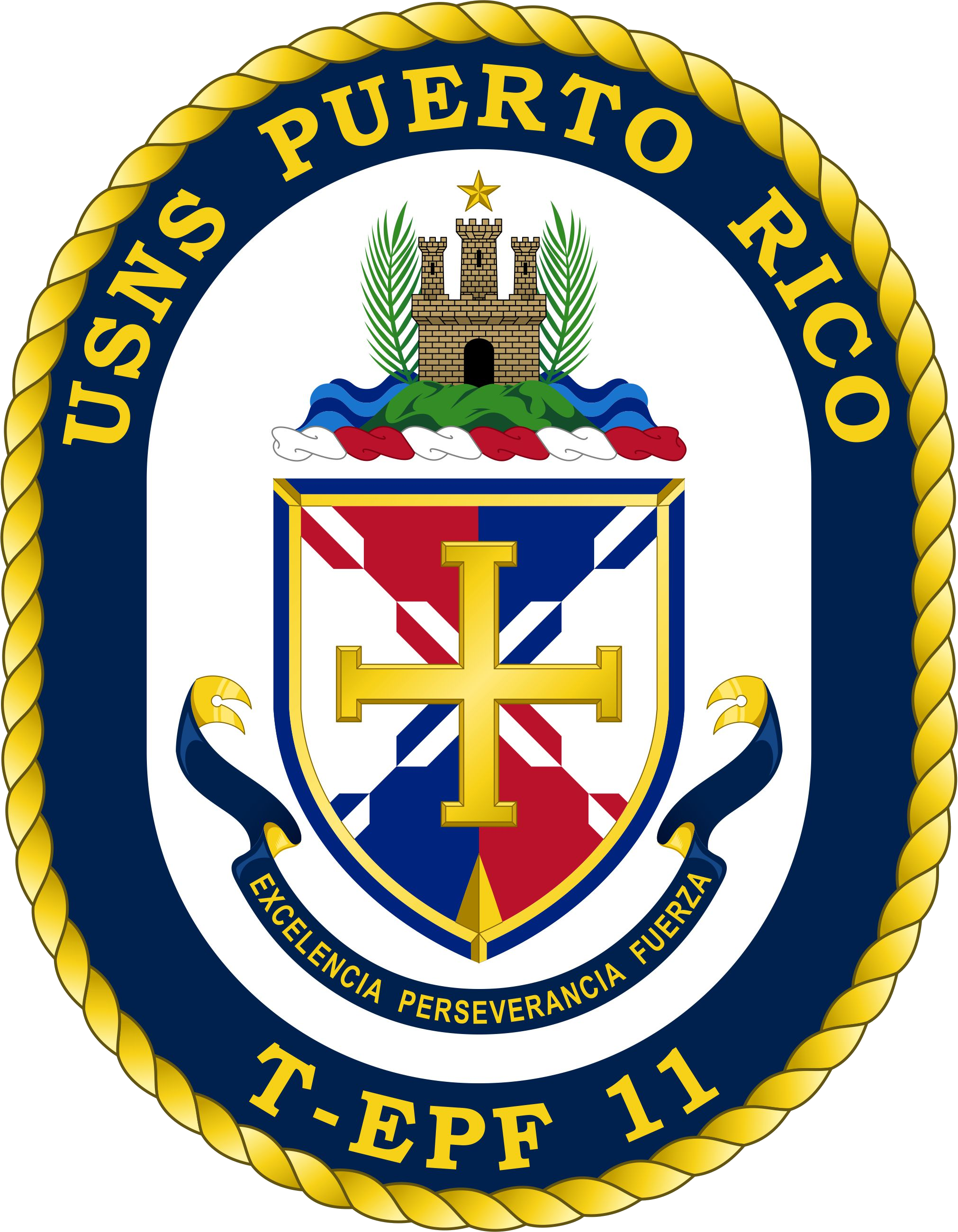
- Badge

General characteristics
- Class & type: Spearhead-class expeditionary fast transport
- Length: 103.0 m (337 ft 11 in)
- Beam: 28.5 m (93 ft 6 in)
- Draft: 3.83 m (12 ft 7 in)
- Propulsion: 4 × MTU 20V8000 M71L diesel engines; 4 × ZF 60000NR2H reduction gears
- Speed: 43 knots (80 km/h; 49 mph)
- Troops: 312
- Crew: Capacity of 41, 22 in normal service
- Aviation facilities: Landing pad for medium helicopter

USNS Puerto Rico (T-EPF-11) is the eleventh Spearhead-class expeditionary fast transport and currently in service with the United States Navy's Military Sealift Command.

Puerto Rico was christened on 10 November 2018.
