= USS Wisconsin (SSBN-827) =

Future U.S. Columbia-class ballistic missile submarine

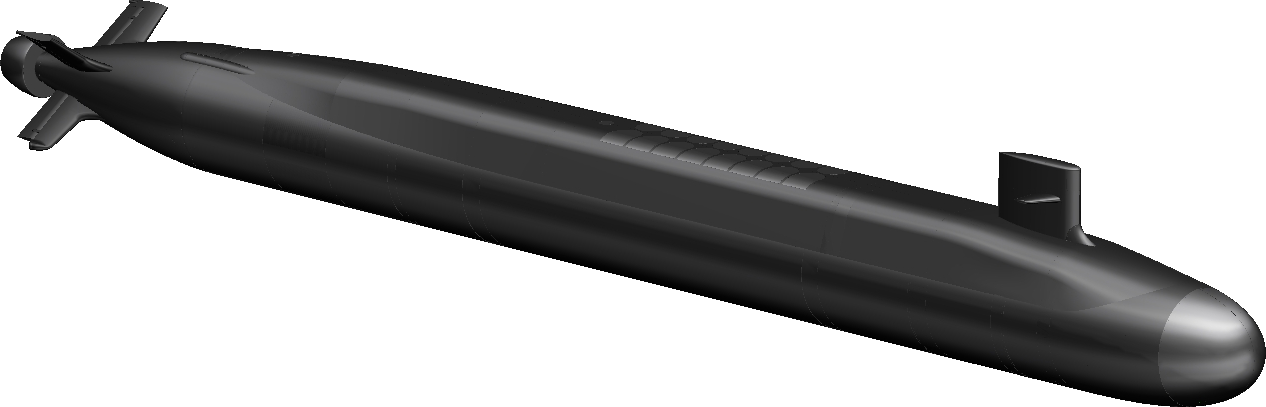
- Graphic artist concept (2012)

History

United States
- Name: Wisconsin
- Namesake: The state of Wisconsin
- Laid down: August 27, 2025

General characteristics
- Class & type: Columbia-class submarine
- Type: Ballistic missile submarine (SSBN)
- Installed power: Nuclear reactor

USS Wisconsin (SSBN-827) will be the second Columbia-class ballistic missile submarine. She is the third vessel of the United States Navy to be named after the state of Wisconsin. The previous name holder was the Iowa-class battleship USS Wisconsin (BB-64), which decommissioned in 1991 and stricken from the Naval Vessel Register in 2006.

== Naming and construction ==
On October 28, 2020, Secretary of the Navy Kenneth J. Braithwaite announced that the second Columbia-class submarine would bear the name Wisconsin. This came from a bipartisan push from U.S. Senators Tammy Baldwin and Ron Johnson, who cited Wisconsin's history of shipbuilding as a reason to name a new submarine after the state. Construction of the Wisconsin is scheduled for fiscal year 2024.

The Columbia-class submarines are set to replace the Ohio-class ballistic missile submarine. Construction of the lead boat USS District of Columbia (SSBN-826) officially began on October 1, 2020. She is scheduled to enter service in 2031.
