= USS District of Columbia =

Submarine of the United States

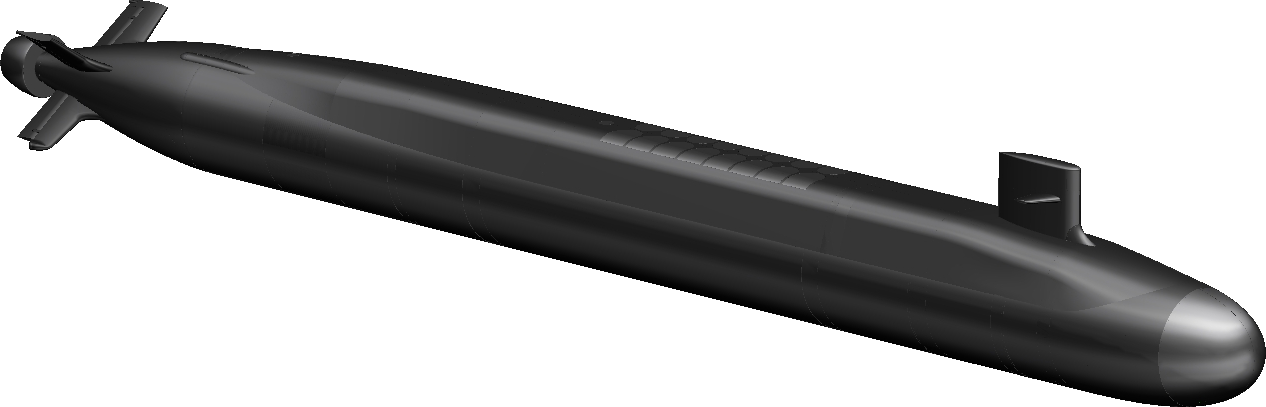
- Graphic artist concept (2012)

History

United States
- Name: District of Columbia
- Namesake: District of Columbia
- Builder: General Dynamics Electric Boat
- Laid down: 4 June 2022
- Sponsored by: Eleanor Holmes Norton and Muriel Bowser
- Motto: Justitia Omnibus (Justice For All)
- Status: Under construction
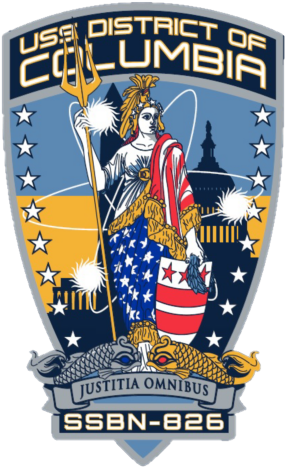
- Badge

General characteristics
- Class & type: Columbia-class submarine
- Displacement: 20,810 long tons (21,140 t) (submerged)
- Length: 171 metres (561 ft)
- Beam: 13 metres (43 ft)
- Propulsion: Turbo-electric drive, pump-jet
- Range: Unlimited
- Complement: 155
- Armament: 16 × Trident D5

USS District of Columbia (SSBN-826) will be the lead boat of the United States Navy's Columbia-class ballistic missile submarines and the Navy's first vessel to be named for the District of Columbia.

On 25 July 2016, U.S. Navy Secretary Ray Mabus announced that the new submarine would be named USS Columbia. The Navy already had a USS Columbia (SSN-771), an attack submarine commissioned in 1995, which was expected to retire before the missile submarine was commissioned. But after the Navy decided to prolong the attack sub's service, the new submarine's name was changed to avoid having two active vessels with the same name. On 3 June 2022, the Navy announced that the new submarine would be named USS District of Columbia.

In 2021, construction began on District of Columbia at General Dynamics' Electric Boat facility in Quonset Point, Rhode Island. A keel laying ceremony was held at the shipyard on 4 June 2022. Completion of District of Columbia is scheduled for 2030, followed by her entry into service in 2031.

USS District of Columbia has been assigned to Submarine Squadron 16.

== Mission ==
The 12 ballistic missile submarines of the Columbia class will perform deterrent patrols, the naval leg of the U.S. nuclear triad. They will replace the Ohio class, whose submarines are to be decommissioned, one per year, beginning in 2027. District of Columbia will replace an as-yet-unannounced Ohio.

== Design specification and parameters ==
In April 2014, the Navy completed a 300-page specification report for the Ohio Replacement Program submarines. There are 159 specifications including weapons, escape routes, fluid systems, hatches, doors, sea water systems, and a set length of 560 ft (170 m) (later confirmed in design specifications), partly to allow for sufficient volume inside the pressure hull.

Electric Boat designed the new class with help from Newport News Shipbuilding. Each submarine, beginning with District of Columbia, will have 16 missile tubes, each carrying one UGM-133 Trident II missile. The submarines will be 560 feet (170.7 m) long and 43 feet (13.1 m) in diameter, as long as the preceding Ohio-class design, and 1 foot (30 cm) larger in diameter. Each Columbia-class nuclear core is designed to last as long as the submarine is in service avoiding the need for nuclear refueling during the vessel's active service life.

== Costs and procurement ==
The design and technology development of the Columbia class is projected to cost $4.2 billion (fiscal 2010 dollars), although technology and components from the Ohio and Virginia classes are to be included where possible, to save money. The cost to build District of Columbia, the lead boat of the class, will be an estimated $6.2 billion (fiscal 2010 dollars). The Navy has a goal of reducing the average cost of the remaining 11 planned hulls in the class to $4.9 billion each (fiscal 2010 dollars). The total lifecycle cost of the entire class is estimated at $347 billion. The high cost of the submarines is expected to cut deeply into Navy shipbuilding. The Navy procured the first Columbia-class boat in FY2021. On 7 June 2021, the U.S. Navy Budget office announced that the total cost for the first submarine, District of Columbia, would reach $15.03 billion, but that also includes planning costs for the entire program.

== Implementation and construction ==
In March 2016, the U.S. Navy announced that General Dynamics Electric Boat was chosen as the prime contractor and lead design yard. Electric Boat will carry out the majority of the work, on all 12 submarines, including final assembly. All 18 Ohio-class submarines were built at Electric Boat as well. Huntington Ingalls Industries’ Newport News Shipbuilding will serve as the main subcontractor, participating in the design and construction and performing 22 to 23 percent of the required work. In late 2016, some 3,000 employees were involved, in Electric Boat alone, in the detailed design phase of the program, with the procurement for the first submarine established in 2021.

The first steel was cut in May 2019, with construction of the submarine officially begun in October 2020 and keel laying ceremony held in June 2022. Completion of District of Columbia is scheduled for 2030, followed by her entry into service in 2031. All 12 submarines are expected to be completed by 2042 and remain in service until 2085.

The ship faces persistent delays and, as of 2025, its delivery is projected to be delivered two years late in 2029. At the February 2026 WEST conference in San Diego, California, Rear Admiral Todd Weeks announced that construction was approximately 65% complete with delivery now targeted for 2028.

== Propulsion ==
=== Electric drive ===
District of Columbia will have an electric drive propulsion system that uses an electric motor to turn the propeller of a vessel. It is part of a wider (Integrated electric power) concept whose aim is to create an "all electric vessel". Electric drive should reduce the life-cycle cost of the submarine while at the same time reducing acoustic signature.

In 2014, Northrop Grumman was chosen as the prime designer and manufacturer of the turbine generator units. The turbines convert thermal energy in the steam into mechanical energy, and the generators convert that mechanical energy into electrical energy. The electrical energy is then used for powering onboard systems as well as for propulsion via electric motor.

== Weapons ==
=== Common missile compartment ===
In December 2008, General Dynamics Electric Boat Corporation was selected to design the Common Missile Compartment that will be used on the Columbia class. In 2012, the U.S. Navy announced plans for the class to share a common missile compartment (CMC) design with the Royal Navy's Dreadnought-class submarine. The CMC will house SLBMs in "quad packs".
