= Grayback =

Grayback or Greyback may refer to:

- Grayback (fish)
- Dowitcher, a wading bird
- An American duck, Aythya americana
- A Fictional character in the 2001 real time strategy game Battle Realms and its 2002 expansion pack Winter of the Wolf
- Greyback, an American Civil War Confederate currency
- USS Grayback, either of two US Navy submarines
