= USS Growler (SSG-577) =

US Navy submarine

Coordinates: 40.765110°N 73.999990°W

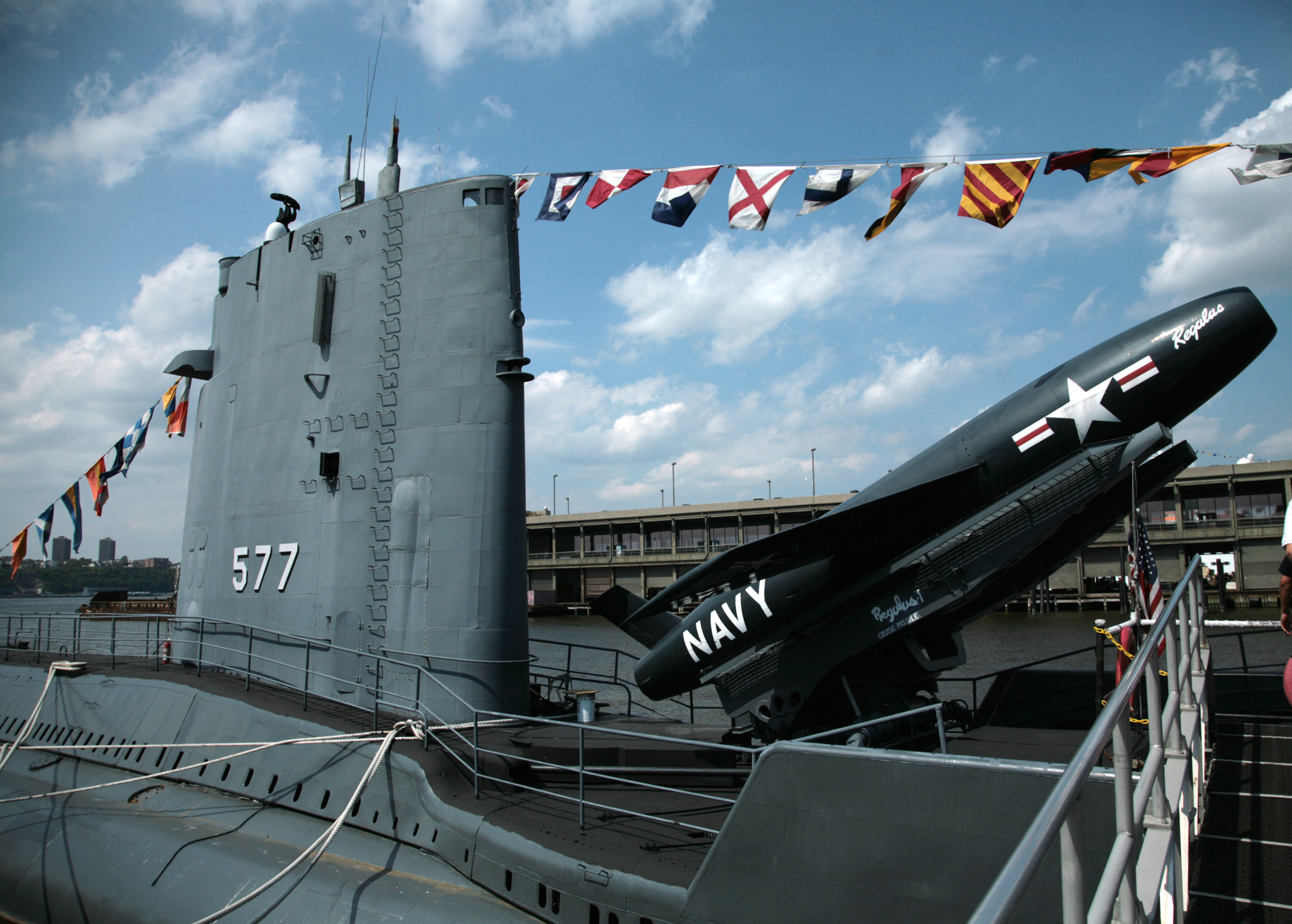
- USS Growler Regulus I missile aboard USS Growler at Pier 86 in New York, its museum ship home.

History

United States
- Name: Growler
- Namesake: Growler
- Ordered: 31 July 1954
- Builder: Portsmouth Naval Shipyard
- Laid down: 15 February 1955
- Launched: 5 April 1958
- Sponsored by: Mrs. Robert K. Byerts, widow of Commander Thomas B. Oakley, Jr.
- Commissioned: 30 August 1958
- Decommissioned: 25 May 1964
- Stricken: 1 August 1980
- Home port: Pearl Harbor, HI
- Status: Museum ship at the Intrepid Museum
- Badge

General characteristics USS Growler SSG-577
- Class & type: Grayback class submarine
- Displacement: 2,110 tons light, 3,550 tons full, 1,440 tons dead
- Length: 96.69 m (317 ft 3 in) overall, 96.3 m (316 ft) waterline
- Beam: 8.2 m (27 ft) extreme, 7.9 m (26 ft) waterline
- Draught: 5.7 m (19 ft)
- Propulsion: 3 Fairbanks-Morse Diesel engines, 2 Elliott electric motors
- Speed: 17 kn (20 mph; 31 km/h) surfaced, 12 kn (14 mph; 22 km/h) submerged
- Test depth: 712
- Complement: 9 officers, 11 chief petty officers, 68 enlisted men
- Armament: 2 × Regulus missile hangars (4 × Regulus I or 2 × Regulus II missiles); 6 × 21 inch (533 mm) torpedo tubes (4 bow, 2 stern); 16 × torpedoes (12 bow, 4 stern) Stern torpedoes anti-submarine only

USS Growler (SSG-577) was an early attempt by the U.S. Navy to field a cruise missile submarine that would provide a nuclear deterrent using its second series of cruise missiles. Built to deliver the Regulus I cruise missile, Growler is the second and final submarine of the Grayback class, fourth boat of the United States Navy to be named after the growler. Since Regulus I and Regulus II programs had problems, Growler and Grayback were the only two submarines built in this class as instead, the U.S. Navy veered its nuclear deterrence efforts into submarine launched ballistic missiles (SLBMs)—the Polaris missile program.

What makes Growler and her sister unusual was her nuclear armament, deployed on a conventional diesel-electric submarine. Her mission was to provide nuclear deterrent capability off the Pacific coast of the Soviet Union during peak years of the Cold War, from 1958 to 1964. Additionally, special forces missions were deployed from her torpedo tubes and nuclear hangar.

Decommissioned in 1964, she was put into service as a museum ship in 1988 as part of the Intrepid Museum in New York City.

== Construction and training ==
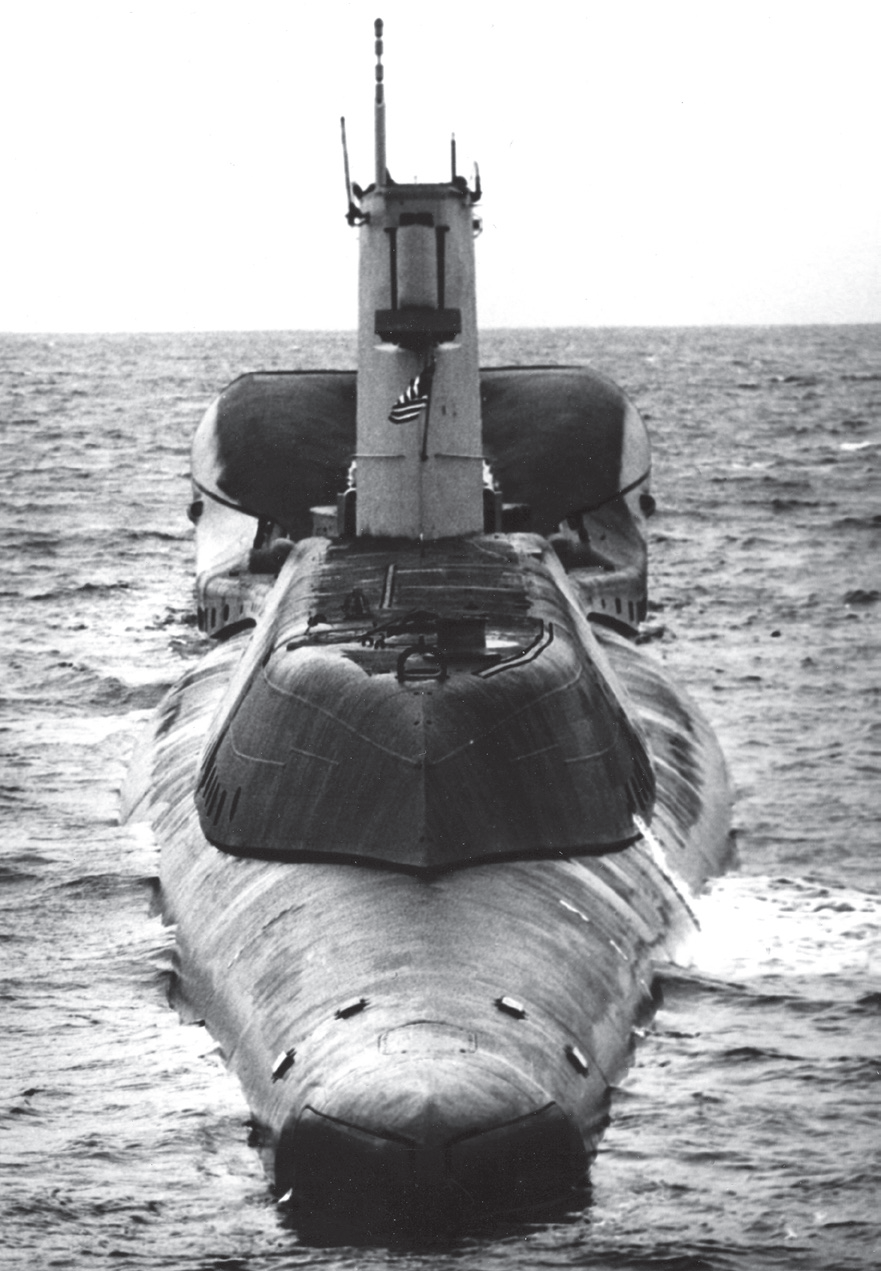
Aft view of USS Growler (SSG-577)

Growler was laid down on 15 February 1955 by the Portsmouth Naval Shipyard of Kittery, Maine. She was launched on 5 April 1958 sponsored by Mrs. Robert K. Byerts, widow of Commander Thomas B. Oakley, Jr. Growler commissioned at Portsmouth on 30 August 1958 with Lieutenant Commander Charles Priest, Jr., in command.

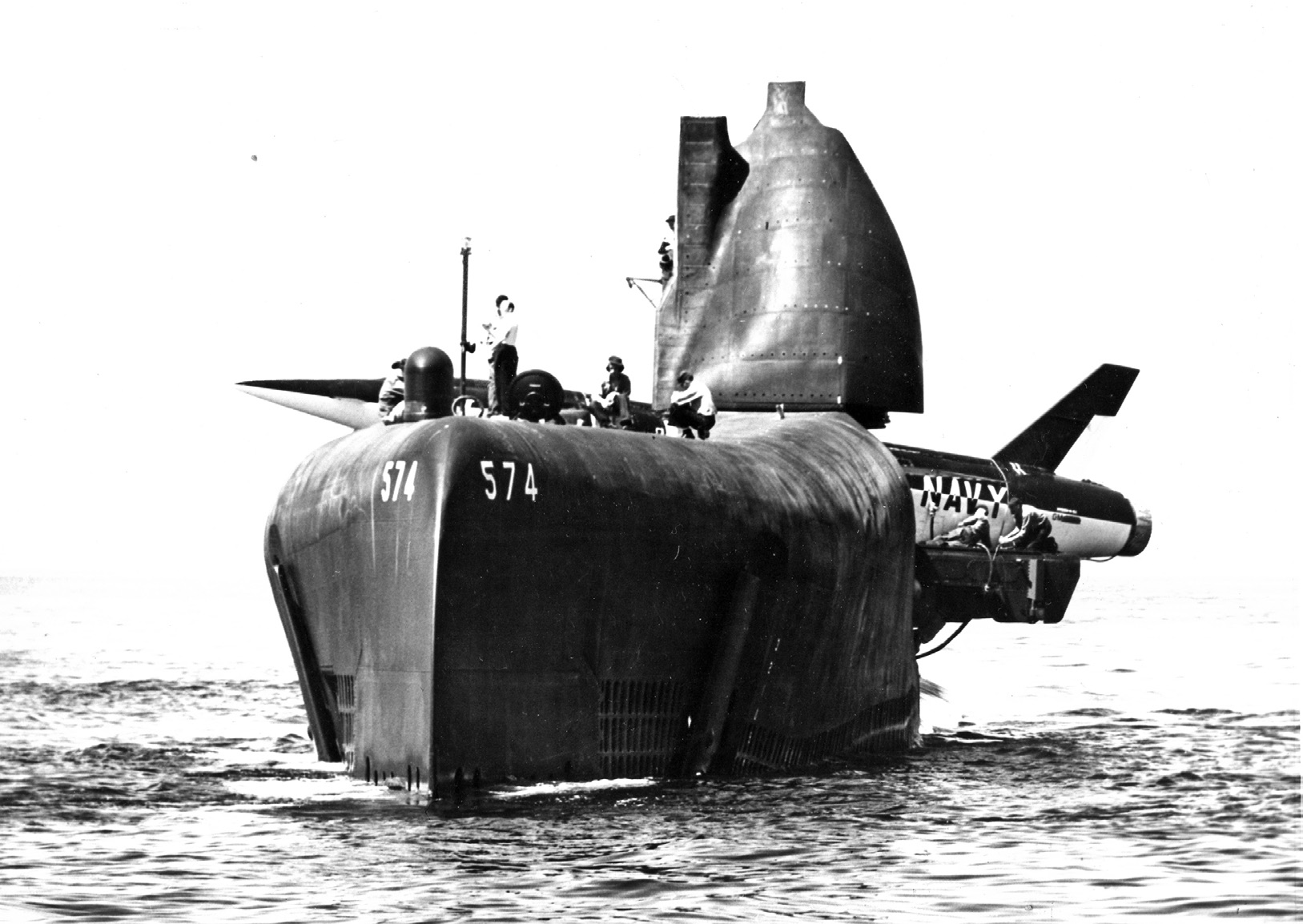
Grayback (SSG-574) with Regulus 2 missile.

After training exercises off the East Coast Growler sailed south for her shakedown cruise, arriving at the Roosevelt Roads Naval Station, Puerto Rico, on 19 February 1959. After a brief run back to Portsmouth, she returned to the Caribbean Sea in March to train in launching Regulus I and Regulus II nuclear cruise missiles, assisted by USS Runner, which was one of several submarines with Regulus guidance equipment. Growler returned to Portsmouth 19 April via Fort Lauderdale, Florida, and New London, Connecticut.

== Operational history ==
Growler then proceeded to the Pacific via Norfolk, Virginia, Key West, Florida, and the Panama Canal, putting in at Pearl Harbor on 7 September to serve as flagship of Submarine Division 12. At Pearl Harbor the guided missile sub participated in a variety of battle and torpedo exercises as well as missile practice before beginning her first Regulus Deterrent Mission. On this mission, which lasted from 12 March to 17 May 1960, Growler departed Hawaii with a full store of Regulus sea-to-surface missiles, armed with nuclear warheads, and patrolled under a strict cloak of secrecy. Their patrols could last two months or more at a stretch and required them to remain submerged for hours and even days—which is much less than the patrols of present-day nuclear-powered ballistic missile submarines, but was a strain for the crew of a much smaller diesel boat. It is traditional that the log entries for 00:00 (midnight) on New Year's Day be made in verse. On 1 January 1961, during Growler's second patrol, Lieutenant (j.g.) Bruce Felt wrote: "Not our idea of fun and good cheers/But doing our job to ensure many New Years."

According to the documentary "Regulus: The First Nuclear Missile Submarines", the primary target for Growler in the event of a nuclear exchange would be to eliminate the Soviet naval base at Petropavlovsk-Kamchatsky. The patrols made by Growler and her sisters represented the first ever deterrent patrols in the history of the submarine Navy, preceding those made by the Polaris missile submarines.

From May 1960 through December 1963, Growler made nine such deterrent mission patrols, the fourth of which terminated at Yokosuka, Japan, on 24 April 1962, as the Navy displayed one of its newest weapons.

== Decommissioning and fate ==
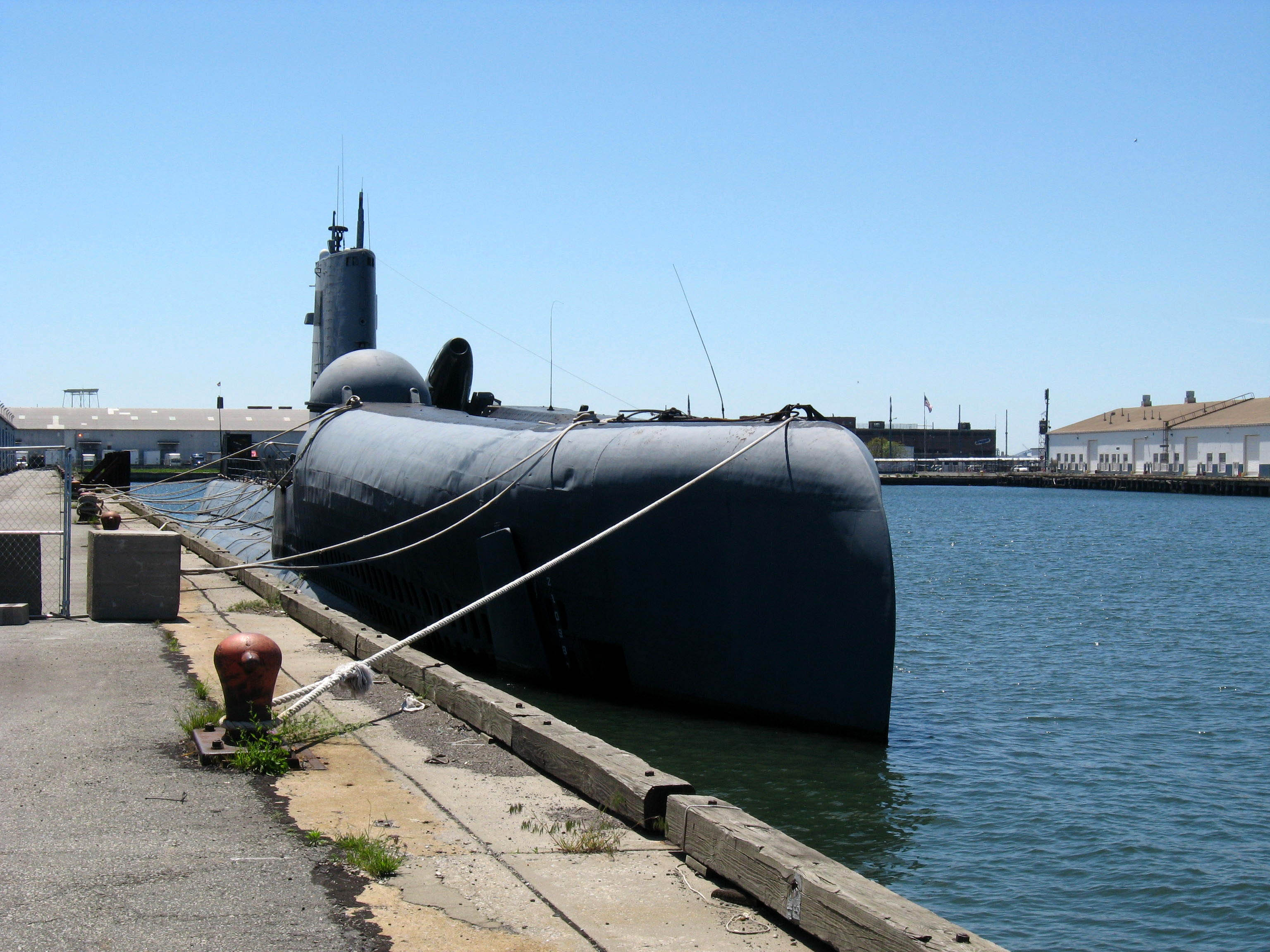
In Atlantic Basin, Brooklyn, 2008

Returning to Mare Island, California, Growler decommissioned 25 May 1964 and was placed in reserve. She was initially moved to the Inactive Fleet section in the Puget Sound Naval Shipyard in Bremerton, Washington, and was later relocated to the Philadelphia Naval Shipyard. She was stricken from the Naval Vessel Register on 1 August 1980 and was scheduled to be used as a torpedo target. However, on 8 August 1988, Congress awarded the hulk to Zachary Fisher, Chairman of the Intrepid Sea, Air & Space Museum in New York City.

Due to the renovations to the entire Intrepid Sea, Air & Space Museum complex, including USS Intrepid and Pier 86, Growler was towed to Brooklyn for repairs. Holes found rusted in the hull complicated matters and pushed repair costs past $1.5 million. Growler returned to Pier 86 in late February 2009, and was re-opened to the public on 21 May 2009, during the Intrepid museum "Fleet Week 2009" celebration.

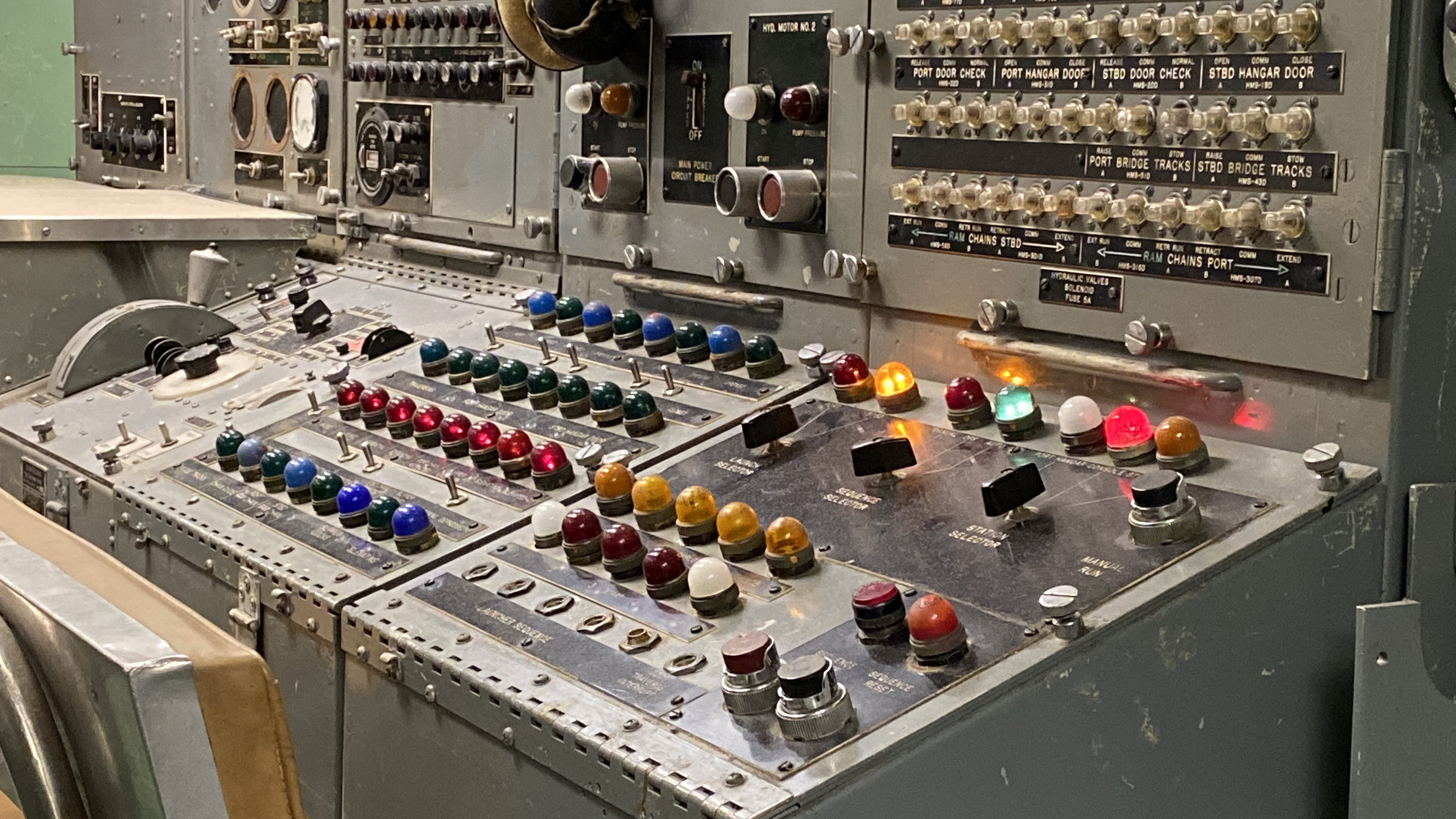
This once-classified control room is where crews aboard the USS Growler would configure and fire the Regulus I nuclear cruise missile.

== Museum ship ==
Growler is the only nuclear missile submarine available open to the public in the United States.

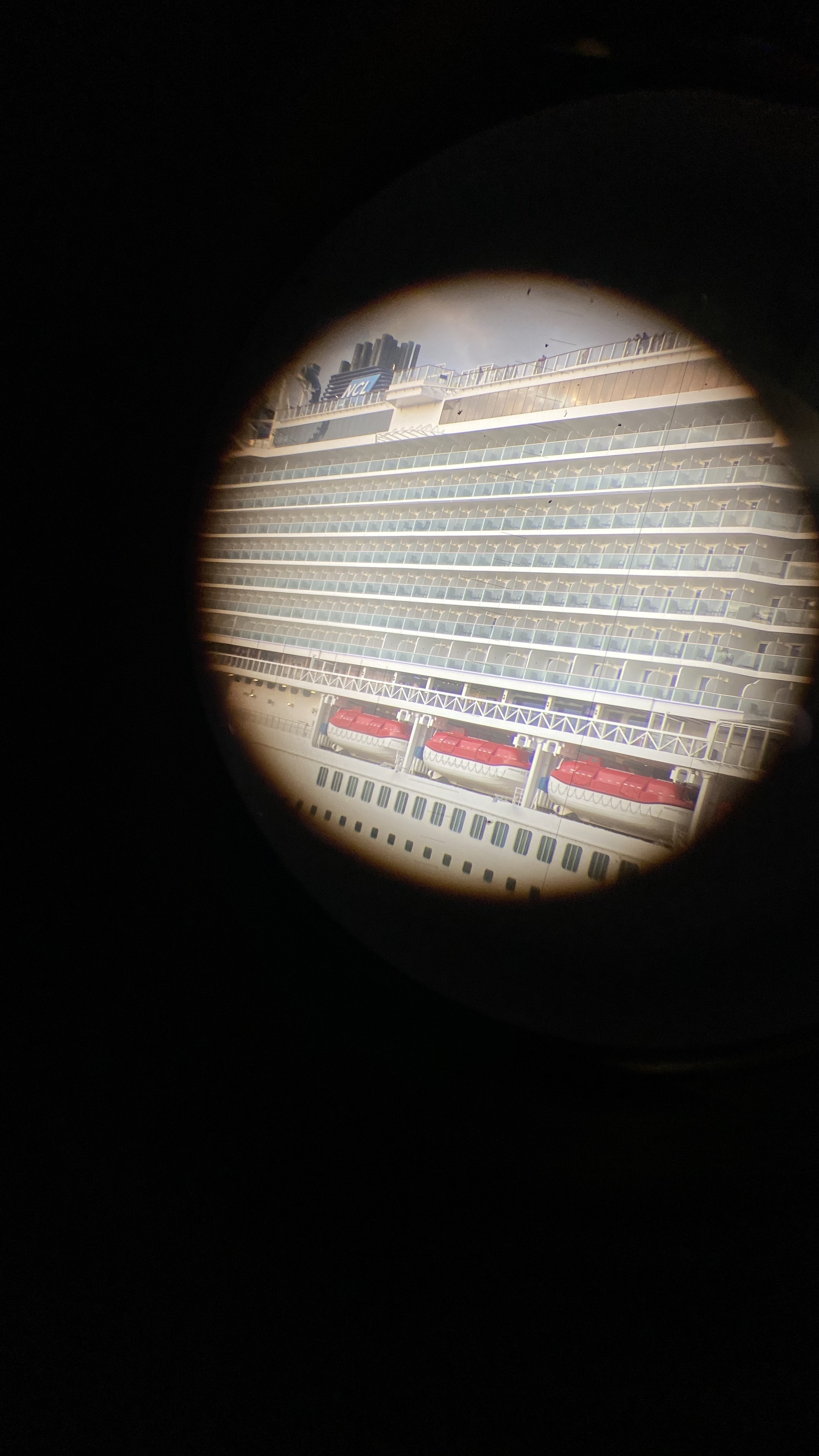
The attack periscope aboard the Growler still functions. Here, it's sighted the cruise ship Norwegian Bliss, docked next to it in New York City.

== Bibliography ==
- Gardiner, Robert. Conway's All the World's Fighting Ships 1947–1995, London: Conway Maritime Press, Ltd, 1995, pp. 609–610
