= SSM-N-2 Triton =

- Type: Cruise missile
- Place of origin: United States

Service history
- In service: In development 1946-1957

Production history
- Produced: Never tested or deployed; infobox data is for final 1957 design

Specifications
- Mass: 30,000 pounds (14,000 kg)
- Length: 47 feet 0 inches (14.33 m)
- Diameter: 4 feet 9 inches (1.45 m)
- Warhead: 2MT W27 thermonuclear warhead
- Engine: solid-fuel rocket boosters, liquid-fuel ramjet sustainer
- Operational range: 1,500 nautical miles (2,800 km)
- Flight ceiling: 80,000 feet (24,000 m)
- Maximum speed: Mach 3.5
- Guidance system: Astro-inertial or inertial + magnetic; infrared or active radar homing terminal guidance
- Launch platform: Surface combatants and submarines

The SSM-N-2 Triton was a supersonic nuclear land-attack cruise missile project for the United States Navy. It was in development from 1946 to 1957, but probably no prototypes were produced or tested. The Triton program was approved in September 1946, designated SSM-2 a year later, and redesignated SSM-N-2 in early 1948. A preliminary design was produced by 1950 as the XSSM-N-2, but was scaled down by 1955 and redesigned again in 1957. Triton was cancelled in 1957, probably as a result of the 1956 decision to focus the Navy's strategic weapons development on the Polaris submarine-launched ballistic missile. In any case, prototypes of the similar Regulus II missile had already flown, and Triton was redundant, offering only an increase in range from 1,000 to 1,500 nautical miles (1,900 to 2,800 km) , which Polaris was about to achieve along with many other advantages. Regulus II was itself cancelled in 1958, although testing of missiles already built continued for several years.

== Development history ==
Triton was approved by the US Navy in 1946 and a preliminary design was ready by 1950. The goal was to produce a supersonic land-attack nuclear cruise missile capable of being launched from the same platforms and equipment as the subsonic SSM-N-8 Regulus I, which were surface combatants, submarines, and aircraft carriers via launch rails or catapults. One reference cites Triton as an outgrowth of Operation Bumblebee, which produced the Navy's first production surface-to-air missiles, notably Talos, which had a ramjet sustainer like Triton.

An artist’s concept shows the first iteration of Triton with a long ramjet body, two mid-body stub wings, and four solid-fuel boosters clustered around a relatively large cruciform tail. The specifications were a 36,000-pound (16,000 kg) missile with a range of 2,000 nautical miles (3,700 km) at Mach 2.0 and a nuclear payload of 4,000 pounds (1,800 kg). Since Regulus I weighed under 14,000 pounds (6,400 kg), it was difficult to see how this version of Triton would be usable by the initial Regulus platforms. Even Regulus II, which occupied about twice the volume of Regulus I, weighed only 23,000 pounds (10,000 kg). A slimmer design for Triton was produced in 1955, at 27,300 pounds (12,400 kg) with a range of 1,200 nautical miles (2,200 km) and a nuclear payload of 1,500 pounds (680 kg). Nuclear warheads were rapidly getting smaller. This design was approved for further development, with initial operational capability expected by 1965. A 1957 redesign is described in the infobox, apparently a re-expansion to 30,000 pounds (14,000 kg) to achieve a 1,500-nautical-mile (2,800 km) range and a perhaps unrealistic speed of Mach 3.5. Triton was cancelled that same year in favor of Polaris, which proved to be a wildly successful system despite being produced on a "crash" timeline.

At a cost of $19.4 million in 1953 dollars, (equivalent to $233 million in 2025) Triton was a somewhat expensive failure. However, in 1950 it could not be foreseen that the turbojet-powered, supersonic Regulus II would be comparable to a ramjet-powered weapon in just six years, or that a solid-fueled ballistic missile (Polaris) would soon eclipse all of the Navy’s other strategic options, and that it could be developed and deployed by 1961.

=== Possible platforms ===
Sketch designs were prepared for surface ships and submarines to carry Triton. A submarine capable of carrying four Triton or Regulus II missiles or up to eight Regulus I missiles was sketched in 1956. One of the many proposals for modernizing the Iowa-class battleships came in 1955, featuring Talos surface-to-air missiles (SAMs) and one or two launchers for Regulus or Triton. The incomplete Kentucky was proposed for completion to this design. Another incomplete ship, the large cruiser Hawaii, was also proposed for various conversions, including a 1947 sketch with 12 launchers for copies of the V-2 short-range ballistic missile and six Triton launchers (though one reference states these launchers were for Operation Bumblebee's developmental XPM (Experimental Prototype Missile) SAM).

== Bibliography ==
- Friedman, Norman (1994). U.S. Submarines Since 1945: An Illustrated Design History. Annapolis, Maryland: United States Naval Institute. ISBN 1-55750-260-9.
- Friedman, Norman (1985). U.S. Battleships: An Illustrated Design History. Annapolis, Maryland: United States Naval Institute. ISBN 978-0-87021-715-9.
- Friedman, Norman (1984). U.S. Cruisers: An Illustrated Design History. Annapolis, Maryland: United States Naval Institute. ISBN 0-87021-718-6.
- Scarpaci, Wayne (April 2008). Iowa Class Battleships and Alaska Class Large Cruisers Conversion Projects 1942–1964: An Illustrated Technical Reference. Nimble Books LLC. ISBN 978-1-934840-38-2.
- SSM-N-2 Triton on Italian Wikipedia
