= USS Grayback =

USS Grayback may refer to the following vessels of the United States Navy:

- USS Grayback (SS-208), a Tambor-class submarine, commissioned in 1941 and sunk in 1944
- USS Grayback (SSG-574), a Grayback-class submarine, commissioned in 1958 and stricken in 1984
