= SSM-N-6 Rigel =

- Type: Cruise missile
- Place of origin: United States

Service history
- Used by: United States Navy

Production history
- Manufacturer: Grumman

Specifications
- Mass: 23,800 pounds (10,800 kg) (with boosters); 13,000 pounds (5,900 kg) (w/o boosters)
- Length: 46 feet 1 inch (14.05 m)
- Diameter: 3.75 feet (1.14 m)
- Wingspan: 13 feet 4 inches (4.06 m)
- Warhead: 3,000 pounds (1,400 kg) such as the W5 warhead
- Engine: 2 × Marquardt 28 ramjet 6,000 lbf (27 kN); 4 × booster rockets 8,000 lbf (36 kN)
- Operational range: 500 nautical miles (926 km)
- Maximum speed: Mach 2
- Launch platform: submarine

The SSM-N-6 Rigel was a proposed United States Navy submarine-launched, nuclear-capable ramjet-powered cruise missile.

== Etymology ==
The Rigel missile was named after Rigel, the brightest star in the constellation Orion.

== Development ==
In 1946 the US Navy sanctioned development of the Rigel missile as a sub-launched supersonic weapon to attack enemy shores, in parallel with development of the subsonic SSM-N-8 Regulus. The SSM-N-6 was to be launched by means of 4 rocket boosters and a catapult, with two ramjets for the cruise mode of the flight.

Several Rigel test articles were built to test the planned ramjet system for the Rigel missile. They had a single ramjet and a single rocket booster. Subsequently, scaled-down Flight Test Vehicles (FTVs) were built with a configuration similar to the full-scale missile, and the first FTV launch occurred in May 1950. Unfortunately, plans to build the SSM-N-6 missiles were cancelled because the failure of FTV flight tests, but also due to the fact that Rigel posed a problem for submariners by requiring a longer launch rail on submarines than the SSM-N-8 Regulus.

== Operators ==
- United States

United States Navy (planned)

== See also ==
- List of missiles
