= USS Grayback (SSG-574) =

Lead ship of US Navy submarine class

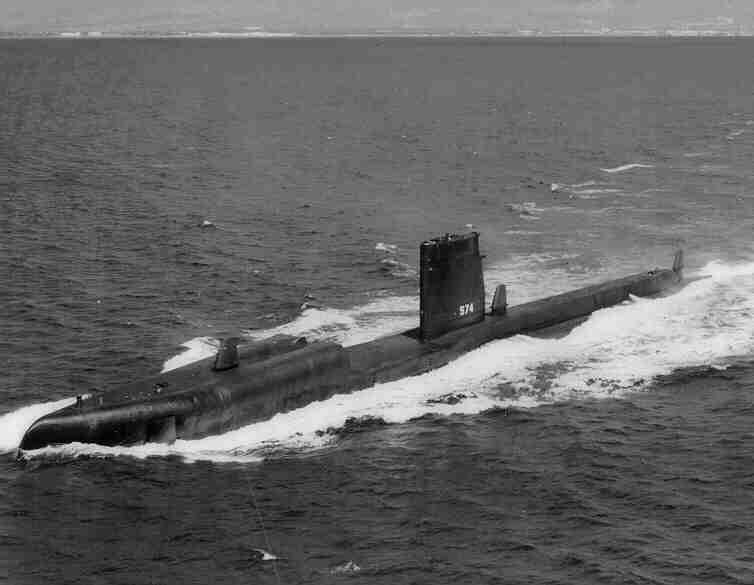
- Grayback (LPSS-574), underway, c. 1968

History

United States
- Name: USS Grayback
- Ordered: 10 March 1951
- Builder: Mare Island Naval Shipyard
- Laid down: 1 July 1954
- Launched: 2 July 1957
- Sponsored by: Mrs. John A. Moore
- Commissioned: 7 March 1958, as SSG-574
- Decommissioned: 25 May 1964
- Recommissioned: 9 May 1969, as LPSS-574
- Decommissioned: 15 January 1984
- Stricken: 16 January 1984
- Home port: Pearl Harbor
- Motto: De Profundis Futurus
- Fate: Sunk as a target near Subic Bay, 13 April 1986

General characteristics
- Class & type: Grayback-class submarine
- Displacement: 1,740 long tons (1,768 t) light; 2,768 long tons (2,812 t) full
- Length: 273 ft (83 m) later extended to 317 ft 7 in (96.80 m)
- Beam: 27 ft 2 in (8.28 m)
- Draft: 19 ft (5.8 m)
- Propulsion: 3 Fairbanks-Morse Diesel engines, 2 Elliott electric motors
- Speed: 15 knots (28 km/h; 17 mph) surfaced, 12 knots (22 km/h; 14 mph) submerged
- Complement: 84 officers and men
- Armament: 2 × Regulus missile hangars (4 x Regulus I missiles or 2 x Regulus II missiles); 8 × 21 inch (533 mm) torpedo tubes (6 bow, 2 stern)

USS Grayback (SS/SSG/APSS/LPSS-574), the lead ship of her class of submarine, was the second ship of the United States Navy to be named for the grayback.

== Construction and commissioning ==
Grayback′s keel was laid down on 1 July 1954 by the Mare Island Naval Shipyard of Vallejo, California. She was launched on 2 July 1957, sponsored by Mrs. John A. Moore, widow of the last commanding officer of the previous USS Grayback (SS-208), and commissioned at Mare Island on 7 March 1958. Grayback was initially designated as an attack submarine, but was converted in 1958 into a guided-missile submarine (SSG-574) armed with the Regulus nuclear cruise missile.

== Operational history ==
=== Guided missile submarine ===
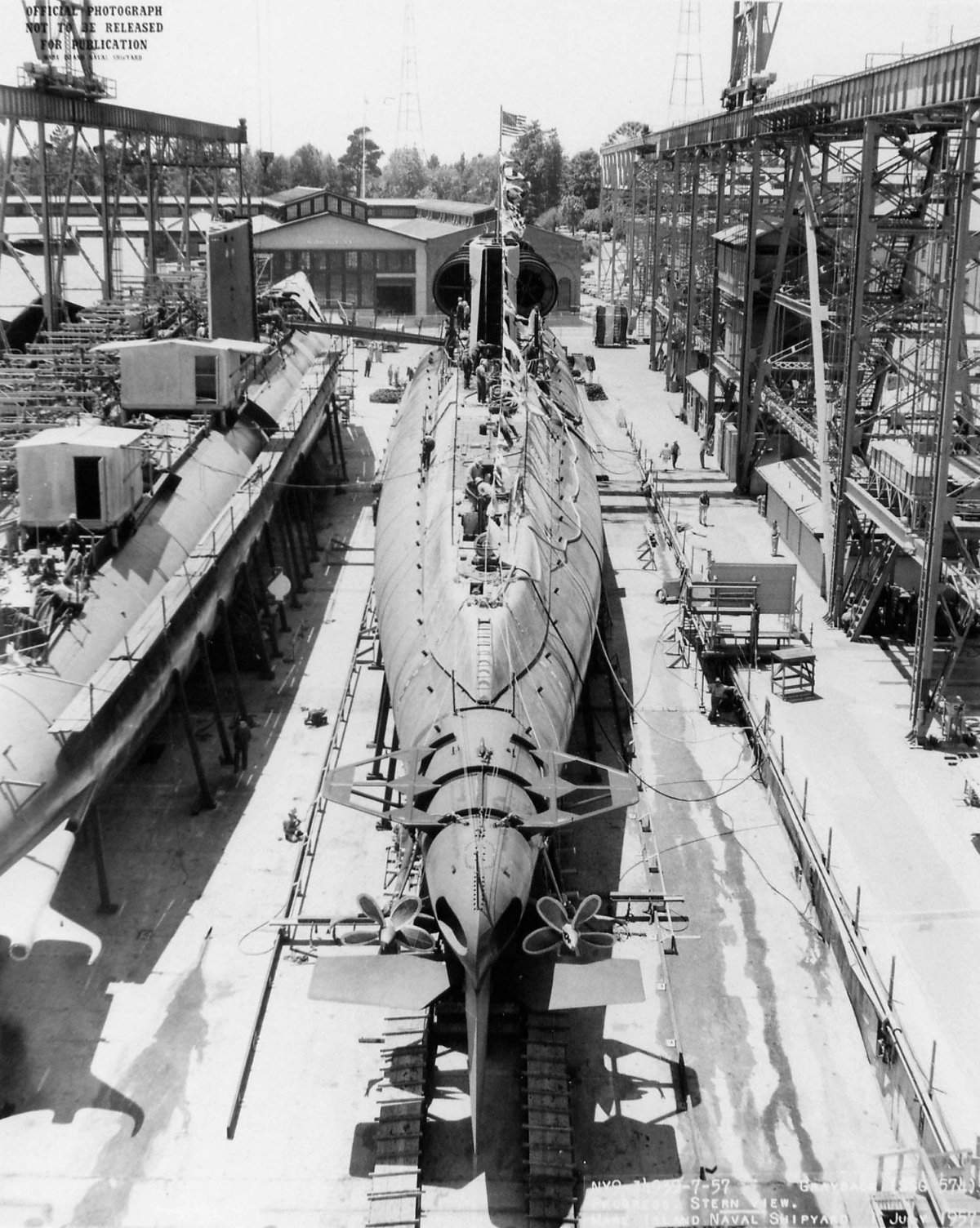
Grayback prior to launch

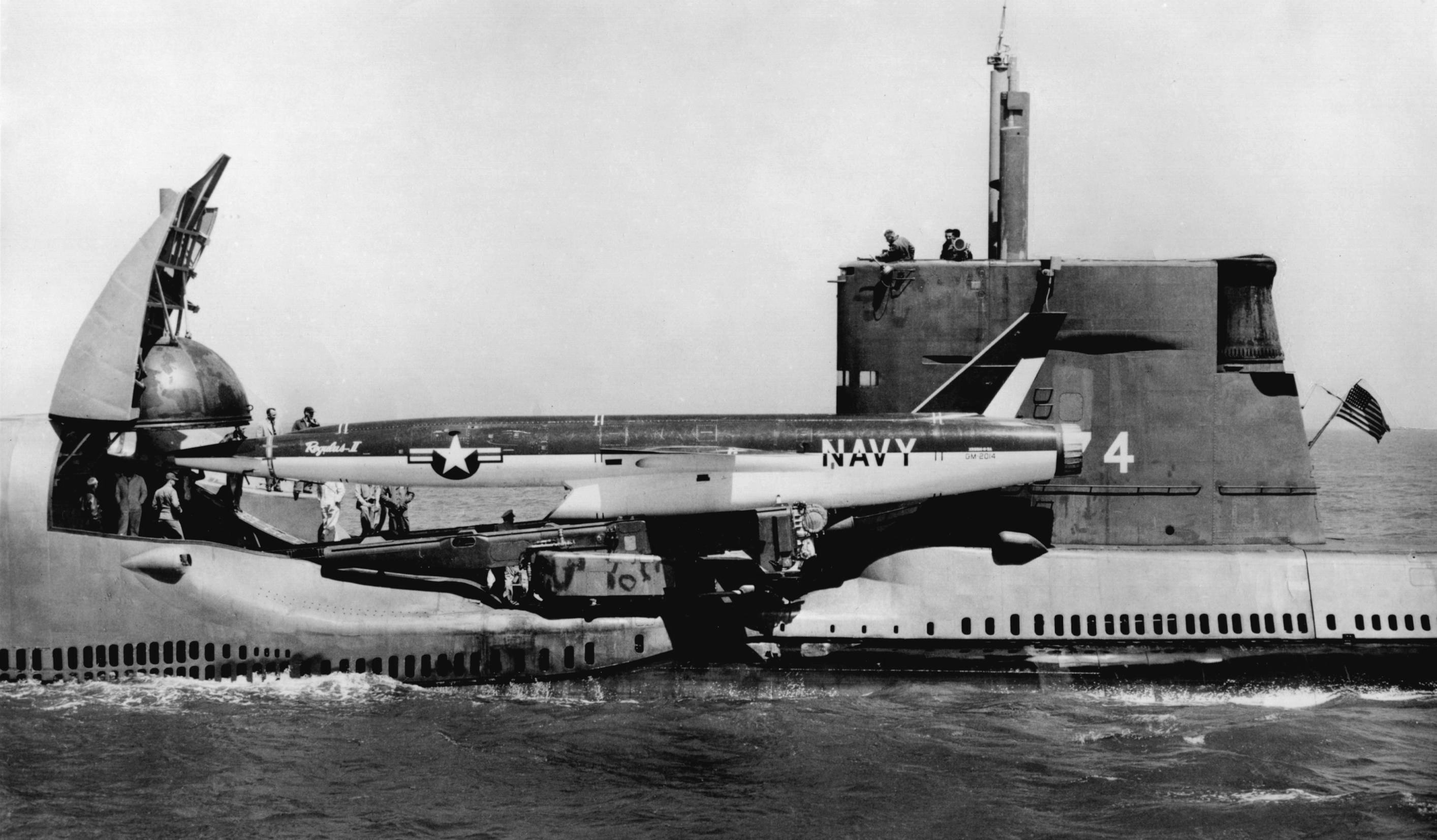
Grayback preparing to launch a Regulus II missile

Grayback represented a new class of SSG guided missile submarines, and was to be the first to carry the Regulus II sea-to-surface missile. In 1958, Grayback conducted tests and shakedown along the West Coast. While operating out of Naval Base Ventura County in Port Hueneme, California, in September 1958 she conducted the first successful launching of a Regulus II missile from a submarine, whose predecessor, Regulus I, had led to the capability of navies to attack land bases since its deployment in 1957. Regulus II was cancelled in December 1958 except for test firing of missiles already built, so Grayback operationally deployed with four Regulus I missiles. Departing San Diego, California, on 30 October, Grayback arrived at Pearl Harbor on 8 November for a month of exercises and maneuvers before returning to Mare Island for her "10,000 mile checkup."

On 9 February 1959, Grayback departed Mare Island to make Pearl Harbor her permanent home base, reaching Hawaii on 7 March via Port Hueneme, California, Long Beach, California, and Mazatlan, Mexico. After a series of exercises there, she cruised to Dutch Harbor, Umak Island, Sequam Island, and Kodiak, Alaska, for further missile exercises from 3–31 July. This was followed by the first of her nine deterrent missile strike missions, from 21 September to 12 November. Grayback's first patrol terminated at Yokosuka, Japan, as did two others. She returned to Pearl Harbor 8 December.

On 22 February 1960, Grayback modified her missile launching system and simplified her complex electrical circuits. After this, she again took up deterrent missile strike missions. Over the next 2½ years she completed seven missions for a total of nearly 18 months at sea, much of this time submerged. In addition to Yokosuka, both Adak, Alaska, and Pearl Harbor also served as termination points for these patrols. On her nine patrols she spent more than 20 months at sea and logged over 130,000 miles (209,000 km) on deterrent missile strike missions.

That schedule took its toll. On 27 August 1963, while snorkeling to recharge batteries, Grayback was buffeted by particularly strong seas. The buffeting caused the After Main Battery breaker to short, starting a fire in the berthing compartment. One seaman failed to evacuate the compartment and was overcome by smoke and fumes. Main propulsion was lost for a short time, was restored, and Grayback returned to Pearl Harbor under her own power. Repairs took two weeks.

According to the documentary "Regulus: The First Nuclear Missile Submarines" the primary target for Grayback in the event of a nuclear exchange would be to eliminate the Soviet naval base at Petropavlovsk-Kamchatsky. The patrols made by Grayback and its sister Regulus-firing submarines represented the first ever deterrent patrols in the history of the submarine Navy, preceding those made by the Polaris missile firing submarines.

As more Polaris missile submarines became operational, they assumed the deterrent functions previously assigned to Grayback and her sister ships. The Regulus missile program ended in 1964 and Grayback was withdrawn from active service. She decommissioned at Mare Island Naval Shipyard, California, on 25 May 1964.

=== Amphibious transport submarine ===
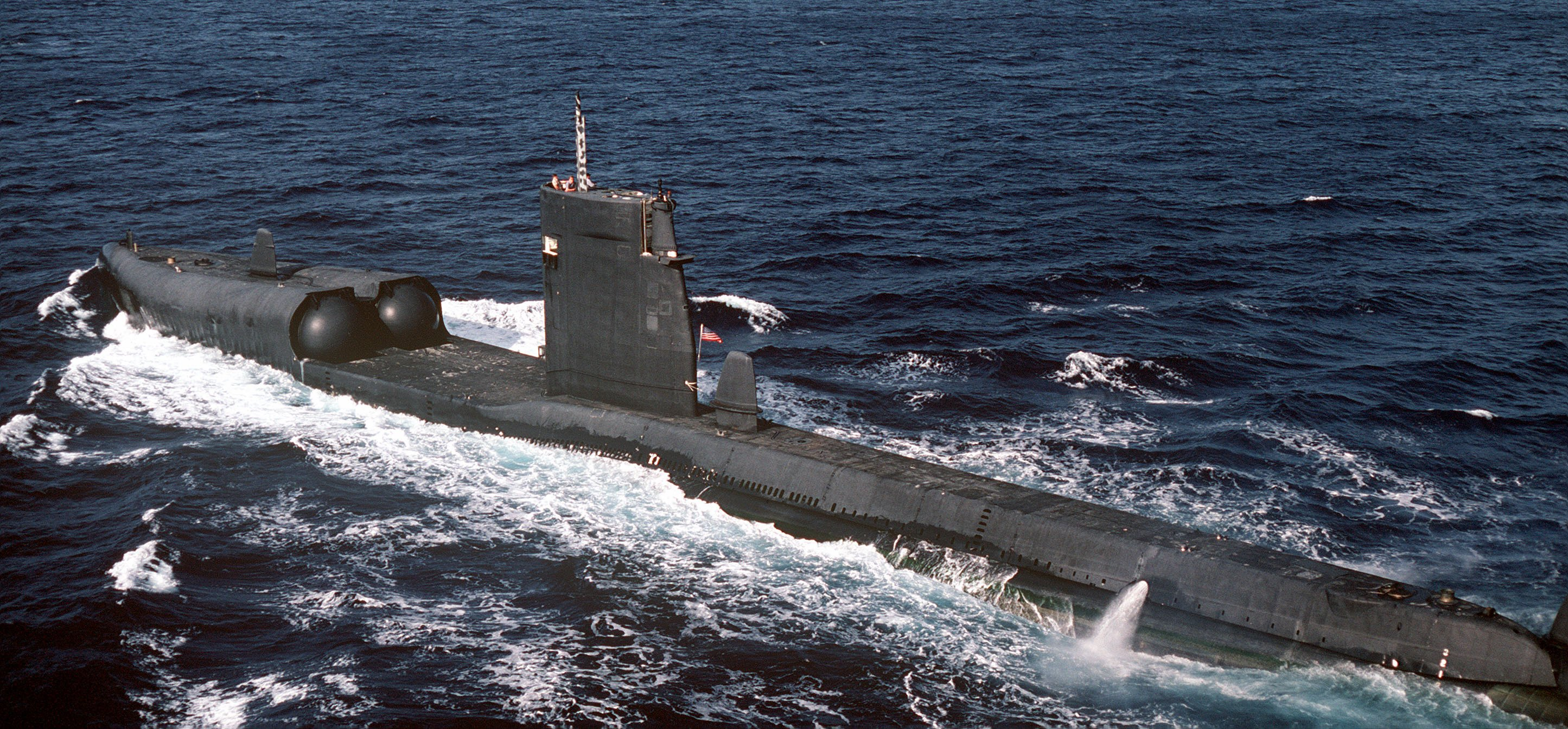
1982 view

A second conversion began at the Mare Island Naval Shipyard in November 1967. The conversion was originally estimated at US$15.2 million, but grew to over US$30 million. She was re-classified from a guided missile submarine to an amphibious transport submarine with hull classification symbol LPSS-574 on 30 August 1968. (The Naval Vessel Registry entry for Grayback shows that at one point she was classified as a "plain" transport submarine, an APSS. The term "APSS", for Auxiliary Personnel Submarine, appeared on the construction plans and documents during the conversion design and construction period (per Structural Naval Architect, Mare Island, 1966-1968). Crew memoirs indicated that they were never aware of it. Presumably, while this classification was "official," it may have lasted only days.)

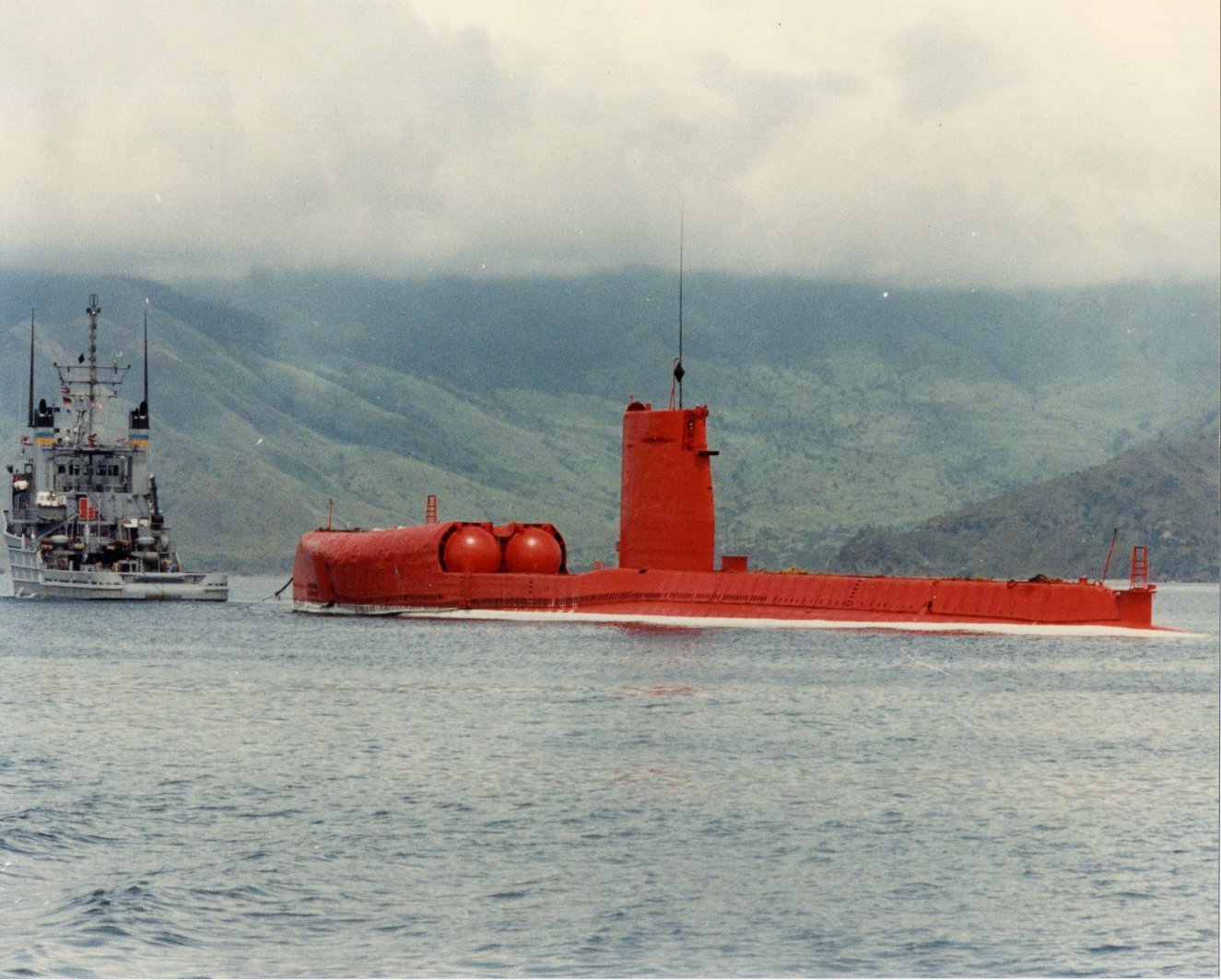
Grayback painted orange for sinking

The conversion heightened her sail by ten feet, added two auxiliary tanks to the forward end of the engine room (increasing the length of the boat by 12 feet), and converted the missile chambers to carry 67 embarked troops and SEAL Swimmer Delivery Vehicles (SDVs), including a decompression chamber in the starboard hangar.

In June 1972, the Grayback carried a team of Navy SEALs into the coastal waters of North Vietnam as part of Operation Thunderhead. This was the last attempt during the Vietnam War to rescue American POWs held in North Vietnam.

In January 1982 five U.S. Navy divers died when a vacuum was inadvertently drawn in a chamber on Grayback off the coast of Subic Bay. The diving accident led to changes in how the Navy designed, built, maintained and operated complex submarine based diving systems.

Grayback was decommissioned for the second time on 15 January 1984 at Subic Bay Naval Station in the Republic of the Philippines. After decommissioning, Grayback was sunk as a target on 13 April 1986 in the South China Sea.

== Awards ==
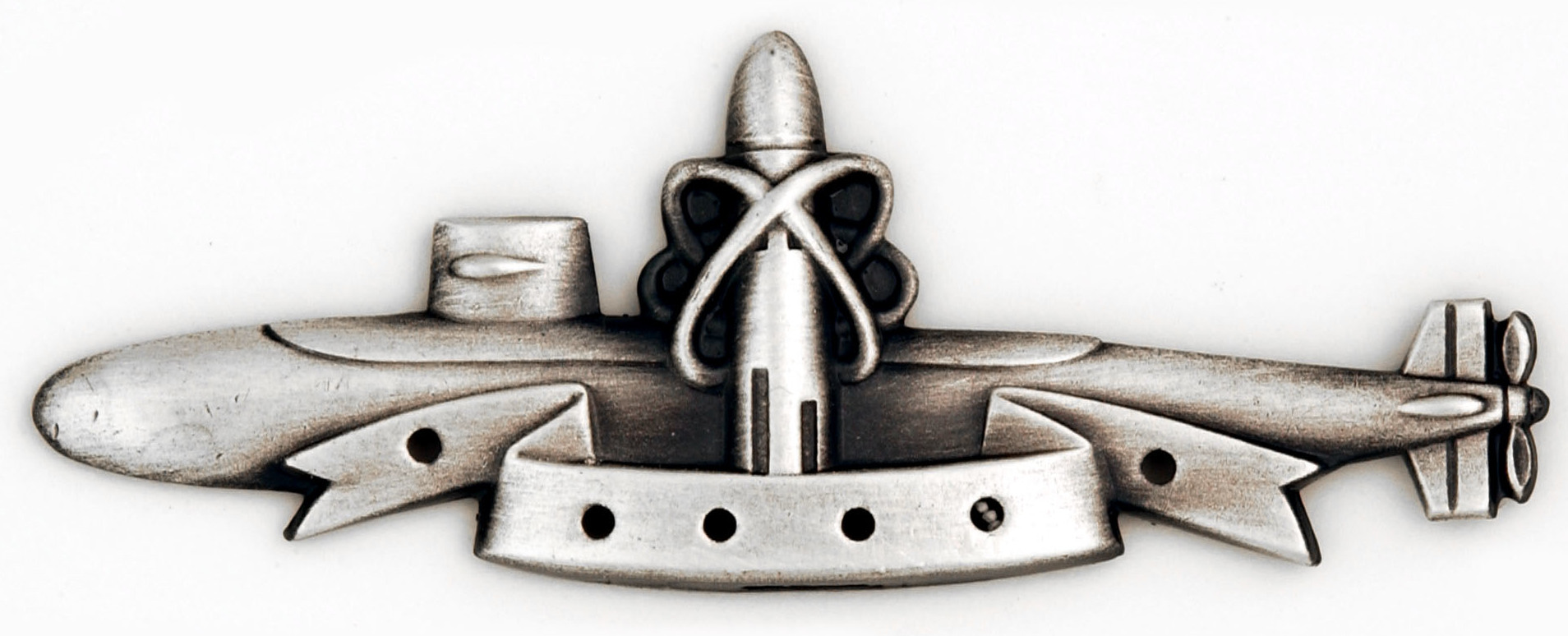

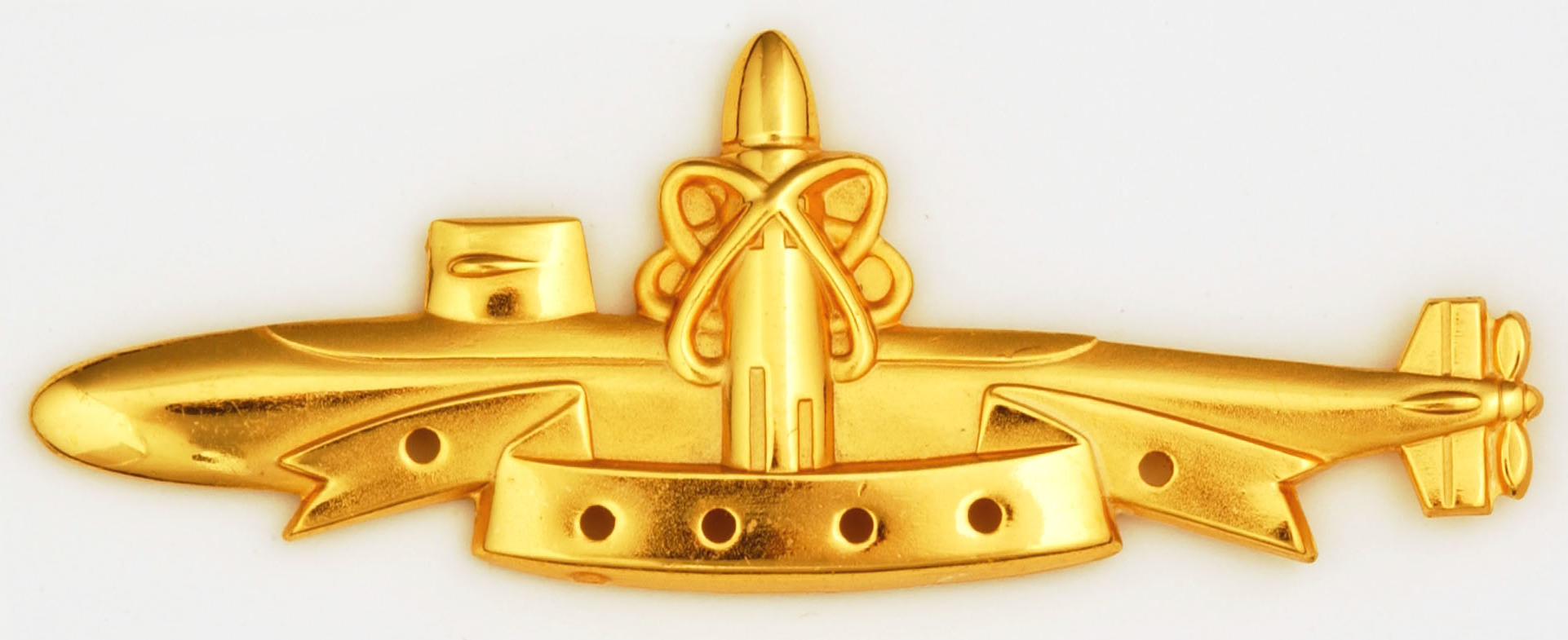
SSBN Deterrent Patrol Pin, in silver and gold. Crewmen that served aboard Grayback and conducted strategic deterrent patrols were permitted to wear the SSBN Deterrent Patrol insignia from 1997.

National Defense Service Medal	Vietnam Service Medal	Republic of Vietnam Campaign Medal

In April 1997, officers and men of Grayback and the other four US Navy submarines that conducted strategic deterrent patrols in the Western Pacific between 1959 and 1964 were awarded the right to wear the Navy's SSBN Deterrent Patrol insignia.
