= SSM-N-8 Regulus =

US Navy cruise missile

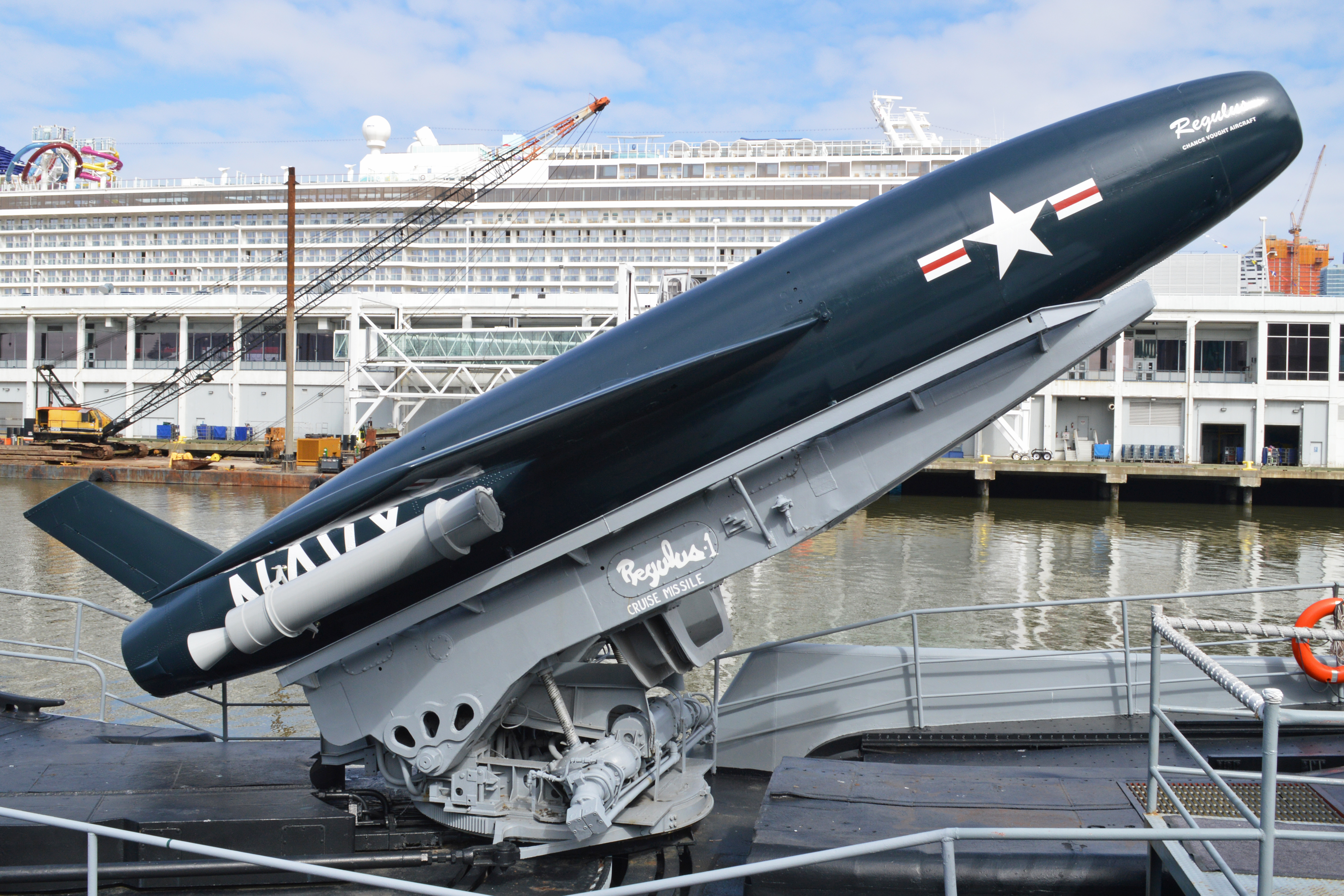
- SSM-N-8 Regulus I on display at the Intrepid Sea, Air & Space Museum
- Type: Cruise missile
- Place of origin: United States

Service history
- In service: 1955-64
- Used by: United States Navy

Production history
- Manufacturer: Chance Vought
- Produced: March 1951

Specifications
- Mass: 13,685 pounds (6,207 kg)
- Length: 32 feet 2 inches (9.80 m)
- Diameter: 4 feet 8.5 inches (1.435 m)
- Wingspan: 21 feet (6.4 m) extended 9 feet 10.5 inches (3.010 m) folded
- Warhead: 3,000 pounds (1,400 kg) such as the W5 warhead or the W27 warhead
- Engine: Allison J33-A-14 turbojet 4,600 lbf (20 kN); 2 × Aerojet 2.2-KS-33,000 booster rockets 33,000 lbf (150 kN) apiece.
- Operational range: 500 nautical miles (926 km)
- Maximum speed: Subsonic
- Guidance system: radio-command by ground stations, aircraft, or ships along the flight path

The SSM-N-8A Regulus, also known as the Regulus I and RGM-6, was a nuclear-capable turbojet-powered second generation cruise missile operated by the US Navy between 1955 and 1964. Its development was an outgrowth of U.S. Navy tests conducted with the German V-1 missile at Naval Air Station Point Mugu in California. Its barrel-shaped fuselage resembled that of numerous fighter aircraft designs of the era, but without a cockpit. Test articles of the Regulus were equipped with landing gear and could take off and land like an airplane. When the missiles were deployed they were launched from a rail launcher, and equipped with a pair of Aerojet 2.2-KS-33,000 JATO bottles on the aft end of the fuselage.

== History ==
=== Design and development ===
==== Background ====
Nazi Germany's use of the V-1 flying bomb during World War II marked the first combat deployment of a cruise missile, highlighting the potential of a new class of weapon. Even before Germany's surrender, the United States captured, reverse-engineered, and mass-produced its own version of the V-1, the Republic-Ford JB-2 Loon, intended for use against Japan. With the war's end and the onset of the Cold War, the U.S. sought new ways to deploy nuclear warheads. One proposal, put forward by Captain Thomas Klakring, was to launch nuclear missiles from submarines. He argued that submarines would be far more difficult to detect and attack than surface ships, such as aircraft carriers, while also introducing a new method of warhead delivery beyond aircraft. At the time, bombers were the U.S. military's only means of delivering nuclear warheads, a reliance that threatened to diminish the Navy's role and overemphasize a single approach to nuclear strategy.

Klakring proposed launching the Loon from submarines to test his concept. Work began in 1946, and by 1947, USS Cusk became the first U.S. submarine to fire a guided missile. Testing continued for several years, but significant issues arose. Cusk nearly sank when a Loon exploded on deck, and the missile itself was slow, had limited range and payload, and was impractical for military use. Despite these shortcomings, the tests successfully demonstrated how a submarine could surface, launch a missile, and submerge again, making it difficult for an enemy to retaliate. The Navy acknowledged the concept’s potential but recognized the need for a missile specifically designed for submarine deployment.

==== Development ====
Development of such a missile began with Grumman's SSM-N-6 Rigel and the Johns Hopkins Applied Physics Laboratory's SSM-N-2 Triton. However, work did not begin in earnest until August of 1947, days after the United States Army Air Force awarded a contract for the ground-based MGM-1 Matador cruise missile. The Navy, not wanting to lose its edge in missile development, began Project Regulus with the same equipment used in the Matador. On 17 November 1947, a contract was awarded to Chance Vought, which previously investigated a similar project as part of a study on "pilotless missiles". The company, desperate for government contracts as the money-making F4U Corsair production line was nearing an end, focused on a practical design that could be brought into service quickly. With its survival at stake, the company invested heavily in research and development, drawing from experience with jet fighter projects such as the broadly similar F6U Pirate. The Navy initially planned on having each missile be operational in a sequential order, starting with the simple Regulus and ending with the more complex but capable Triton in 1960. However, both the Rigel and Triton were powered by ramjets, which presented a significant challenge as the technology was too immature for immediate use, eventually leading to both programs' cancellation.

==== Design ====
The contract required the missile to have a range of 500 nautical miles (930 km) at Mach 0.85, a 3,000-pound (1,400 kg) warhead, and a circular error probable (margin of error) of 2.5 nautical miles (4.6 km). Regulus was designed to be 30 feet (9.1 m) long, 10 feet (3.0 m) in wingspan, 4 feet (1.2 m) in diameter, and would weigh between 10,000 and 12,000 pounds (4,500 and 5,400 kg). The missile somewhat resembled the contemporary F-84 Thunderjet fighter aircraft, but without a cockpit, and test versions were equipped with landing gear so that they could be recovered and re-used. After launch, Regulus would be guided toward its target by control stations, typically by submarines or surface ships equipped with guidance equipment. It could also be flown remotely by chase aircraft. (Later, with the "Trounce" system (Tactical Radar Omnidirectional Underwater Navigational Control Equipment), one submarine could guide it). Army-Navy competition complicated both the Matador's and the Regulus' developments. The missiles looked alike and used the same engine. They had nearly identical performances, schedules, and costs. Under pressure to reduce defense spending, the United States Department of Defense ordered the Navy to determine if Matador could be adapted for their use. The Navy concluded that the Navy's Regulus could perform the Navy mission better.

Regulus had some advantages over Matador. It required only two guidance stations while Matador required three. It could also be launched quicker, as Matador's boosters had to be fitted while the missile was on the launcher while Regulus was stowed with its boosters attached. Finally, Chance Vought built a recoverable version of the missile, designated KDU-1 and also used as a target drone, so that even though a Regulus test vehicle was more expensive to build, Regulus was cheaper to use over a series of tests. The Navy program continued, and the first Regulus flew in March 1951.

Due to its size and regulations concerning oversize loads on highways, Chance Vought collaborated with a firm that specialized in trucking oversize loads to develop a special tractor trailer combination which could move a Regulus I missile.

=== Ships and submarines deployed with Regulus I ===
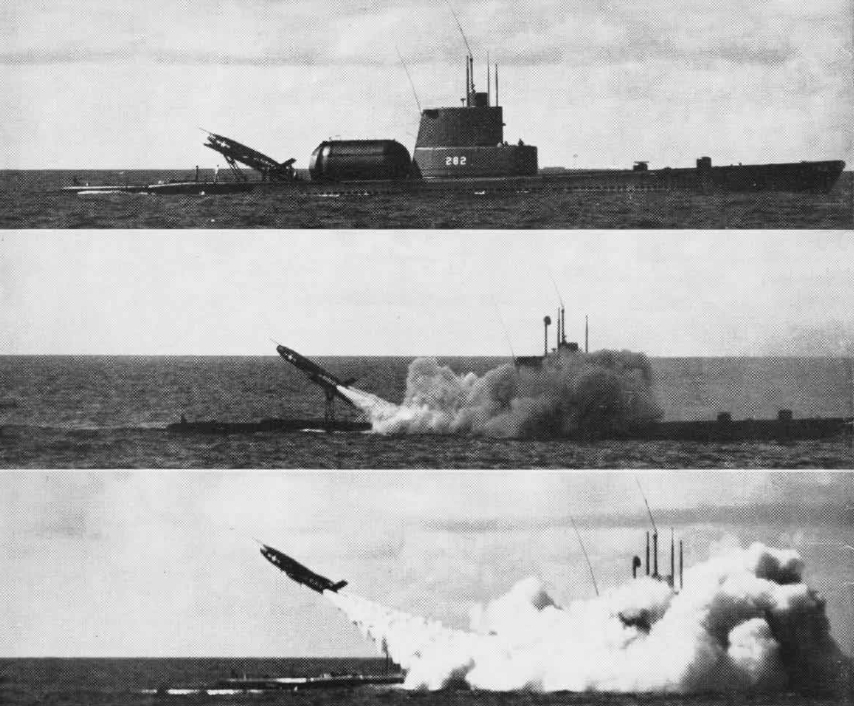
USS Tunny launches a Regulus I in 1956.

The first launch from a submarine occurred in July 1953 from the deck of USS Tunny, a World War II fleet boat modified to carry Regulus. Tunny and her sister boat USS Barbero were the United States's first nuclear deterrent patrol submarines. They were joined in 1958 by two purpose-built Regulus submarines, USS Grayback and USS Growler, and, later, by the nuclear-powered USS Halibut. Halibut, with its extremely large internal hangar could carry five missiles and was intended to be the prototype of a whole new class of cruise missile firing SSG-N submarines.

The Navy strategy called for four Regulus missiles to be at sea at any given time. Thus, Barbero and Tunny, each of which carried two Regulus missiles, patrolled simultaneously. Growler and Grayback, with four missiles each, or Halibut, with five, could patrol alone. Operating from Pearl Harbor, Hawaii, the five Regulus submarines made 40 nuclear deterrent patrols in the Northern Pacific Ocean between October 1959 and July 1964, including during the Cuban Missile Crisis of 1962. According to the documentary "Regulus: The First Nuclear Missile Submarines" by Nick T. Spark, their primary task in the event of a nuclear exchange would be to eliminate the Soviet naval base at Petropavlovsk-Kamchatsky. These deterrent patrols represented the first by the Navy's submarines and preceded those made by the Polaris missile submarines.

Regulus submarines
Class	Name	In Commission	Number of missiles	Post-Regulus use
Gato	Tunny	1953-1965	2	Converted to amphibious transport submarine
Balao	Barbero	1955-1964	2	Expended as target 1964
Grayback	Grayback	1958-1964	4	Converted to amphibious transport submarine
Grayback	Growler	1958-1964	4	Decommissioned, memorial 1988
Halibut	Halibut	1960-1964	5	Converted to special mission submarine

The Regulus firing submarines were relieved by the George Washington-class submarines carrying the Polaris missile system. Barbero also earned the distinction of launching the only delivery of missile mail.

Additional submarines including USS Cusk and USS Carbonero were equipped with control systems that allowed them to take control of a Regulus in flight, thus extending its range in a tactical situation.

Regulus was also deployed by the U.S. Navy in 1955 in the Pacific on board the cruiser USS Los Angeles. In 1956, three more followed: USS Macon, USS Toledo, and USS Helena. These four Baltimore-class cruisers each carried three Regulus missiles on operational patrols in the Western Pacific. Macon's last Regulus patrol was in 1958, Toledo's in 1959, Helena's in 1960, and Los Angeles's in 1961.

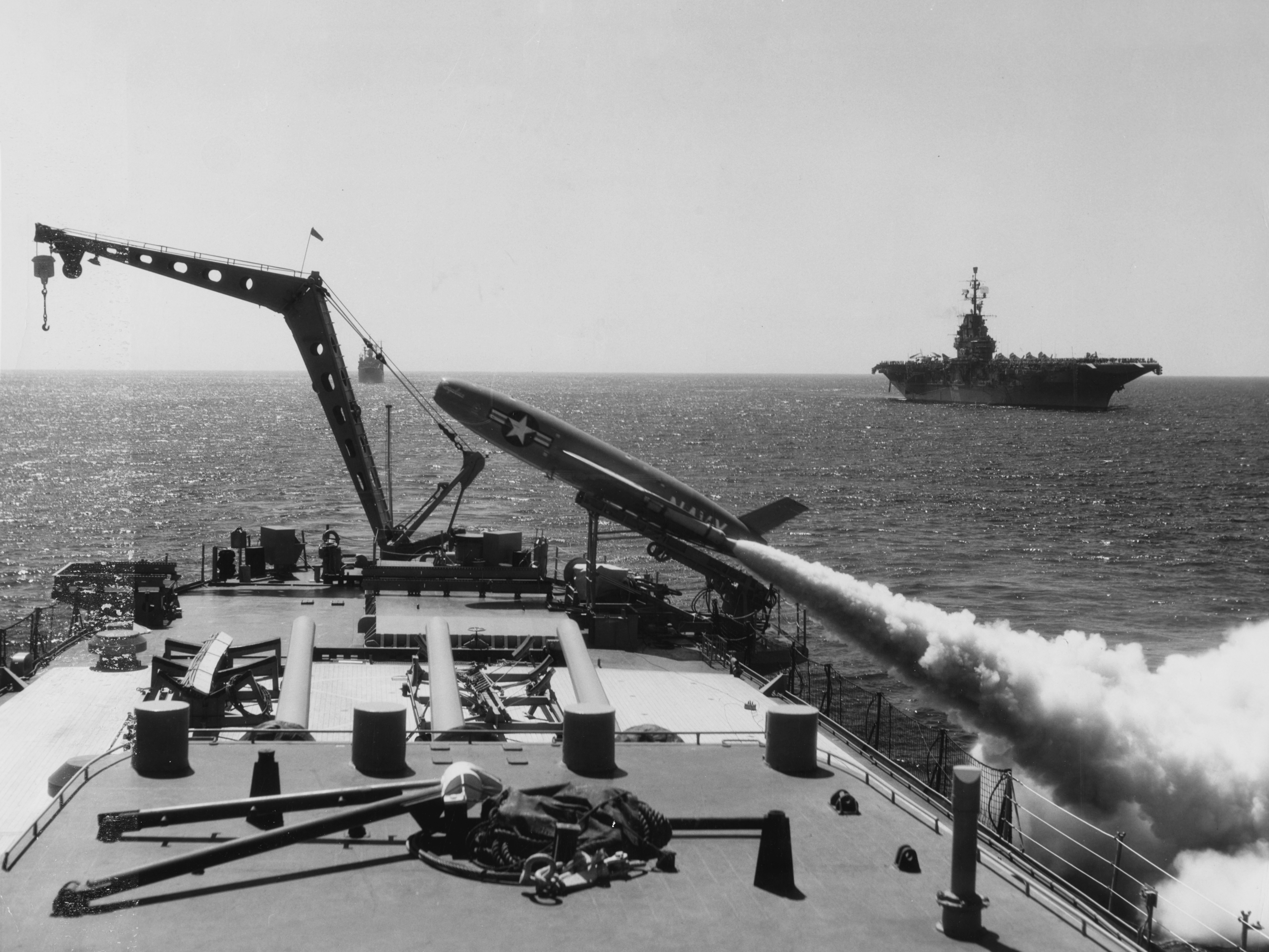
A Regulus I fired from USS Los Angeles, 1957.

Ten aircraft carriers were configured to operate Regulus missiles (though only six ever launched one). USS Princeton did not deploy with the missile but conducted the first launch of a Regulus from a warship. USS Saratoga also did not deploy but was involved in two demonstration launches. USS Franklin D. Roosevelt and USS Lexington each conducted one test launch. USS Randolph deployed to the Mediterranean carrying three Regulus missiles. USS Hancock deployed once to the Western Pacific with four missiles in 1955. Lexington, Hancock, USS Shangri-La, and USS Ticonderoga were involved in the development of the Regulus Assault Mission (RAM) concept. RAM converted the Regulus cruise missiles into an unmanned aerial vehicle (UAV): Regulus missiles would be launched from cruisers or submarines, and once in flight, guided to their targets by carrier-based pilots with remote control equipment.

=== Replacement and legacy ===
Despite being the U.S. Navy's first underwater nuclear capability, the Regulus missile system had significant operational drawbacks. In order to launch, the submarine had to surface and assemble the missile in whatever sea conditions it was in. Because it required active radar guidance, which only had a range of 225 nmi (259 mi; 417 km), the ship had to stay stationary on the surface to guide it to the target while effectively broadcasting its location. This guidance method was susceptible to jamming and since the missile was subsonic, the launch platform remained exposed and vulnerable to attack during its flight duration; destroying the ship would effectively disable the missile in flight.

Production of Regulus was phased out in January 1959 with delivery of the 514th missile; in 1962, it was redesignated RGM-6. It was removed from service in August 1964. Some of the obsolete missiles were expended as targets at Eglin Air Force Base, Florida. Regulus not only provided the first nuclear strategic deterrence force for the United States Navy during the first years of the Cold War and especially during the Cuban Missile Crisis, preceding the Polaris missiles, Poseidon missiles, and Trident missiles that followed, but it was also the forerunner of the Tomahawk cruise missile.

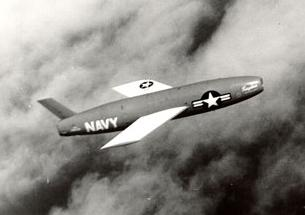
A KDU-1 target drone

Following retirement, a number of Regulus I missiles were converted for target drone usage under the designation BQM-6C.

== Regulus II ==
A second generation supersonic Vought SSM-N-9 Regulus II cruise missile with a range of 1,200 nautical miles (2,200 km) and a speed of Mach 2 was developed and successfully tested, including a test launch from Grayback, but the program was canceled in favor of the UGM-27 Polaris nuclear ballistic missile.

The Regulus II missile was a completely new design with improved guidance and double the range, and was intended to replace the Regulus I missile. Regulus II-equipped submarines and ships would have been fitted with the Ships Inertial Navigation System (SINS), allowing the missiles to be aligned accurately before take-off.

Forty-eight test flights of Regulus II prototypes were carried out, 30 of which were successful, 14 partially successful and four failures. A production contract was signed in January 1958 and the only submarine launch was carried out from Grayback in September 1958.

Due to the high cost of the Regulus II (approximately one million dollars each), budgetary pressure, and the emergence of the UGM-27 Polaris SLBM (submarine-launched ballistic missile), the Regulus II program was canceled on 18 December 1958. At the time of cancellation Vought had completed 20 Regulus II missiles with 27 more on the production line. Production of Regulus I missiles continued until January 1959 with delivery of the 514th missile, and it was withdrawn from service in August 1964.

Both Regulus I and Regulus II were used as target drones after 1964.

== Surviving examples ==
The following museums in the United States have Regulus missiles on display as part of their collections:

Carolinas Aviation Museum, Charlotte, North Carolina
Regulus I missile in launch position at the Carolinas Aviation Museum in Charlotte, North Carolina. It is mounted on a catapult launching stand used for aircraft carrier launches and was restored late 2006 after having been on outdoor display for a number of years.
Frontiers of Flight Museum, Dallas Love Field, Texas
Regulus II missile
Intrepid Sea-Air-Space Museum, New York City, New York
Regulus I cruise missile can be seen ready for simulated launch on board USS Growler at the Intrepid Sea-Air-Space Museum in New York City.
Point Mugu Missile Park, Naval Air Station Point Mugu, California
The museum's collection includes both a Regulus and a Regulus II missile
USS Bowfin Museum, Pearl Harbor, Hawaii
Veterans Memorial Museum, Huntsville, Alabama
Regulus II missile
Smithsonian Institution, National Air and Space Museum
Regulus I on display at Steven F. Udvar-Hazy Center
New Jersey Naval Museum, Hackensack, New Jersey
Regulus with intact engine
US Navy Pacific Missile Range Facility, Barking Sands, island of Kauai, Hawaii
Regulus I restored in 2011 on static display inside the North Gate

== Operators ==
- United States

United States Navy (from 1955 to 1964)

== See also ==
- List of missiles
- SSBN Deterrent Patrol insignia
