= USS King County =

1944 LST-542-class tank landing ship

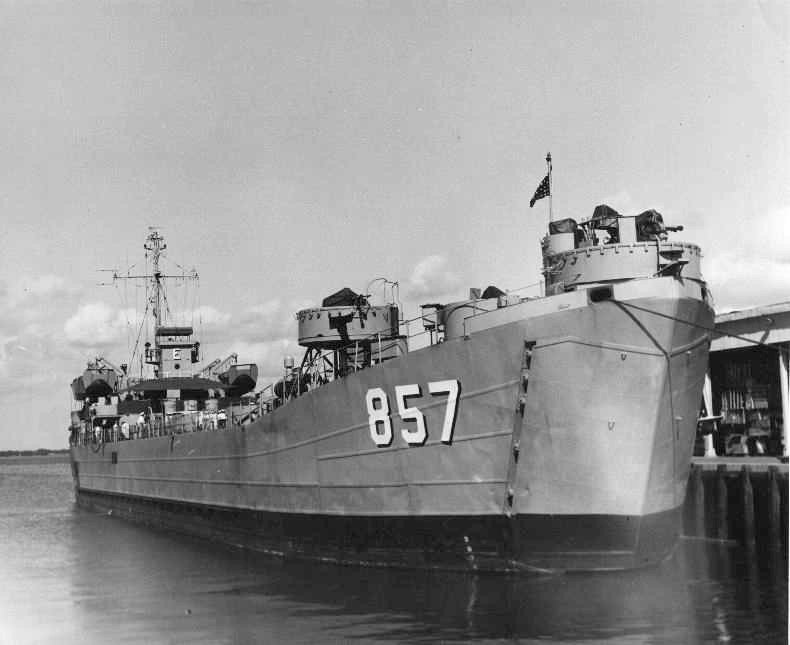
- LST-857 moored pier side, date and place unknown

History

United States
- Name: USS LST-857
- Builder: Chicago Bridge & Iron Company, Seneca, Illinois
- Laid down: 19 September 1944
- Launched: 6 December 1944
- Commissioned: 29 December 1944
- Decommissioned: 19 July 1960
- Renamed: USS King County (LST-857), 1 July 1955
- Reclassified: AG-157, 17 May 1958
- Stricken: Unknown
- Honors and awards: 1 battle star (World War II); 7 battle stars (Korea)
- Fate: Sold for scrapping, 25 April 1961

General characteristics
- Class & type: LST-542-class tank landing ship
- Displacement: 1,625 long tons (1,651 t) light; 4,080 long tons (4,145 t) full
- Length: 328 ft (100 m)
- Beam: 50 ft (15 m)
- Draft: Unloaded : 2 ft 4 in (0.71 m) forward; 7 ft 6 in (2.29 m) aft; Loaded : 8 ft 2 in (2.49 m) forward; 14 ft 1 in (4.29 m) aft
- Propulsion: 2 × General Motors 12-567 diesel engines, two shafts, twin rudders
- Speed: 12 knots (22 km/h; 14 mph)
- Boats & landing craft carried: 2 × LCVPs
- Troops: 16 officers, 147 enlisted men
- Complement: 7 officers, 104 enlisted men
- Armament: 1 × single 3-inch/50-caliber gun mount; 8 × 40 mm guns; 12 × 20 mm guns

USS King County (LST-857) was an LST-542-class tank landing ship built for the United States Navy during World War II. Named after counties in Texas and Washington, she was the only U.S. Naval vessel to bear the name.

USS LST-857 was laid down on 19 September 1944 at Seneca, Illinois by the Chicago Bridge & Iron Company; launched on 6 December 1944, sponsored by Mrs. Beatrice S. Major; and commissioned at New Orleans, Louisiana, on 29 December 1944.

== Service history ==
=== World War II, 1945 ===
After shakedown off the Florida coast, LST-857 departed New Orleans for the Pacific on 1 February 1945. Steaming via the Panama Canal, she touched the Hawaiian and Marshall Islands and reached Guam on 30 March. There she loaded bombs and ammunition and departed on 21 April for Iwo Jima. Steaming via Saipan, she reached Iwo Jima on 1 May, unloaded her cargo, then sailed on 18 May. Carrying 334 enemy prisoners, she returned to Guam the 21st.

Between 23 and 30 May, LST-857 carried a cargo of fog oil to Okinawa. She supplied ships at Hagushi until 24 June. Returning to Guam on 4 July, she loaded troops and Army construction equipment, then sailed for Okinawa on the 16th. She operated there from 28 July to 5 August; and, after returning to Saipan on 11 August, she loaded cargo and departed for the Philippines on 3 September.

=== Post-war activities, 1945–1948 ===
LST-857 arrived San Pedro Bay, Leyte, on 10 September and was assigned to support occupation operations in Japan. After embarking ordnance and construction troops and loading equipment at Iloilo, Panay, and Batangas, Luzon, she sailed in convoy for Japan on 20 September. She reached Tokyo Bay on the 29th and, until 25 October, operated along the coast of Honshū shuttling occupation troops and cargo. She returned to the Philippines early in November; and, after embarking additional troops, she returned to Japan on 18 November and resumed occupation operations. Departing Yokohama on 15 December, she steamed via Saipan and Pearl Harbor to the United States and arrived at San Francisco on 25 January 1946.

During the next six months LST-857 operated along the California coast between San Francisco and San Diego. She departed San Diego on 31 July, reached Pearl Harbor on 11 August, and began supply runs under Service Force, Pacific Fleet. For more than three years she operated out of Pearl Harbor, carrying passengers and supplies to bases in the Hawaiian Islands and to Johnson and Canton Islands. Between 3 April and 6 August 1948 she deployed to the Marshall Islands where she conducted shuttle service among the atolls.

=== Korean War, 1950–1953 ===
Departing Pearl Harbor on 3 January 1950, LST-857 returned to the West Coast on 14 January. After overhaul at Mare Island, she operated out of Astoria, Oregon, and San Diego until 1 July when she departed San Francisco for Hawaii. She arrived Pearl Harbor on 11 July; and, after serving briefly as inter-island transport, she departed on 18 August to support the effort to repel Communist aggression in South Korea. She arrived Yokosuka, Japan, on 4 September, then shifted to Kobe, Japan, the next day. After embarking men and equipment of the 1st Marine Engineer Battalion, she sortied on 10 September as part of an amphibious attack convoy bound for Inchon, South Korea.

Assigned to Task Element 90.32, LST-857 arrived off Inchon on 15 September while a heavy air-sea bombardment pounded enemy shore positions. Late that afternoon, she closed "Red Beach" under heavy mortar and machine gun fire to take part in landings which were designed to spearhead an Allied offensive northward. Despite concentrated enemy fire, she debarked assault troops and unloaded vital supplies and equipment. In addition she provided counter-battery fire and embarked battle casualties for emergency treatment. For daring bravery and heroic performance of duty on "Red Beach", the aggressive and intrepid tank landing ships, including LST-857, received the Navy Unit Commendation. LST-857 completed unloading and departed the beach early on 16 September. She returned to Sasebo, Japan, on 19 September.

She again returned to Inchon on 2 October and delivered a cargo of ammunition to the battleship Missouri. On 14 October she departed Sasebo for Hawaii and arrived at Pearl Harbor on 3 November. Following shipyard repairs, she departed on 1 December on a cargo run to the Marshall Islands. During the next ten months she conducted passenger and cargo service out of Pearl Harbor to the Marshall, Samoa, and Palmyra Islands, as well as to ports in the Hawaiian Islands.

Departing Pearl Harbor on 28 September 1951, LST-857 sailed for the Far East and arrived at Yokohama on 18 October. On the 22nd she sailed for Sasebo where she arrived on 26 October to prepare for shuttle duty along the vital water supply line between Japan and Korea. Operating primarily out of Sasebo, she transported men and supplies to ports along the western coast of Korea. In addition she supplied fleet activities along the coast of Japan. She sailed for the United States on 23 September 1954, touched at Pearl Harbor on 9 October, and arrived at San Diego on 22 October.

LST-857 returned to Pearl Harbor from San Diego on 27 November; and, after overhaul, she began passenger and cargo runs between Pearl Harbor and Midway Atoll on 2 February 1955. Named USS King County on 1 July 1955, she continued this duty until August 1956. Between 17 August and 12 September she made a supply run to the Marshalls; then she sailed for the West Coast on 1 October, arriving at Oakland, California, on the 11th.

=== Guided missile test ship, 1957–1960 ===
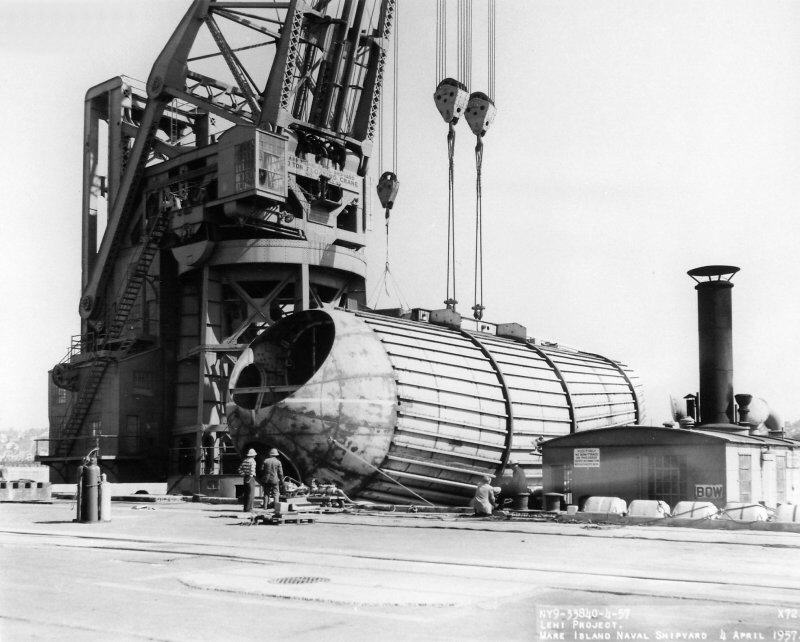
The Regulus II missile launcher aboard YD-33 at the Mare Island Navy Yard, prior to installation aboard King County, 4 April 1957.

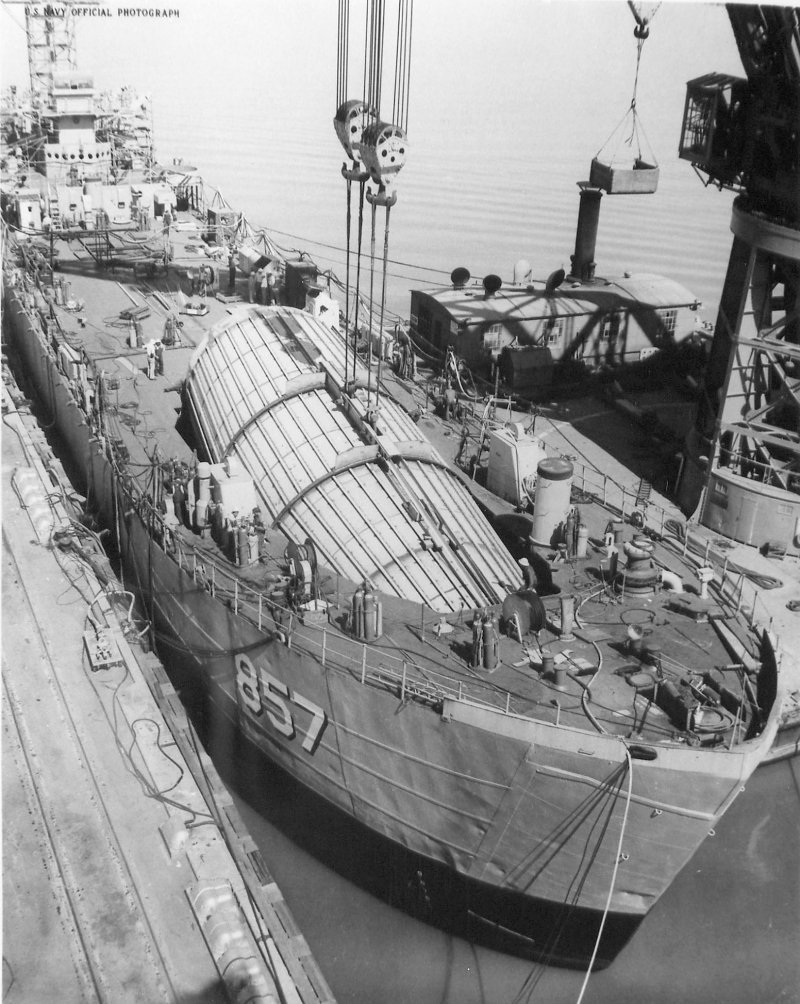
The launcher for the supersonic SSM-N-8 Regulus II cruise missile being installed aboard USS King County (AG-157), 5 April 1957. YD-33 is doing the lifting.

She entered the Mare Island Naval Shipyard on 12 October 1957 and began conversion to an experimental guided missile test ship. Reclassified AG-157 on 17 May 1958, she completed conversion on 15 November, then departed for testing and evaluation operations out of San Diego and Port Hueneme.

While undergoing conversion a mock-up submarine hull was installed on her deck for use in testing a prototype missile handling system. In addition she received launching, recording, and evaluation equipment for testing the launch and flight capabilities of Regulus II guided missiles. Capable of carrying four missiles in her hangar, she was designed as a mobile testing center for these surface-to-surface missiles.

Assigned to Submarine Squadron 5, King County conducted her first missile engine firing on 8 December while operating in the Pacific Missile Range. She fired her first Regulus II missile two days later. During the next six months she performed simulated missile launchings and served on telemetry and recovery stations in the Pacific Missile Range. Moreover, she supported the development of America's space program and participated in tracking and recovering missile nose cones.

Transferred to the 11th Naval District on 1 July 1959, she continued operating as a missile tracking and recovery ship. During the next year she cruised the missile range off Southern California and Baja California supporting missile firing and recovery operations. Operating out of Port Hueneme, she participated in tracking Temco ASM-N-8 Corvus missile firings in May and July 1960. She also supported the telemetering and recovery of the data capsule from Discovery XII.

=== Decommissioning and sale ===
After returning to Port Hueneme on 8 July 1960, she steamed to Long Beach on 19 July and decommissioned the same day. She was sold for scrapping to Zidell Explorations, Inc., on 25 April 1961.

== Awards ==
LST-857 received one battle star for World War II service and seven battle stars for Korean service.
