= Grayback-class submarine =

Class of US Navy submarines

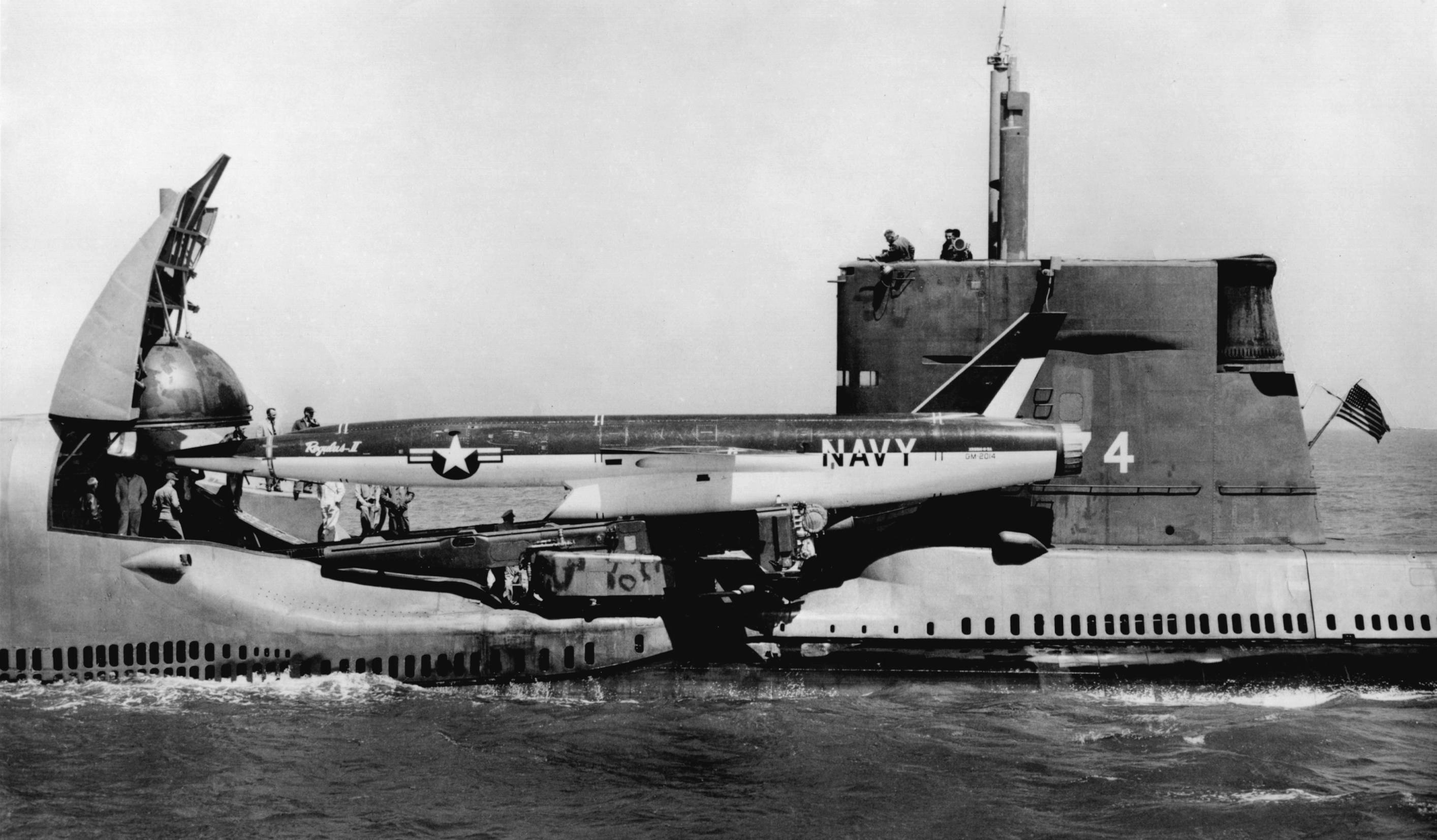
- Grayback preparing to launch a Regulus II missile, c. 1960

Class overview
- Name: Grayback class
- Operators: United States Navy
- Preceded by: Tang class
- Built: 1954–1958
- In commission: 1958–1964, 1969–1984
- Completed: 2
- Retired: 1
- Preserved: 1

General characteristics
- Type: Submarine
- Tonnage: Surfaced: 2,712 tonnes (2,670 tons) Submerged: 3,708 tonnes (3,650 tons)
- Displacement: 2,768 long tons (2,812 t) full
- Length: 317 ft 7 in (96.80 m)
- Beam: 27 ft 2 in (8.28 m)
- Draft: 19 ft (5.8 m)
- Propulsion: 3 × Fairbanks-Morse Diesel engines (total 4,500 shp (3,400 kW)), 2 × Elliott electric motors (total 5,500 shp (4,100 kW)), 4 × 126-cell GUPPY I batteries, 2 shafts
- Speed: 15 knots (28 km/h; 17 mph) surfaced, 12 knots (22 km/h; 14 mph) submerged
- Test depth: 700 ft (210 m)
- Complement: 84
- Armament: 2 × Regulus missile hangars (4 × Regulus I missiles or 2 × Regulus II missiles); 8 × 21-inch (533 mm) torpedo tubes (6 bow, 2 stern)

The Grayback-class submarine is a retired class of two guided missile-carrying submarines of the United States Navy. They carried the Regulus I and Regulus II nuclear cruise missiles, deployed 1957–64, that were rapidly phased out by Polaris Submarine Launched Ballistic Missiles (SLBMs). They and USS Halibut were the sole submarines designed specifically to carry Regulus missiles, and the only submarines capable of carrying Regulus II. However, USS Tunny and USS Barbero were modified earlier to carry two Regulus I missiles per boat.

== Design ==
On the Graybacks, two missile hangars allowed for a total of two Regulus II or four Regulus I missiles each. Since Regulus II was cancelled in December 1958 except for test firings, the class deployed with four Regulus I missiles. They were originally ordered as sisters of USS Darter, similar to the last Tang-class submarines, but were converted under project SCB 161 to missile submarines during construction. Torpedo armament was the same as the Tangs, with six bow and two stern tubes. The stern tubes were for "swim-out" weapons only, such as the Mark 37 ASW homing torpedo.

In Grayback's later role as an amphibious transport submarine, the former missile hangars were used to store SEAL Swimmer Delivery Vehicles and other equipment used by the SEALs and Marine Force Recon units.

== Boats in class ==
Name	Hull number	Builder	Laid down	Launched	Commissioned	Fate
Grayback	SSG-574	Mare Island Naval Shipyard	1 July 1954	2 July 1957	7 March 1958	Decommissioned 25 May 1964, converted to an amphibious transport submarine (LPSS) and recommissioned 1968, decommissioned 16 June 1984, expended as a target 1986
Growler	SSG-577	Portsmouth Naval Shipyard	15 February 1955	5 April 1958	30 August 1958	Decommissioned 25 May 1964, struck 30 September 1980, museum ship at the Intrepid Sea-Air-Space Museum in New York City from 29 September 1988.
