= USS Barbero =

Submarine of the United States

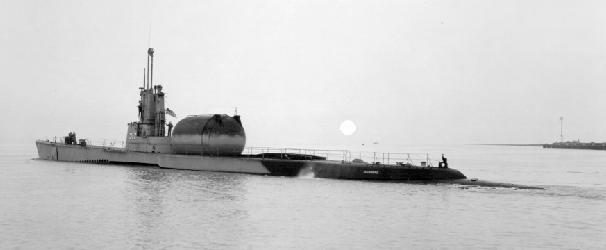
- Barbero after conversion to guided missile submarine in 1955

History

United States
- Builder: General Dynamics Electric Boat, Groton, Connecticut
- Laid down: 25 March 1943
- Launched: 12 December 1943
- Commissioned: 29 April 1944
- Decommissioned: 30 June 1950
- Recommissioned: 28 October 1955
- Decommissioned: 30 June 1964
- Stricken: 1 July 1964
- Fate: Sunk as a target off Pearl Harbor on 7 October 1964

General characteristics
- Class & type: Balao-class diesel-electric submarine
- Displacement: 1,526 tons (1,550 t) surfaced, 2,424 tons (2,460 t) submerged
- Length: 311 ft 9 in (95.02 m)
- Beam: 27 ft 3 in (8.31 m)
- Draft: 16 ft 10 in (5.13 m)maximum
- Propulsion: 4 × General Motors Model 16-278A V16 diesel engines driving electrical generators; 2 × 126-cell Sargo batteries; 4 × high-speed General Electric electric motors with reduction gears; 2 × propellers; 5,400 shp (4.0 MW) surfaced; 2,740 shp (2.0 MW) submerged
- Speed: 20.25 kn (37.50 km/h) surfaced, 8.75 kn (16.21 km/h) submerged
- Range: 11,000 nmi (20,000 km) at 10 kn (19 km/h)
- Endurance: 48 hours at 2 kn (3.7 km/h) submerged, 75 days on patrol
- Test depth: 400 ft (120 m)
- Complement: 10 officers, 70–71 enlisted
- Armament: As built: 10 × 21-inch (533 mm) torpedo tubes; 6 forward, 4 aft; 24 torpedoes; 1 × 5-inch (127 mm) / 25 caliber deck gun; Bofors 40 mm and Oerlikon 20 mm cannon; As Regulus missile submarine 1955-64: 1 × Regulus missile hangar and launcher; 2 × Regulus I missiles; 6 × 21 inch (533 mm) torpedo tubes (forward); 14 torpedoes

USS Barbero (SS/SSA/SSG-317) was a Balao-class submarine of the United States Navy, named for a family of fishes commonly called surgeon fish.

== Construction and commissioning ==
Barbero was laid down by the Electric Boat Company of Groton, Connecticut on 25 March 1943. She was launched on 12 December 1943, sponsored by Mrs. Katherine R. Keating, and commissioned on 29 April 1944.

== Service history ==
=== World War II ===
Barbero's war operations span the period from 9 August 1944– 2 January 1945, during which she completed two war patrols. She is credited with sinking three Japanese merchant ships totaling 9,126 tons while patrolling in the Java and South China Seas.

Barbero embarked on her first war patrol from Pearl Harbor on 9 August 1944. She reached her patrol area, located east of the central Philippines off San Bernardino Strait, on 24 August. Though she had been stationed there to report and to interdict any attempt by the Japanese to use the strait to contest the Allied invasion of the Palau Islands, they tried no such move. Moreover, during the 31 days that she spent in the area, she encountered no large target. The high point of the patrol came when Barbero lobbed 25 rounds at a radar station on Batag Island with her 5 in (127 mm) deck gun. Though she obtained no definite results, her failure to detect radar activity the following night prompted her claim to have neutralized the station. The submarine cleared the area on 24 September 1944 and headed for western Australia, concluding a disappointing 56-day patrol at Fremantle on 4 October.

After refit and a brief training period, Barbero departed Fremantle on her second war patrol on 26 October. On this patrol, Comdr. Hartman also assumed command of a coordinated attack group (nicknamed a wolfpack) consisting of Barbero, Haddo, and Redfin. The first phase of this two-part patrol lasted from 26 October until 15 November. It was conducted in the Makassar Strait and in the area west of Mindoro. On 2 November, after a lively passage of Lombok Strait during which picket boats and shore batteries fired on her, Barbero sank her first ship, a 2,700-ton troop transport. On 8 November, she sent a 7,500-ton tanker to the bottom during a coordinated attack on a small convoy (consisting of submarine chasers CH-7 and CH-8 escorting oilers Shimotsu Maru and Nichinan Maru No. 2) carried out in cooperation with Redfin. Redfin received credit for sinking the other tanker in the convoy.

Following a three-day stop at Mios Woendi to rearm with torpedoes and perform minor upkeep, Barbero embarked on the second portion of the patrol. This longer phase lasted from 18 November 1944 to 2 January 1945 and was conducted in the South China Sea northeast of Borneo. On 24 December in an attack on an escorted four-ship convoy, a 7,500-ton gasoline tanker was sunk and a second tanker grossing about 5,000 tons was damaged. On Christmas Day, the submarine sank a 4,000-ton Japanese cargo ship. On 27 December, while she attempted the perilous repassage of Lombok Strait, fragments from an aerial bomb that narrowly missed Barbero close aboard aft damaged her port reduction gear. The damage forced her to cover the distance remaining to Fremantle on a single screw, and put her out of action for the remainder of the war. In 68 days away from Fremantle, Barbero returned having sunk four ships totalling 21,700 tons and claiming damage to a fifth of 5,000 tons.

=== Post-war cargo and Regulus missile conversions ===
In September 1945, she was ordered to Mare Island Naval Shipyard – where she underwent pre-inactivation overhaul – and was placed in commission in reserve on 25 April 1946.

Following conversion to a cargo submarine at Mare Island, Barbero was recommissioned, redesignated SSA-317, and assigned to the Pacific Fleet on 31 March 1948. From October 1948 – March 1950, she took part in an experimental program to evaluate her capabilities as a cargo carrier. Experimentation ended in early 1950, and she was decommissioned into the reserve on 30 June 1950.

On 1 February 1955, Barbero entered Mare Island Naval Shipyard for her a conversion under project SCB 118, equipping her to launch the Regulus I nuclear cruise missile. She was thus redesignated SSG-317 and recommissioned on 28 October 1955 under Lt. Cmdr. Samuel T. Bussey as the second submarine equipped with the Regulus missile, Tunny having been converted in 1953. In this role, Barbero was equipped with a hangar housing two missiles and a launcher on the after deck. One of the limitations of Regulus was that the firing submarine had to surface, the missile then being rolled out onto the launcher and fired. Regulus I also required guidance from submarines or other platforms after firing. She operated off the coast of California, firing her first test missile near San Clemente Island on 14 March 1956, until April 1956, when she transited the Panama Canal and joined the Atlantic Fleet, based at Norfolk, Virginia. From there, she served as an integral part in the nation's defense against nuclear war by carrying out early versions of the deterrent patrols that later became a regular feature of the submarine force after the introduction of the fleet ballistic missile submarine. She conducted patrols in the Atlantic for the next three years, under a policy of having one Regulus boat in each ocean.

On 1 July 1959, Barbero was reassigned to the Pacific Fleet's Submarine Squadron 1, based at Pearl Harbor to conduct deterrent patrols in the Pacific due to a shift in policy placing all deployed Regulus assets there. She usually patrolled with Tunny to provide four missiles on station. In January 1962, Barbero entered the Pearl Harbor Naval Shipyard for an extensive five-month overhaul. During that time, members of her crew pursued various fields of training and education at service schools in Hawaii and on the United States West Coast. After concluding the overhaul in June 1962, Barbero carried out local operations and conducted refresher training. She then completed a single deterrent patrol in the latter half of 1962. Barbero conducted another two deterrent patrols in 1963, making liberty calls in East Asian ports at the conclusion of each.

==== Missile Mail ====
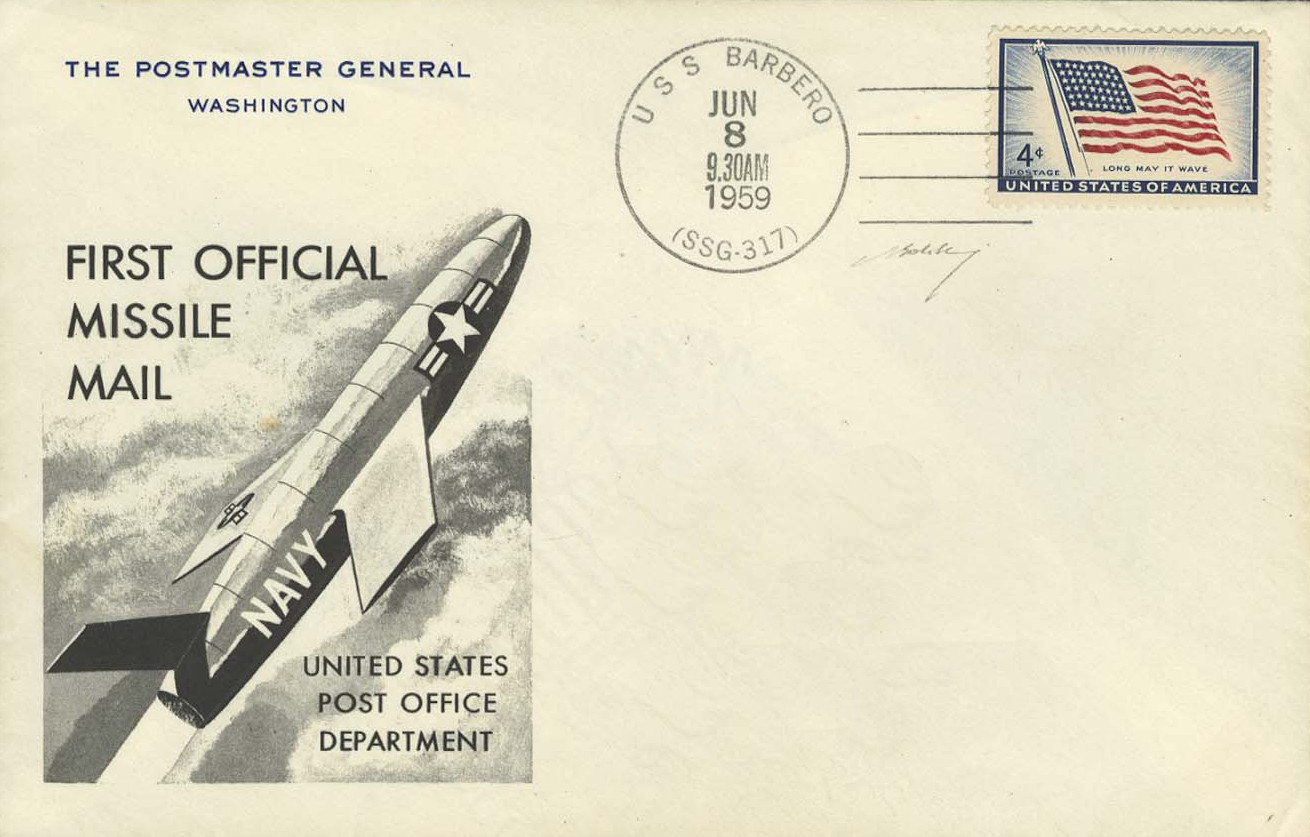

In 1959 Barbero assisted the United States Post Office Department, predecessor of what in 1971 became today's United States Postal Service (USPS), in its search for faster, more efficient forms of mail transportation. The Post Office tried its first and only delivery of "Missile Mail", though the idea of delivering mail by rocket was not new. Shortly before noon on 8 June 1959, off the northern Florida coast under command of her new skipper Robert H. Blount, Barbero fired a Regulus cruise missile towards the Naval Auxiliary Air Station, Mayport, Florida. Twenty-two minutes later the training type missile landed at its target; its training-type warhead having been configured to contain two official USPS mail containers.

The Post Office had officially established a branch post office on Barbero and delivered some 3,000 pieces of mail to it before Barbero left Norfolk, Virginia. The mail consisted entirely of commemorative postal covers addressed to President of the United States Dwight Eisenhower, other government officials, the Postmasters General of all members of the Universal Postal Union, and so on. They contained letters from United States Postmaster General Arthur E. Summerfield. Their postage (four cents domestic, eight cents international) had been cancelled "USS Barbero 8 June 9.30 am 1959" before the boat put to sea. In Mayport, the Regulus was opened and the mail forwarded to the Jacksonville, Florida Post Office for further sorting and routing.

Upon witnessing the missile's landing, Summerfield stated, "This peacetime employment of a guided missile for the important and practical purpose of carrying mail, is the first known official use of missiles by any Post Office Department of any nation." Summerfield proclaimed the event to be "of historic significance to the peoples of the entire world," and predicted that "before man reaches the moon, mail will be delivered within hours from New York to California, to Britain, to India or Australia by guided missiles. We stand on the threshold of rocket mail."

== Decommissioning and disposal ==
Regulus was superseded by the Polaris missile in 1964. Barbero ended her nuclear strategic deterrent patrols and was decommissioned on 30 June 1964. She was struck from the Naval Vessel Registry on 1 July 1964, prior to being used as a target and sunk by the submarine USS Swordfish off Pearl Harbor, Hawaii, on 7 October 1964.

== Awards ==
- Asiatic-Pacific Campaign Medal with two battle stars
- World War II Victory Medal
- National Defense Service Medal
