= SSM-N-9 Regulus II =

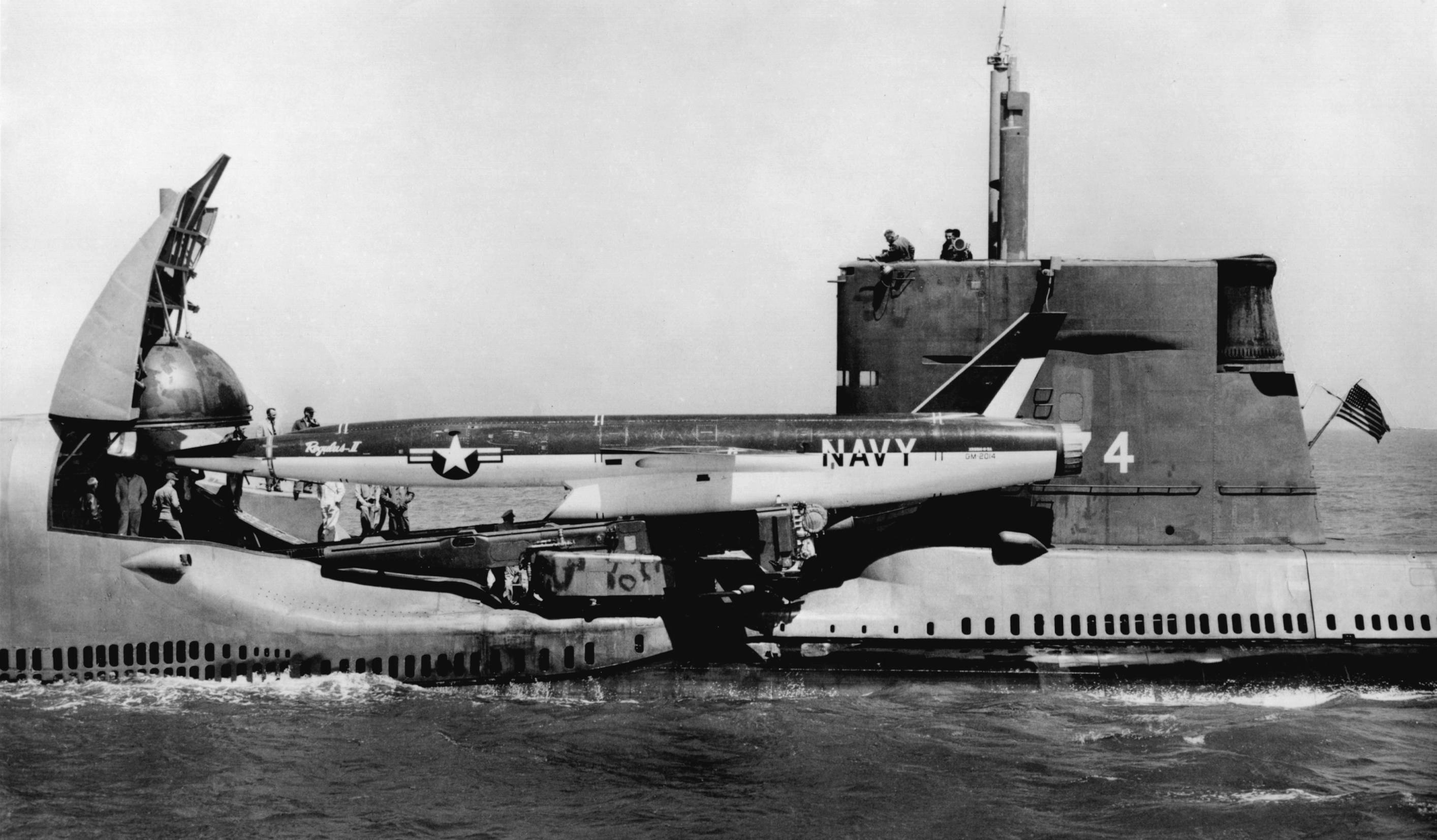
- USS Grayback (SSG-574) preparing to launch a Regulus II missile
- Type: Cruise missile

Production history
- Manufacturer: Chance Vought
- Produced: 1956

Specifications
- Mass: 23,000 pounds (10,000 kg)
- Length: 57 feet 6 inches (17.53 m)
- Diameter: 50 inches (1.3 m)
- Wingspan: 20 feet 1 inch (6.12 m)
- Warhead: W27 Thermonuclear weapon
- Detonation mechanism: air burst or surface burst (air burst – fireball does not reach the ground, usually at least 10,000 feet in altitude, surface burst – fireball touches the ground, less than 10,000 feet in altitude)
- Engine: 1x General Electric J79-GE-3 turbojet 1x Rocketdyne solid-fueled rocket 15,600 lbf (69 kN) + 135,000 lbf (600 kN)
- Operational range: 1,000 nautical miles (1,852 km)
- Flight ceiling: 59,000 feet (18,000 m)
- Maximum speed: M 2.0
- Guidance system: Inertial
- Launch platform: SSG and SSGN class submarines, cruisers

The SSM-N-9 Regulus II was a guided supersonic cruise missile armed with a nuclear warhead, intended for launching from surface ships and submarines of the U.S. Navy (USN).

== History ==
The limitations of the Regulus I were well known by the time it entered service in 1955, so the Navy issued a specification for a surface-launched supersonic shipborne cruise missile, equipped to carry a nuclear warhead, that had greater range, accuracy and resistance to countermeasures.

Development of the Regulus II was well under way when the program was canceled in favor of the UGM-27 Polaris SLBM (Submarine-Launched Ballistic Missile) system, which gave unprecedented accuracy as well as allowing the launch submarine to remain submerged and covert. Prototype and initial production missiles were later converted to KD2U-1 supersonic target drones for the US Navy and the U.S. Air Force, which used the KD2U-1 during tests of the Boeing IM-99/CIM-10 Bomarc SAM (Surface to Air Missile).

The SSM-N-9a Regulus II was redesignated as the RGM-15A in June 1963, nearly five years after the missile program had been terminated. At the same time the KD2U-1 target drone was redesignated as the MQM-15A. Some targets equipped with landing gear were redesignated as GQM-15As.

== Design and development ==
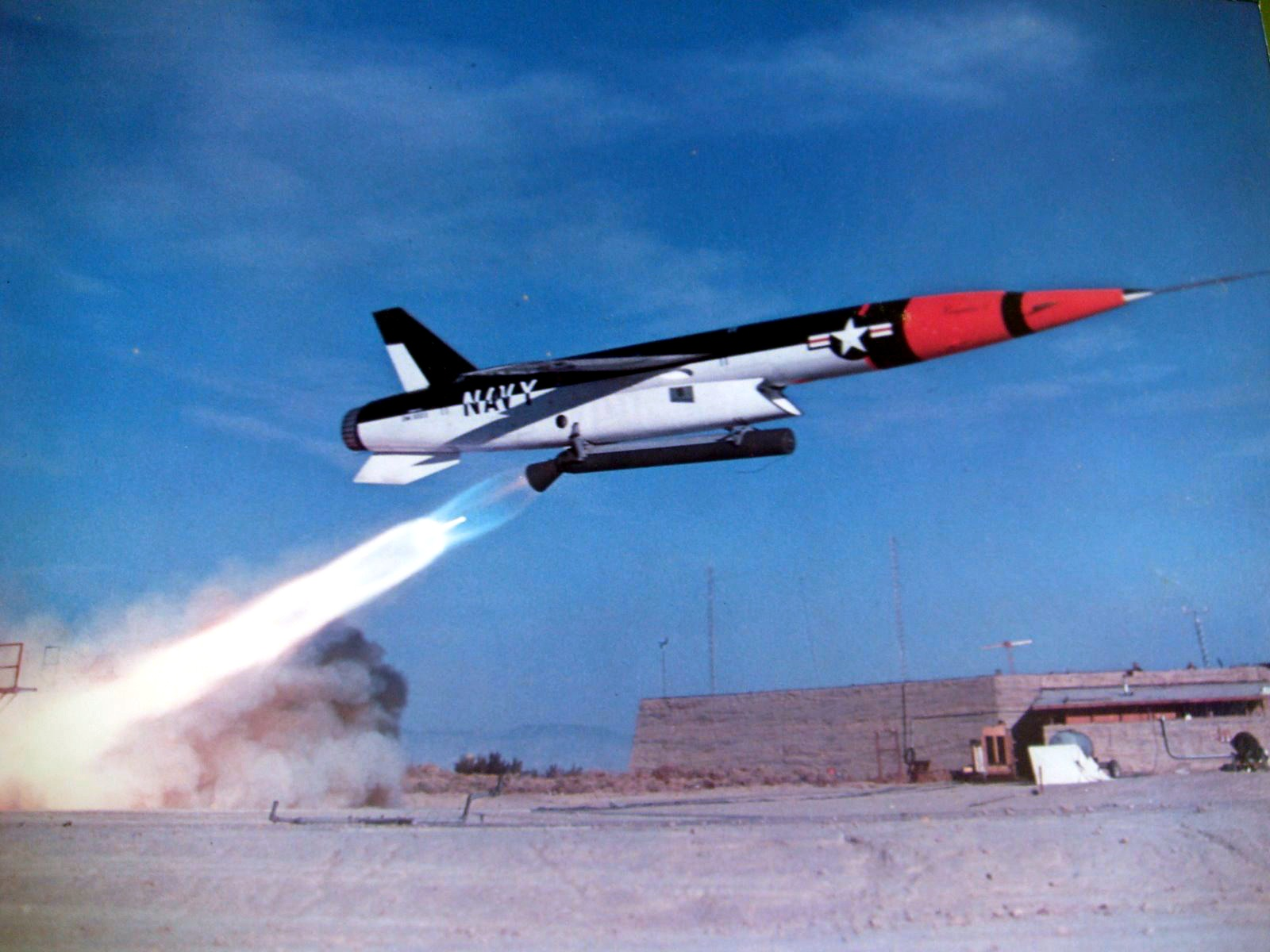
Regulus II test launch in 1957. The swept-forward Ferri-style intake can be seen.

The major drawback of the original Regulus was the use of radio-command guidance, which required a constant radio link with the launch ship / submarine that was relatively easy to interfere with. The earlier missile also suffered from restricted range which required the launch ship to launch the missile close to the target and remain exposed until the missile hit the target. To alleviate these drawbacks, the Regulus II was designed with an inertial navigation system, which required no further input from the launch ship / boat after launch, and a greater range through improved aerodynamics, larger fuel capacity, and a lower specific fuel consumption from its jet engine.

Prototype missiles were built, designated XRSSM-N-9 Regulus II, with retractable landing gear, to allow multiple launches, and Wright J65-W-6 engines and Aerojet General booster, which restricted them to subsonic flight. The first flight of the XRSSM-N-9 took place in May 1956. Beginning in 1958, testing was carried out with the XRSSM-N-9a, equipped with the General Electric J79-GE-3 turbojet and a Rocketdyne solid-fueled rocket booster to allow the entire flight envelope to be explored. Evaluation and training missiles with retractable undercarriage were produced as the YTSSM-N-9a and TSSM-N-9a respectively.

After land-based testing, trials including test missile firings were carried out on board the USS King County (LST-857), which had been modified with the replica of a submarine missile hangar and launching system.

The SSM-N-9 Regulus II missile was intended to be launched from the deck of an SSG (guided missile submarine), and the missile most likely would have been deployed on the two Grayback-class submarines and the USS Halibut (SSGN-587), which were designed for the missile, and possibly eventually on four heavy cruisers that had deployed with Regulus I and 23 other submarines potentially available for conversion. Carrying two Regulus II missiles in a hangar integral with the hull (more on surface ships), submarines and ships equipped with the Regulus II would have been equipped with the SINS (Ship's Inertial Navigation System), allowing the control systems of the missiles to be aligned accurately before launching.

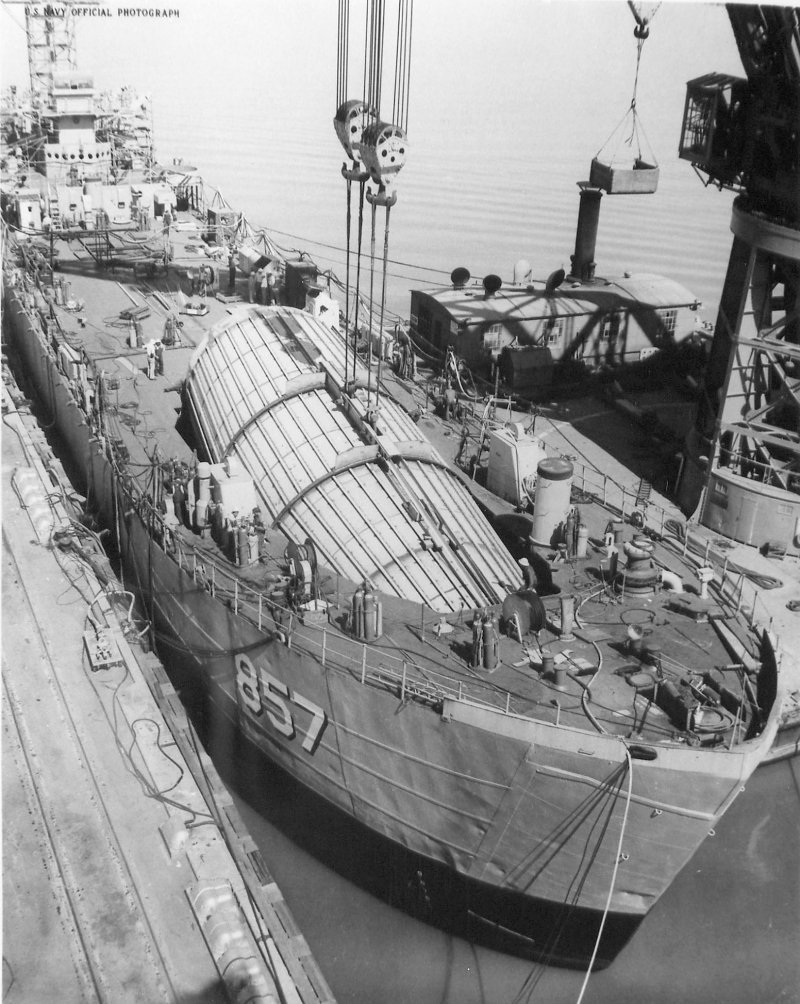
The hangar for the supersonic Regulus II cruise missile being installed aboard USS King County (AG-157), a Landing Ship, Tank (LST) converted to an experimental guided-missile testing ship, on 5 April 1957. USS YD-33 is doing the lifting.

Forty-eight test-flights of Regulus II prototypes were carried out, 30 of which were successful, 14 partially successful and only four failures. A production contract was signed in January 1958 and the only submarine launch was carried out from USS Grayback in September 1958.

Due to the high cost of the missiles (approx one million dollars each), budgetary pressure, and the emergence of the SLBM, the Regulus missile program was terminated on 19 November 1958. Support for the program was finally withdrawn on 18 December 1958, when Secretary of the Navy Thomas S. Gates cancelled the project. At the time of the cancelation, Vought had completed 20 missiles with 27 more on the production line.

== Description ==
The airframe followed contemporary aircraft construction techniques, with weight savings from the use of advanced materials and the short airborne life of the missile. The fuselage was essentially tubular, tapering to a point at the nose, housing the guidance equipment, warhead and systems equipment. The engine was fed with air through a distinctive wedge shaped intake under the center fuselage known as a Ferri scoop. Its swept wings attached to its fuselage at the middle position, roughly halfway along its length, and a large swept fin attached to the top of the fuselage at the rear which was sometimes augmented by a large ventral fin at the extreme rear of the fuselage.

Primary control of the Regulus II was through the use of elevons fitted to the outer half of the wing trailing-edges, as the missile was not fitted with a tailplane, and a rudder fitted to the trailing edge of the fin. Flaps were fitted to the inner half of the trailing edge for use during takeoff. Additional stability and control in pitch was provided by small trapezoidal canard foreplanes near the nose of the fuselage.

To launch the missile, the carrier vessel had to surface and deploy the missile and launch apparatus, which consisted of a zero length launcher. Once deployed, the missile had to be linked to the submarine or ship's navigation system to align the inertial navigation system and input target co-ordinates. With the navigation system ready and launch authorization given, the missile engine would be run-up to full power with afterburner and the large solid-fueled rocket booster ignited, immediately the missile would leave the zero length launcher and continue to the target autonomously.

== Regulus target drones ==
Suitable missiles from the development program and production line were converted to supersonic target drones as the KD2U-1, later redesignated as the MQM-15A and GQM-15A. These targets were used for training of BOMARC surface-to-air missile crews firing from Santa Rosa Island, Florida, and controlled by the Montgomery Air Defense Sector, Gunter Air Force Base, Montgomery, Alabama. The KD2U-1 targets were launched from the Eglin Gulf Test Range base near Ft. Walton Beach, Florida. Drone flights at Eglin commenced on 3 September 1959, making 46 flights with 13 missiles. After the BOMARC tests the remaining missiles were moved to Naval Station Roosevelt Roads, Puerto Rico by 30 September 1961, where flights were begun to test Tartar, Terrier, and Talos surface-to-air missiles. Upon completion of the testing in Puerto Rico in 1963, the Regulus II drones were moved to NAS Point Mugu, California, where they remained in use until December 1965.

== Variants ==
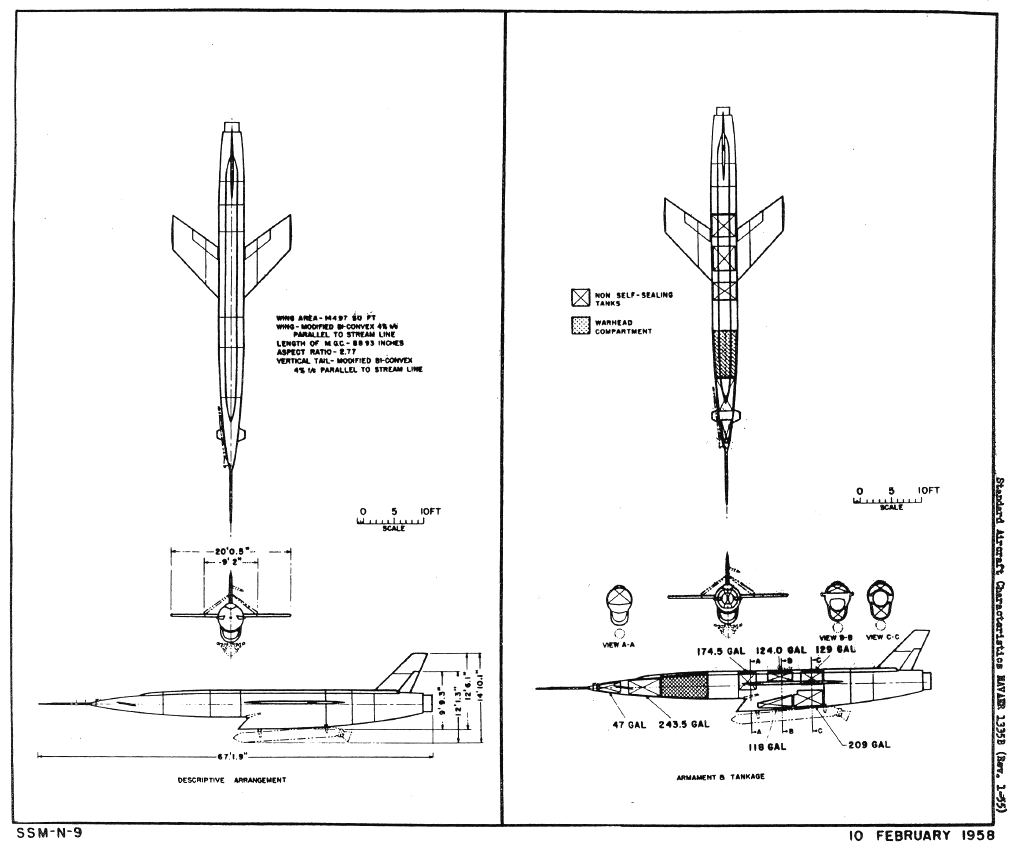

SSM-N-9 Regulus II
The basic designation of the missile, pre-1964.
SSM-N-9a Regulus II
The designation of production missiles, pre-1964.
XRSSM-N-9 Regulus II
Prototype missiles fitted with retractable landing gear for land based development flights, powered by Wright J65 turbojet engines and Aerojet General booster rockets.
XRSSM-N-9a
Prototype missiles fitted with retractable landing gear for land based development flights, powered by General Electric J79 turbojet engines and Rocketdyne booster rockets.
YTSSM-N-9a
Development Training missiles with retractable landing gear.
TSSM-N-9a
Production training missiles with retractable landing gear.
KD2U-1
Pre-1962 designation of the target drone version of the Regulus II
RQM-15A
KD2U-1Regulus II target re-designated in April 1963.
MQM-15A
KD2U-1 Target drones used for research and as targets for the IM-99 Bomarc SAM.
GQM-15A
Gear equipped KD2U-1 target drones re-designated.

== Operators ==
United States

- United States Air Force
- United States Navy

== Surviving missiles ==
Frontiers of Flight Museum, Dallas Love Field, Texas
A Regulus II missile
Point Mugu Missile Park, Naval Air Station Point Mugu, California
The museum's collection includes both a Regulus and a Regulus II missile
The U.S. Veterans Memorial Museum, Huntsville, Alabama
A Regulus II missile handling training device (non-flyable)
USS Growler Intrepid Sea, Air & Space Museum, New York, NY
A Regulus I missile displayed in launch position on a Regulus-equipped submarine; not a Regulus II.

== See also ==
- List of missiles
- SSBN Deterrent Patrol insignia
