= Mark 27 nuclear bomb =

American nuclear weapon

The Mark 27 nuclear bomb and closely related W27 warhead were two American thermonuclear weapon designs from the late 1950s.

== History and design ==
The Mark 27 was designed by the University of California Radiation Laboratory (UCRL; now Lawrence Livermore National Laboratory) starting in the mid-1950s. The basic design concept competed with the Los Alamos Scientific Laboratory (LASL; now Los Alamos National Laboratory) design that would become the Mark 28 / B-28 nuclear bomb and W28 warhead. The Mark 27 was roughly twice as heavy as the Mark 28/B-28/W28 family of thermonuclear weapons. The Mark 27/W27 devices had a yield of 1,900 kilotonnes of TNT (7,900 TJ) (Note: The W27 was the only warhead for Regulus) versus the 1,100 kilotonnes of TNT (4,600 TJ) (later 1,450 kilotonnes of TNT (6,100 TJ)) of the Mark 28/B-28/W28 weapons.

The Mark 27 and W27 were produced from 1958; both were retired by 1964, as the Kennedy administration began to redirect funding from crewed nuclear bomber programs. Both US Navy bombers carrying the Mark 27 bomb, the Douglas A-3 Skywarrior and North American A-5 Vigilante, were repurposed from the nuclear strike role to tanker, electronic countermeasure (A-3) or reconnaissance (A-5) roles by 1965.

The W27 warhead was 31 inches (790 mm) in diameter by 75 inches (1,900 mm) long, and weighed 2,800 pounds (1,300 kg). 20 W27 warheads were produced for the United States Navy SSM-N-9 Regulus II cruise missiles. The W-27 warhead was withdrawn from service along with the Regulus cruise missile in 1964.

The Mark 27 bomb was 30 inches (760 mm) in diameter by 124 to 142 inches (3,100 to 3,600 mm) long, depending on specific version. The three versions weighed 3,150 to 3,300 pounds (1,430 to 1,500 kg). 700 Mark 27 bombs were produced.

== See also ==
- List of nuclear weapons
- SSM-N-9 Regulus II
