= Grayback (fish) =

Grayback is a general name given to several species of fish from North America, such as the alewife, cisco and Menominee whitefish.

== Geographic distribution ==
Found on the Atlantic coast from the Gulf of St. Lawrence and Nova Scotia to North Carolina, in streams and rivers, the Great Lakes, and in the Seneca and Cayuga Lakes.
