= Regulus missile submarines =

Group of submarines operated by the US Navy

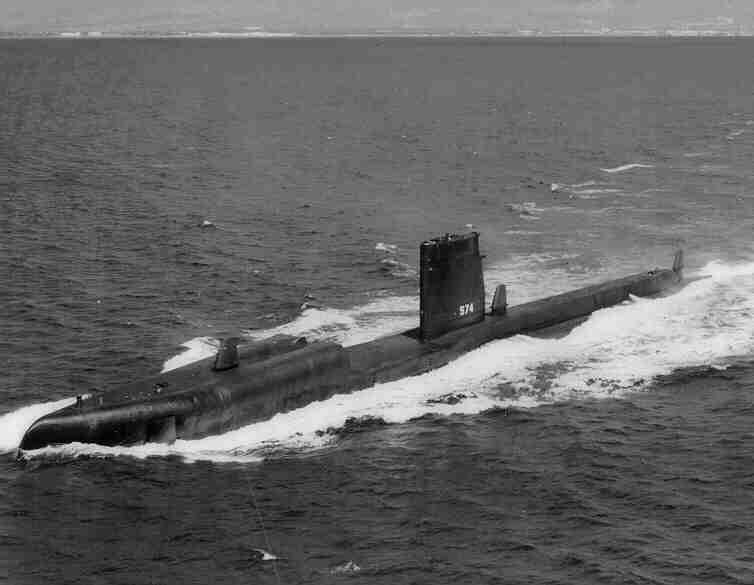
- USS Grayback, one of the five submarines that operated Regulus missiles

Class overview
- Name: USS Tunny; USS Barbero; Grayback-class; USS Halibut
- Operators: United States Navy
- Succeeded by: 41 for Freedom (strategic deterrent); Ohio-class (cruise missile)
- Built: 6 March 1953 to 4 January 1960
- Planned: 16
- Completed: 5
- Active: 0
- Lost: 0
- Retired: 5
- Preserved: 1

General characteristics
- Length: 311–350 ft (95–107 m) (depending on class)
- Beam: 27–29 feet (8.2–8.8 m)
- Draft: 17–28 feet (5.2–8.5 m)
- Complement: 5-9 officers, 54-88 enlisted
- Armament: 6-10 × 21-inch (533 mm) torpedo tubes; 2-5 SSM-N-8 Regulus or; 2-4 SSM-N-9 Regulus II (Grayback / Halibut classes)

The Regulus missile submarines were a group of submarines operated by the United States Navy (US Navy) capable of carrying the Regulus cruise missile. Between 1959 and 1964, a total of five boats were used to undertake the first submarine-based nuclear deterrent patrols by the United States. Regulus submarines were used for this task until 1964, when sufficient ballistic missile submarines carrying the Polaris ballistic missile became available.

== History ==
=== Regulus missile development and submarine use ===
In May 1947, the United States Army (US Army) awarded a contract for the development of a guided cruise missile, the MGM-1 Matador. The US Navy saw this as a threat to its role in the operation of guided missiles, and launched its own development program for a turbojet powered missile, which it called Regulus. In August 1947, specifications for the Regulus project were issued:

- Be capable of carrying a 3,000 lb (1,400 kg) warhead
- Have a range of 500 mi (430 nmi; 800 km)
- Have a maximum speed of Mach 0.85
- A CEP of 0.5% of the maximum range

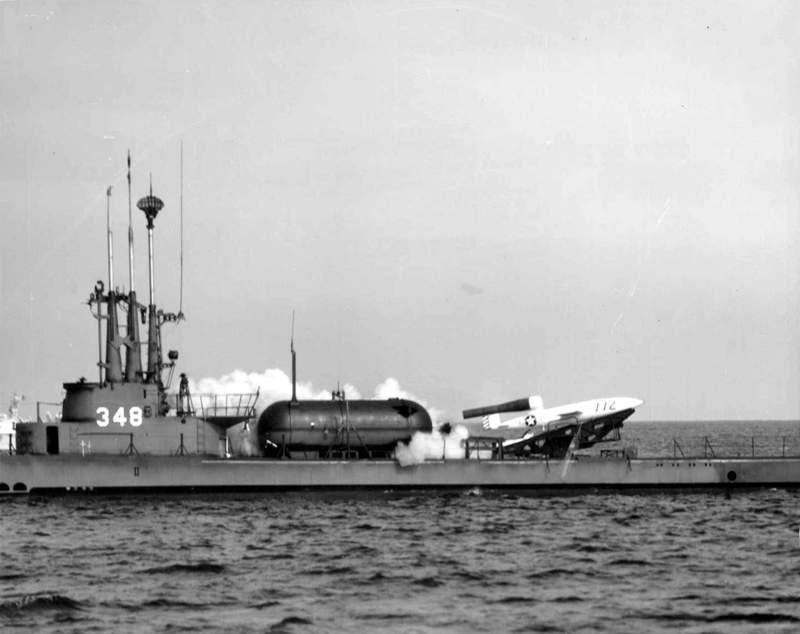
JB-2 Loon missile ready for launching from Cusk

The Navy had been experimenting with guided missiles since 1945, using the JB-2 Loon, an American copy of the German V-1. In 1947, a pair of Balao-class submarines, USS Carbonero and USS Cusk, were converted to allow operation of the JB-2, and a test program of submarine launches of the weapon began which ran until 1953.

The Regulus missile itself was 30 ft (9.1 m) long, 4 ft (1.2 m) in diameter, had a wingspan of 10 ft (3.0 m), and weighed between 10,000 and 12,000 lb (4,500 and 5,400 kg). Guidance was provided by remote control, with at least two control stations required for operation of the weapon, which could be installed on submarines, ships or chase aircraft. The first Regulus launch took place in March 1951, using a specially converted test missile fitted with an undercarriage to allow for easy recovery. At the same time, the Navy began consideration of the use of submarines armed with cruise missiles, and in 1953 recommissioned a World War II vintage Gato-class submarine, USS Tunny, for conversion into its first cruise missile submarine. Tunny was initially employed as a more advanced testbed for the use of cruise missiles from submarines than the previous boats, Carbonero and Cusk, as she was fitted with a specially designed missile hangar located aft of her sail. This pressurised, watertight installation allowed Tunny to be able to submerge with the missiles on board, and was connected via an access trunk to the boat itself, allowing the missiles to be prepared while the submarine was still under water.

=== Missile submarines ===
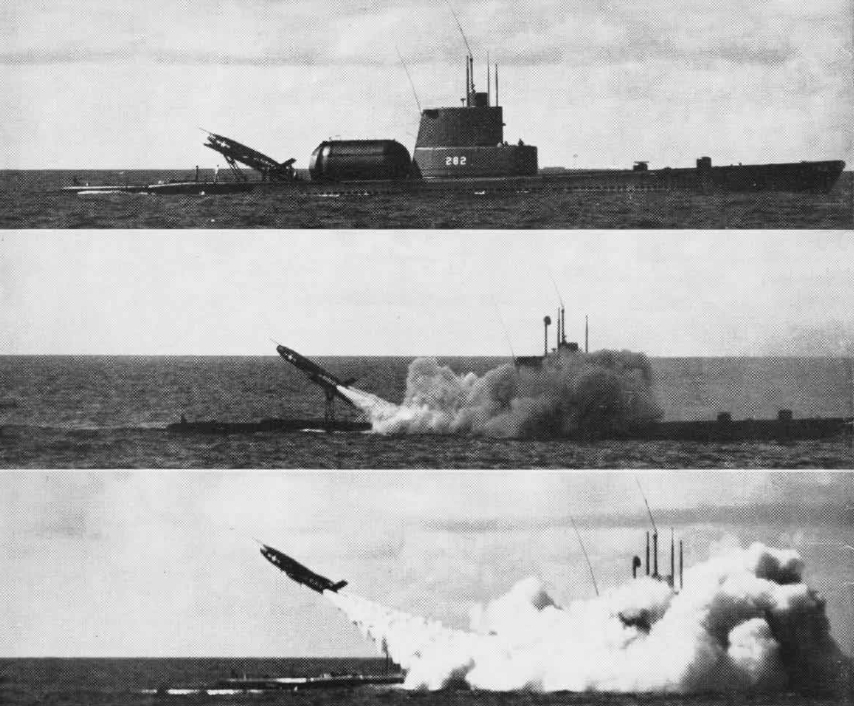
Tunny launching a Regulus missile - the cylindrical installation is the missile hangar

Following her conversion, Tunny began a test program, which saw the first Regulus launch from a submarine take place on 15 July 1953. At the time, Tunny had not had the missile guidance system installed, which meant she had to operate in conjunction with a ship or submarine capable of controlling the missile once it had been launched; the installation of the guidance equipment was undertaken in early 1954, following which Tunny was capable of independent operations with the Regulus. At this point, the boat began being used to develop and trial the operational use of Regulus. At the same time, plans began for the conversion of a second submarine, USS Barbero, for the carriage of the missile. Barbero was chosen as she had already undergone a conversion to a cargo-carrying vessel, and thus did not require major modifications to install the missile hangar or equipment. Barbero was commissioned following her conversion in October 1955 and, following sea trials, entered operational testing alongside Tunny, conducting her first Regulus launch in March 1956.

At the time that Regulus began development, the US Navy was looking for ways that it could deliver nuclear weapons using its own resources. In the late 1940s, the Navy had planned a class of supercarriers, with the first ordered as USS United States. These ships would be large enough to carry strategic bombers of the size required to carry the nuclear weapons of the time, the specification of which crystallised into the Douglas A-3 Skywarrior. However, the difficulty in designing aircraft of the required size to carry nuclear weapons, but capable of operating from the deck of a carrier, which became more of an issue when United States was cancelled, led to the Navy looking at other options for nuclear weapons delivery, and focusing on the concept of submarine launched nuclear missiles, with Regulus a prime candidate. The missile was designed to be able to accommodate the W5 nuclear warhead, before it underwent a redesign to allow carriage of the W27 thermonuclear warhead. The capability of submarines to carry nuclear weapons was seen as significant, as it was possible for submarines to remain undetected on station, with the threat of nuclear retaliation potentially ever present without their presence being known. So, in 1953, the US Navy, with the success of the test programme conducted using Tunny and Barbero, ordered a pair of larger missile submarines capable of carrying twice the number of missiles each. Originally planned as sisters to the attack submarine USS Darter, the two boats, Grayback and Growler, were converted while under construction through the addition of a section containing the missile hangar onto the bow (as opposed to an external installation in the original Regulus boats).

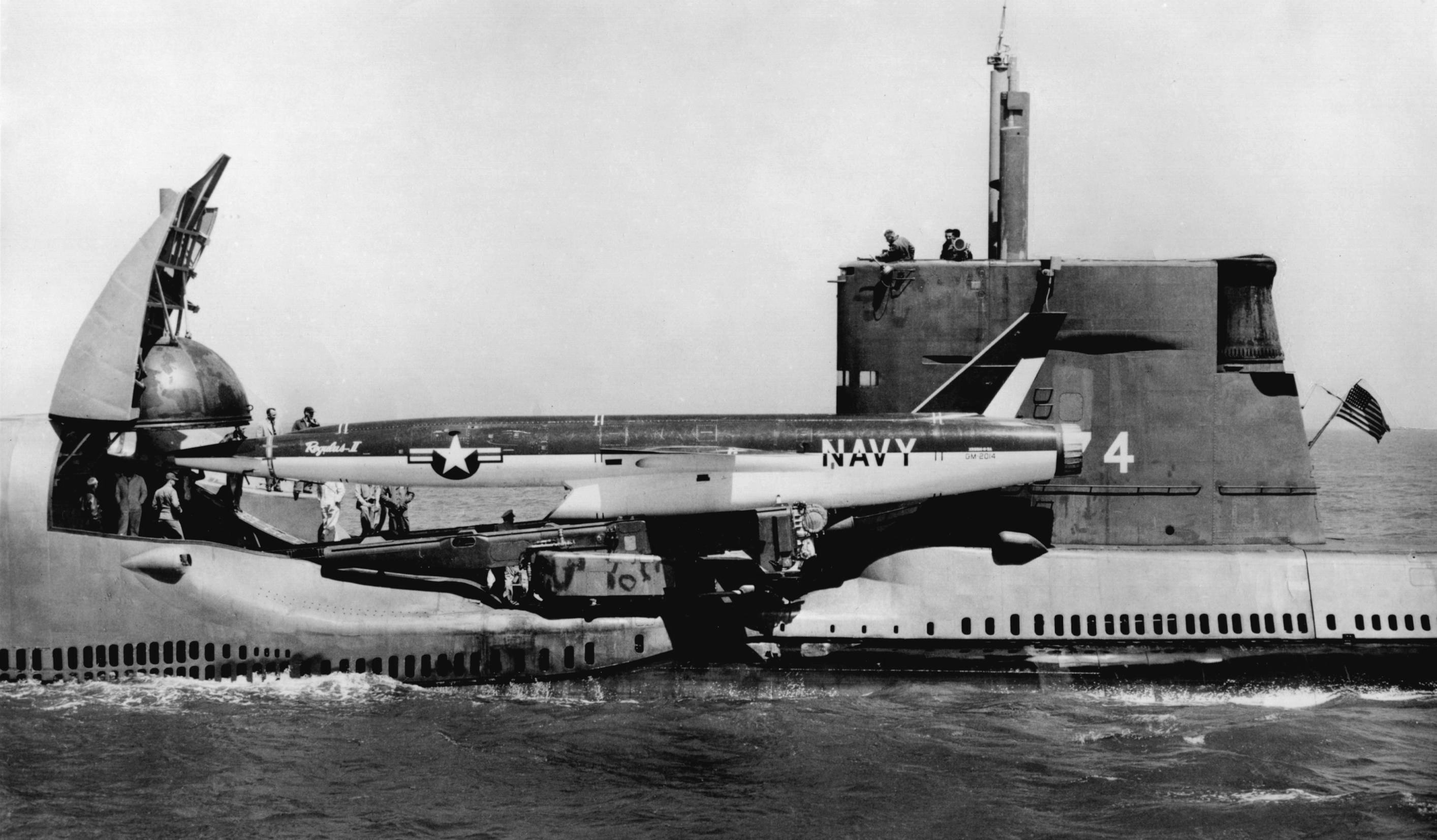
A Regulus II missile being prepared for launch from Grayback

In addition to their being built to accommodate an increased number of missiles over Tunny and Barbero, the Grayback-class boats were also designed to be able to test what was intended as the second generation cruise missile, which was being developed under the name Regulus II. The rationale for the development of a new missile came from the limitations of the original Regulus - subsonic speed, low range, and the remote control guidance system, which meant that the missile had to stay within range either of its launch vessel, or a platform containing the remote control installation. So, the US Navy ordered the development of a new missile system that eliminated these issues. Regulus II had a range of 1,000 mi (870 nmi; 1,600 km), could fly at Mach 2, and was equipped with its own inertial navigation system that required no input either from the vessel that had launched it, or any other vessels or aircraft en route to its target. The size of the missile meant that the new submarines could only carry a pair of Regulus II missiles each, as opposed to four of the original Regulus airframes. In September 1958, six months after commissioning, Grayback conducted the first successful launch of a Regulus II from a submarine.

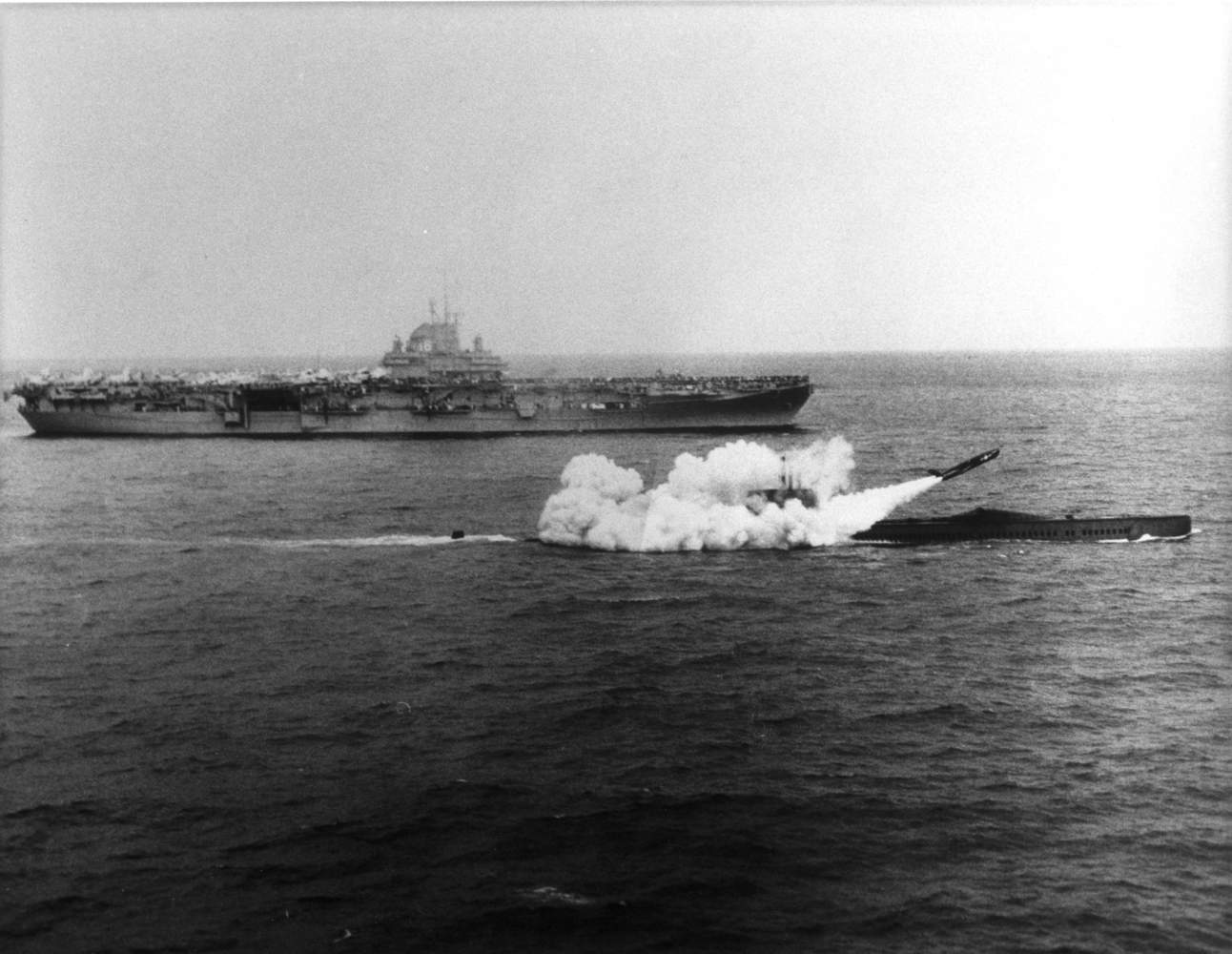
Halibut launching a Regulus in 1960; the aircraft carrier alongside is Lexington

However, in spite of the success of the Regulus II test program, the disadvantages of cruise missiles were becoming evident, particularly as the project to develop a submarine launched ballistic missile (SLBM), which had begun in the mid-1950s, was achieving success with the UGM-27 Polaris. As a consequence, the US Navy elected to end the development of nuclear armed cruise missiles for use on submarines, and cancelled Regulus II at the end of 1958.

A further submarine designed to accommodate Regulus, USS Halibut, was laid down in 1957. Halibut was originally designed as a diesel-electric boat, but during the design stage, this was changed to a nuclear propulsion system. Designed from the start to operate cruise missiles, Halibut had a refined hangar design compared to that of the Grayback-class. Halibut was also planned as a platform for the Regulus II, but this was cancelled just over two weeks prior to the boat entering service. When Halibut eventually entered service, she was capable of carrying up to five Regulus missiles, and undertook the first launch of a guided missile from a nuclear submarine during her initial shakedown cruise in March 1960.

=== Regulus submarines as nuclear deterrent ===
In 1956, while the test program was still under way, the US Navy instituted a policy of keeping one of its then existing cruise missile submarines in each ocean. Tunny was deployed to the Pacific Fleet at Pearl Harbor, while Barbero was sent to the Atlantic Fleet home-ported at Norfolk. As part of the testing phase, both boats undertook the first submarine based nuclear deterrent patrols. Subsequently, with the ramping up of the nuclear arms race between the United States and the Soviet Union that came following both superpowers successfully launching SLBMs, in 1958 Barbero was moved back to the Pacific to join Tunny, and the newly commissioned Grayback and Growler, to form Submarine Squadron One. Both Cusk and Carbonero were also retained as part of the Regulus programme and transferred to Pearl Harbor, as they had retained the guidance equipment to control the missile, despite having the launching equipment removed. This formed a major part of the US Navy's contribution to the nation's overall strategic deterrent, with the policy to continually have a minimum of four Regulus missiles at sea in the Western Pacific at all times.

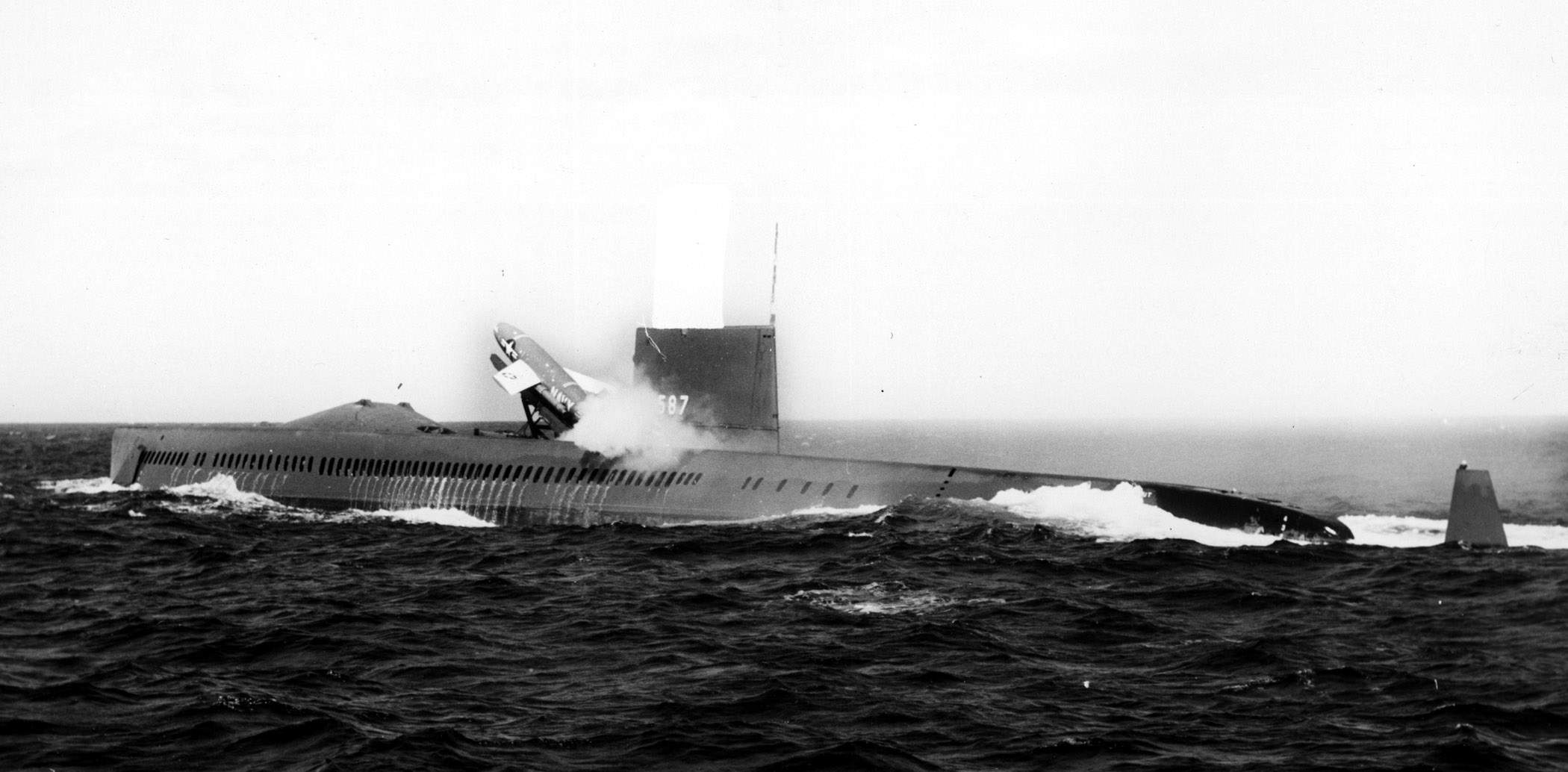
Halibut with a Regulus missile on the launcher

Following the constitution of Squadron 1, Tunny departed on the first operational deterrent patrol on 23 October 1959. Halibut meanwhile joined the Pacific Fleet in November 1960, becoming the fifth and final Regulus submarine to serve in the US Navy. The policy of keeping four missiles at sea at all times meant that Grayback, Growler and Halibut could undertake Western Pacific cruises alone, while Tunny and Barbero, both only capable of accommodating a pair of missiles, had to be at sea simultaneously. The system was found to have significant limitations, not just concerning those inherent in the Regulus missile itself. In order to launch a missile, the submarine was forced to surface and have a missile removed from the hangar to be loaded onto the launcher. This operation was undertaken manually on the two smallest boats, was partly automated on the second two, and fully automated on Halibut, but still took approximately 15 minutes to complete, during which time the submarine was on the surface and potentially vulnerable to air and sea attack. Once the missile was launched, the submarine was able to dive, but had to remain at periscope depth in order for the remote control system to operate and guide the missile to its target. Additionally, although the nuclear-powered Halibut was able to maintain station constantly for the duration of her cruise, the four diesel-powered boats needed to make refuelling stopovers during the periods that they were at sea, in order to maximise their time on station - these stops would usually take place either in Adak in Alaska, or at Midway Island. Nevertheless, between October 1959 and July 1964, when Halibut returned to Hawaii following its final patrol, the Regulus force had maintained at least one submarine constantly on station in the Western Pacific in the strategic deterrent role.

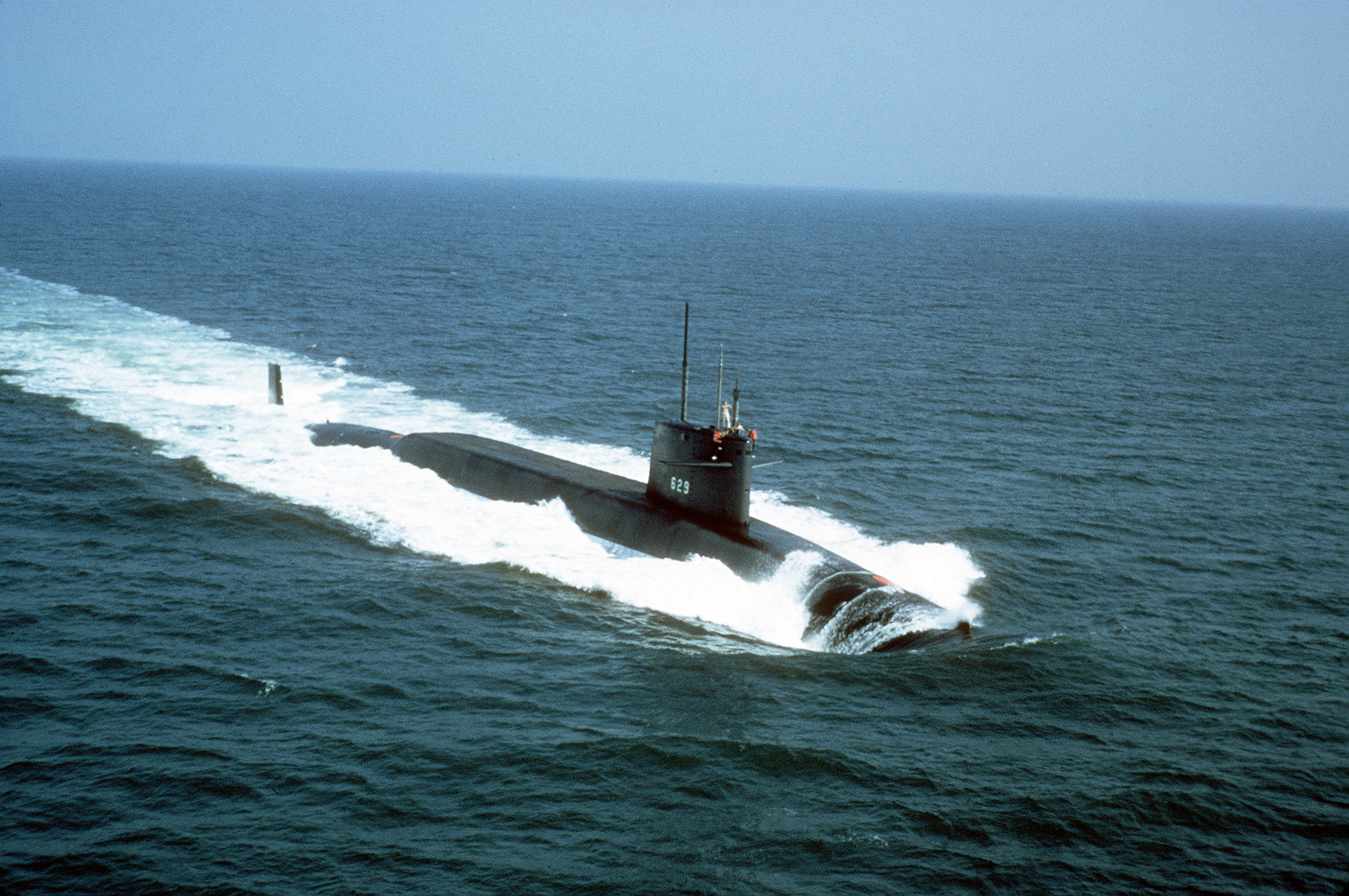
USS Daniel Boone - the first ballistic missile submarine to be deployed to the Pacific

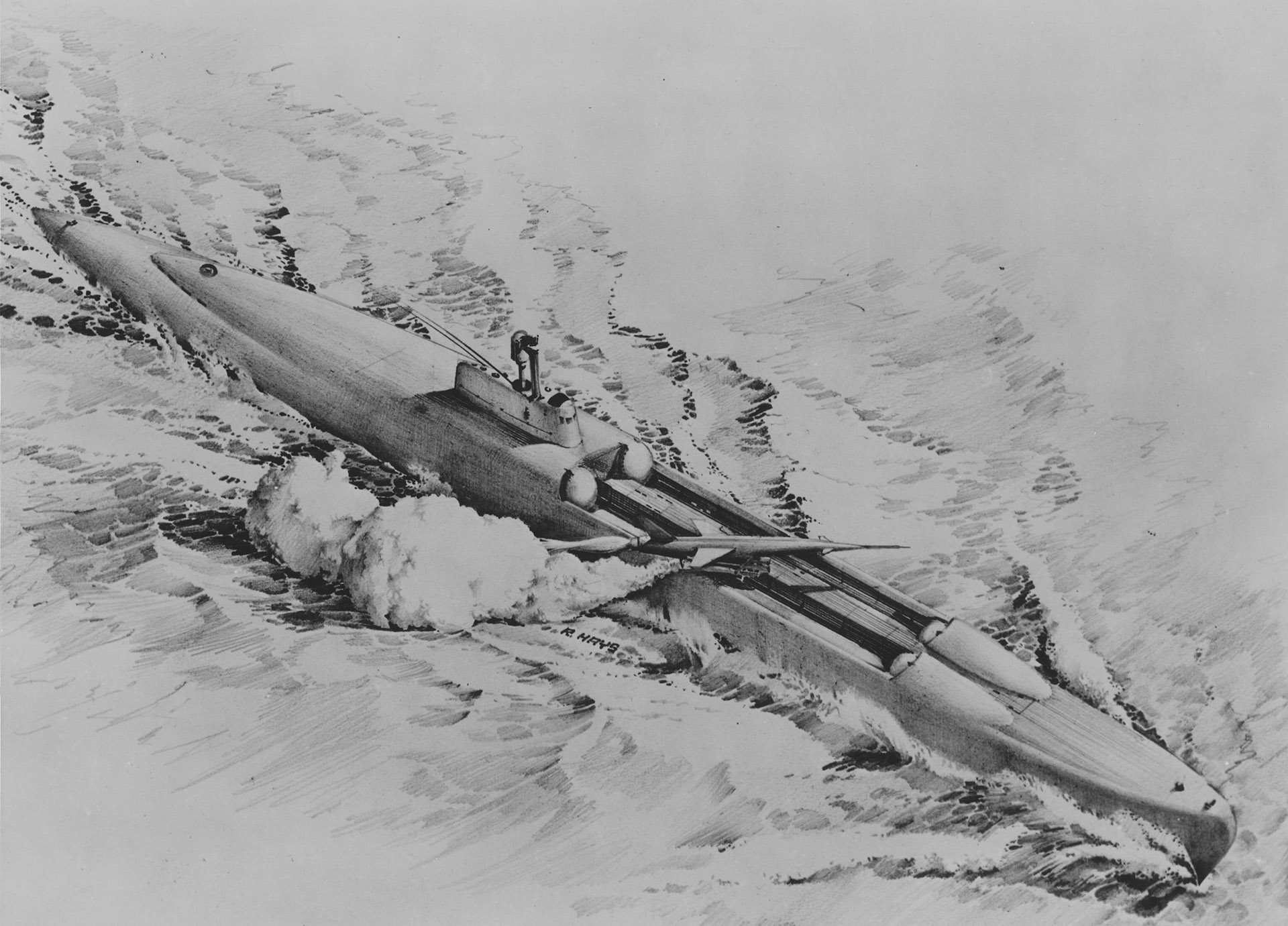
Artist's impression of planned Permit-class SSGN

Regulus II had been cancelled as the limitations of using cruise missiles became more apparent. The US Navy had therefore elected to alter the thinking behind the deployment of submarine-based nuclear weapons to ballistic missiles. The Navy's ballistic missile program had begun in 1955 when it was instructed to develop the Jupiter IRBM for use at sea. However, at a conference on nuclear weapons development in 1956, it was announced that the technology to create a lightweight thermonuclear warhead would be available by the end of the 1950s, which led to the eventual development of the SLBM in the form of Polaris. In 1957, the attack submarine USS Scorpion, then under construction, was selected for conversion into the US Navy's first ballistic missile submarine. This was accomplished by inserting an additional 130 ft (40 m) section containing a compartment capable of holding up to 16 Polaris missiles. The new boat, renamed as USS George Washington, entered service in December 1959 as part of the Atlantic Fleet, and departed on her first deterrent patrol in November 1960. The Regulus submarines retained responsibility for the strategic deterrent in the Pacific until the establishment of Submarine Squadron Fifteen in September 1963, which was formed as the command organisation for the first ballistic missile submarines intended to be stationed in the Pacific. In April 1964, having completed a submerged transit from California, USS Daniel Boone arrived at Pearl Harbor for commissioning. Daniel Boone was followed into service over the next four months by Tecumseh, Ulysses S. Grant and Stonewall Jackson. These four boats formed the core of the planned Pacific ballistic missile deterrent force. At the same time as Squadron 15 began working up, Squadron 1 began a draw down - Grayback and Growler, having completed their final patrols in late 1963, were withdrawn to California in May 1964; Tunny and Barbero completed their final patrols in March and April 1964, while on 7 May Halibut sailed from Pearl Harbor on the last Regulus missile deterrent patrol. Two and a half months later, on 21 July 1964, Halibut put in for the last time as a nuclear deterrent boat, with responsibility for the nuclear deterrent in the Pacific passing to the ballistic missile submarines of Squadron 15. (Note: Squadron 15 was forward deployed to Guam in October 1964. Daniel Boone was the first boat to be deployed, departing on her first deterrent patrol on 25 December 1964.) Over the course of the five years of use of Regulus as part of the strategic nuclear deterrent, the five boats conducted a total of 41 patrols.

=== Cancelled boats ===
Prior to the cancellation of Regulus II, plans had been in place to build a significant force of cruise missile submarines - fiscal planning estimates intended for three nuclear-powered boats to be funded in 1958, one in 1959, and seven subsequent to this for a total of 12 SSGNs (including Halibut) in addition to the intended 40-45 SSBNs. To this end, three submarines were ordered in 1958, and one in 1959 - Permit, Plunger, Barb (Note: SSGN-596 was initially ordered as Pollack, with SSN-603 being named as Barb; the two names were swapped in July 1959) and Dace. These were an improved design over Halibut, with hangar space for up to four Regulus II missiles; two in the bow, and another two amidships either side of the sail - having the missiles hangared along the length of the boat reduced the potential flooding risk that the design of both the Grayback-class and Halibut, which had all of their missiles hangared on the bow, presented. However, three months after the successful first launch of a Regulus II missile from the deck of Grayback, it was decided to cancel nuclear cruise missile development to focus solely on Polaris, which was seen as a superior strategic weapon system, while the potential use of Regulus II as a tactical nuclear or conventional weapon was discounted thanks to the US Navy's large fleet of aircraft carriers. As a consequence, the Permit-class missile boats were cancelled and reordered as Thresher-class attack submarines. (Note: Following the loss of Thresher in April 1963, the Thresher-class was renamed after Permit, the second boat commissioned.)

== List of boats ==
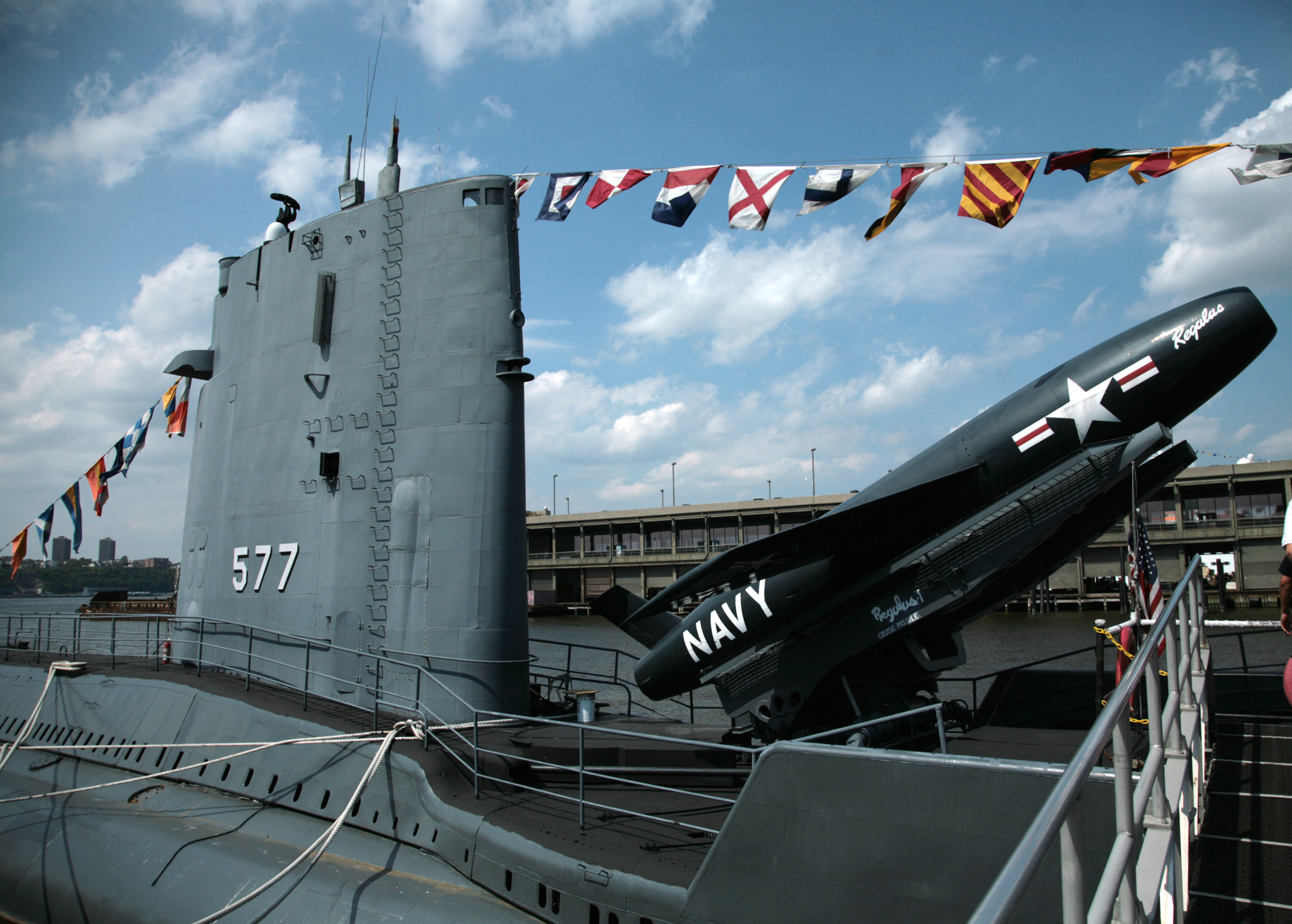
Growler, with a Regulus missile on deck, on display in New York

| Name | Preserved | In Commission | Regulus | | Regulus II | | No. of patrols | Post-Regulus use? |
| Name | Preserved | In Commission | Yes/No | No. of missiles | Yes/No | No. of missiles | No. of patrols | Post-Regulus use? |
Missile boats
| Tunny | ✗ | 1953 - 1964 | ✓ | 2 | ✗ | | 9 (Note: In addition to the boat's nine operational patrols, Tunny undertook an additional, unscheduled patrol in July 1958 as part of the US Navy's response to the crisis in Lebanon.) | ✓ |
| Tunny | ✗ | 1965 - 1970^{1} | ✓ | 2 | ✗ | | 9 | ✓ |
| Barbero | ✗ | 1955 - 1964 | ✓ | 2 | ✗ | | 8 | ✗ |
| Grayback | ✗ | 1958 - 1964 | ✓ | 4 | ✓ | 2 | 9 | ✓ |
| Grayback | ✗ | 1968 - 1984^{1} | ✓ | 4 | ✓ | 2 | 9 | ✓ |
| Growler | ✓ | 1958 - 1964 | ✓ | 4 | ✓ | 2 | 8 | ✗ |
| Halibut | ✗ | 1960 - 1964 | ✓ | 5 | ✓ | 4 | 7 | ✓ |
| Halibut | ✗ | 1965 - 1976^{1} | ✓ | 5 | ✓ | 4 | 7 | ✓ |
Guidance boats
| Carbonero | ✗ | 1947 - 1953^{2} | ✗ | | ✗ | | 2 | ✓ |
| Carbonero | ✗ | 1953 - 1962 | ✗ | | ✗ | | 2 | ✓ |
| Carbonero | ✗ | 1962 - 1970^{3} | ✗ | | ✗ | | 2 | ✓ |
| Cusk | ✗ | 1946 - 1954^{2} | ✗ | | ✗ | | 3 | ✓ |
| Cusk | ✗ | 1954 - 1961 | ✗ | | ✗ | | 3 | ✓ |
| Cusk | ✗ | 1961 - 1969^{4} | ✗ | | ✗ | | 3 | ✓ |

1: As special operations boat
2: As cruise missile test platform launching LGV-N-2 Loon
3: As test operations support boat
4: As attack submarine

=== USS Tunny ===
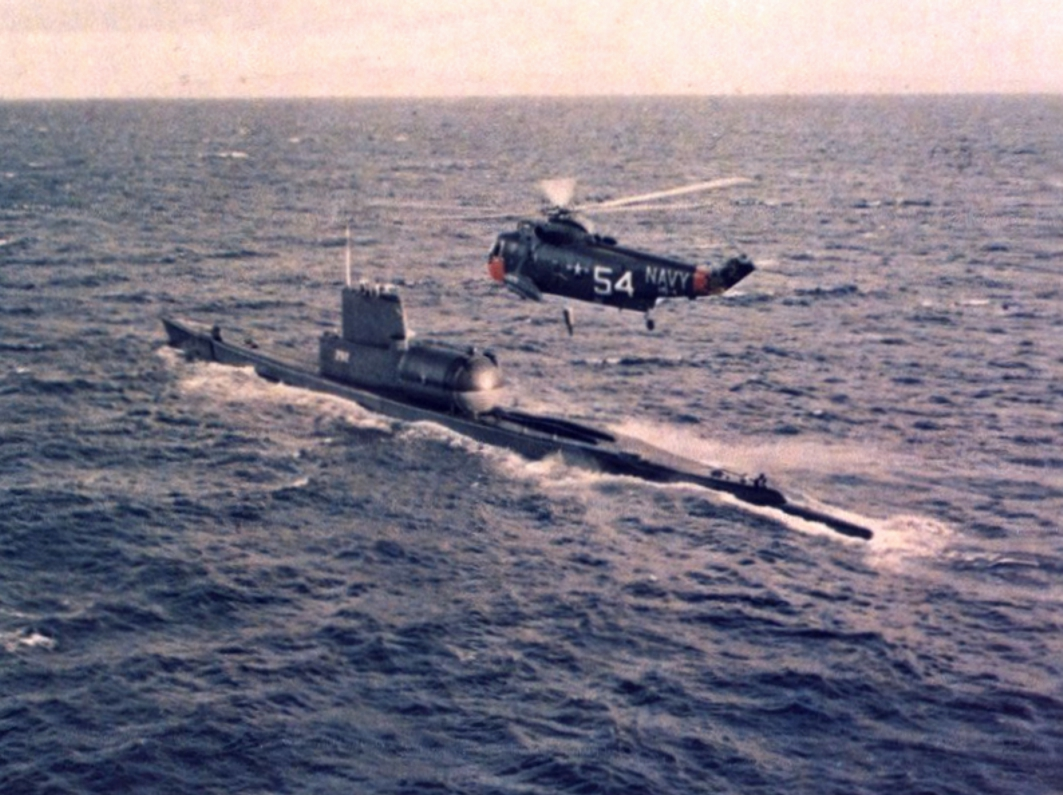
Tunny at sea in 1964, alongside a helicopter of HS-4 attached to USS Yorktown

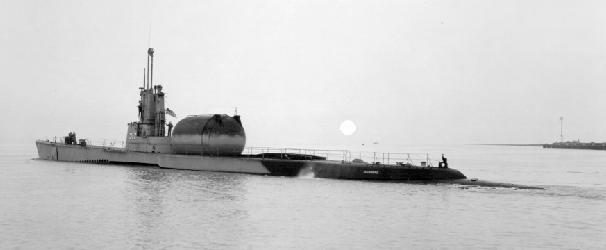
Barbero putting to sea

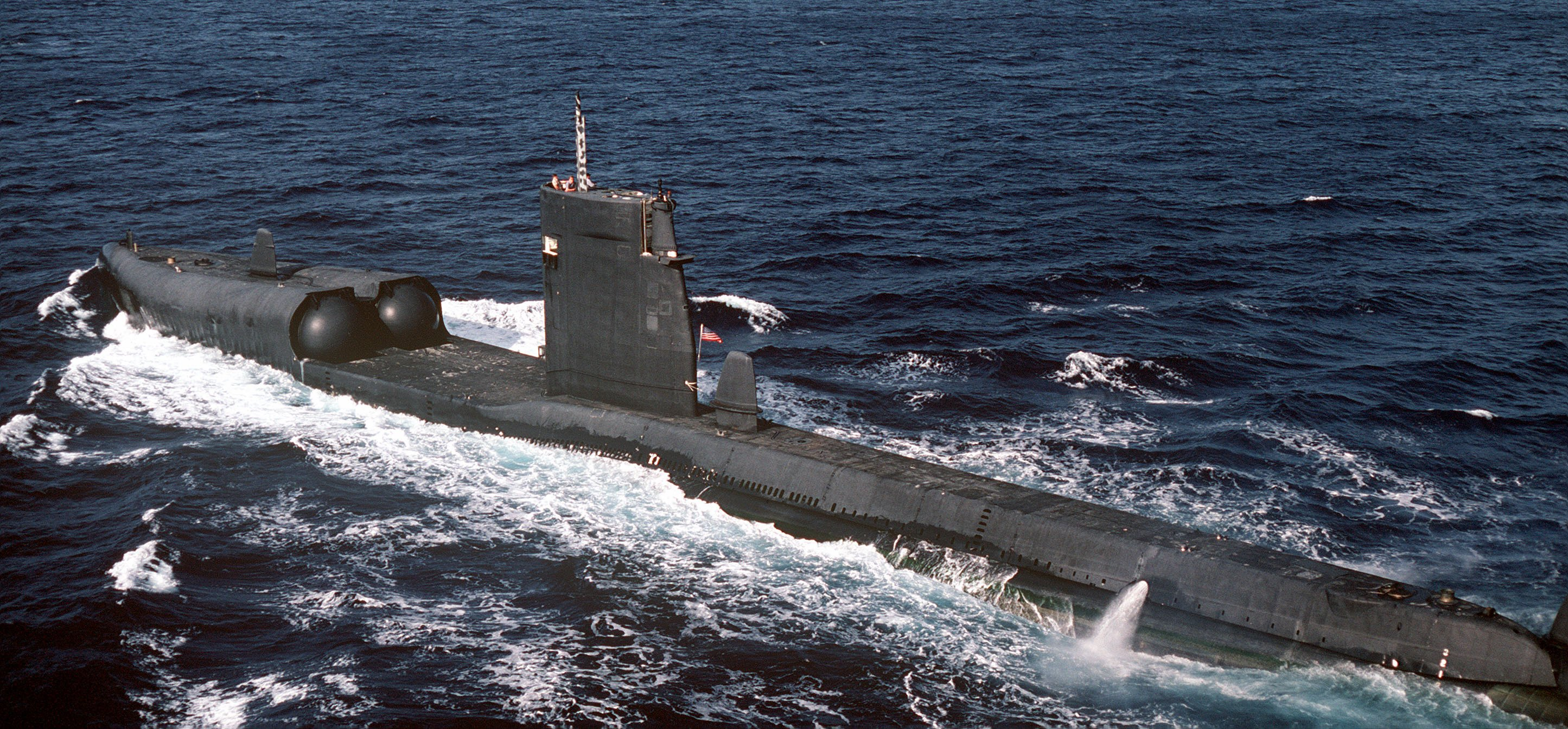
Grayback at sea in 1982

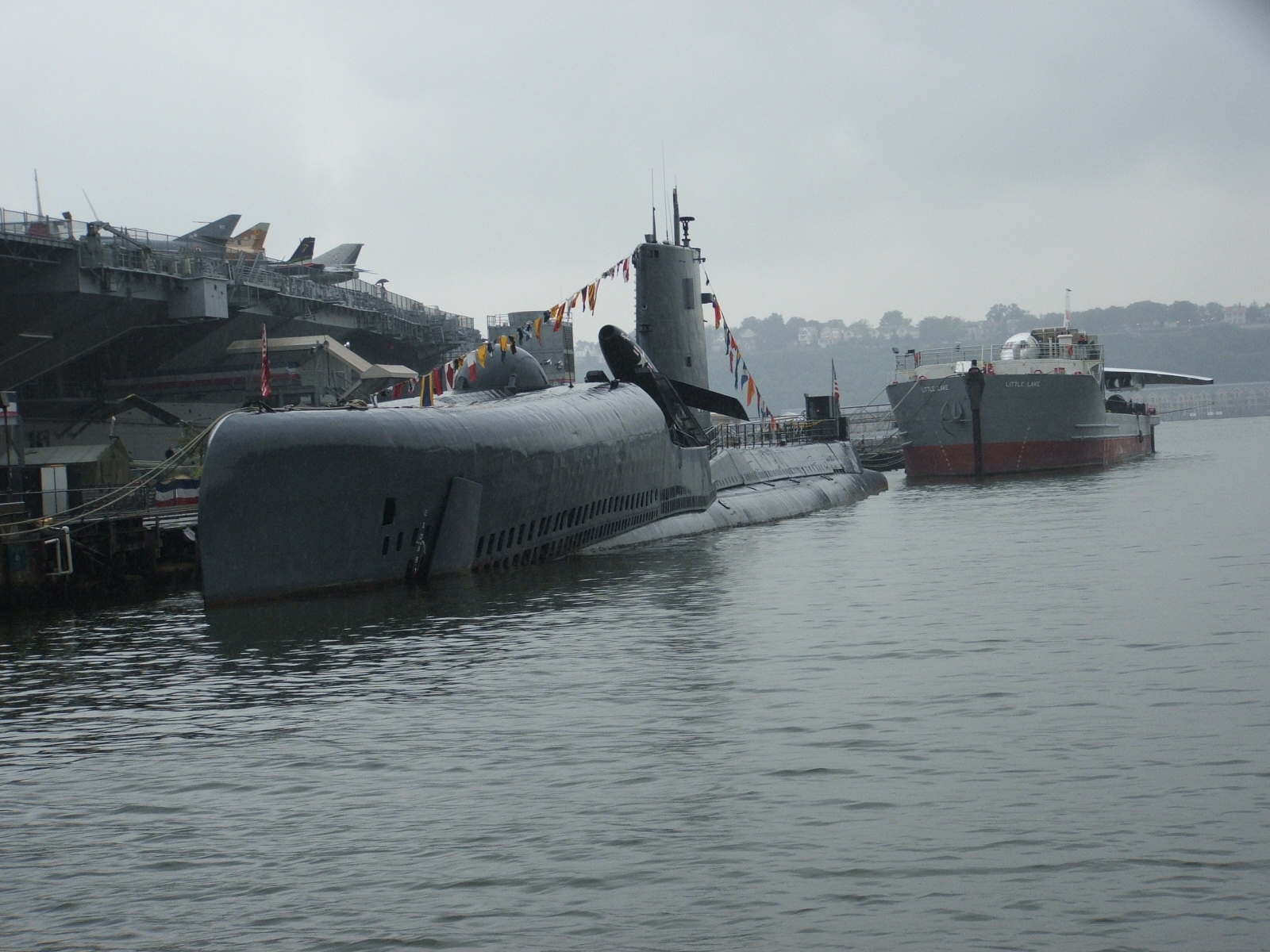
Growler on display in New York

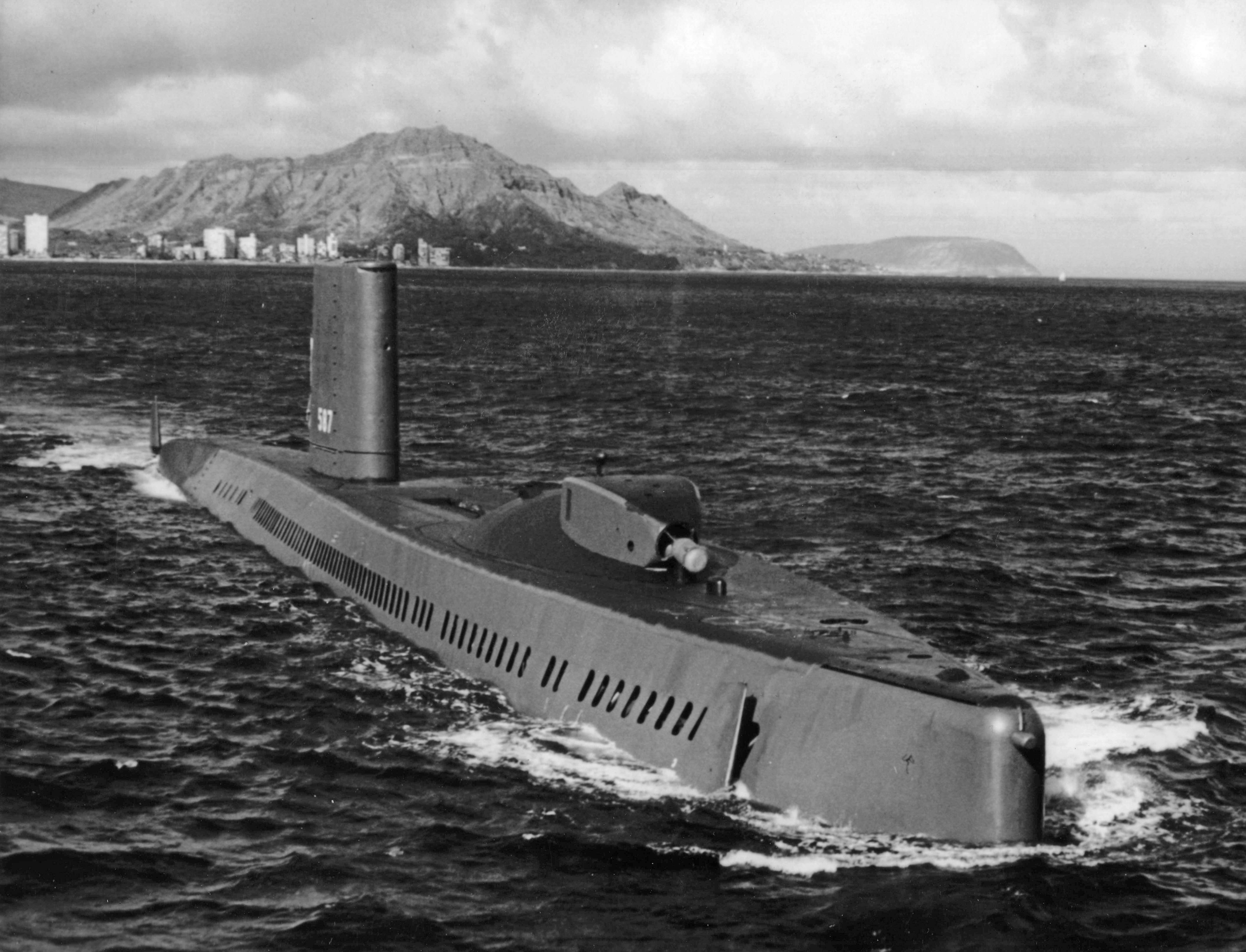
Halibut off the coast of O'ahu in 1965

Tunny was originally commissioned in September 1942 as a fleet submarine, and undertook a total of nine wartime patrols in the Pacific during the Second World War, for which she was awarded two Distinguished Unit Citations, before being decommissioned in December 1945. The boat was recommissioned into reserve in February 1952 as a stand-by for service during the Korean War, before decommissioning again in April. Tunny returned to service for a third time in March 1953 for conversion into a guided missile submarine, to be fitted with the missile hangar and launcher for Regulus. From 1953 to 1957, the boat was stationed at Port Hueneme as part of the Regulus test program, before transferring to Pearl Harbor to bring the missile into operational service. Following the withdrawal of Regulus, Tunny was converted into a troop-carrying submarine to conduct special operations off the coast of Vietnam. Tunny was decommissioned for the final time in June 1969, and was expended as a target in June 1970.

=== USS Barbero ===
Barbero was commissioned in April 1944 as a fleet submarine, and completed two wartime patrols as part of the Pacific Fleet before being placed in reserve in April 1946. The boat was converted to a cargo submarine and recommissioned in March 1948, after which she was used in a test program to evaluate the capabilities of submarines as cargo carriers. Following the end of this test phase, Barbero was decommissioned into reserve in June 1950. The boat's cargo conversion made her a suitable candidate when the Navy elected to commission a second Regulus missile submarine to complement Tunny in February 1955. Following recommissioning in October, Barbero was employed alongside Tunny in the Regulus test program, being deployed to the Atlantic Fleet in April 1956. She was returned to the Pacific as part of the Regulus force at Pearl Harbor in July 1959. In 1959, Barbero undertook the first instance of "missile mail", when it launched a Regulus containing two canisters of mail that had been processed in a specially established post office on board. Following the end of her service as part of the nuclear deterrent force, Barbero was decommissioned in June 1964, and sunk as a target off Hawaii in October 1964.

=== USS Grayback ===
Grayback was originally commissioned in March 1958, the first submarine built to accommodate Regulus. She was used for testing of Regulus II in September 1958 before the project was cancelled. In February 1959 she was deployed to Pearl Harbor to form part of Squadron 1 and undertake strategic deterrent patrols, which continued until 1964, following which Grayback was decommissioned. In November 1967, a new conversion was undertaken to transform the boat into an amphibious transport submarine. She was used as a transport for SEALs and divers on special operations during and after the Vietnam War, before finally being decommissioned in January 1984. Grayback was expended as a target in the South China Sea in April 1986.

=== USS Growler ===
Growler was commissioned in August 1958. Undertaking extensive sea trials throughout 1959, she arrived at Pearl Harbor in September before beginning her first strategic deterrent patrol. Following the end of the use of Regulus, Growler was decommissioned into reserve in May 1964. Although intended to undergo a similar conversion to Grayback to serve as an amphibious transport, this was subsequently cancelled. The boat was scheduled to be expended as a target, but in 1988 she was donated to the Intrepid Sea, Air & Space Museum in New York City. Today Growler is on display to the public alongside the aircraft carrier USS Intrepid.

=== USS Halibut ===
Halibut was commissioned in January 1960. Following a shakedown and exercises, she deployed to Pearl Harbor in November. After the end of her use as a Regulus submarine, in February 1965 Halibut underwent an overhaul and was redesignated as an attack submarine, operating from California. In 1968 she was taken in for refit and had a significant amount of specialised equipment installed to undertake espionage missions against the Soviet Union. These included Operation Ivy Bells, the mission to wire tap the underwater communications lines between Kamchatka and the Soviet mainland, and Operation Sand Dollar, which surveyed the wreck of the Soviet submarine K-129 prior to the attempt to raise it by the CIA. For its post-Regulus service, Halibut was twice awarded the Presidential Unit Citation. Halibut was decommissioned in June 1976 and struck from the Naval Vessel Register in April 1986, before finally being disposed of through the Ship-Submarine Recycling Program in 1994.

=== Gallery ===
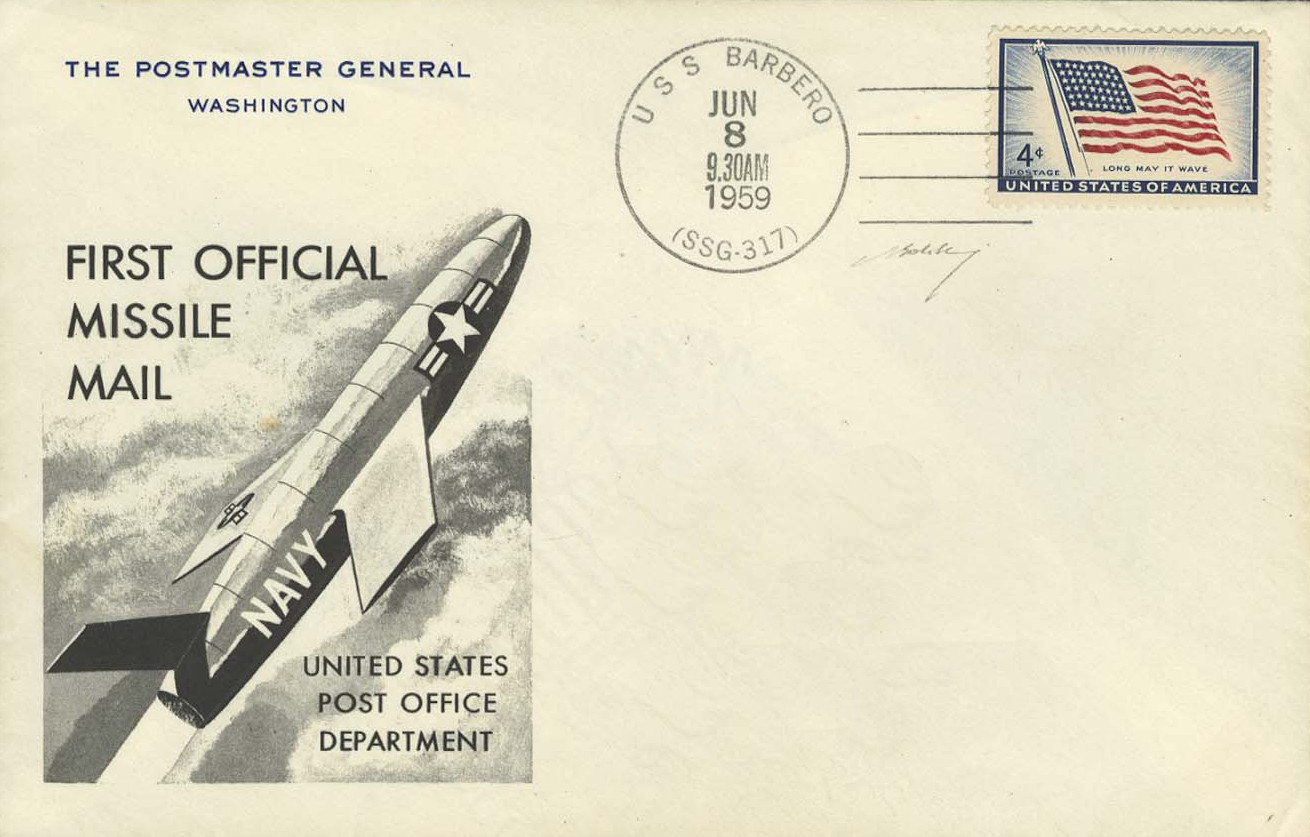
Commemorative cover delivered from Barbero by missile mail, 8 June 1959

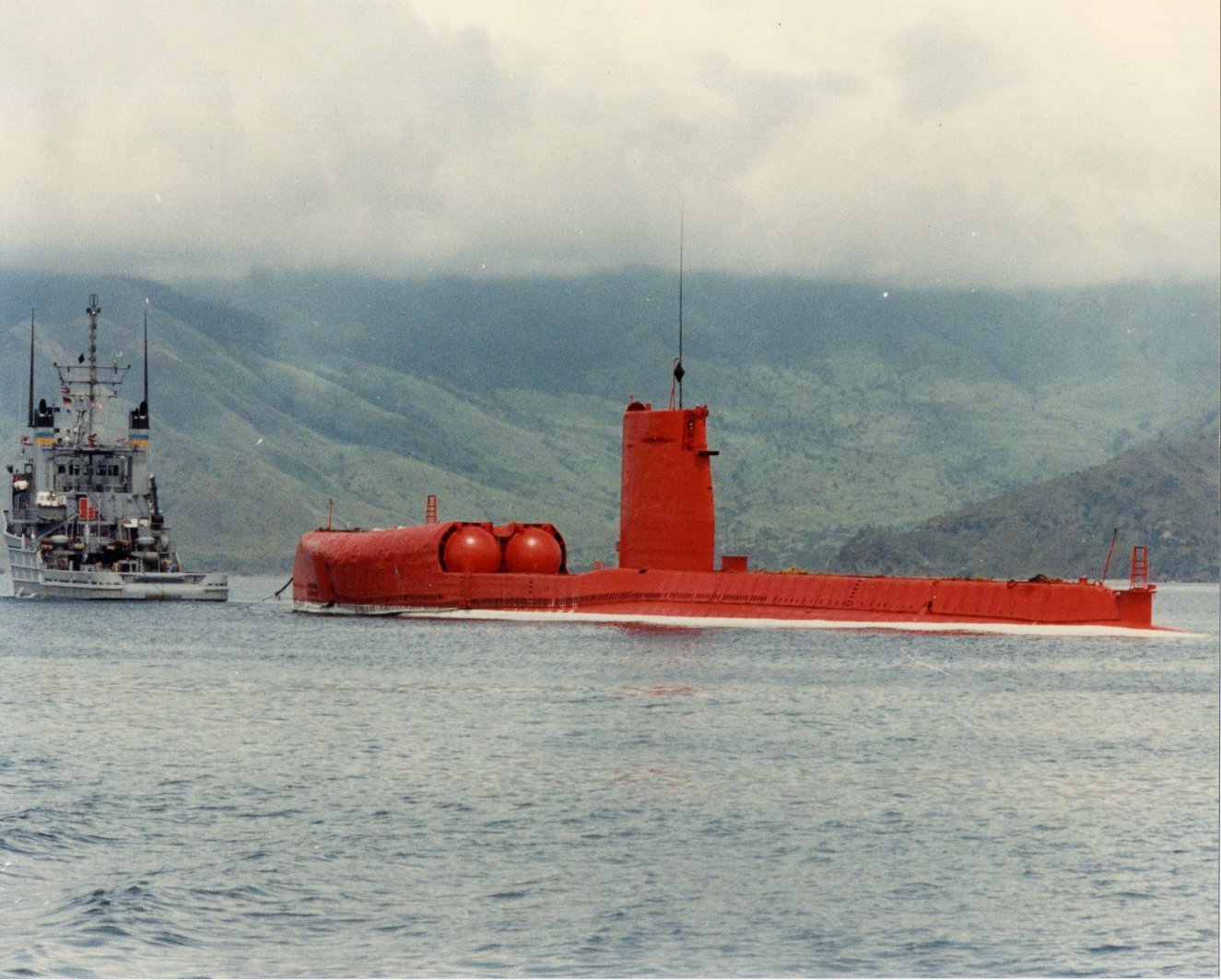
Grayback painted orange in preparation for her sinking

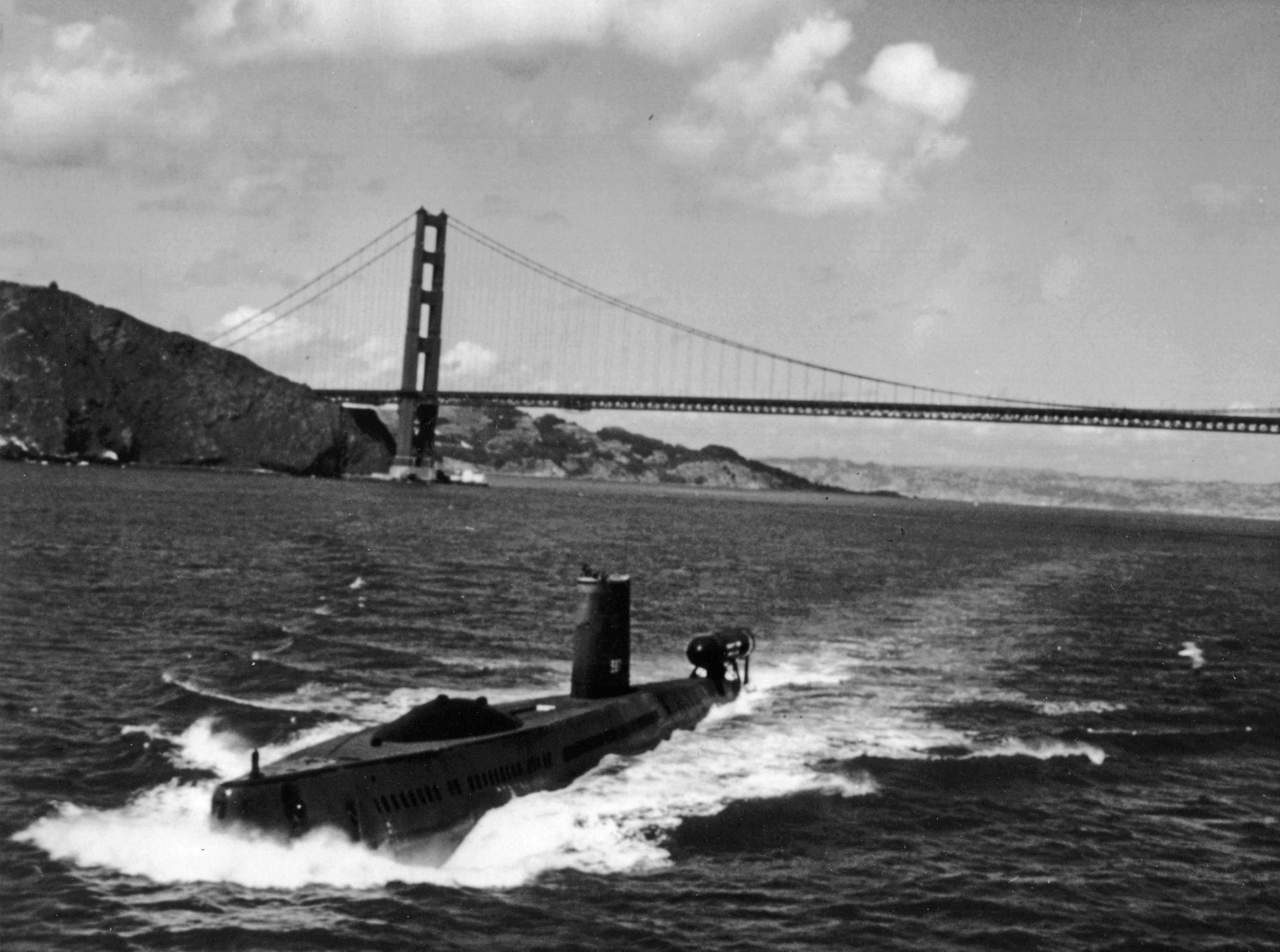
Halibut in San Francisco in the 1970s

== Subsequent cruise missile submarines ==
Unlike the Soviet Union, whose lack of significant naval aviation capability meant that it invested heavily in the use of cruise missile submarines, the United States did not operate cruise missiles for more than a decade following the withdrawal of Regulus. It was not until the entry into service of the Tomahawk that tactical land attack missiles returned to the US Navy's inventory. Initially, when it was brought into service aboard US submarines in 1983, it was used aboard the Navy's fleet submarines, launched horizontally from torpedo tubes. However, starting from USS Providence, the Los Angeles-class submarines were fitted with 12 vertical launch tubes (VLS) for Tomahawk missiles. This feature was subsequently included on the first ten Virginia-class submarines.

In 1994, the Nuclear Posture Review recommended the withdrawal of four Ohio-class SSBNs. The decision was subsequently taken to convert the four oldest boats, Ohio, Michigan, Florida and Georgia, into specialist cruise missile submarines, with an additional role as special operations boats. Each boat had 22 of its 24 ballistic missile tubes converted to accommodate up to seven Tomahawk missiles each, for a total of up to 154 missiles per submarine, approximately the same number as is carried by a surface battle group. The conversion program was integrated with refuelling, and took just over five years to complete all four boats, with work beginning on Ohio in November 2002, and Georgia being released from the shipyard in December 2007. All four boats had entered service in their new roles by 2008.

In 2014, USS North Dakota entered service, the first Virginia-class boat fitted with a pair of newly designed missile tubes intended to be able to carry not just Tomahawk, but potential future land-attack missiles. These missile tubes were similar in diameter to the tubes in the Ohio-class SSGNs. This feature, replacing the single use Tomahawk launchers of the Los Angeles and earlier Virginia-class boats, is planned for as many as eighteen boats after North Dakota's commissioning (up to and including Oklahoma). Following this, the intention from Arizona onwards is to have boats fitted not just with the two large bow-mounted tubes, but an additional module aft of the sail (the "Virginia Payload Module" or VPM) containing four further missile tubes, with the potential for a Virginia-class submarine to carry as many as 40 Tomahawk missiles. This is intended to in part replace the capability that would otherwise be lost once the four Ohio-class submarines are withdrawn in the mid to late 2020s. In recognition of the enhanced capabilities of the VPM, from Arizona onwards Virginia-class boats will be classified as SSGN rather than SSN.

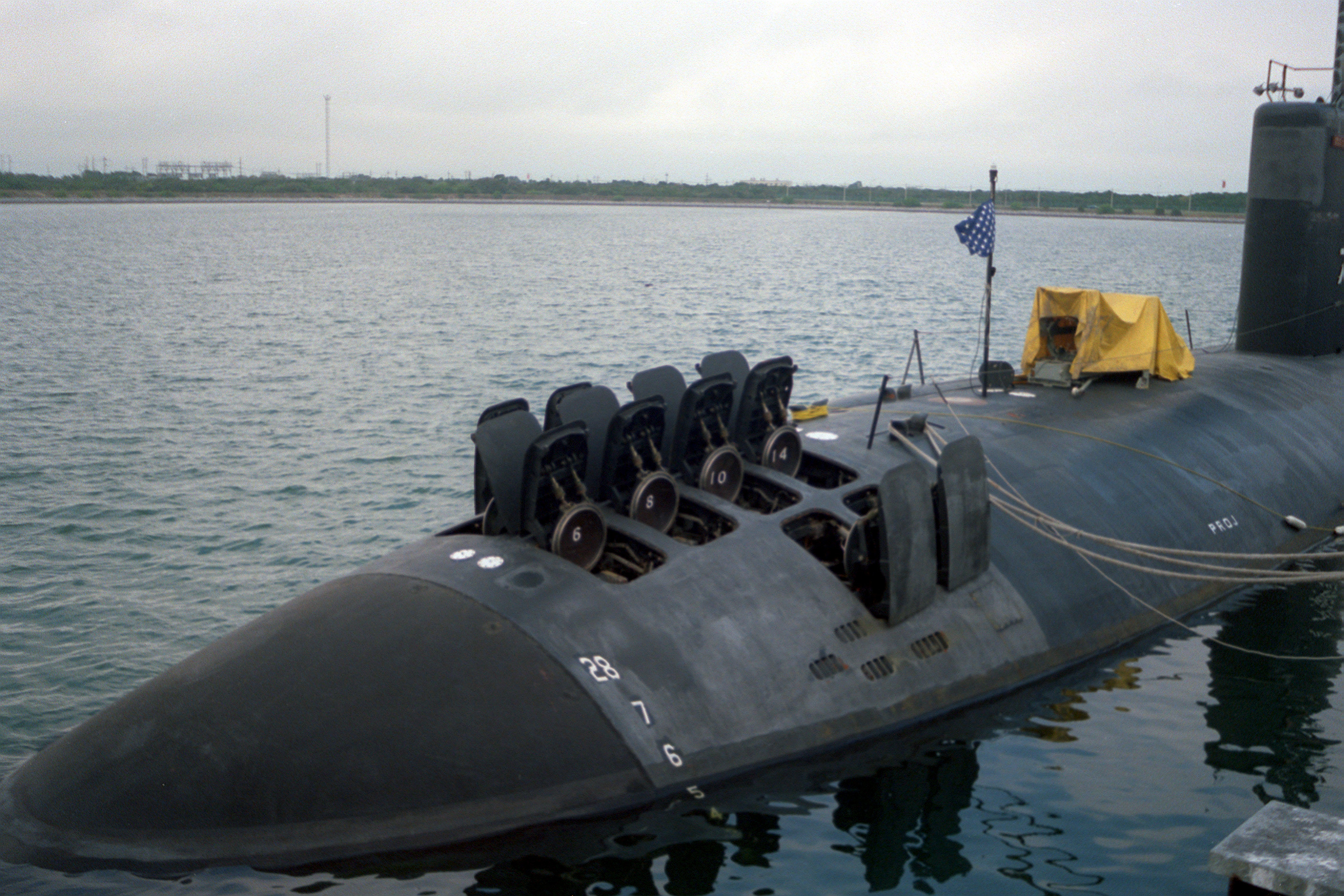
USS Santa Fe with her missile tubes open

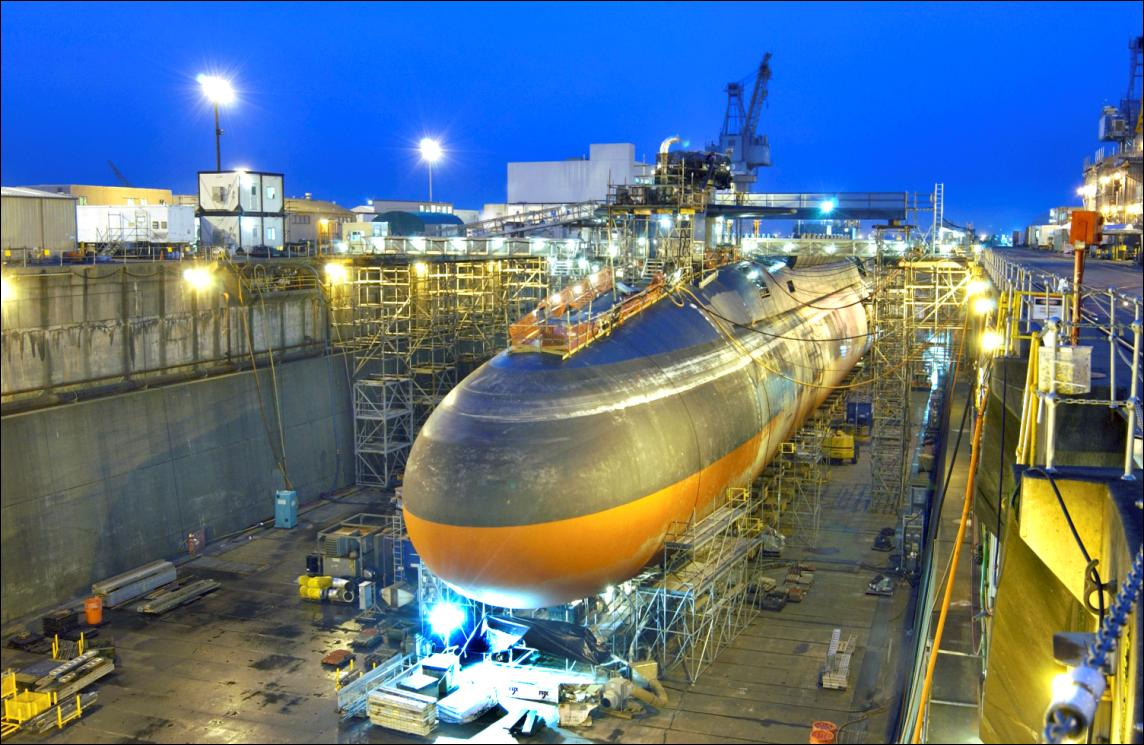
USS Ohio undergoing conversion to a cruise missile submarine in 2004

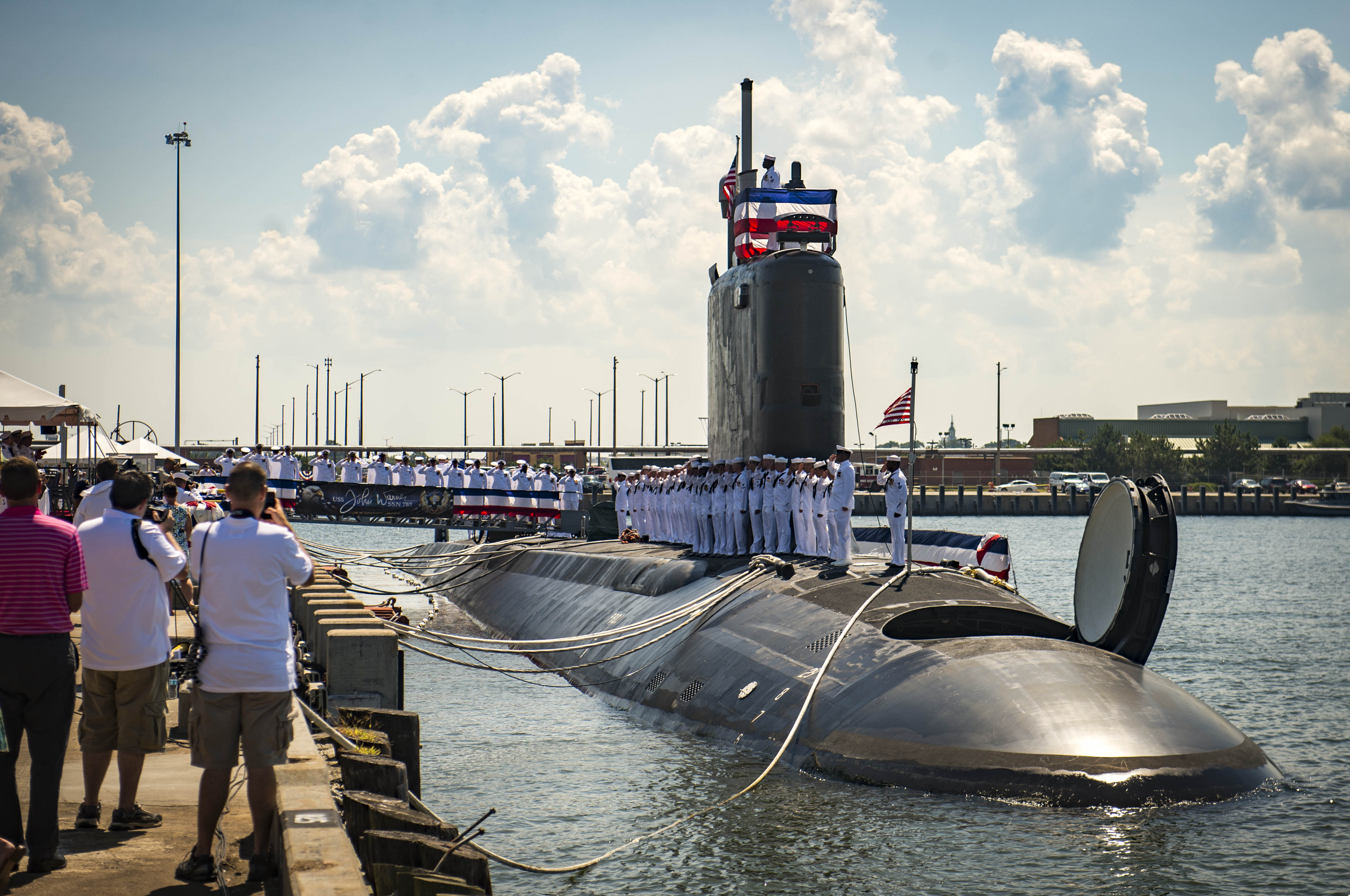
USS John Warner with her forward missile hatch open

== Recognition ==
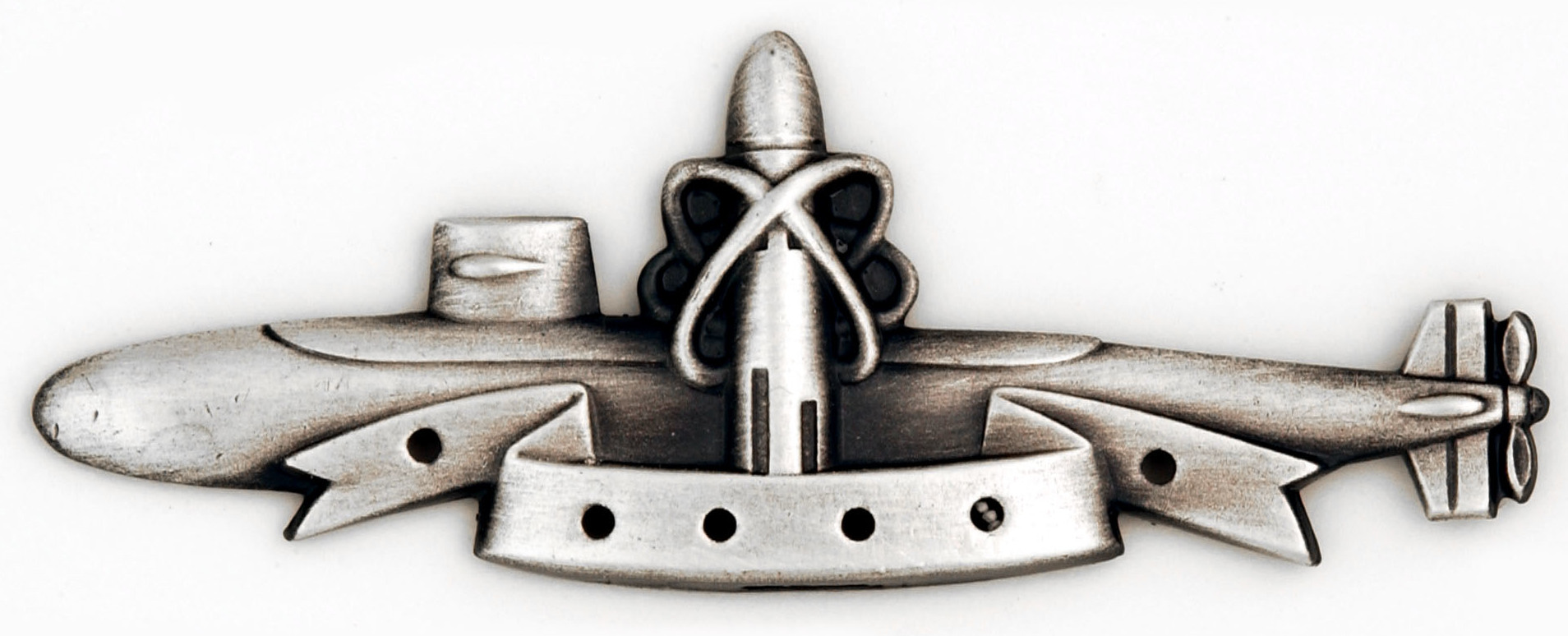
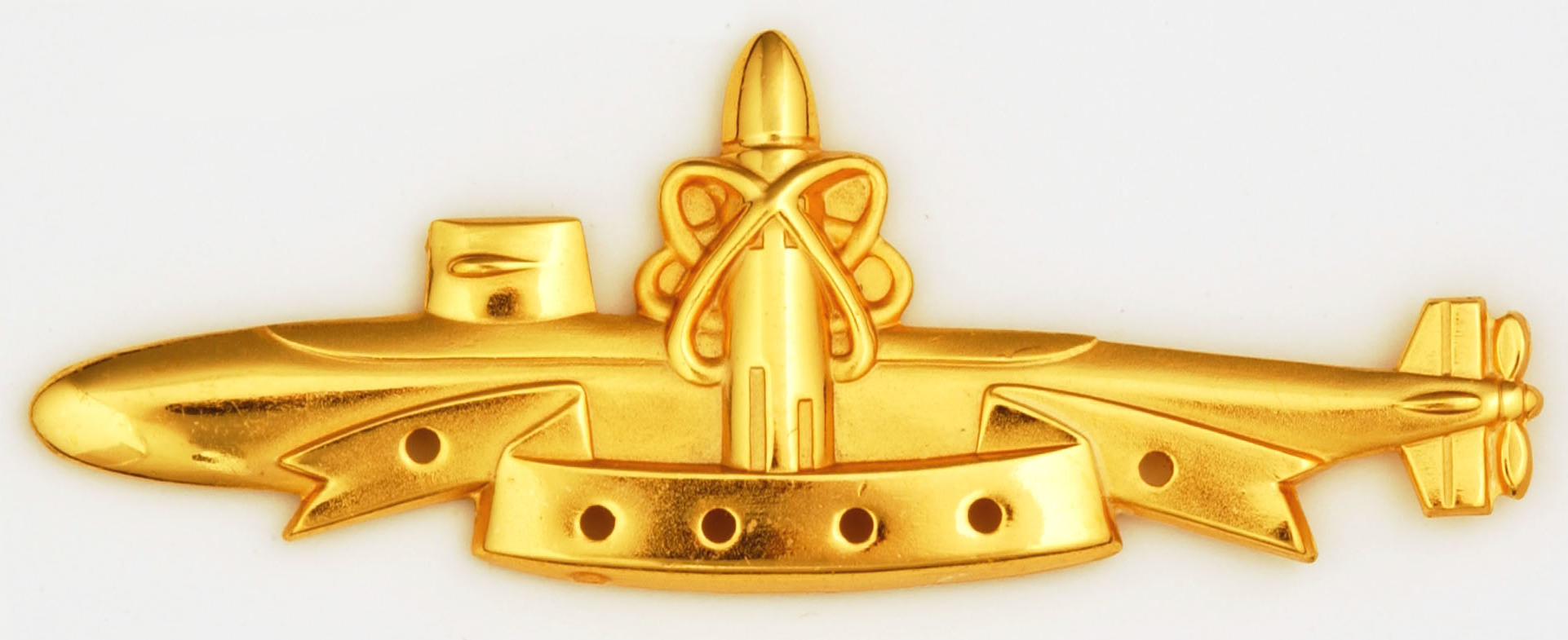
SSBN Deterrent Patrol Pin, in silver and gold

The US Navy awards an insignia to officers and crew to have completed strategic deterrent patrols. The design of the SSBN Deterrent Patrol insignia shows a silver Lafayette-class submarine with superimposed Polaris missile and electron rings which signify the armament and nuclear-powered characteristics of the Fleet Ballistic Missile Deterrent Force. A gold star is awarded for each successful patrol, with a silver star awarded after five patrols. After 20 patrols, the silver pin is upgraded to a gold design. The insignia was awarded retroactively to the first patrol of the George Washington that was completed in January 1961, but the deterrent missions of the five Regulus boats were not included. However, in 1997 a change in policy was made that declared the Regulus missions as being equivalent to SSBN patrols, with the insignia ordered to be awarded to all eligible personnel.

== See also ==
- 41 for Freedom
- Ohio-class submarine
