= USS Florida (SSGN-728) =

Submarine of the United States

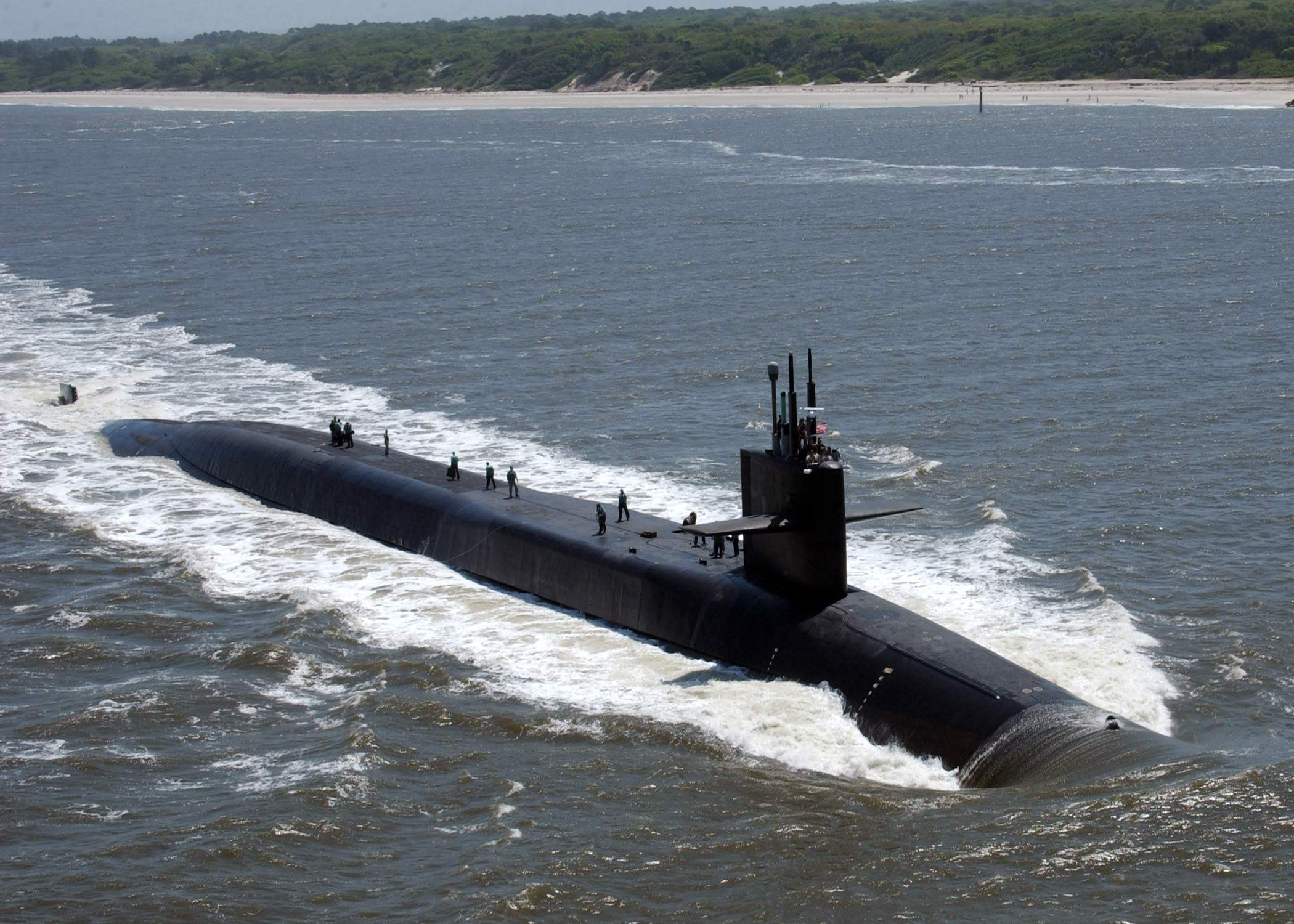
- USS Florida (SSGN-728)

History

United States
- Namesake: U.S. state of Florida
- Ordered: 28 February 1975
- Builder: General Dynamics Electric Boat
- Laid down: 4 July 1976
- Launched: 14 November 1981
- Commissioned: 18 June 1983
- Home port: Kings Bay, Georgia
- Motto: Latin: Fortes Fortuna Adiuvat; ("Fortune Favors the Brave")
- Status: in active service
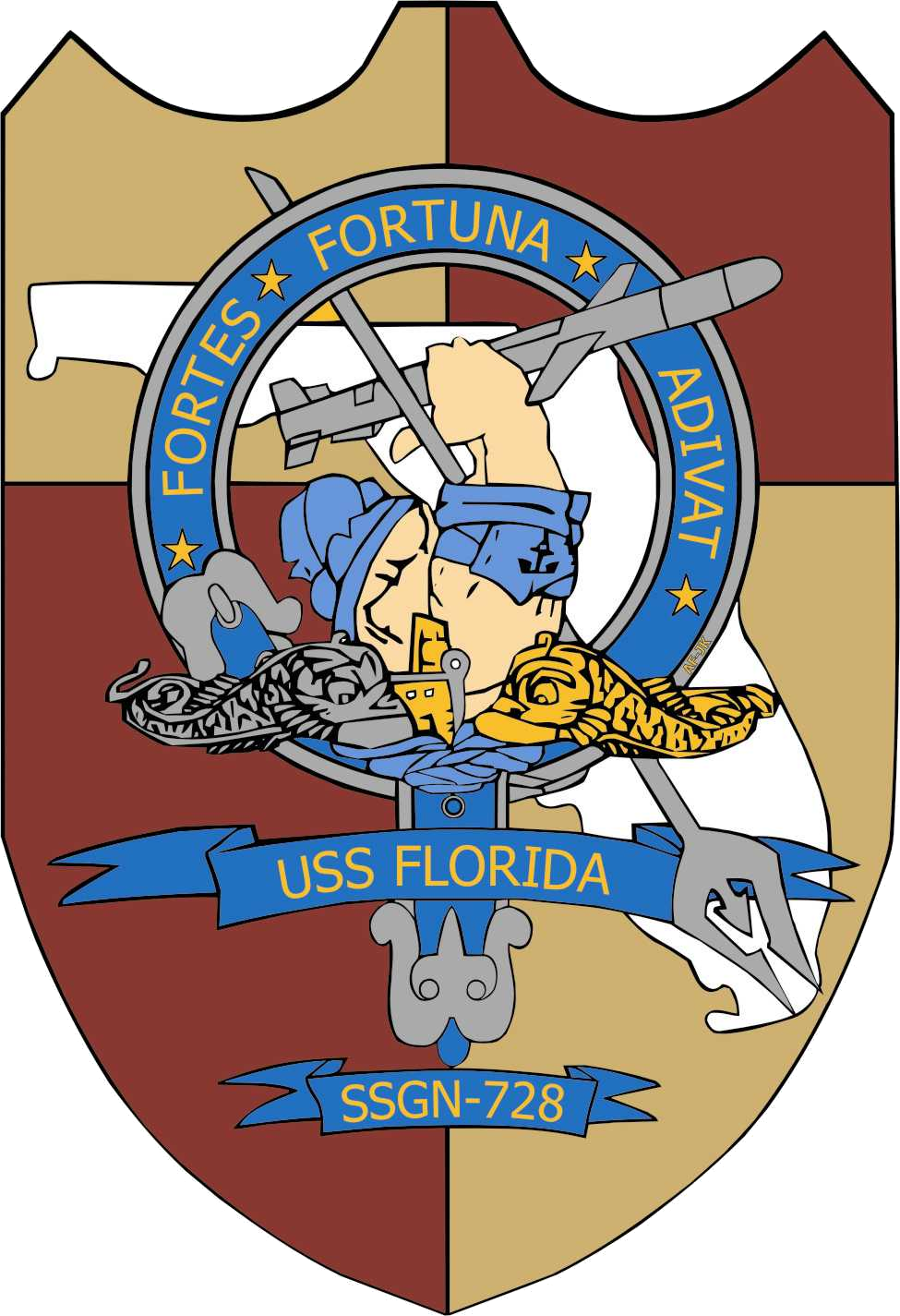
- Badge

General characteristics
- Class & type: Ohio-class submarine
- Displacement: 16,764 long tons (17,033 t) surfaced; 18,750 long tons (19,050 t) submerged
- Length: 560 ft (170 m)
- Beam: 42 ft (13 m)
- Draft: 38 ft (12 m)
- Propulsion: 1 × S8G PWR nuclear reactor (HEU 93.5%); 2 × geared turbines; 1 × 325 hp (242 kW) auxiliary motor; 1 × shaft @ 60,000 shp (45,000 kW)
- Speed: Greater than 25 knots (46 km/h; 29 mph)
- Test depth: Greater than 800 feet (240 m)
- Complement: 15 officers; 140 enlisted
- Armament: 4 × 21 in (533 mm) torpedo tubes; 154 × BGM-109 Tomahawks in 22 groups of seven

USS Florida (hull number SSBN-728/SSGN-728), an Ohio-class cruise missile submarine, is the sixth vessel of the United States Navy to be named for the U.S. state of Florida. She was commissioned with the hull designation of SSBN-728; with her conversion to a cruise missile submarine, from a ballistic missile submarine, she was re-designated SSGN-728.

== Construction and commissioning ==
The contract to build her was awarded to the Electric Boat Division of General Dynamics Corporation in Groton, Connecticut, on 28 February 1975 and her keel was laid down on the bicentennial of the United States independence, 4 July 1976. The boat was unnamed at the keel-laying ceremony.

The initial boat's crew formed the precommissioning unit on 8 July 1980. The first duty watches were stationed on 14 February 1981 to support the operational control transfer of engineering systems to boat's force control. The Secretary of the Navy finally named her on 19 January 1981.

Florida was launched on 14 November 1981 sponsored by Mrs. Marcia M. Carlucci, wife of then Deputy Secretary of Defense Frank Carlucci. The reactor was initially taken critical on 13 November 1982; the boat went into service and the crew moved onboard on 21 January 1983. Florida commenced initial builders' sea trials on 21 February 1983 and was subsequently delivered to the Navy on 17 May 1983, 43 days ahead of schedule. She was commissioned on 18 June 1983, with Captain William L. Powell in command of the Blue Crew and Captain George R. Sterner in command of the Gold Crew.

== Operational history ==
Both crews successfully completed the demonstration and shakedown operations, each culminated by the successful launch of a Trident C-4 missile. Florida transited the Panama Canal in February and arrived in Bangor, Washington on 25 March 1984. She completed her first strategic deterrent patrol on 25 July 1984.

As of November 2002, Florida had successfully completed 61 strategic deterrent patrols. She won the Battle E in 1989, 1991, 1994, 1999, and 2002. In 1991, she won the Marjorie Sterrett Battleship Fund Award. In 1997, Florida's skipper, Commander Michael J. Alfonso, was relieved of command "because he had been unable to foster an effective command team so necessary to the success of the U.S. submarine force."

Florida's command history for 1997 states:

...Concerned about Commander Alfonso's leadership style and the low morale displayed by his crew, Rear Admiral Sullivan (Commander, Submarine Group Nine) took the extraordinary step of relieving the Blue crew captain of his command. On 12 August, Commander Gregory M. Billy, USN, assumed command of Florida (Blue) in a brief ceremony.

=== Conversion to SSGN ===
Florida entered Norfolk Naval Shipyard in July 2003 to undergo a refueling and conversion from an SSBN to an SSGN. Florida completed her conversion in April 2006 and is homeported in Naval Submarine Base Kings Bay, Georgia. On 25 May 2006 she had a return to service ceremony at Naval Station Mayport, Florida. Ms. Carlucci was the boat's sponsor for her recommissioning in Mayport in May 2006.

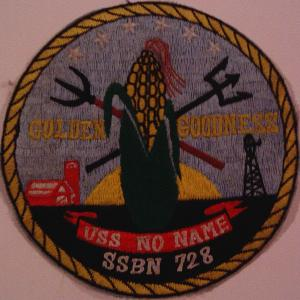
The patch designed by the pre-commissioning crew, prior to the naming. Rumors said the boat was to be named Iowa.

=== Operation Odyssey Dawn ===
On 19 March 2011, in conjunction with other U.S. Navy and Royal Navy warships and submarines, Florida fired scores of Tomahawk missiles at Libyan air defense targets as part of Operation Odyssey Dawn. The Tomahawk missile strikes allowed British, French, and allied warplanes to begin enforcing a no-fly zone over Libya, preventing Muammar Gaddafi from using his air force to attack rebels in his country. This was the first combat action for the Florida or any other Ohio-class submarine. During Operation Odyssey Dawn, Florida launched 93 Tomahawk missiles, with 90 effective, out of her total magazine of about 160 missiles.

Of the four Ohio-class SSGNs in the U.S. Navy, Florida was the only one that was available for use in Operation Odyssey Dawn since she was the only one that had been assigned to cruise the Mediterranean Sea. Some other Tomahawk missiles were fired by American surface ships and by a few Royal Navy nuclear submarines.

On 28 June 2010, Florida was one of three Ohio-class submarines involved in a US response to Chinese missile testing in the contested East China Sea. Florida, Ohio, and Michigan all surfaced simultaneously in the waters of the British Indian Ocean Territory, the Philippines, and the Republic of Korea respectively.

=== 2023 ===
Florida was sent to the Persian Gulf in autumn 2023, during the Gaza war. Earlier that year in April, the Navy reported that Florida was one of two Ohio-class SSGNs, cruising through the Suez Canal into the Red Sea, while operating in the Middle East.

== Awards ==
On 15 February 2013, Florida's crew was awarded the Navy Unit Commendation having "distinguished itself in action against the enemy" during Operation Odyssey Dawn in 2011.
