= Refueling and overhaul =

Extensive maintenance period for nuclear powered US Navy vessels

In the United States Navy, refueling and overhaul (ROH) refers to a lengthy refitting process or procedure performed on nuclear-powered naval ships, which involves replacement of expended nuclear fuel with new fuel and a general maintenance fix-up, renovation, and often modernization of the entire ship. In theory, such process could simply involve only refueling or only an overhaul, but in practice, nuclear refueling is always combined with an overhaul. An ROH usually takes one to two years for submarines and up to three years for an aircraft carrier, performed at a naval shipyard. Time periods between ROHs on a ship have varied historically from about 5–20 years (for submarines) to up to 25 years (for Nimitz-class aircraft carriers). For modern submarines and aircraft carriers, ROHs are typically carried out about midway through their operating lifespan. There are also shorter maintenance fix-ups called availabilities for ships periodically at shipyards. A particularly lengthy refueling, maintenance, and modernization process for a nuclear aircraft carrier can last up to almost three years and be referred to as a refueling and complex overhaul (RCOH).

== Process ==
At a shipyard, a ship to undergo ROH goes into a drydock, which is then closed off from the sea. Water is evacuated from the drydock with keel blocks pre positioned under the hull, so the ship's keel area will rest on the blocks as the water is pumped out. At the end of the ROH, the drydock is refilled with water so the ship can be re-floated and removed from the dock.

Then SSBN (now SSGN) USS Michigan in drydock filled with seawater (2002)	USS Greeneville (SSN-772) in drydock drained of seawater at a shipyard (2001). (Note blocks, in dark shadow, under the hull.)

To start ROH, operating procedures are used to shut down and cool down the propulsion power plant to bring it to desired temperatures, pressures, and other conditions. During the ROH, ship's Navy crew stand shutdown watches, and civilian shipyard workers do much of the repair, maintenance, and installation work.

Land-based naval reactor prototype plants have also undergone similar refueling and overhauls, not at a shipyard but at whatever facility they are located.

=== Refueling ===
In a nuclear-powered ship, the nuclear fuel is essentially a solid inside a reactor core which is inside the ship's nuclear reactor. Once a reactor core has gone critical, meaning it has been used during a reactor operation, highly radioactive nuclear fission products have formed in the core, and the core has become highly radioactive. Refueling involves taking the expended core out of the reactor and putting in a new core with fresh nuclear fuel. Because it is so radioactive, removing a core with spent nuclear fuel from a reactor requires elaborate radiological handling precautions. All materials that came in contact with the critical core, including the internal surfaces and coolant water, are considered radioactively contaminated and require special radiological handling and disposal precautions. In addition to radiological training and qualification required for working in radiation areas or with radioactive materials or contamination, radiation exposure to workers is monitored to ensure exposure limits are not exceeded.

=== Overhaul ===
The overhaul commonly includes extensive maintenance and renovation work and checks of various systems and equipment aboard the ship. A major overhaul also typically includes upgrading various systems and equipment to modernize them; for example, old analog electrical equipment may be replaced by new digital electronic equipment. The work for such overhauls is typically planned out by engineers well in advance and new equipment is obtained for any replacements or installations.

An example of renovation work done during refueling and overhauls of submarines is the conversion of a fleet ballistic missile submarine (SSBN) to a guided missile submarine (SSGN). Such a conversion consists of taking the 24 ballistic missiles and their silos out of the missile section in the submarine, and replacing them with 154 Tomahawk cruise missiles and special operations force insertion platforms which can carry up to 66 special operations personnel. The first four Ohio-class submarines have undergone such conversions during their midlife refueling and overhauls. For more details, see Ohio-class submarine § SSBN/SSGN conversions.

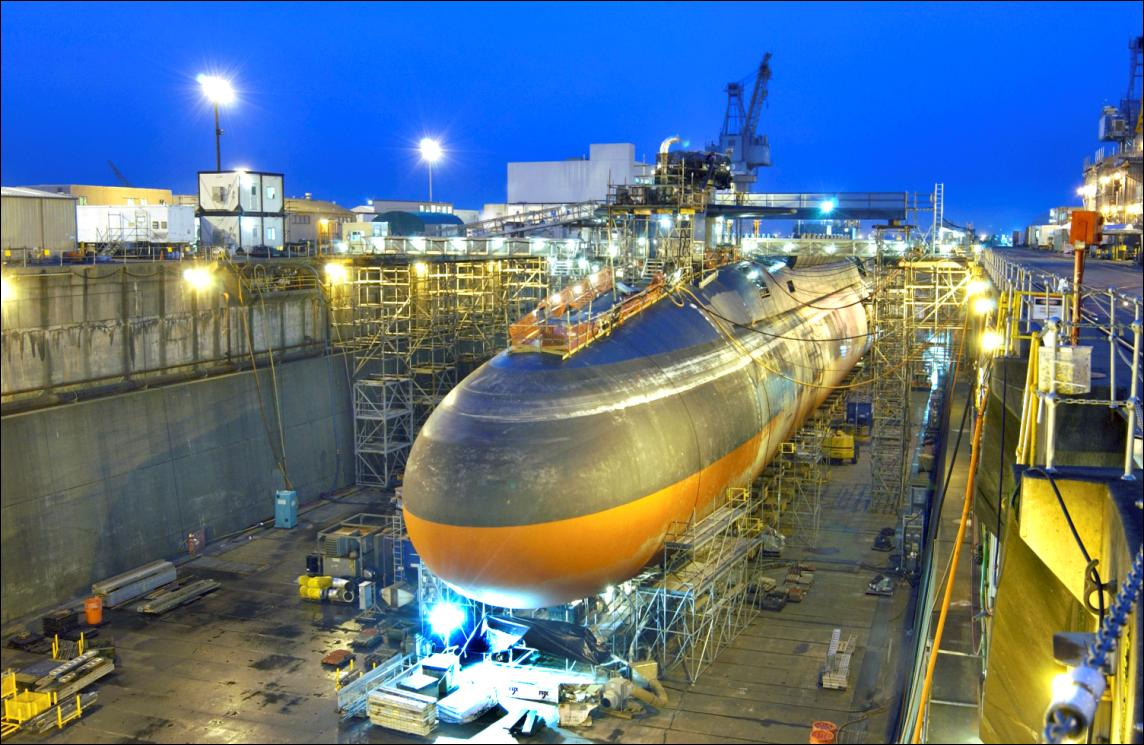
USS Ohio in drydock undergoing conversion to SSGN

During an overhaul, an extensive testing program is conducted. Numerous test procedures that have been written are followed, data is recorded as required, and logs of the testing are kept. Tests that can be conducted include: radiography to test critical welds, testing of fluid systems and other pressure boundaries which includes hydrostatic testing to detect any leaks, and testing of electrical and mechanical setpoints for various types of equipment such as sensor input setpoints for various kinds of automatic trips and safety valve relief pressure setpoints. At the finish of the ROH, the testing data records are bound and retained as a permanent documentation record resulting from the ROH.

As the ship is readied, toward the end of the ROH, the power plant is warmed or brought back up to the desired operating temperature and pressure so it can be started when ready.

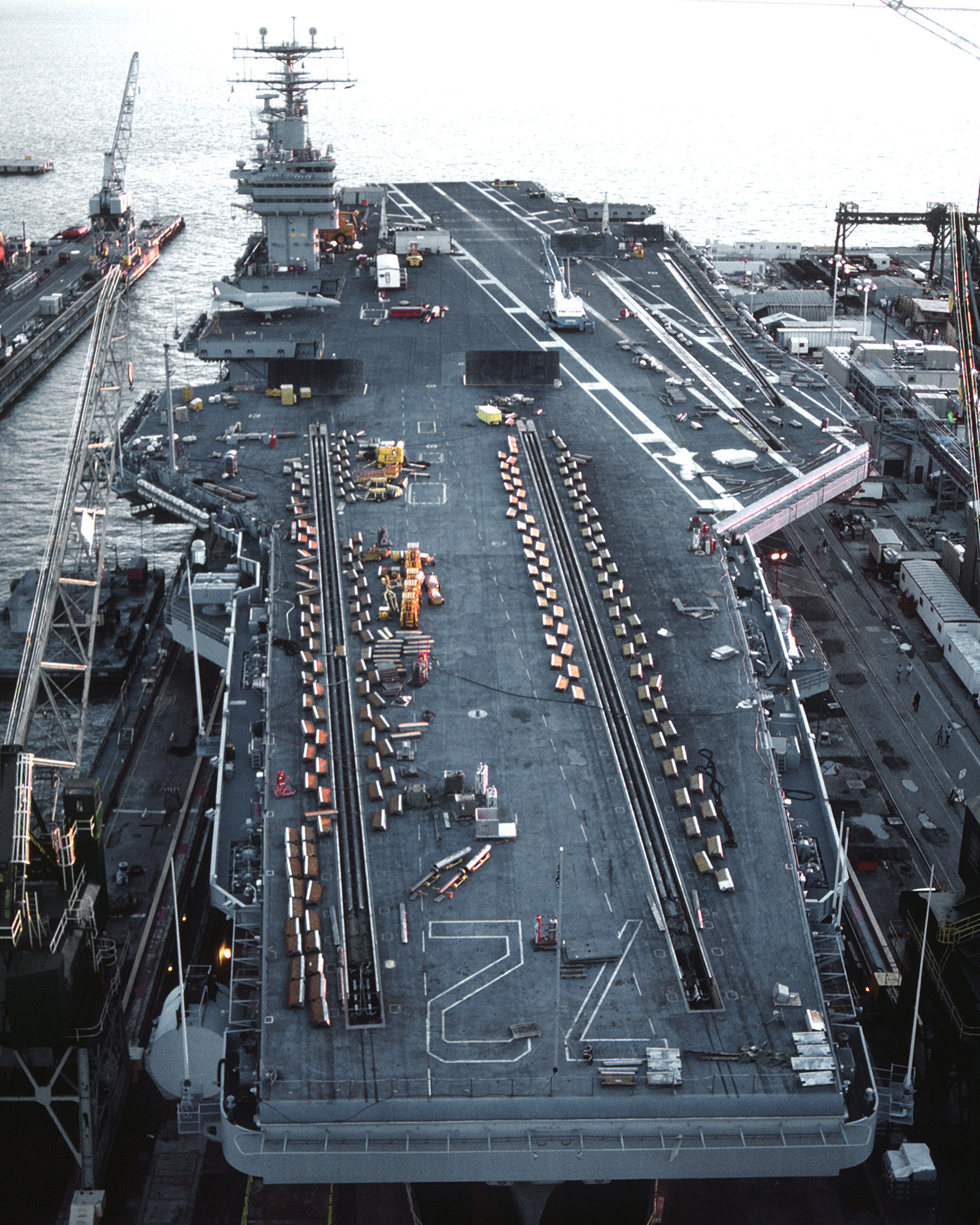
Aircraft carrier USS Abraham Lincoln in a Newport News Shipbuilding drydock in 1990

== Refueling and Complex Overhaul ==
Refueling and complex overhaul is a process for refueling and upgrading nuclear-powered aircraft carriers in the US Navy. The nuclear reactors that power some aircraft carriers typically use up their nuclear fuel about halfway through their desired 50-year life spans. Because carriers can last so long before being retired, they are refueled and refurbished with an RCOH to extend their usable lifetime. At the same time a ship is refueled, it is given a complex overhaul in which broken, worn or obsolete parts are repaired or replaced and systems are modernized. The modernization typically includes an upgrade of the ship’s combat systems and warfighting capabilities, its internal distribution systems are upgraded, and allowance is made for future upgrades over the ship’s remaining operational service life. Given the size of an aircraft carrier and the number of systems and subsystems it has, an RCOH is extremely complex, costly (several billion dollars), and time-consuming. Each RCOH is planned to take 46 months.

== Sources ==
- Schank, John F.; Mark V. Arena; Denis Rushworth; John Birkler; James Chiesa (2002). Refueling and Complex Overhaul of the USS Nimitz (CVN 68): Lessons for the Future. Santa Monica, California: Rand Corporation. ISBN 0-8330-3288-7.
