= USS Ohio (SSGN-726) =

Submarine of the United States

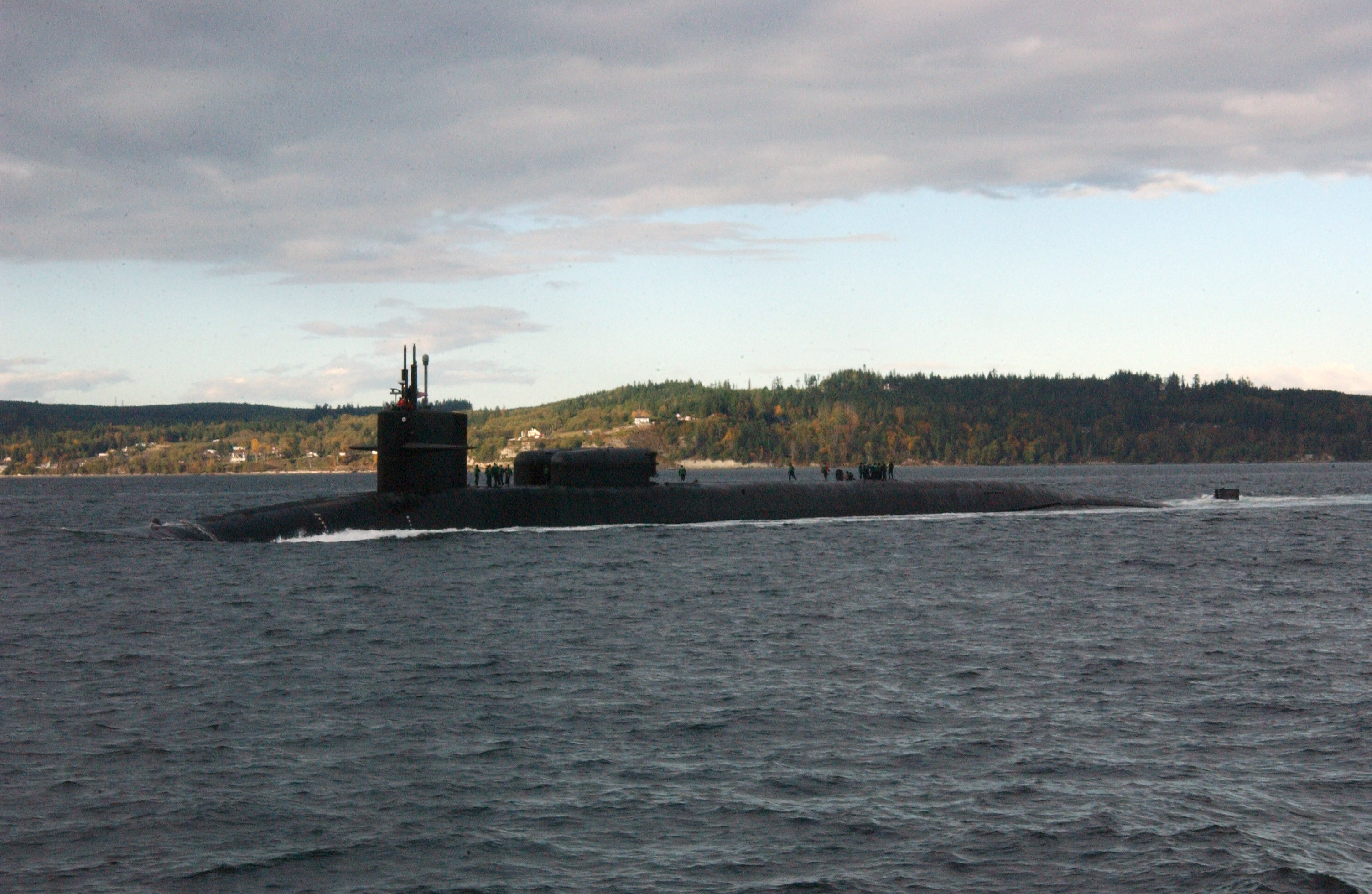
- USS Ohio (SSGN-726)

History

United States
- Namesake: State of Ohio
- Ordered: 1 July 1974
- Builder: General Dynamics Electric Boat
- Laid down: 10 April 1976
- Launched: 7 April 1979
- Commissioned: 11 November 1981
- Home port: Bangor, Washington
- Motto: Always first
- Nickname(s): First and Finest!
- Status: in active service
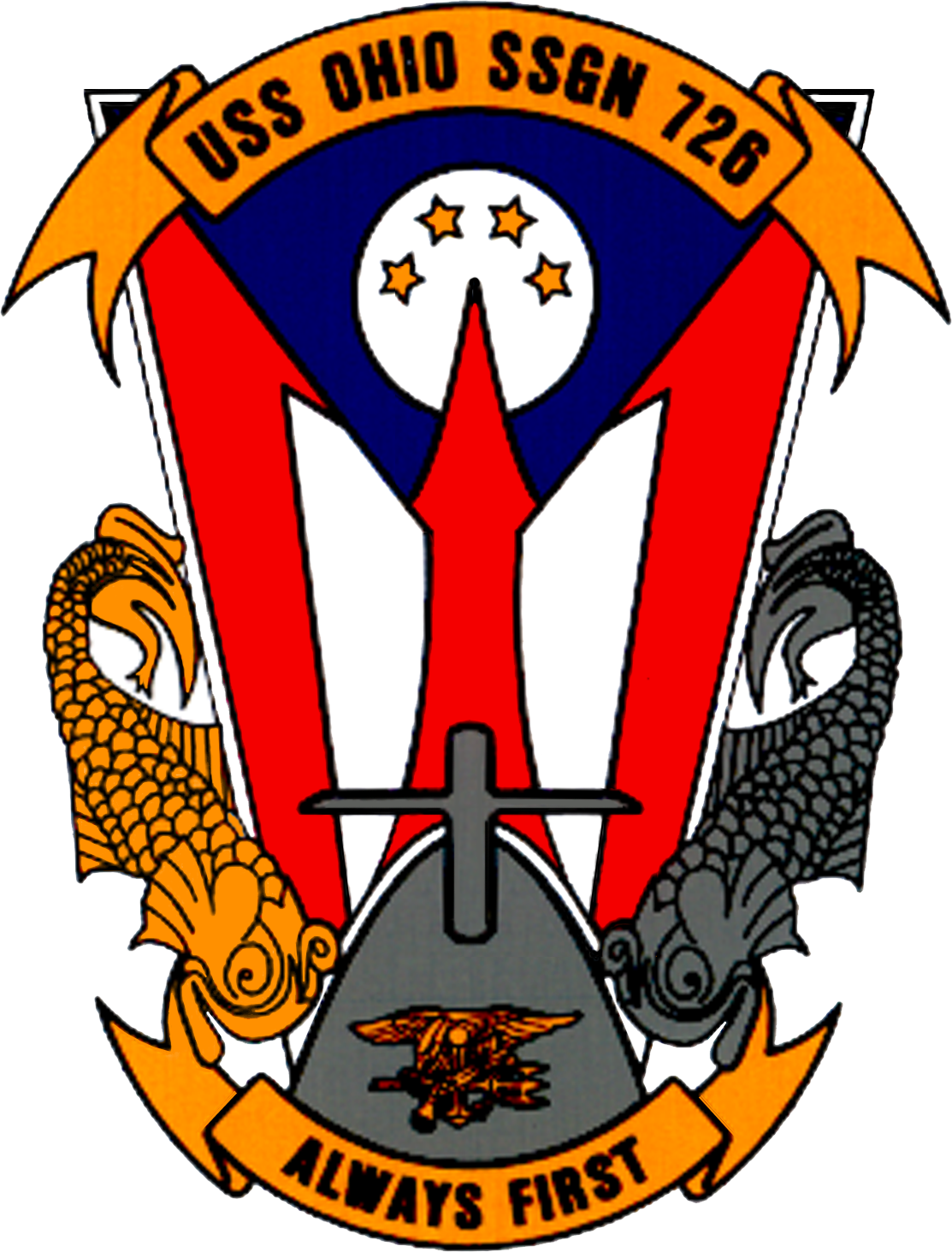
- Badge

General characteristics
- Class & type: Ohio class SSGN
- Displacement: 16,764 metric tons (16,499 long tons) surfaced; 18,750 metric tons (18,450 long tons) submerged
- Length: 560 ft (170 m)
- Beam: 42 ft (13 m)
- Propulsion: 1 × S8G PWR nuclear reactor (HEU 93.5%); 2 × geared turbines; 1 × 325 hp (242 kW) auxiliary motor; 1 × shaft @ 60,000 shp (45,000 kW)
- Speed: 12 knots (14 mph; 22 km/h) surfaced; +20 knots (23 mph; 37 km/h) submerged (official); 25 knots (29 mph; 46 km/h) submerged (reported)
- Range: unlimited
- Endurance: approximately 60 days with food supplies
- Test depth: +800 ft (240 m)
- Crew: 15 officers; 140 enlisted
- Sensors & processing systems: BQQ-6 Bow mounted sonar; BQR-19 Navigation; BQS-13 Active sonar; TB-16 towed array
- Armament: 4 × 21 inch (533 mm) bow torpedo tubes.; as SSBN: 24 × Trident II C4 SLBM, each with up to 8 MIRVed W76 nuclear warheads; SSGN conversion: 22 tubes, each with 7 Tomahawk cruise missiles

USS Ohio (hull number SSBN-726/SSGN-726), the lead boat of her class of nuclear-powered fleet ballistic missile submarines (SSBN), is the fourth vessel of the United States Navy to be named for the U.S. state of Ohio. She was commissioned with the hull designation of SSBN-726, and with her conversion to a guided missile submarine she was re-designated SSGN-726.

== Service history ==
=== As SSBN ===
The contract to build her was awarded to the Electric Boat Division of General Dynamics Corporation in Groton, Connecticut on 1 July 1974 and her keel was laid down on 10 April 1976 by Katherine Longworth Whittaker Taft, wife of Senator Robert Taft Jr. of Ohio. On 2 February 1978, the Precommissioning Unit was formed with Commander A. K. Thompson as its commanding officer. Ohio was launched on 7 April 1979 sponsored by Mrs. Annie Glenn, wife of Senator John H. Glenn of Ohio.

In the summer of 1981, sea trials were held to test the equipment and systems, and the submarine was delivered to the U.S. Navy on 28 October 1981. On 11 November 1981, Ohio was commissioned. The principal speaker, Vice President George H. W. Bush, remarked to the 8000 assembled guests that the boat introduced a "new dimension in our nation's strategic deterrence," and Admiral Hyman G. Rickover noted that Ohio should "strike fear in the hearts of our enemies." On that day, command of the two crews (designated Blue and Gold) of Ohio was assumed by Captain A. K. Thompson (Blue) and Captain A. F. Campbell (Gold).

Following Post Shakedown Availability at Electric Boat Division, Ohio left the Atlantic and transited to her new home port, Bangor, Washington, by way of Cape Canaveral – where she tested her missile launch systems – and the Panama Canal, arriving on 12 August 1982. During August and September 1982, the first loadout of Trident C-4 missiles and a predeployment refit were conducted. Ohio and her Blue Crew departed on the first Trident Submarine Strategic Deterrent Patrol in October 1982.

From June 1993 to June 1994 Ohio underwent overhaul at Puget Sound Naval Shipyard, Bremerton, Washington, receiving extensive upgrades to sonar, fire control, and navigation systems. Ohio resumed strategic deterrent patrols in January 1995 as part of Submarine Squadron Seventeen, Submarine Group Nine, Pacific Submarine Force.

=== Conversion to SSGN ===
Original plans called for Ohio to be retired in 2002. Instead, Ohio and three sister boats were modified and remain in service as cruise missile submarines (SSGNs). In November 2002 Ohio entered drydock, beginning a 36-month refueling and conversion overhaul. Electric Boat announced on 9 January 2006 that the conversion had been completed.

=== As SSGN ===
Following her conversion to a SSGN, Ohio rejoined the fleet on 7 February 2006. On 21 January 2007, the Gold Crew departed Naval Base Kitsap for Hawaii to conduct a forward-deployed crew exchange, the first such forward-deployed swap in approximately 20 years. Ballistic submarines of Ohio's class employ two crews, Blue and Gold, in order to facilitate continuous operation at sea, called "forward-presence" in USN parlance. Ohio left for her first mission as an SSGN on 15 October 2007. The Blue crew underwent several tests and inspections before completing a mission some time in December. Ohio was also the first one of the class to complete a mission.

On 28 June 2010, Ohio was one of three Ohio-class submarines involved in a US response to Chinese missile testing in the contested East China Sea. Ohio, Michigan, and Florida all surfaced simultaneously in the waters of the Philippines, South Korea, and the British Indian Ocean Territory respectively.

In November 2011, Lt. Britta Christianson became the first U.S. female officer, and first female overall, to complete submarine warfare qualification, while she was assigned to Ohio's Gold Crew. CSC Dominique Saavedra became the first enlisted female to earn her submarine qualification aboard Ohio in August 2016. She would go on to deploy with Michigan, the first sub specially modified with separate accommodations for enlisted female crew.

In December 2020, it was announced that Ohio would be decommissioned and enter the Ship-Submarine Recycling Program by 2026.

== Awards ==
- Former Navy Secretary Robert B. Pirie, Jr. announced the 2001 winners of the Navy Captain Edward F. Ney Memorial Awards and the Marine Corps Major General W. P. T. Hill Memorial Awards for outstanding food service in the Navy and Marine Corps. The formal presentation of the awards was made during the International Food Service Executives Association (IFSEA) conference on Saturday, 3 March 2001, in Anaheim, California. The afloat galley first-place winner in the Pacific fleet was Ohio (Blue). This award was before her conversion from SSBN to SSGN.
- In 2022, the commander of Submarine Force, U.S. Pacific Fleet (COMSUBPAC), Rear Adm. Jeff Jablon, announced the 2021 Battle "E" award to the Ohio.
