= USS Michigan (SSGN-727) =

Submarine of the United States

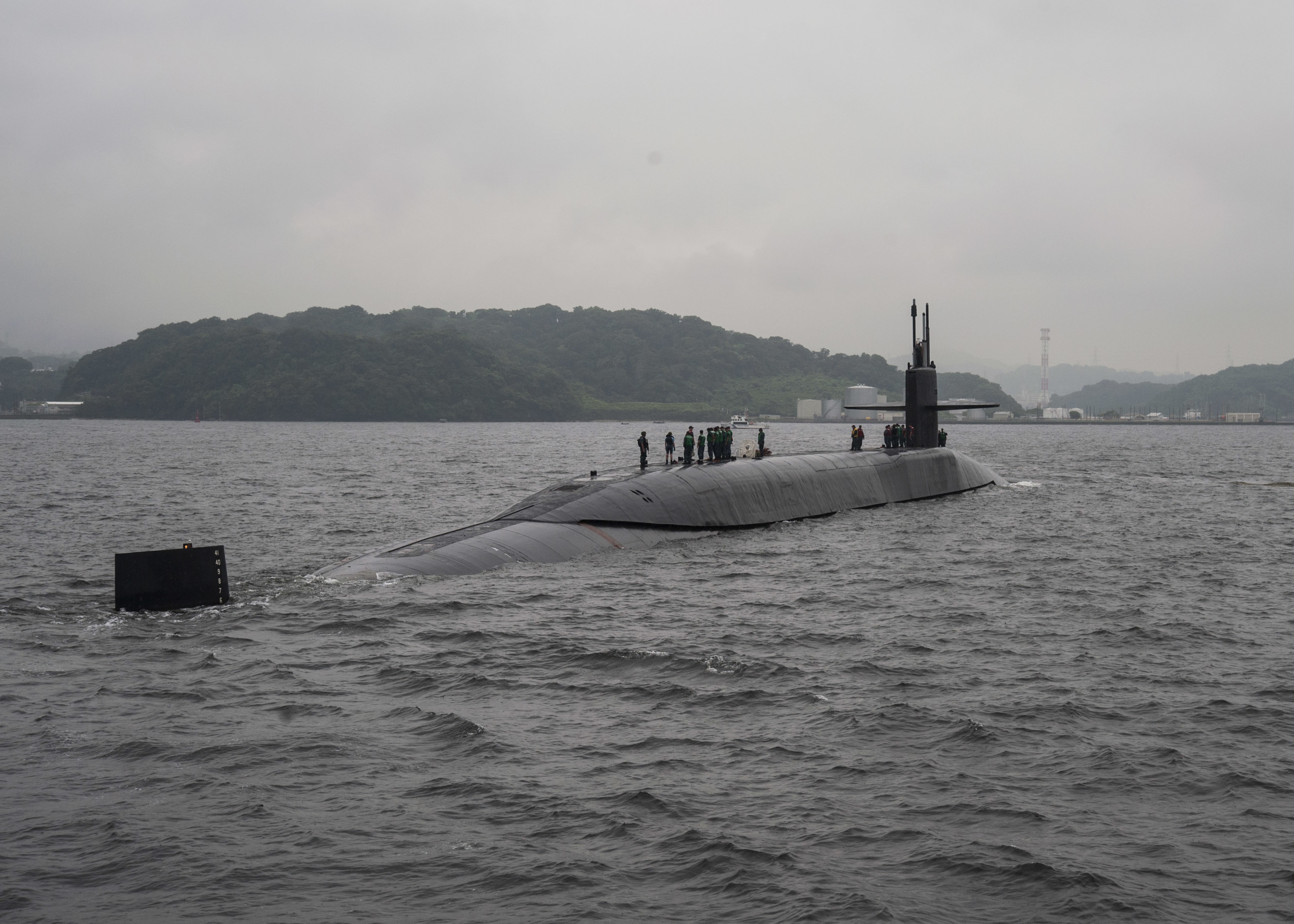
- USS Michigan (SSGN-727)

History

United States
- Name: USS Michigan (SSGN-727)
- Namesake: US state of Michigan
- Ordered: 28 February 1975
- Builder: General Dynamics Electric Boat
- Laid down: 4 April 1977
- Launched: 26 April 1980
- Commissioned: 11 September 1982
- Home port: Naval Base Kitsap, Bangor, Washington
- Motto: Tuebor ("I will defend")
- Status: in active service
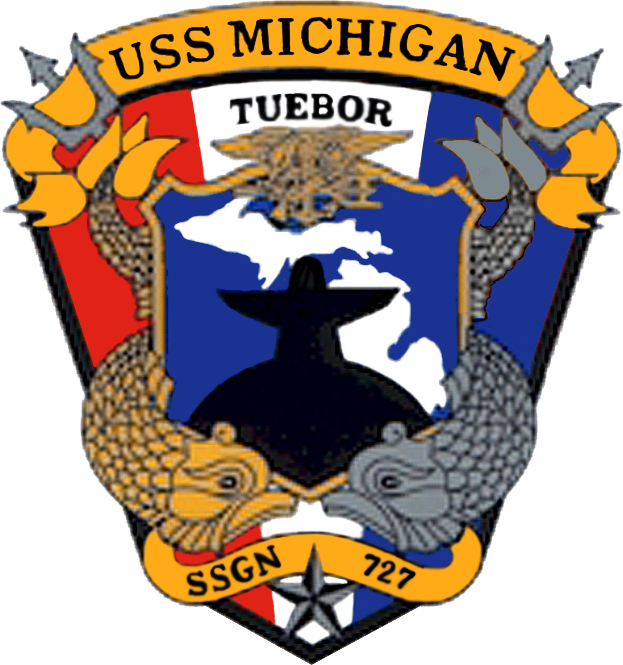
- Badge

General characteristics
- Class & type: Ohio-class
- Displacement: 16,764 long tons (17,033 t) surfaced; 18,750 long tons (19,050 t) submerged
- Length: 560 ft (170 m)
- Beam: 42 ft (13 m)
- Draft: 38 ft (12 m)
- Propulsion: 1 × S8G PWR nuclear reactor (HEU 93.5%); 2 × geared turbines; 1 × 325 hp (242 kW) auxiliary motor; 1 × shaft @ 60,000 shp (45,000 kW)
- Speed: Greater than 25 knots (46 km/h; 29 mph)
- Test depth: Greater than 800 feet (240 m)
- Complement: 15 officers; 140 enlisted
- Armament: 4 × 21 in (533 mm) torpedo tubes; 154 × BGM-109 Tomahawks in 22 groups of seven

USS Michigan (hull number SSBN-727/SSGN-727) is an Ohio-class nuclear-powered guided missile submarine (SSGN), converted from a ballistic missile submarine (SSBN), that is part of the United States Navy. She is the third vessel to bear the name of the U.S. state of Michigan.

== Construction and commissioning ==
Michigan was constructed at the Electric Boat Division of General Dynamics Corporation in Groton, Connecticut, and was commissioned on 11 September 1982. Michigan arrived in Bangor, Washington, on 16 March 1983 and completed sixty-six Strategic Deterrent Patrols. She was originally designed and commissioned as a ballistic missile submarine (SSBN) capable of deploying 24 Trident II submarine-launched ballistic missiles (SLBM) with nuclear warheads.

== Conversion to SSGN ==
As of June 2007, Michigan has been converted to an SSGN at the Puget Sound Naval Shipyard. Her hull classification symbol then changed from SSBN-727 to SSGN-727.

== Post-conversion ==
On 12 December 2009, Michigan returned to Naval Base Kitsap, her home base, completing her first deployment after the SSGN conversion. The deployment began 10 November 2008, and included numerous missions. The boat also completed several theater security cooperation engagements with Pacific Rim nations.

On 28 June 2010, Michigan was one of three Ohio-class submarines involved in a US response to Chinese missile testing in the contested East China Sea. Michigan, Ohio, and Florida all surfaced simultaneously in the waters of South Korea, the Philippines, and the British Indian Ocean Territory respectively.

In August 2016, CSC Dominique Saavedra embarked aboard Michigan and became the first enlisted female sailor to have earned her submarine qualification serving on a U.S. Navy submarine, the first boat specially modified with separate accommodations for enlisted female crew. (The first female, both officer and overall, was in 2011.)

On 25 April 2017, Michigan docked at Busan Naval Base, South Korea, during a time of heightened tensions with North Korea. She later joined the USS Carl Vinson Carrier Strike Group in the Sea of Japan for exercises. Photographs show a dry deck shelter mounted on Michigan.

Michigan returned to Busan Naval Base, South Korea on 15 June 2023, the day after North Korea fired two short-range missiles off its east coast. The visual display of the submarine - again with a mounted dry deck shelter - was done to demonstrate the US resolve to support and protect South Korea against North Korea's recent aggression.
