= Fisher Center for Alzheimer's Research Foundation =

Nonprofit organization in New York, United States

- Founded: 1995; 31 years ago
- Founder: Zachary Fisher; David Rockefeller
- Type: Non-profit organization
- Location: 750 Lexington Avenue, Suite 2400, New York, NY 10022
- Fields: Alzheimer's research
- Board of directors: Barry R. Sloane (Chairman); Martin Edelman; David H.W. Turner; Hadley M. Fisher; Manny Alvarez; Gerry Byrne; Betsy Gotbaum; James L. Nederlander; Richard J. Salem; Moshe Shike
- Affiliations: The Rockefeller University; New York University Grossman School of Medicine; NYU Langone Health; Institut des maladies génétiques Imagine
- Website: www.alzinfo.org

The Fisher Center for Alzheimer's Research Foundation is an American nonprofit organization that funds research into the causes, prevention, and treatment of Alzheimer's disease. Its mission is to understand the causes of Alzheimer's disease, improve the care of people living with it, and find a cure.

Zachary Fisher, a New York City businessman and philanthropist, created the organization in 1995 after his wife, Elizabeth Fisher, developed Alzheimer's disease, and he teamed up with philanthropist David Rockefeller to establish the Zachary and Elizabeth M. Fisher Center for Research on Alzheimer's Disease (also known as the Fisher Center Lab) at The Rockefeller University. The Foundation continues to support the Fisher Center Lab, which until 2019 was directed by the Nobel laureate Paul Greengard. It funds additional programs in neuroscience, genomics, artificial intelligence, and translational and clinical research at Rockefeller, NYU Langone Health, New York University Grossman School of Medicine, and the Institut des maladies génétiques Imagine (also known as the Imagine Institute) in Paris, France.

The Foundation operates an Information Program that provides public education about Alzheimer's disease and dementia through its website ALZinfo.org, print and digital publications, caregiving resources, and support services. These include the magazine Preserving Your Memory, the biweekly newsletter Alzheimer's Research News You Can Use, the research series INFOcus, the Alzheimer's Resource Locator, and the Caregiver's Corner resource portal.

== History ==
When Elizabeth Fisher was diagnosed with Alzheimer's disease, her husband, New York City real estate developer and philanthropist Zachary Fisher, partnered with their friend David Rockefeller to start the Zachary and Elizabeth M. Fisher Center for Research on Alzheimer's Disease at The Rockefeller University (the Fisher Center Lab) in New York City.

The neuroscientist Paul Greengard directed the Fisher Center Lab from its founding until his death in 2019. The Lab was then led by interim laboratory head Marc Flajolet and advised by a Neuroscience Advisory Committee including Nobel laureates Torsten Wiesel, Michael W. Young, and other faculty members from The Rockefeller University. In 2022, the neuroscientist Nathaniel Heintz was appointed as new director of the Fisher Center Lab.

The Fisher Center for Alzheimer's Research Foundation, a 501(c)(3) charitable organization, was founded by Zachary Fisher in 1995. The Foundation raises funds via contributions from the public to support the Fisher Center Lab and Alzheimer's research at other labs around the globe. The Foundation has been designated a four-star charity by Charity Navigator every year since 2010, and it has received a Gold Seal of Transparency from Candid GuideStar every year since 2018.

The Foundation's longtime President and CEO was Kent Karosen, a New York City-based businessman and philanthropist. Karosen was also the co-author, along with Chana Stiefel, of Why Can't Grandma Remember My Name?, a children's book about Alzheimer's disease published by the Foundation in 2016. Karosen died in 2018. Since 2020, the Foundation has been led by the Executive Director Lucretia Holden.

== Research ==
The Fisher Center for Alzheimer's Research Foundation funds research on Alzheimer's disease and neurodegeneration at several institutions. Its research support has included neuroscience, genomics, artificial intelligence, translational research, drug discovery, clinical research, and studies of patient care.

=== The Rockefeller University ===
==== Fisher Center Lab ====
The Foundation's longest-running partnership is with The Rockefeller University in New York City. Since its establishment, the Foundation has supported the Zachary and Elizabeth M. Fisher Center for Research on Alzheimer's Disease, commonly known as the Fisher Center Lab. Paul Greengard served as the laboratory's founding director until his death in 2019. Nathaniel Heintz was appointed director in 2022, and in honor of Greengard's research, in 2017 The Rockefeller University announced the establishment of the Paul Greengard Professorship with a gift from the Foundation.

During Greengard's tenure, Fisher Center researchers reported several findings concerning the production of amyloid-beta, a protein fragment that accumulates in the brains of people with Alzheimer's disease. In 2003, they found that the cancer drug imatinib (Gleevec) reduced amyloid-beta production in cellular and animal models without interfering with Notch, a protein involved in normal cell development and communication. In 2010, Greengard and colleagues identified gamma-secretase activating protein (GSAP), a protein that helps regulate the production of amyloid-beta, showing that GSAP reduction lowered amyloid-beta levels and plaque formation in an Alzheimer's disease mouse model. The researchers proposed that targeting GSAP could provide a way to reduce amyloid-beta without disrupting other important cellular functions.

Another study published in 2020 examined C99, a fragment of the amyloid precursor protein from which amyloid-beta is produced. In postmortem human brain tissue, C99 accumulated preferentially in neurons that are especially vulnerable to Alzheimer's disease, and higher C99 levels were associated with greater cognitive impairment. By contrast, amyloid-beta levels were elevated in both vulnerable and relatively resistant brain regions, suggesting that C99 itself may contribute to neuronal damage in Alzheimer's disease.

Under Heintz, the Fisher Center Lab is now examining the molecular and cellular mechanisms involved in Alzheimer's disease and other neurodegenerative disorders, including differences between neuronal populations that are vulnerable or resistant to disease. A 2020 study involving Heintz and other Lab researchers investigated why some types of neurons are damaged earlier than others in Alzheimer's disease. By combining molecular profiles of specific neuron types with genetic and postmortem human-brain data, they identified a network of genes associated with neurons that are especially vulnerable to the disease. The network included processes involved in remodeling connections between nerve cells and was influenced by both aging and amyloid-beta accumulation.

Building on that work, a 2024 study identified DEK, a protein involved in regulating gene activity, as one factor that may contribute to the early vulnerability of neurons in the entorhinal cortex, a brain region affected early in Alzheimer's disease.

In 2026, Heintz's team published a method called mFISH3D for mapping different types of cells throughout intact brain tissue. The technique can simultaneously detect ten types of messenger RNA—molecules that reflect which genes are active in a cell—and was demonstrated in both mouse and human brain tissue. The researchers combined the imaging method with an artificial-intelligence system that can identify and map cells with less need for researchers to label examples manually. The approach was developed in part to study why some types of brain cells are more vulnerable to disease than others.

==== Additional programs ====
In addition to the Fisher Center Lab, the Foundation has partnered with Rockefeller to create other research programs dedicated to the study of Alzheimer's disease and neurodegeneration.

In 2021, Sidney Strickland was named the inaugural Zachary and Elizabeth M. Fisher Professor in Alzheimer's and Neurodegenerative Disease. Strickland's research examines the role of cerebrovascular dysfunction, blood coagulation, and inflammation in Alzheimer's disease and other neurodegenerative disorders. In 2024, his team reported a possible mechanism through which the Alzheimer's drug lecanemab may act, showing that it prevented amyloid-beta from binding to fibrinogen, a protein involved in blood clotting. In experimental models, blocking this interaction reduced abnormal clot formation and damage to the connections between nerve cells. The researchers suggested that this vascular effect may contribute to lecanemab's protective effects in Alzheimer's disease.

Also in 2021, the Foundation created the Fisher Fellows in Neuroscience program at Rockefeller, which supports selected third- and fourth-year students in the David Rockefeller Graduate Program pursuing research in neuroscience.

In 2022, a Foundation grant established the Zachary and Elizabeth M. Fisher Fund for Translational Research in Alzheimer's and Neurodegenerative Disease. The fund has supported projects intended to translate discoveries in basic science into potential approaches for the detection, prevention, and treatment of neurodegenerative disease. As part of this initiative, the university's High Throughput and Spectroscopy Resource Center became the Fisher Drug Discovery Resource Center, which provides scientists with resources for assay development, high-throughput screening, compound characterization, and other aspects of early-stage drug discovery.

The center has supported several projects conducted by the Foundation's programs and contributed to additional studies of potential therapeutic targets in Alzheimer's disease. In 2025, it collaborated in a study with Weill Cornell Medicine in which researchers screened more than 300,000 small molecules for inhibitors of cGAS, a protein involved in inflammatory immune signaling that is being investigated as a potential therapeutic target in Alzheimer's and related disorders. In another 2025 study, researchers used the center's instrumentation to develop a high-throughput method for screening compounds that bind to TREM2, an immune-cell receptor genetically linked to Alzheimer's disease, establishing a method that could be used in larger searches for potential TREM2-targeting compounds.

In 2024, Junyue Cao was appointed as the inaugural Fisher Center Foundation Assistant Professor at The Rockefeller University. He was promoted to Fisher Center Foundation Associate Professor effective in 2026. Cao directs the Laboratory of Single-Cell Genomics and Population Dynamics, which develops genomic technologies to study cellular changes during aging and diseases including Alzheimer's disease. In 2026, the lab introduced IRISeq, a method that maps the location and molecular activity of cells across brain tissue without relying on conventional microscopy, and EnrichSci, a method for isolating and studying rare cell populations in greater detail. Using IRISeq, researchers identified clusters of inflammatory cells in aging brain white matter and found that immune cells called lymphocytes contributed to localized inflammation. Using EnrichSci, they identified aging-related molecular changes in oligodendrocytes, cells that support and insulate nerve fibers and are implicated in neurodegenerative disease.

Also in 2024, the Foundation supported the creation of the Fisher Artificial Intelligence Platform to Advance Research in Alzheimer's and Neurodegenerative Diseases (the Fisher AI Platform). Developed in collaboration with Rockefeller's Data Science Platform, the initiative provides computational infrastructure and machine-learning expertise for biological research at the university.

In 2026, Rockefeller neuroscientist Priya Rajasethupathy became head of the Fisher Center Targeted Therapies Initiative for Memory Loss in Alzheimer's Disease (also known as the Fisher Memory Initiative). The program studies the neural circuits and molecular mechanisms involved in memory, including interactions between the thalamus, hippocampus, and other brain regions involved in memory formation and retrieval. In 2026, Rajasethupathy's team reported in Nature that long-term memories appear to be maintained through a sequence of gene-regulating processes that unfold over time across different parts of the brain. Experiments in mice showed that one regulatory protein, CAMTA1, was required to maintain memories over the first several days, while two others, TCF4 and ASH1L, became important later for preserving memories over a period of weeks. The findings suggested that long-term memory is maintained through a series of molecular stages rather than through a single biological switch.

=== New York University ===
The Foundation supports a number of Alzheimer's disease research and clinical programs at New York University.

The Zachary and Elizabeth M. Fisher Alzheimer's Disease Education and Research Program at NYU Grossman School of Medicine funds research into the clinical progression and treatment of Alzheimer's disease and approaches to patient care. The program was created under the direction of neurologist Barry Reisberg, whose research included the development of the Functional Assessment Staging (FAST) scale for Alzheimer’s disease. It is currently co-directed by the neurologist Martin Sadowski and Sunnie Kenowsky.

The program has studied approaches to improving care for people with more advanced Alzheimer's disease. In a randomized controlled trial published in 2017, 20 patient-caregiver pairs received either usual community care or a comprehensive, individualized care-management program in addition to standard medication. Participants receiving the care-management program showed better outcomes on measures of overall clinical condition, daily functioning, and behavioral symptoms than those receiving usual care.

In 2020, Reisberg, Kenowsky, and colleagues also reported evidence of measurable changes on cognitive tests occurring before people themselves noticed any decline in memory or thinking. The researchers termed this stage "psychometric cognitive decline" and proposed that it may precede subjective cognitive decline in some individuals who later progress toward Alzheimer's disease.

As the program's new co-director, Sadowski was named the inaugural Zachary and Elizabeth M. Fisher Professor of Neurodegeneration and Alzheimer's Disease. His laboratory conducts translational research into mechanisms of neurodegeneration and potential Alzheimer's disease therapeutics, including research involving interactions between astrocytes and microglia.

In 2023, a Fisher-supported study tested whether light flashing 40 times per second could influence rhythmic brain activity and reduce Alzheimer's-related pathology. Sadowski and colleagues found that the stimulation did not reliably produce the expected brain rhythms in deeper regions such as the hippocampus and did not reduce amyloid-beta plaques in two mouse models of Alzheimer's disease. The findings challenged earlier reports that 40-Hz visual stimulation might provide a noninvasive way to modify Alzheimer's pathology.

The Foundation and NYU Langone Health also established the Fisher Center Alzheimer's Clinical Trials Program, directed by Sadowski. The program conducts investigator-initiated clinical studies of Alzheimer's disease treatments, including studies designed to examine treatment strategies and patient populations that may not be addressed in commercially sponsored trials.

=== Imagine Institute ===
Since 2019, the Foundation has supported Alzheimer's disease research led by physician-scientist Olivier Hermine at the Institut des maladies génétiques Imagine (the Imagine Institute) in Paris, France. Hermine's research investigates the role of mast cells, a type of immune cell, in Alzheimer's disease pathology and how mast cells and other immune cells may contribute to neuroinflammation. The work has also examined the mechanisms of drugs targeting mast cells and microglia.

Hermine coauthored a 2023 randomized phase 3 clinical trial of masitinib, a drug that acts on mast cells and microglia. Among participants receiving 4.5 mg/kg per day, the drug produced a statistically significant advantage over placebo on a measure of cognitive performance. The study's measure of daily functioning did not meet its prespecified threshold for statistical significance, while results from a separate higher-dose group were inconclusive; the investigators called for a confirmatory trial.

=== Further research ===
In addition to its programs at The Rockefeller University, NYU, and the Imagine Institute, the Foundation has provided support for research at other institutions in the United States and abroad.

In 2011, it awarded a grant to support research led by the neurologist Per Svenningsson at the Karolinska Institutet in Stockholm, Sweden. Svenningsson and his colleagues in the Department of Clinical Neuroscience studied molecular mechanisms involved in neurological disorders, including Alzheimer's disease, and potential approaches to treatment.

In 2018, the Foundation supported research led by neuroimmunologist Michal Schwartz at the Weizmann Institute of Science in Rehovot, Israel. The project investigated interactions between the immune system and the brain in Alzheimer's disease, including mechanisms through which immune cells might influence disease-related pathology.

During the COVID-19 pandemic, the Foundation also provided funding for research led by the immunologist Jean-Laurent Casanova into the genetic and immunological factors associated with life-threatening COVID-19. Casanova's research identified inborn genetic errors and autoantibodies affecting type I interferon responses in some patients with severe disease.

== Information Program ==
The Fisher Center for Alzheimer's Research Foundation operates an Information Program that provides public education and resources about Alzheimer's disease and dementia. The program curates findings from scientific studies and disseminates information about research, diagnosis, treatment, disease management, caregiving, and support services through its website, publications, and public outreach.

=== Publications and research communication ===
The program's principal online platform is ALZinfo.org, which provides information about Alzheimer's research and treatment as well as resources for patients, families, and caregivers. The Foundation also publishes Alzheimer's Research News You Can Use, a free biweekly digital newsletter covering developments in Alzheimer's and dementia research, brain health, caregiving, prevention, diagnosis, and treatment.

The Information Program also produces INFOcus, a series of in-depth articles and interviews about research supported by the Foundation and the scientists conducting it. The series has featured researchers at The Rockefeller University, NYU Grossman School of Medicine, the Imagine Institute, and other Foundation-supported programs.

Since 2007, the Foundation has published Preserving Your Memory, a triannual magazine covering Alzheimer's research, caregiving, healthy living, disease management, and related topics. The publication is available in print and digital formats, and the Foundation maintains an online archive of past issues.

The Information Program also distributes educational brochures and resource guides addressing subjects including Alzheimer's signs and symptoms, the clinical stages of the disease, the distinction between Alzheimer's disease and dementia, and guidance for patients and caregivers.

=== Caregiving and support resources ===
The Information Program maintains an Alzheimer's Resource Locator, which allows users to search by ZIP code, category, and distance for healthcare providers and other Alzheimer's- and dementia-related services. Listings include physicians, care facilities, home health agencies, long-term-care services, legal assistance, and other resources.

Its Caregiver's Corner brings together information and guidance for people caring for individuals with Alzheimer's disease. Its resources address daily care and routines; behavior, communication, and symptoms; caregiver well-being; legal, financial, and long-term-care planning; medical management; and transitions and late-stage care.

Through Ask the Experts, visitors can also submit questions concerning Alzheimer's disease, dementia, caregiving, and related topics. The Information Program additionally disseminates research news, caregiving information, and public-education materials through social media and awareness campaigns.

=== Awards and recognition ===
The Information Program and its publications and digital resources have received recognition from health-information, digital-media, and communications awards programs, including the Anthem Awards, Digital Health Awards, National Health Information Awards, w3 Awards, Hermes Creative Awards, MarCom Awards, and Davey Awards. Recognized resources have included ALZinfo.org, Preserving Your Memory, Alzheimer's Research News You Can Use, INFOcus, the Alzheimer's Resource Locator, Caregiver's Corner, and the Foundation's public-education initiatives.
