= Fisher House UK =

Organization

Fisher House UK is based in the grounds of the Queen Elizabeth Hospital Birmingham. With the slogan of "a home away from home for military patients and their families", the Fisher House provides a sanctuary for the families of military patients receiving treatment at the hospital. As the Queen Elizabeth Hospital is the centre for military medicine in the United Kingdom, some families have to travel hundreds of miles to be with their loved one.

== Facilities ==
The house has eighteen large family bedrooms, complete with disability access, three lounges (one complete with projector screen and large DVD selection), a spacious kitchen and dining room, a children's playroom, and a spacious garden. The building follows the architectural design of similar houses in the United States of America, within the Fisher House Foundation.

== History ==
Fisher House was opened officially in April 2013 by Prince Charles. Thus far, it has given over ten thousand nights of accommodation.

== Fundraising ==
Fisher House UK was brought into existence from donations from the Fisher House Foundation, Queen Elizabeth Hospital Birmingham Charity, and Help for Heroes.

Fisher House UK is the recipient of the Warwickshire Freemasons 2028 tercentenary charity appeal. The appeal aims to raise a considerable sum of money to support the work of the facility, and has ready donated in excess of £600,000 which covers most of the running costs since the appeal was launched. In November 2024, representatives from Fisher House UK and the Freemasons were interviewed on Craftcast, the official podcast of the United Grand Lodge of England to discuss the work done and the charitable appeal.
