= Jeff Sutton (real estate developer) =

American real estate developer (born 1960)

- Born: 1960 (age 65–66)
- Education: University of Pennsylvania
- Occupation: Real estate developer
- Known for: Founder of Wharton Properties
- Spouse: Rachel Sutton
- Children: 5

Jeff Sutton (born 1960) is an American billionaire real estate developer and the founder of Wharton Properties. In August 2024, his net worth was estimated at $2.7 billion by Forbes.

== Early life ==
Jeff Sutton was born into a Syrian Jewish family, in Gravesend, Brooklyn. His father was an importer of retail goods. In 1981, he graduated with a B.A./B.S. from the University of Pennsylvania.

== Career ==
Wanting to get into New York real estate and lacking the funding to compete with established real estate families (e.g. Dursts, Roses, Fishers, Rudins, Tishmans, and the Lefraks), Sutton took a different tack: he would first find a potential tenant, determine where they wanted a store, and then seek to buy out the lease from the tenant at the location. In some cases, he would buy out the landlord using the signed lease as support to secure financing in order to buy the property.

In the early 1990s, his strategy worked with Payless Shoes in upper Manhattan, Brooklyn, the Bronx, and Queens. In the late 1990s, he applied the same approach with CVS Pharmacy in lower Manhattan partnering with New York City's largest landlord, SL Green Realty. Sutton emphasizes securing triple-A national retail chains as tenants.

=== Transactions ===
Significant properties include:

- the American Eagle Outfitters store at the corner of Broadway and Houston Street;
- 717 Fifth Avenue with the Armani flagship store;
- 720 Fifth Avenue with the Abercrombie & Fitch store;
- 609 Fifth Avenue with the American Girl store;
- 1551 Broadway in Times Square with the American Eagle Outfitters flagship store;
- 1515 Broadway with the Aeropostale lease;
- 141 Fifth Avenue in the Flatiron Building with the Cole Haan store;
- 379 West Broadway with the Polo Ralph Lauren store;
- 747 Madison Avenue with the Valentino flagship store; and
- 1552 Broadway, the site of the Times Square T.G.I. Friday's.

As of 2013, Wharton Properties owned 120 properties throughout New York City.

== Personal life ==
Sutton and his wife, Rachel, have five children. In June 2013, he purchased a residential property in Deal, New Jersey for $22.6 million.
