= Svenningsson =

Svenningsson is a surname. Notable people with the surname include:

- Per Svenningsson (born 1968), Swedish neurologist
- Uno Svenningsson (born 1959), Swedish pop singer-songwriter and guitarist
