= Fisher Brothers =

Privately owned Real Estate Firm in New York City

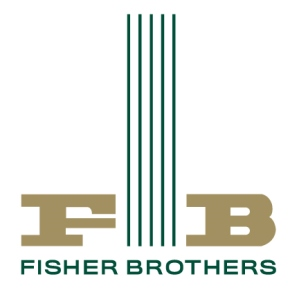
- Company type: Private
- Industry: Real estate development Investment company
- Founded: 1985; 41 years ago
- Founders: Martin Fisher; Larry Fisher; Zachary Fisher
- Headquarters: New York City, United States
- Key people: Arnold Fisher (senior partner)
- Website: fisherbrothers.com

Fisher Brothers is a real estate firm in New York City. It was formed by Martin Fisher born in 1915, and later joined by his brothers Larry (born 1907) and Zachary (born 1910). The Fisher family has substantial real estate holdings in New York City and elsewhere and are considered one of the "royal families" of New York real estate, alongside the Dursts, Roses, Rudins, and Tishmans.

== History ==
The Fisher family's construction company was founded in 1915 by Martin Fisher. Later, his brothers Larry and Zachary joined to form Fisher Brothers. They built homes in Brooklyn, Queens, Long Island, Riverdale, and Mount Vernon. By the mid-1950s, they had branched out into commercial construction and management. In the 1960s, Fisher Brothers continued to diversify, developing Midtown Manhattan office buildings at 1345 Avenue of the Americas, 605 Third Ave., and 299 Park Ave.

Second-generation partners Richard, Anthony, and Arnold Fisher led the firm in the 1980s, brokering deals which included the acquisition of a nine-acre parcel south of the United Nations Headquarters, one of the city's largest available development sites, and the expansion of the Securities and Exchange Commission headquarters in Washington.

The family invested in other businesses including banking and once owned a stake in CBS. The company has been listed in the Fortune 500.

In 2004, Fisher Brothers partnered with Morgan Stanley to form the $770 million City Investment Fund, intended to stimulate investment in Manhattan in the wake of the September 11 attacks.

The firm is currently led by second-generation partner Arnold Fisher as well as third-generation partners Kenneth, Steven, and Winston Fisher.

== Properties ==
The firm manages 6.5 million square feet in commercial property in New York City, including Park Avenue Plaza, 1345 Avenue of the Americas, 299 Park Avenue, 49 East 52nd Street, and 605 Third Avenue. It also manages 1.5 million square feet of commercial property in the Station Place complex in Washington, DC.

Residential properties in New York include Beekman Tower, Chartwell House, 101 W. 87th Street, 111 Murray Street, 225 E. 39th Street, and 37 Warren Street.

== Philanthropy ==
The Fisher Brothers Foundation supports charities including New York Presbyterian Hospital, New York's Finest Foundation, the Police Athletic League of New York City, and Lincoln Center.

Larry and Zachary Fisher were instrumental in the establishment of the Intrepid Sea, Air & Space Museum.

Zachary Fisher founded the Fisher House Foundation, which builds residential properties near military and VA medical centers, offering free lodging to family members of hospitalized military personnel.

The Fishers also founded the Intrepid Fallen Heroes Fund, which gives aid to families of U.S. soldiers who died while in military service and builds centers for the treatment of combat trauma.

== Leadership ==
The firm's partners are Kenneth Fisher, Steven Fisher, Winston Fisher, and Martin Edelman. The CFO is Sam Rosenberg.
