= Larry Fisher =

American real estate developer and philanthropist (1907–2001)

- Born: June 6, 1907
- Died: February 4, 2001 (aged 93); Palm Beach, Florida
- Occupation: Real estate developer
- Known for: Co-founder of Fisher Brothers
- Spouse: Kathleen Fisher
- Children: 2
- Family: Zachary Fisher (brother); Martin Fisher (brother)

Larry Fisher (June 6, 1907 – February 4, 2001) was an American real estate developer and philanthropist who co-founded the Fisher Brothers real estate development company.

== Biography ==
Born to a Jewish family in Brooklyn, New York, the son of a bricklayer immigrant from Russia who taught his sons masonry. Fisher never finished high school but followed his father and worked as a bricklayer. In 1915, he and his brothers, Martin and Zachary, founded Fisher Brothers, first working as contractors building homes outside Manhattan. The brothers divided the responsibilities with Larry being responsible for site assembly, all financing, and overall development. Fisher Brothers eventually became one of the real estate industry's largest residential and commercial developers in New York, owning more than five million square feet of office space. Fisher Brothers built 400 Park Avenue, 1185 Avenue of the Americas, Bankers Trust Plaza, Imperial House, and 50 Sutton Place South. Fisher Brothers portfolio included 1345 Avenue of the Americas, Park Avenue Plaza, 299 Park Avenue, and 605 Third Avenue.

== Philanthropy ==
Fisher served on the board of directors of the Trooper Foundation-State of New York, the Police Athletic Foundation, New York's Finest Foundation, New York City Mission Society Cadet Corps, and the Veterans Bedside Network. He supported various Jewish charities and causes including the United Jewish Appeal Federation of New York, Temple Israel, Jewish Memorial Hospital, and he endowed the Fisher Brothers Center for Strategic Studies of Air Power at the Israeli Air Force Center. Fisher also served as a chairman of instructional television for the Archdiocese of New York; and helped to establish the Fisher House Foundation with his brother which built lodging on military bases for the families of the wounded. He and his brother were also known for donating $10,000 to the families of all New York City police officer that were killed in the line of duty.

== Personal life ==
Fisher had one son from his first marriage, Arnold Fisher, a partner in Fisher Brothers. In his 70s, he married his second wife, Kathleen Fisher. Fisher died at his home in Palm Beach, Florida. Richard L. Fisher, the son of his brother Martin, was also a partner in the firm until his untimely death in 2006.
