= Edward Jacobson (physician) =

Edward Jacobson is an American gynecologist, specializing in cosmetic and restorative vaginal surgery. He serves as an expert to the media regarding vaginal rejuvenation and labiaplasty.

== Career ==
Jacobson is a board-certified gynecologist and Fellow of the American College of Obstetricians and Gynecologists with offices in Greenwich, Connecticut and Beverly Hills, California. He performs general gynecology, vaginal rejuvenation, labiaplasty and bioidentical hormone replacement.

== Media ==
Jacobson has appeared as an expert regarding vaginal rejuvenation on Fox News Channel's Health Talk with Dr. Manny. His expert opinion and practice has been featured in The New York Times, The Wall Street Journal, The Times, The Journal News, Grazia, Woman, and Tatler.
