= 111 Murray Street =

Residential skyscraper in Manhattan, New York

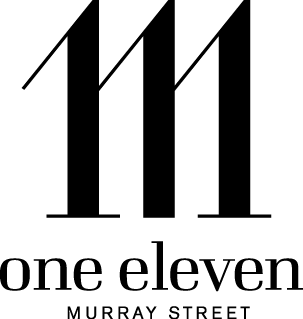

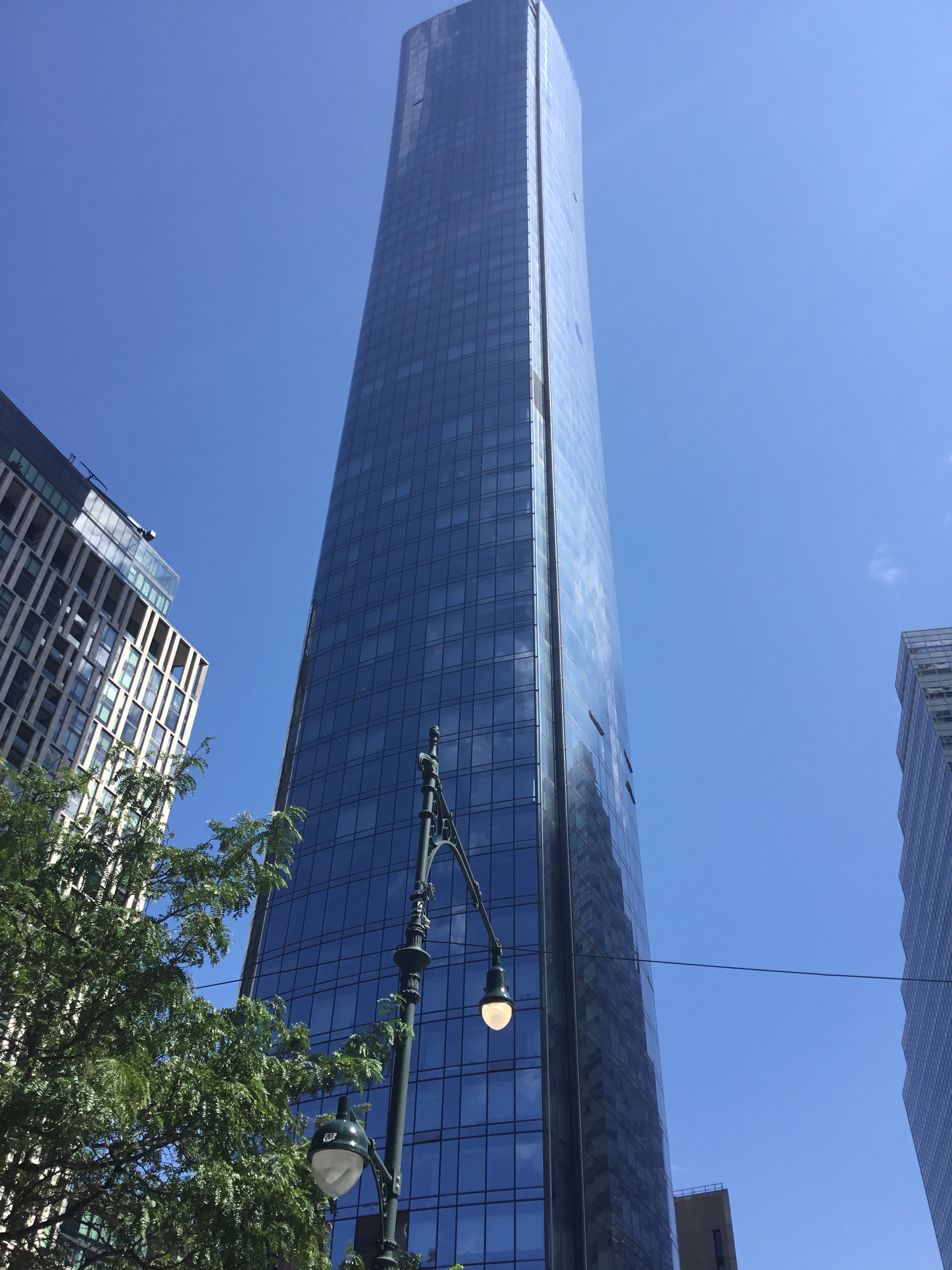
- 111 Murray Street in 2022
- Interactive map of the 111 Murray Street area

General information
- Status: Completed
- Type: Residential, retail
- Location: 111 Murray Street; Manhattan, New York City
- Coordinates: 40°42′56″N 74°00′46″W
- Construction started: 2015
- Completed: February 16, 2018

Height
- Architectural: 792 ft (241 m)
- Roof: 749 feet (228 m)

Technical details
- Floor count: 58
- Floor area: 372,000 sqft (34,560 sqm)

Design and construction
- Architects: Kohn Pedersen Fox, Goldstein, Hill & West Architects
- Developer: Witkoff Group, Fisher Brothers

Website
- 111murray.com

111 Murray Street (formerly known as 101 Murray Street or 101 Tribeca) is a residential skyscraper completed in 2018 in Manhattan, New York City. Developed by Witkoff Group and Fisher Brothers, the building is located at the intersection of Murray and West Streets, in the Financial District and Tribeca neighborhoods and close to Battery Park City.

== Architecture ==
According to Winston C. Fisher, of Fisher Brothers, the building has 156 luxury condominiums. The tower stands 792 feet (241.4 m) to its pinnacle and has 2,100 square feet (195 sqm) of retail space on the ground floor. The building is the third tallest structure in the local area, after 30 Park Place and 56 Leonard Street, matching the height of the Woolworth Building. A 10,600 square-foot (985 sqm) plaza sits adjacent to the tower.

== Construction ==
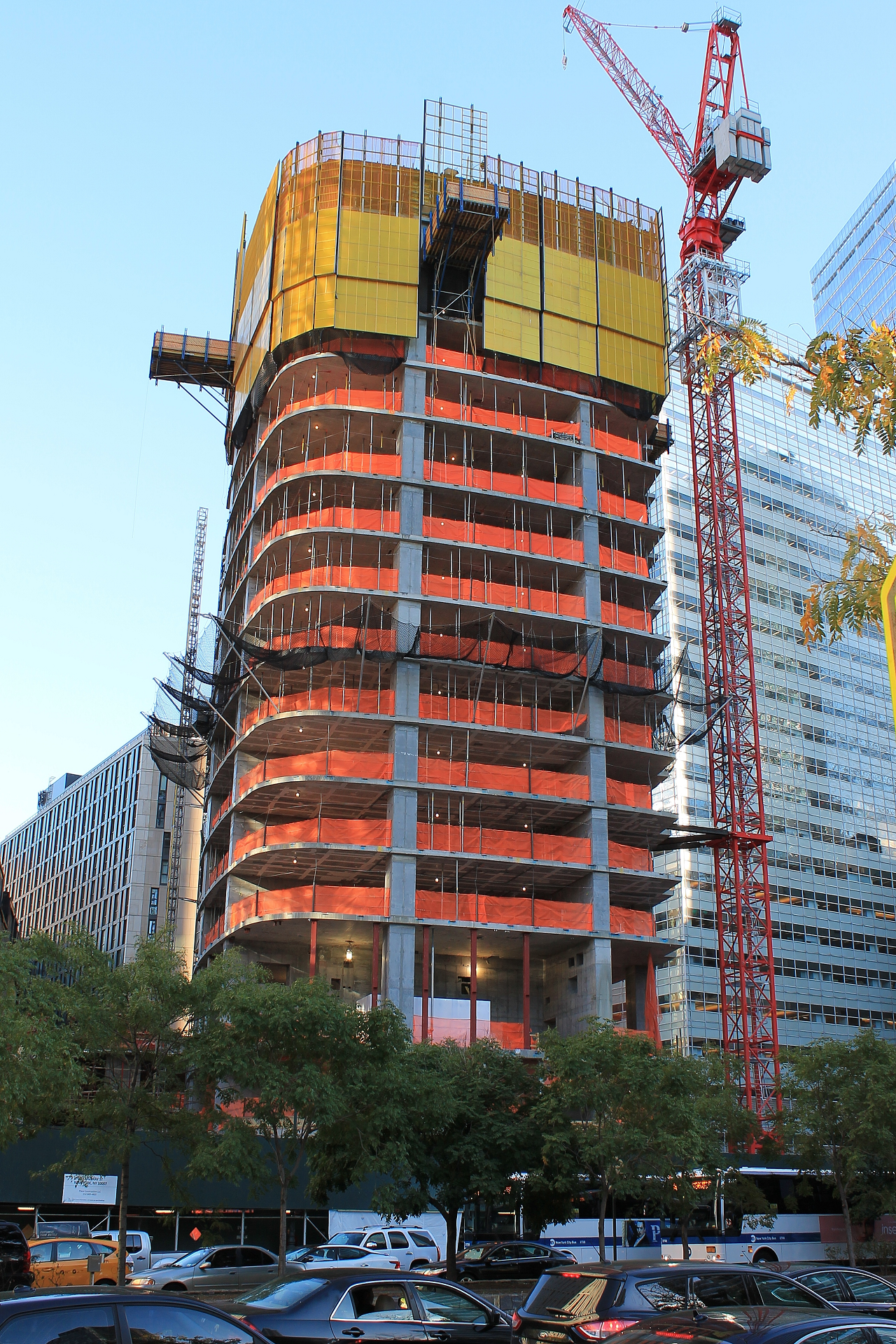
Construction progress in October 2016

The tower was constructed at the site of the former St. John's University building at 101 Murray Street, which the developers purchased for $200 million in May 2013. In May 2015, the developers finalized the project's financing after securing an equity investment from a Chinese insurance company and a $445 million construction loan from The Blackstone Group, Deutsche Bank, and M&T Bank. By summer 2015, demolition of the previous structure was complete and construction of the foundation commenced. The building topped out in 2018.

== Notable residents ==
The building's current residents include former Mets pitcher John Franco. They formerly included American attorney Michael Cohen.

== See also ==
- List of tallest buildings in New York City
- List of tallest buildings in the United States
