= 1345 Avenue of the Americas =

Office skyscraper in Manhattan, New York

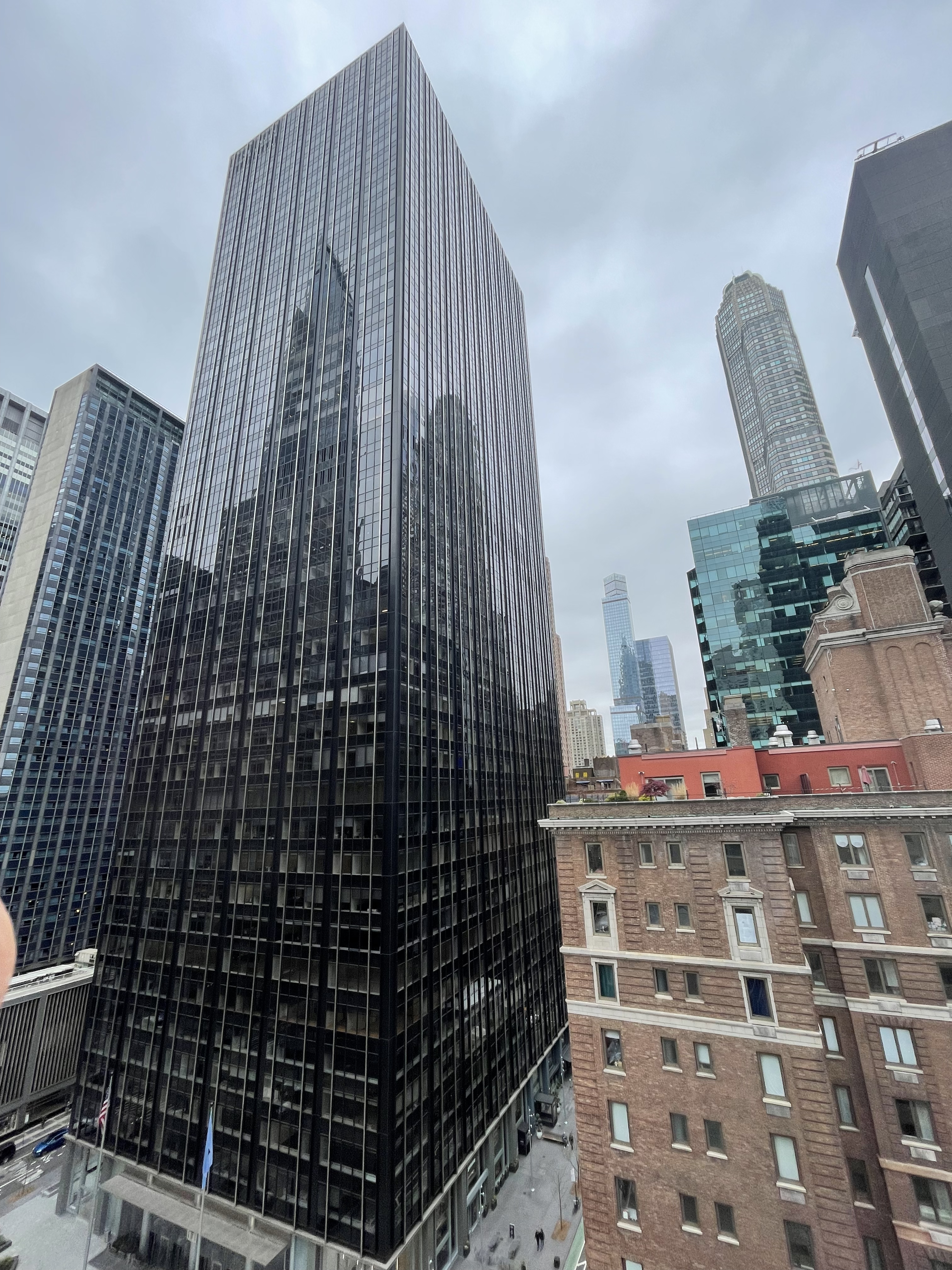
- April, 2022
- Interactive map of the 1345 Avenue of the Americas area
- Former names: Burlington House
- Alternative names: AllianceBernstein Building

General information
- Type: Commercial
- Location: 1345 6th Avenue; New York, New York, U.S.
- Coordinates: 40.763074°N 73.978752°W
- Construction started: 1966
- Completed: 1969
- Owner: Fisher Brothers

Height
- Roof: 625 ft (191 m)
- Top floor: 605 feet (184 m)

Technical details
- Floor count: 50
- Floor area: 1,998,994 sq ft (185,713 m^{2})
- Lifts/elevators: 36

Design and construction
- Architects: Emery Roth & Sons
- Developer: Fisher Brothers

1345 Avenue of the Americas (also known as the AllianceBernstein Building and formerly the Burlington House) is a 625-foot (191 m)-tall, 50-story skyscraper in Midtown Manhattan, New York City. Located on Sixth Avenue between 54th and 55th Streets, the building was built by Fisher Brothers and designed by Emery Roth & Sons. When completed in 1969, the building was originally named after Burlington Industries.

1345 Avenue of the Americas is an unrelieved slab structure in the International Style, sometimes referred to as "corporate" style, faced with dark glass. The building replaced the original Ziegfeld Theatre on the site. Its small plaza had two fountains on each street corner shaped like a dandelion seedheads, designed by Australian architect Robert Woodward in 1968. The fountains were of similar design to his 1961 El Alamein Fountain in Kings Cross, Sydney. The fountains were removed when the plaza was upgraded in 2019.

In 2025, Blackstone Inc. offered to buy an ownership stake in 1345 Avenue of the Americas from Fisher Brothers, obtaining an $850 million mortgage loan to finance the purchase.

== First public cellphone call ==
A base station atop the building was used on April 3, 1973, by Martin Cooper to make the world's first handheld cellular phone call in public. Cooper, a Motorola inventor, called rival Joel S. Engel of Bell Labs to tell him about the invention. Engel was staying across the street in the Hilton New York.

== In popular culture ==
In the film Spider-Man 3 (2007), 1345 Avenue of the Americas is the building Gwen Stacy falls from in the crane scene. It also serves as the foyer for the fictional law firm in the film Michael Clayton (2007). It is used as the establishing shot for the corporate headquarters of the fictional company, Dunder Mifflin in the television show The Office. The southeast corner housed The Mill, and it offered an eight minute ride on a moving walkway, that took visitors past knitting machines, and looms. The free attraction lasted until 1980. Today, a business took over the site.

== Tenants ==
- American Institute of Certified Public Accountants
- BBVA
- First Eagle Funds
- Fortress Investment Group
- CityMD
- OpenAI
- QuadReal Property Group
- Paul, Weiss, Rifkind, Wharton & Garrison
- Blackbird Worldwide
- Ground Alliance
- Netquall

== See also ==
- List of tallest buildings in New York City

== Gallery ==
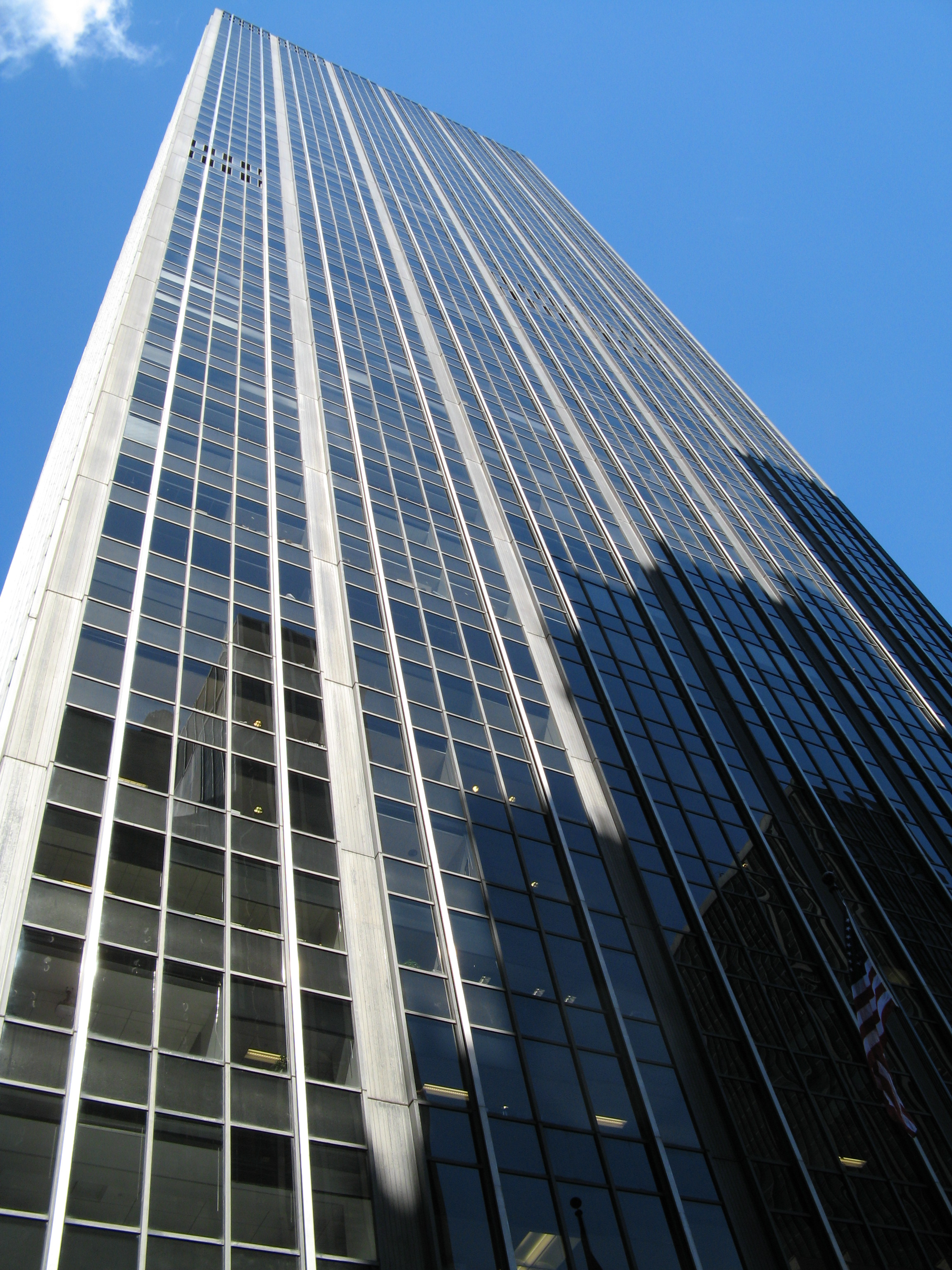
September, 2007

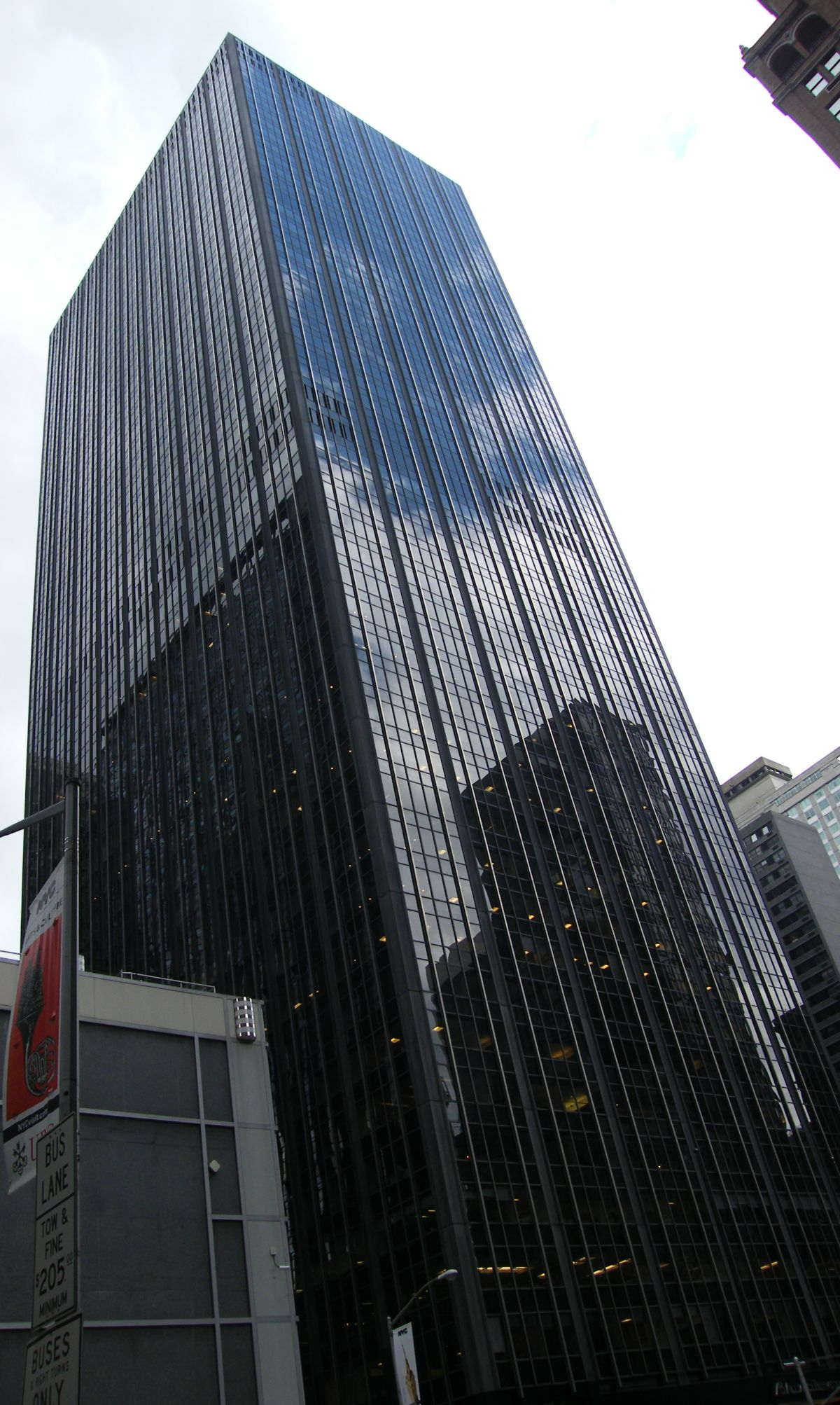
September, 2008

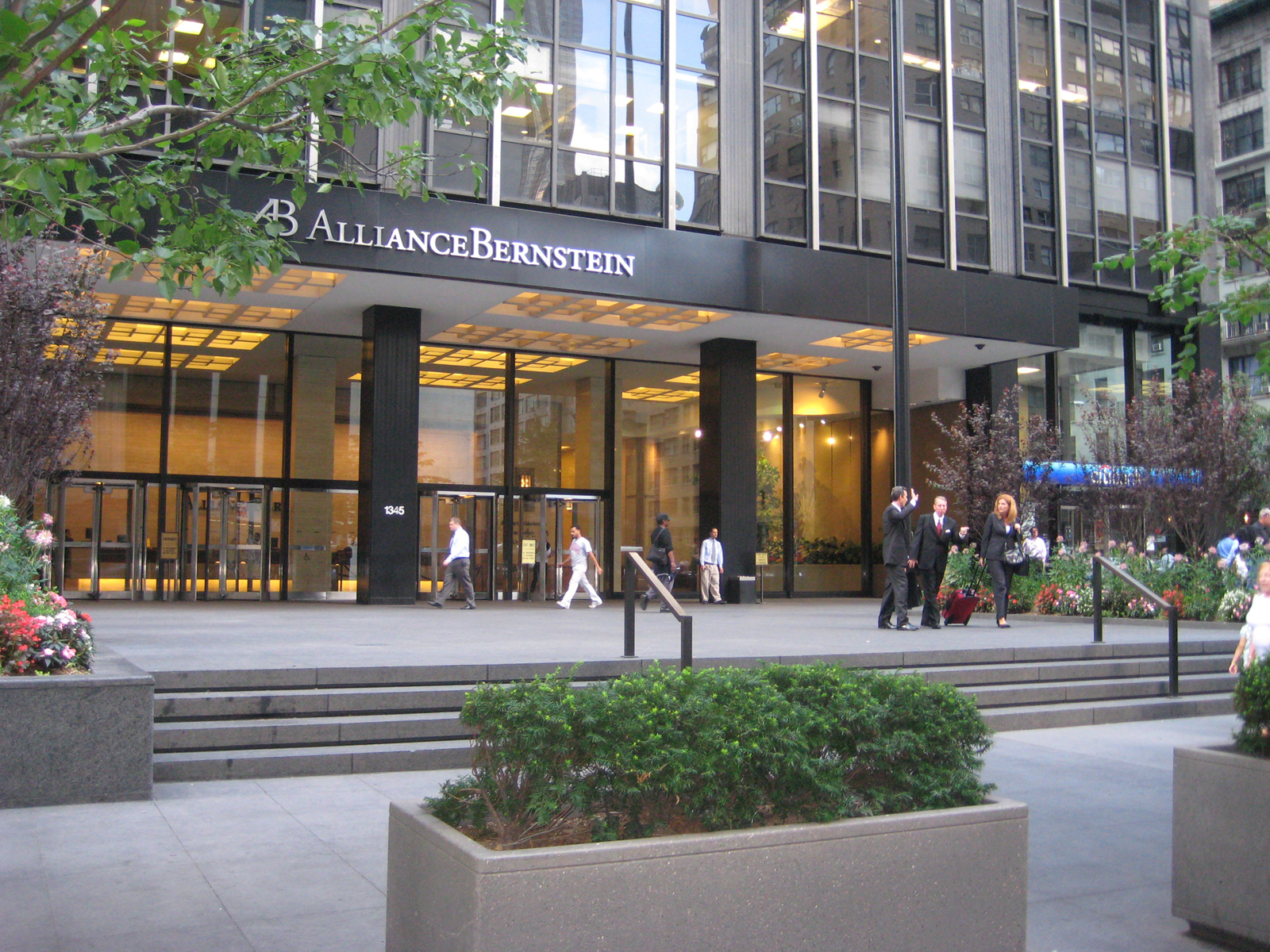
entrance - August, 2010

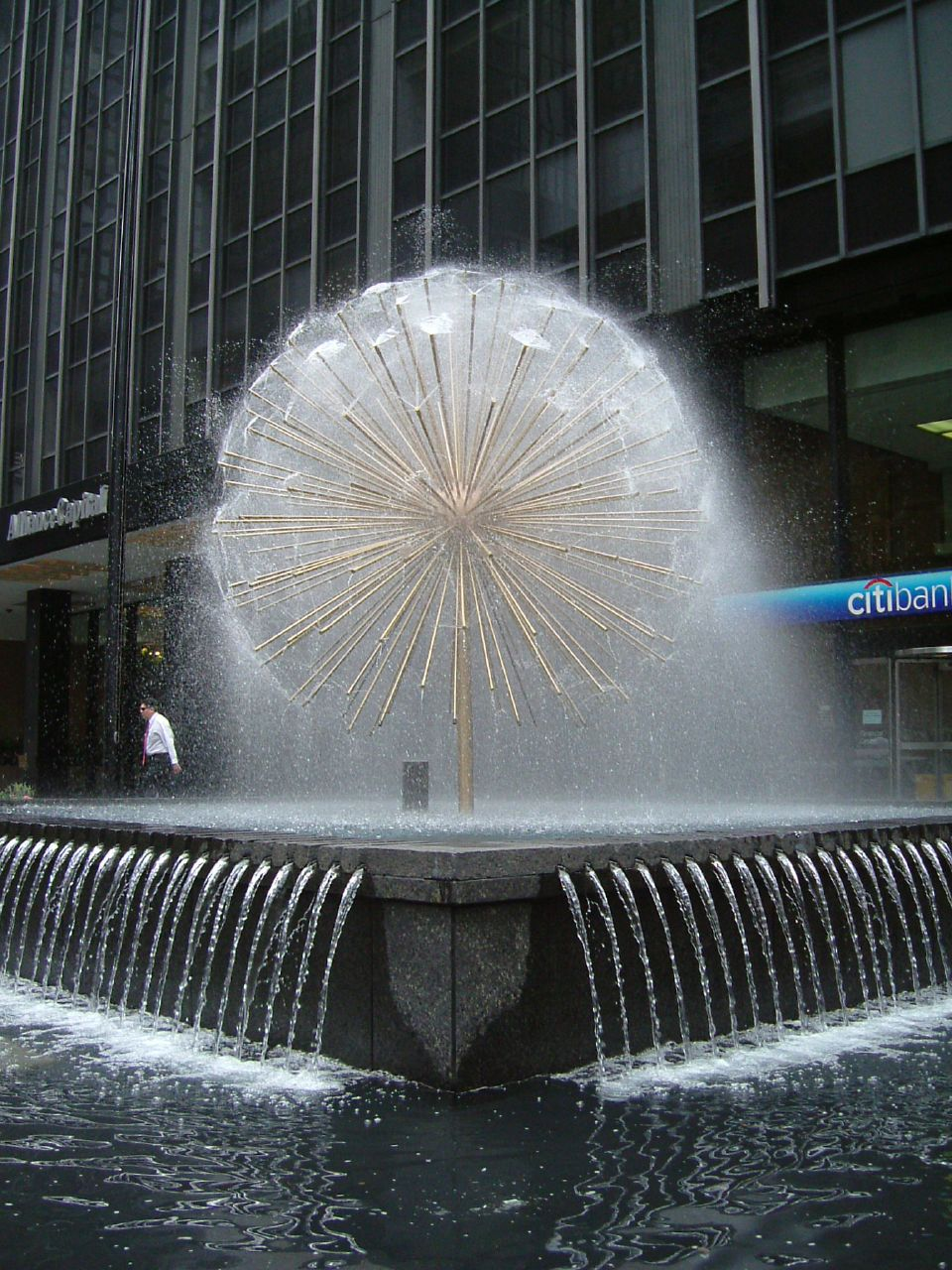
fountain (on) - June, 2014

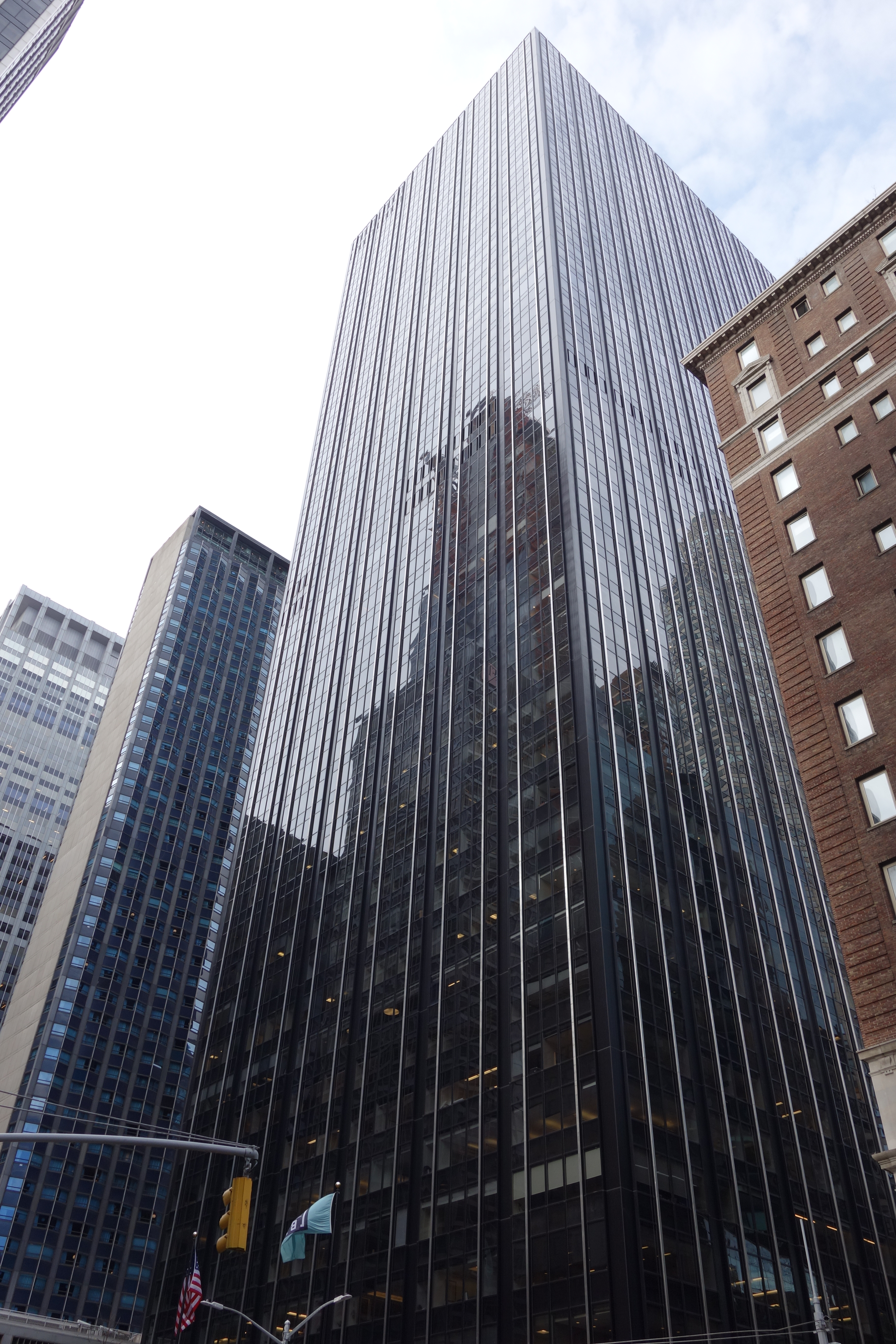
March, 2018

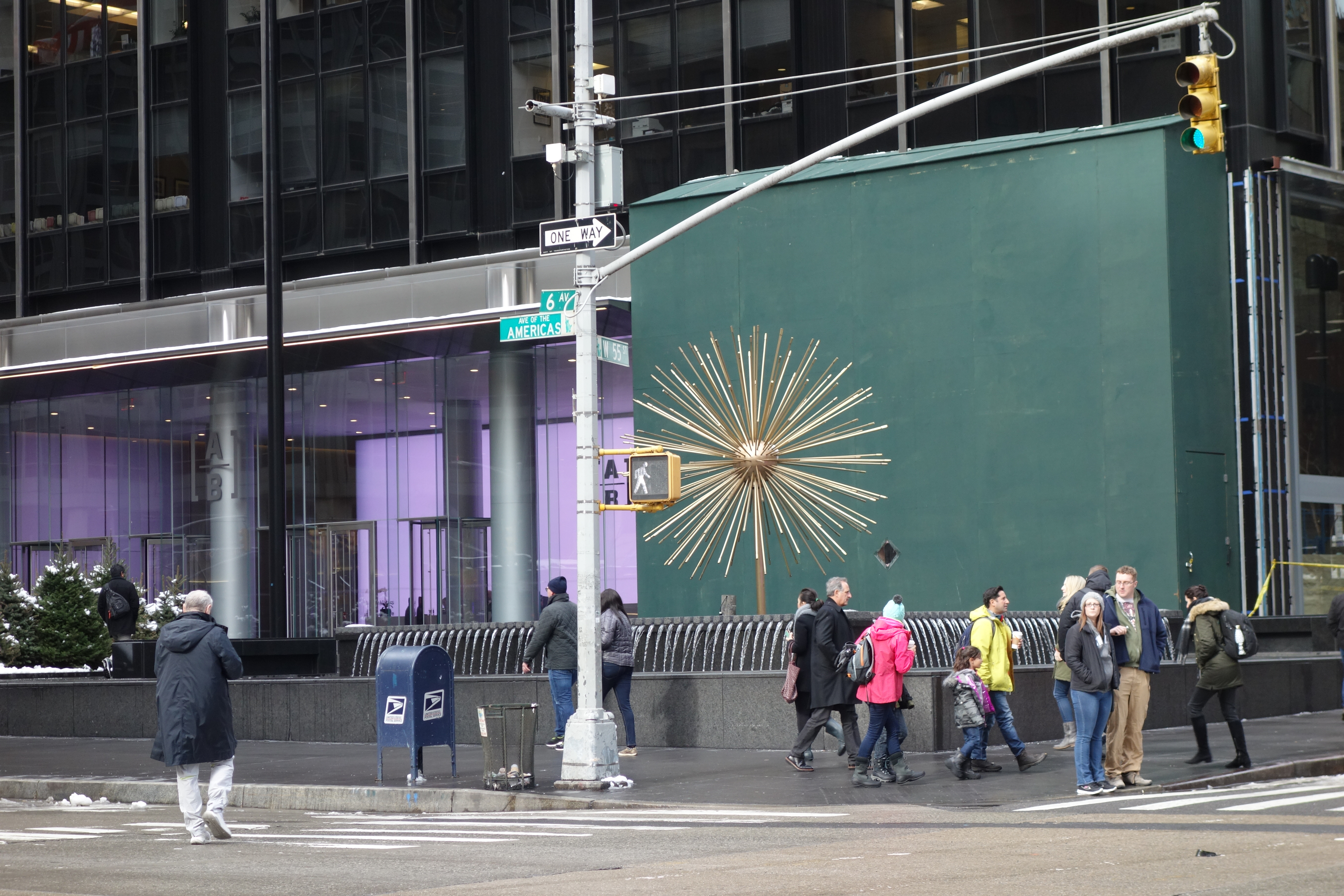
fountain (off) - March, 2018

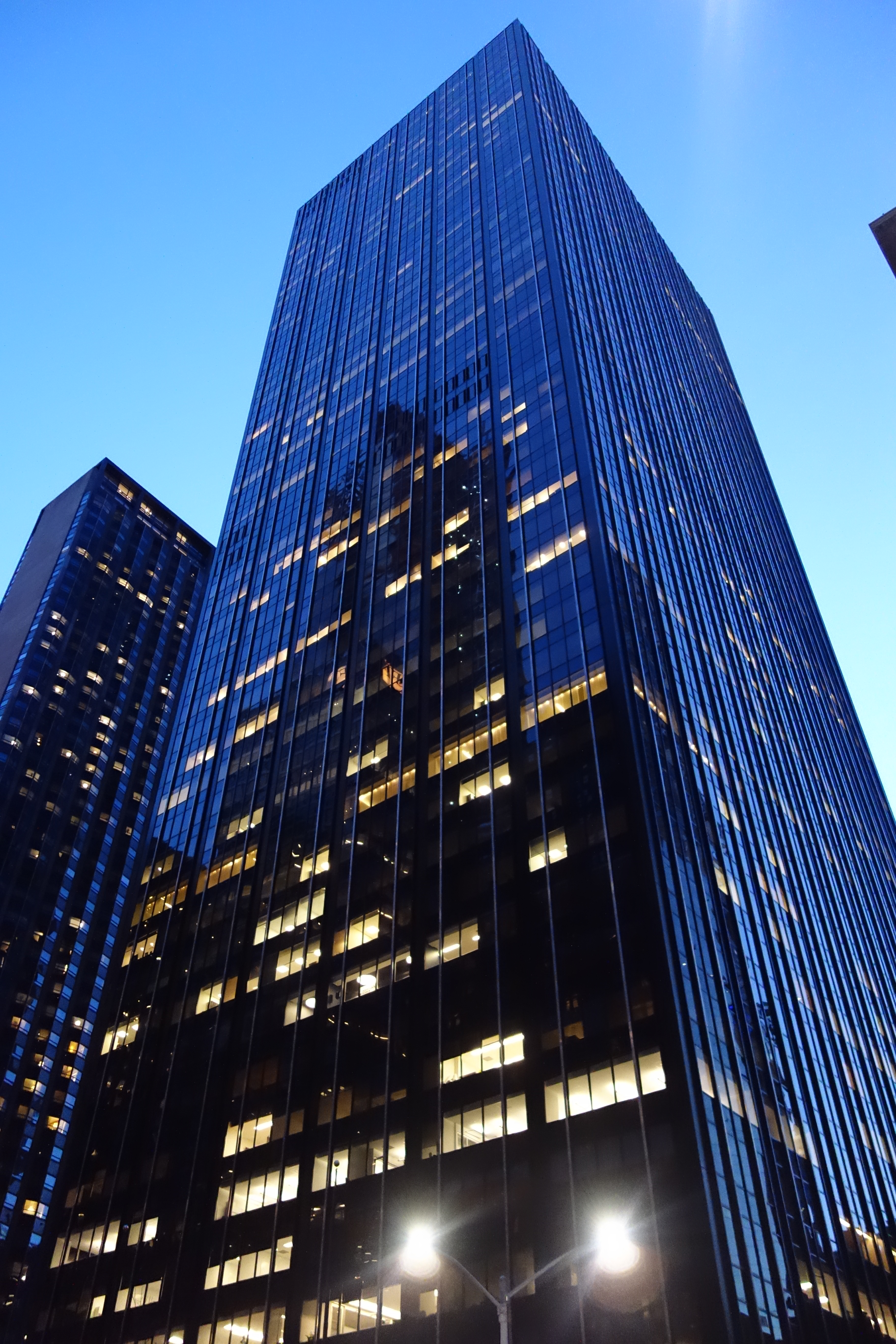
April, 2018
