= Donaldson, Lufkin & Jenrette =

American investment bank

- Type: Corporation
- Industry: Investment services
- Founded: 1959; 67 years ago
- Defunct: 2001
- Fate: Acquired
- Successor: Credit Suisse
- Headquarters: New York, New York, U.S.
- Products: Financial services Investment banking
- Number of employees: 11,300

Donaldson, Lufkin & Jenrette (DLJ) was a U.S. investment bank founded by William H. Donaldson, Richard Jenrette, and Dan Lufkin in 1959. Its businesses included securities underwriting; sales and trading; investment and merchant banking; financial advisory services; investment research; venture capital; correspondent brokerage services; online, interactive brokerage services; and asset management.

The firm was headquartered at 277 Park Avenue in New York, New York and employed about 11,300 when it was acquired in August 2000, by Credit Suisse for $11.5 billion.

== History ==
Donaldson, Lufkin and Jenrette founded the firm to pursue high quality independent corporate research. In the 1980s and 1990s, they expanded into other fields, such as high yield fixed income, or "junk bond" securities. A major factor in DLJ's underwriting and trading success could be attributed to the employees recruited from Drexel Burnham Lambert when the firm declined in the late 1980s and declared bankruptcy in 1990.

By 1997, the firm ranked first in junk-bond underwriting (up from seventh in 1990). From 1990 to 1997, it grew substantially in the stock underwriting business, rising from 20th to 4th highest volume in the United States. In 1997, DLJ ranked seventh in advising corporations in mergers and acquisitions.

Though never a powerhouse investment bank like Goldman Sachs and Morgan Stanley, DLJ generated $3.49 billion in revenues with net income of $291 million in fiscal year 1996. This performance pushed up the price of the stock of its majority owner, The Equitable.

According to Barron's, "In many ways, the Donaldson Lufkin & Jenrette saga is the classic tale of David beating Goliath." By all measures but one (junk bonds), DLJ had significantly less capital, offices and personnel than its competitors. Yet it was aggressive in acquiring new clients, doing deals and making money. DLJ was termed the "new Drexel."

Late 1990s DLJdirect logo for the firm's online brokerage business

DLJ's online brokerage business was first called the Personal Computer Financial Network (PCFN). It was renamed DLJDirect in 1997 and spun off from DLJ in 1999. Following DLJ's 2000 acquisition by Credit Suisse, DLJDirect was renamed CSFBDirect. CSFBDirect was renamed HarrisDirect after being sold to the Bank of Montreal in 2002 and was eventually re-sold to E-Trade in early 2006. The Pershing Division of DLJ (Harris) remained until being sold to the Bank of New York in 2003.

Credit Suisse's acquisition of DLJ closed in November 2000 with a purchase price of approximately $11.5 billion. Credit Suisse was using the DLJ brand for its private equity operations, including DLJ Real Estate Capital Partners, before UBS takeover. DLJ Investment Partners and DLJ Merchant Banking Partners both spun off as separate companies in 2013 and 2014 (respectively).

Both originally retained the 'DLJ' in their corporate names, with the merchant bank changing its name to aPriori Capital Partners in 2014.

== Notable alumni ==
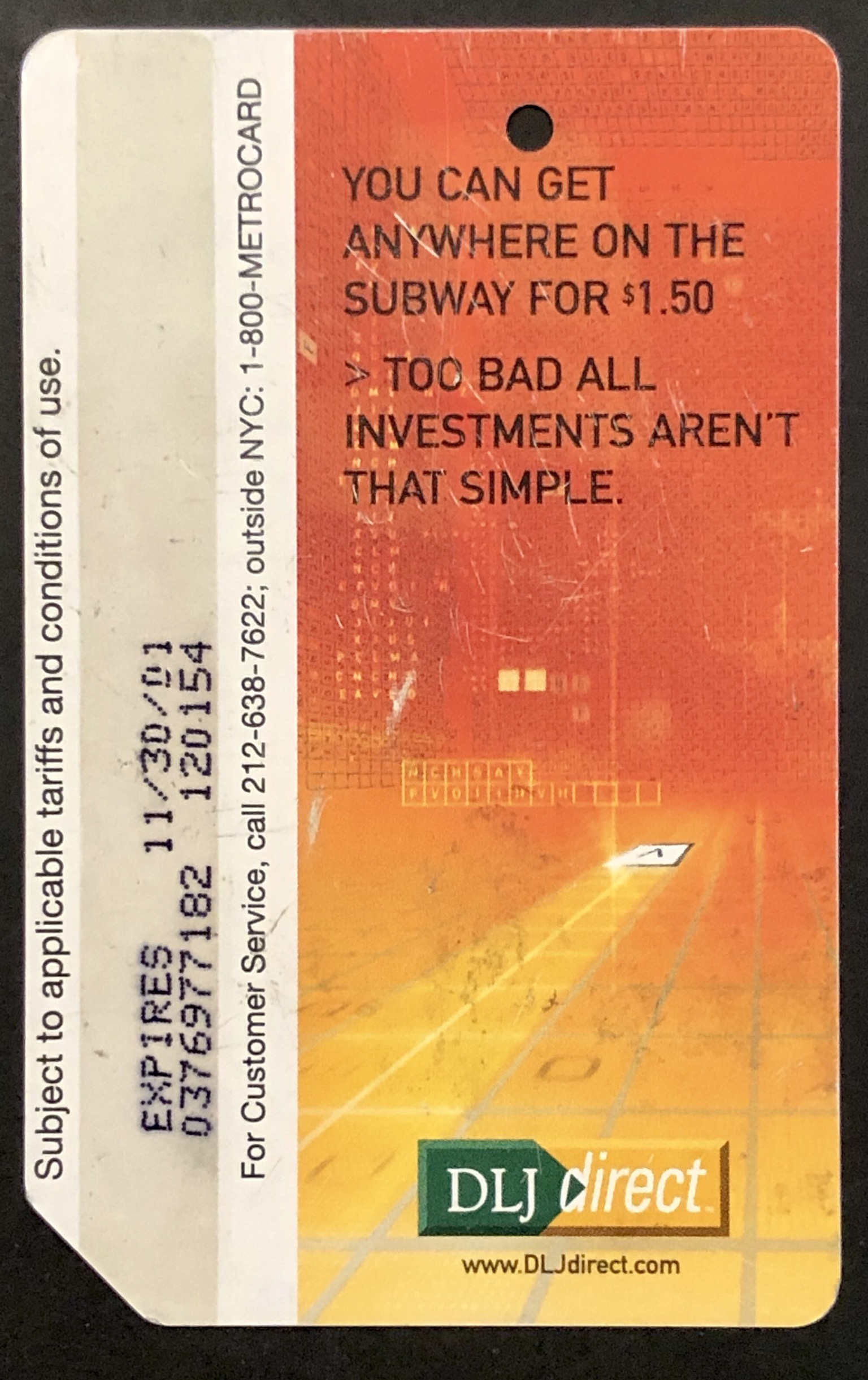
2001 NYC MetroCard with DLJ advertisement

- Barry B. Mione — CEO at SaveDay; Co-founder and Director of Investor Services at DLJdirect
- Bruce Richards — CEO & Founder at Marathon Asset Management
- Daniel Scotto
- Charles D. Harman
- David Einhorn — Founder and President of Greenlight Capital
- Douglas Kahn — Former President/CEO of Croscill Home Fashions
- Gideon Yu — President & Co-Owner of the San Francisco 49ers and former CFO of Facebook and YouTube
- Hamilton E. James — American billionaire businessman, and the executive vice chairman of The Blackstone Group
- Henry Jackson — Founder of OpCapita
- Herald Ritch — Co-founder of Sagent Advisors
- Joel J. Cohen — Co-founder of Sagent Advisors
- Jamie Dinan — Founder and Chairman of York Capital Management, LP
- James "Jimmy" Neissa — CEO/Head of North America at Rothschild & Co and former joint global head of investment banking at UBS
- Ken Moelis — Former UBS Investment Bank executive and founder of Moelis & Company
- Paul Singer — Founder and CEO of Elliott Management Corporation and The Paul E. Singer Foundation
- Robert Rahman, Founder and CEO of Rahman Financial & Company
- Navid Mahmoodzadegan — Co-Founder and Co-President of Moelis & Company
- Rich Riley — Senior Vice President & Managing Director of Yahoo! EMEA
- Safra A. Catz — CEO of Oracle Corporation
- Scott H. Aschoff — President & CEO of OCEANdrive Capital
- Stephen A. Schwarzman — Chairman and CEO of the Blackstone Group
- Susan Decker — Former president of Yahoo! Inc
- William H. Donaldson — Former chairman of the U.S. Securities and Exchange Commission (SEC)
- George Whipple III — lawyer and society reporter for NY1

== See also ==
- Credit Suisse
- Credit Suisse First Boston
- DLJ Merchant Banking Partners
