= Sagent Advisors =

Independent investment advisor

- Type: Private
- Industry: Investment banking
- Founded: 2004
- Founder: Joel Cohen; Herald "Hal" Ritch
- Defunct: 2018
- Headquarters: New York, New York, United States
- Products: Mergers & Acquisitions, Fairness opinions, Restructuring advisory
- Number of employees: 60
- Website: www.sagentadvisors.com

Sagent Advisors was an independent investment bank focused on providing financial advice on mergers & acquisitions, sales, divestitures, and private financing solutions. The firm focused on transactions in several core industry sectors, including Aerospace, Defense & Technology, Financial Institutions, Industrial, Automotive, Retail & Consumer and Technology, Media and Telecommunications. The firm also had an active private equity financial sponsor coverage business and a Japan/Asia Focus Group, which provided Cross-border M&A transactions between Japan as well as other Asian countries and North America, formed when Sagent Advisors entered into a business alliance with Daiwa Securities. Sagent Advisors was acquired by Daiwa Securities Group in 2018.

== Services ==
=== Mergers and acquisitions ===
Sagent provided buy-side advisory services, sell-side advisory services, defense advisory services and corporate transactions and reorganizations.

=== Private financing solutions ===
Sagent's private financing solutions group provided customized financing solutions to privately held businesses, public companies and alternative investment firms, focusing on the following products: Equity & Equity Linked Securities, Structured Equity Securities, Mezzanine Debt Securities, Project Financing, PIPE Transactions, Synthetic Securities, Use of Proceeds- Contingent Acquisition and Bridge Financings, Corporate Spin-Outs, Growth financings, Recapitalizations, and Management Buyouts.

=== Japan/Asia Focus Group ===
Sagent's Japan/Asia Focus Group specializes in cross-border M&A transactions between Japan as well as other Asian countries and North America. The group was formed when Sagent Advisors entered into a business alliance with Daiwa Securities, the second largest securities firm in Japan and a principal provider of financial services to many of Japan's major corporations.

== Industries ==
Sagent's bankers focus on the following industries: Aerospace, Defense Technology, Government Services; Financial Institutions; Financial Sponsors Coverage; Industrial: Automotive, Building Products & Construction, Capital Goods & Multi-Industry, Distribution, Metals & Mining, Oil & Gas, Paper, Plastics & Packaging, Transportation & Logistics; Technology, Media and Telecommunications: Financial Technology, IT Services & Outsourcing, Media & Information Practice, Telecommunications.

== Early history ==
Sagent was founded by Herald "Hal" Ritch and Joel Cohen, former co-heads of global mergers and acquisitions for Donaldson, Lufkin & Jenrette. In March 2009, co-founder, Joel Cohen, retired from the firm. In 2007, Sagent sold a 20% minority stake in the firm to Daiwa Securities, a Japanese financial institution. In December 2013, Sagent Advisors and igc partners formed an alliance to deliver cross-border M&A advisory services in the US and Brazil.

The firm, which was based at 299 Park Avenue in New York, was founded in 2004. In April 2009, Sagent opened additional domestic offices in Charlotte, San Francisco and Chicago, recruiting several industry-focused teams from leading investment banks. The firm has since closed its San Francisco office and downsized its Charlotte office to Tysons Corner, VA.
