= 299 Park Avenue =

Skyscraper in Manhattan, New York

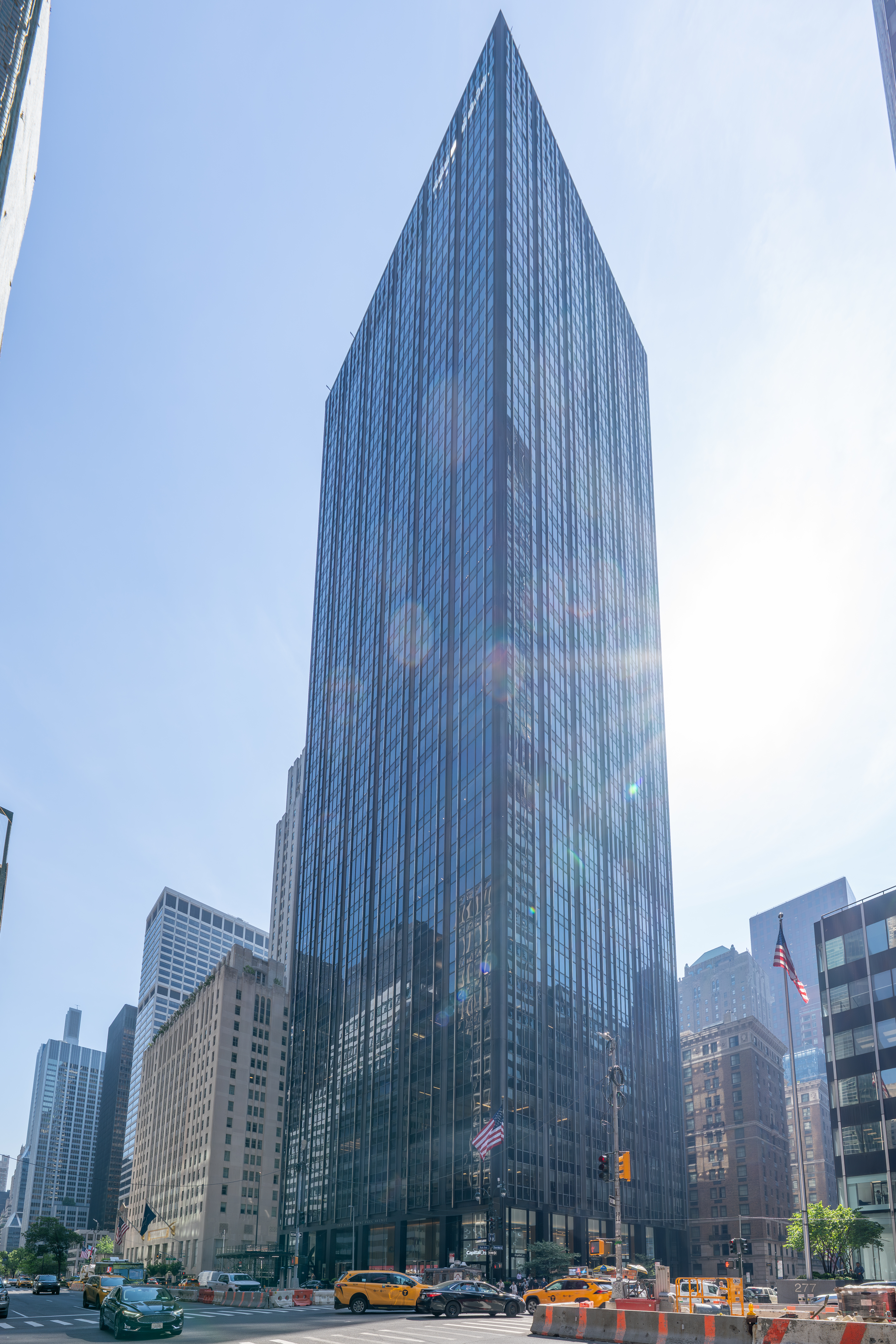
- Interactive map of the 299 Park Avenue area

General information
- Status: Completed
- Type: Commercial/Office
- Location: 299 Park Avenue; Manhattan, NY 10171; U.S.
- Coordinates: 40.756173°N 73.974493°W
- Construction started: 1965
- Opening: 1967
- Owner: Fisher Brothers (50.5%); Rockpoint Group (49.5%)

Height
- Roof: 574 ft (175 m)
- Top floor: 537 ft (163.6 m)

Technical details
- Floor count: 42

Design and construction
- Architect: Emery Roth & Sons
- Developer: Fisher Brothers

299 Park Avenue is an office building on Park Avenue between 48th and 49th streets in the Midtown neighborhood of Manhattan in New York City.

== History ==
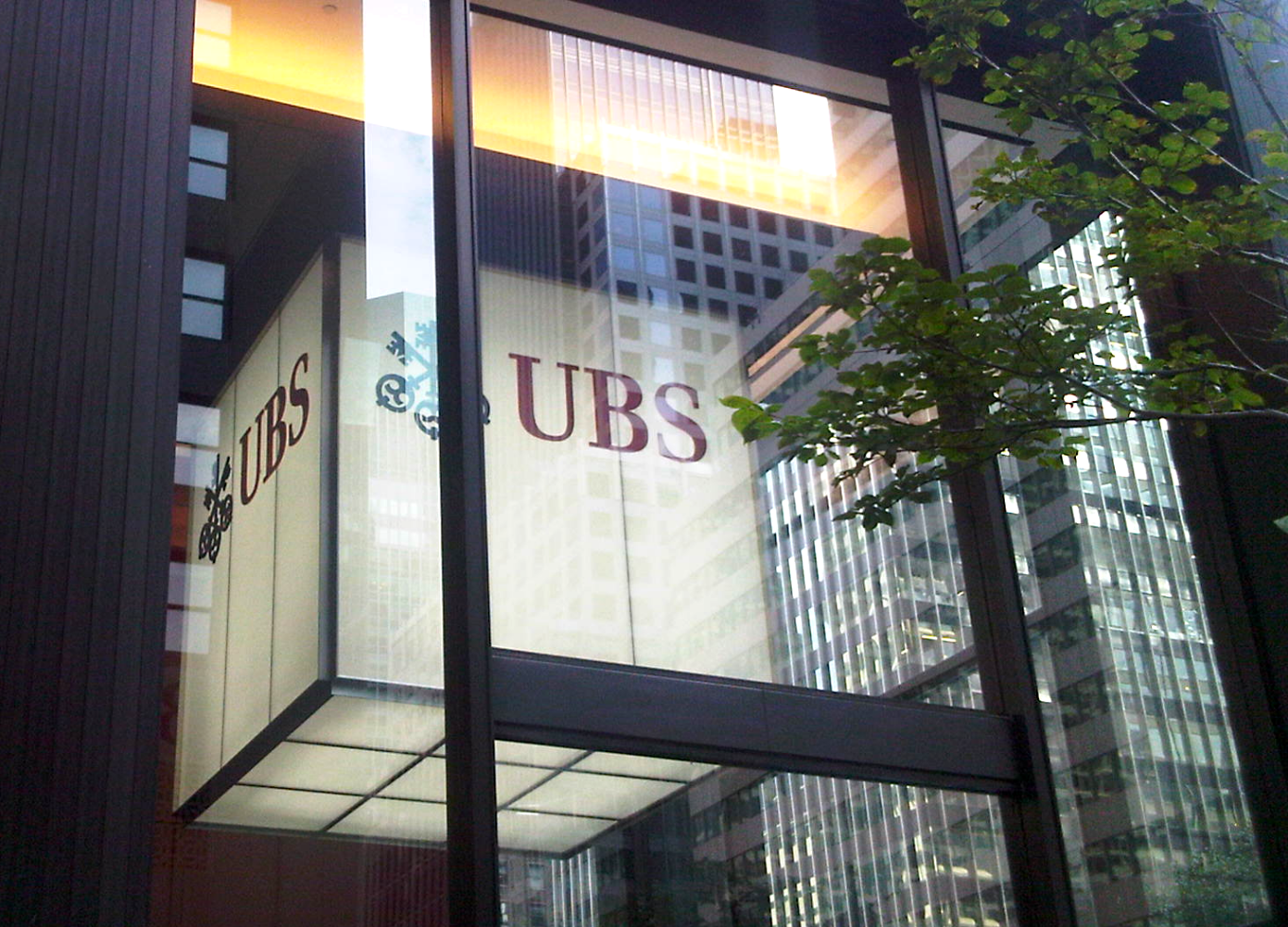
Entrance to UBS Investment Bank's New York offices at 299 Park Avenue

Designed in the International Style by Emery Roth & Sons, the building was opened in 1967. It has 42 stories and is approximately 175 m (574 ft) tall. 299 Park is a black skyscraper with alternating shiny and matte thin stainless steel mullions emphasizing its height. The building contains approximately 1.2 million square feet (110,000 m^{2}) of space. The building is assigned its own ZIP Code, 10171; it was one of 41 buildings in Manhattan that had their own ZIP Codes as of 2019.

The site on the east side of Park Avenue, between 48th and 49th Street, was formerly occupied by the original Park Lane Hotel. The building was originally constructed over the primary rail tracks for the New York Central Railroad's Park Avenue main line, which made the building's construction and engineering highly complicated. The foundation of the building was constructed through "ladder tracks", two layers of railroad tracks, not in platform position. The construction was completed without interfering with the operation of the railroad. In 1980 and then again in 1981, the building suffered damage from large fires—the 1980 fire caused injuries to 125 firefighters.

For much of its history, the building was commonly referred to as the Westvaco Building and was the headquarters of Westvaco. Westvaco's paper mills are part of Smurfit Westrock. The building was also the home of law firm Debevoise, Plimpton, Lyons & Gates prior to leaving the building in 1983.

Since its construction, 299 Park has majority owned and controlled by Fisher Brothers, a real estate investment group, that developed the site in the 1960s. Fisher Brothers occupies the top two floors of the building for its headquarters. Before the 2008 financial crisis, UBS owned a 49.5% interest in the building. The bank began an auction for its minority interest in the building in 2009 and sold its interest for $335 million in early 2010, implying a total valuation of just over $675 million. The buyer was Rockpoint Investments, a real estate investment firm. UBS also sublet a portion of its space in the building in 2009. The building was refinanced in 2025 with a $500 million mortgage loan.

== Tenants ==
- American Securities
- B. Riley FBR, Inc.
- Capital One
- Carlyle Group
- Cerberus Capital Management
- Crescent Capital Group
- FBR Capital Markets
- Freeman Spogli & Co.
- GE Capital
- Gener8 Maritime
- Leerink Partners
- Lightstone Group
- Lincoln International
- Sagent Advisors
- UBS Wealth Management
- Traxys North America
- Consulate General of Japan in New York
