= Kent Karosen =

American businessman and author

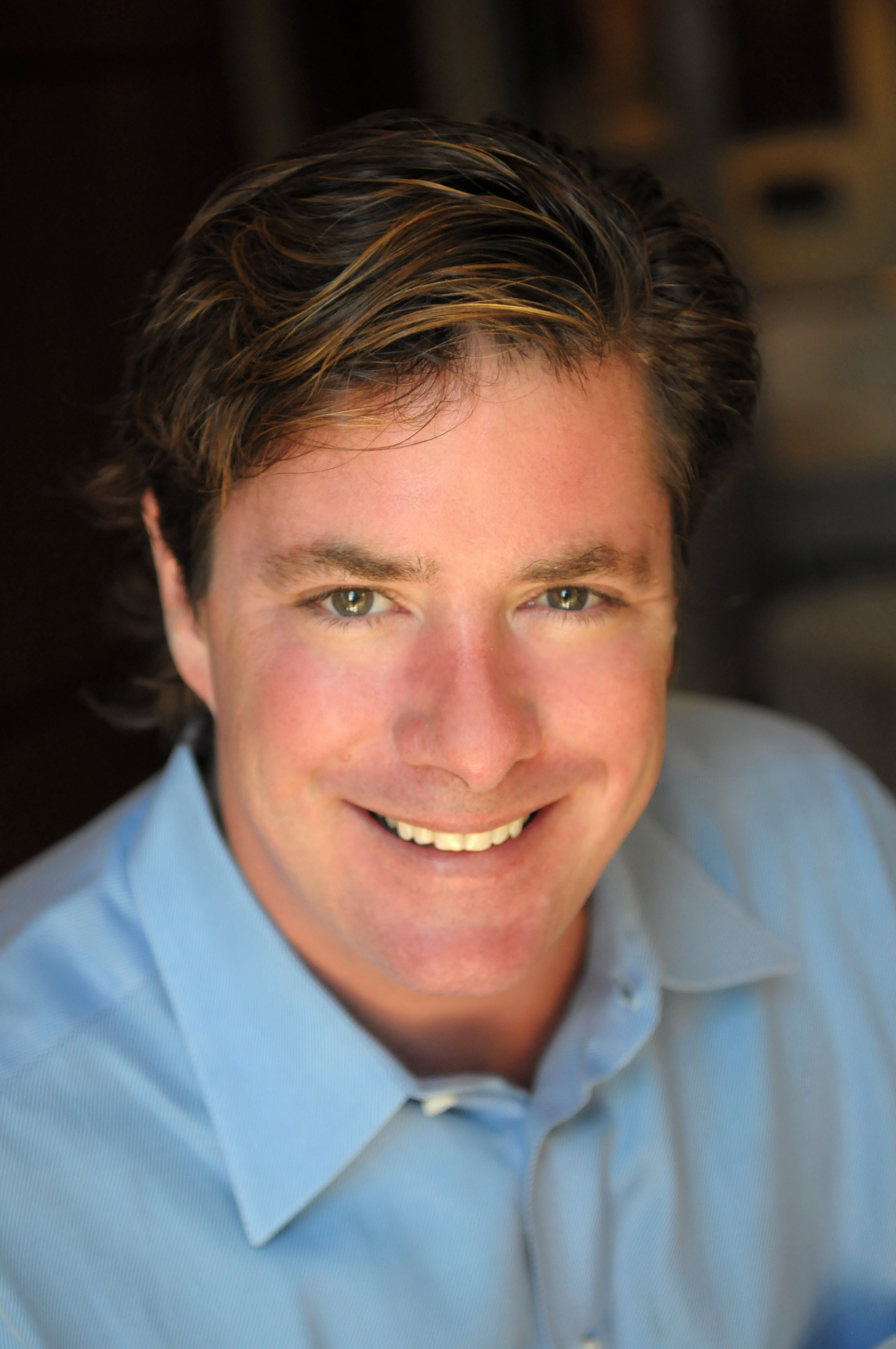
- Kent Karosen
- Born: Kent Lawrence Karosen; January 23, 1965; Kansas City, Missouri, U.S.
- Died: December 6, 2018 (aged 53); Miami Beach, Florida, U.S.
- Education: Kenyon College (BA)
- Occupations: Former President and CEO, Fisher Center for Alzheimer's Research Foundation
- Spouse: Brian Hauserman (m. 2008)

Kent L. Karosen (January 23, 1965 – December 6, 2018) was an American businessman, author and philanthropist who served on the board of several charitable organizations. He was the president and CEO of the Fisher Center for Alzheimer's Research Foundation, a nonprofit health organization.

== Career ==
After graduating from Kenyon College with a Bachelor of Arts in History and extensive study in economics, Karosen went on to become a commercial real estate developer in Kansas City, Missouri. In 1991, Karosen joined Cantor Fitzgerald, the Manhattan securities firm, where he developed the Securities Lending Desk and then became partner and managing director. In 1992, he founded the Intrepid Sea, Air and Space Museum's "Museum Society," where he created the Salute to Freedom Award and dinner, a tradition that has raised over $20 million for the museum. The award has honored leaders such as presidents Reagan, Bush and Clinton; Prime Ministers Thatcher and Rabin and Secretaries Cohen and Powell.

Cantor Fitzgerald's offices, located on floors 101 to 105 of 1 World Trade Center, were destroyed by the terrorist attacks of September 11, 2001, killing 658 of the company's 960 New York employees. On October 1, 2001, Karosen organized a memorial service in New York's Central Park for over 4,000 family members and friends of those killed. He continued to put together an annual celebration of life event for the families of Cantor Fitzgerald's victims on the anniversary of the attacks up until his death.

Karosen's skills and efforts proved critical to Cantor Fitzgerald's recovery after the September 11 attacks destroyed the firm's headquarters in the World Trade Center. The day after the tragedy, he organized and managed the Crisis Center to aid the 658 families of the victims of the 9/11 attacks and continued to organize Cantor's annual memorial service in honor of his fallen colleagues. In May 2001, Karosen was named an Honorary Commodore in the United States Coast Guard Auxiliary for the 1st Southern Region. Additionally, he was a member of the board of trustees of the Michael Stern Parkinson's Foundation and served as the chairman of its investment committee. Karosen headed the team to secure temporary headquarters for Cantor Fitzgerald and directed the search for their permanent headquarters. He was instrumental in the lease negotiations for Cantor Fitzgerald's 190,000 sq. ft. new headquarters as well as Cantor's public incentives to rebuild in New York City. Concurrently, Karosen was a principal in securing for Cantor Fitzgerald and other firms directly affected by the 9/11 attacks over $30 million in federal, state and city aid to rebuild.

In the fall of 2016, Karosen wrote, with children's book author Chana Stiefel, "Why Can't Grandma Remember My Name?", which juxtaposes paintings and drawings created by children with those created by Alzheimer's patients. It tackles a child's questions such as "How can I have fun with Grandma?" and "Will Grandma get worse?" and offers advice for families coping with the illness, with royalties benefiting the foundation.

In 2006, Honorable Scott Stringer appointed Karosen as his representative to the Times Square Alliance board. Karosen was also a board member for the New York City Fund for Public Advocacy, Midwest Chapter of the Leukemia Society, United States Coast Guard Foundation and the Wilbraham Monson Academy. He was a member of the boards of the Intrepid Sea, Air, & Space Museum Foundation and the Fisher Center for Alzheimer's Research Foundation, where he served as president and CEO beginning in 2009. He served on the board of directors for Temple Emanu-El Synagogue in Miami Beach, Florida.

== Personal life ==
Kent Lawrence Karosen was born in Kansas City, Missouri, to Mary Vivian and Leon Karosen, who lived in Mission Hills, Kansas. His father, Leon, was an owner of the Kansas City Kings, the National Basketball Association team, and Youthcraft Coats and Suits, Inc.

In 2008, Karosen married Brian Byrl Hauserman in Provincetown, Massachusetts and again in a religious ceremony in New York City, NY. Hauserman was a residential broker at Prudential Douglas Elliman in Manhattan. Together, they managed the business consulting firm, Karosen Strategic Partners, LLC where Karosen served as president. They relocated to Miami Beach, Florida where Karosen became active in the Jewish community. He served on the board of directors for the Temple Emanu-El Synagogue.

Karosen died at Mount Sinai Medical Center in Miami Beach, Florida on Thursday, December 6, 2018, at the age of 53.

Brian Hauserman died on September 16, 2019.
