= Zachary Fisher =

American businessman and philanthropist (1910–1999)

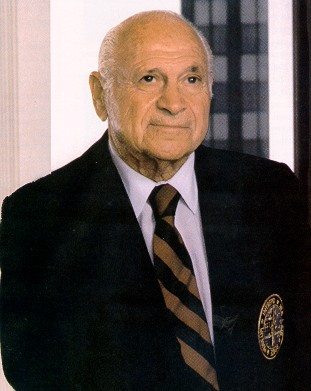
- Born: September 26, 1910; Brooklyn, New York City, U.S.
- Died: June 4, 1999 (aged 88); New York City, U.S.
- Occupations: Investor, Philanthropist
- Spouse: Elizabeth Kenowsky
- Children: William Crovello (stepson)
- Family: Martin Fisher (brother); Larry Fisher (brother)

Zachary Fisher (September 26, 1910 – June 4, 1999) was an American philanthropist and businessman. Born in the Brooklyn area, Fisher began his involvement with construction in his teen years. He then played a role in the New York real estate community for years while also serving as a major philanthropic benefactor for the men and women in the United States Armed Forces and their families, as well as being involved with numerous other not-for-profit organizations. President Bill Clinton awarded Fisher the Presidential Medal of Freedom in 1998.

Fisher founded the Fisher House Foundation, which builds "homes of comfort" at or near military and Veterans Administration hospitals. These Fisher Houses provide free temporary lodging to the families of veterans and service members who are receiving medical care. He also founded the Fisher Center for Alzheimer's Research Foundation.

== Early life and real estate career ==
Born to a Jewish family in Brooklyn, New York, the son of a bricklayer immigrant from Russia who taught his sons masonry. Fisher began working in construction at the age of 16. In 1915, he and his brothers, Martin and Larry, founded Fisher Brothers, first working as contractors building homes outside Manhattan. which grew into one of the real estate industry's largest residential and commercial developers, owning more than five million square feet of office space.

== Philanthropy ==
=== Dedication to U.S. Armed Forces ===
From the earliest days of his construction career, Fisher was a strong supporter of the U.S. Armed Forces. Prevented from active service in World War II due to a leg injury, Fisher drew on his building skills to assist the U.S. Coastal Service in the construction of coastal fortifications. His patronage of the Armed Forces became an ongoing concern from that time, evolving to occupy increasing amounts of his energies.

In the 1970s, while remaining active in Fisher Brothers, Fisher's commitment to both the Armed Forces and other philanthropic causes intensified still further through his leadership role in a number of major projects. In 1982, Fisher established the Zachary and Elizabeth M. Fisher Armed Services Foundation. Through the Foundation, he made significant contributions to the families of the victims of the bombing of the Marine barracks in Beirut in 1983. Since then, the Foundation has made contributions of $25,000 to numerous military families who have lost loved ones under tragic circumstances.

=== Fisher House Foundation ===
In 1990, Fisher and his wife, Elizabeth, founded the Fisher House Foundation, after Pauline Trost, wife of Chief of Naval Operations Admiral Carlisle Trost, presented to Zachary and Elizabeth Fisher the need for temporary lodging facilities for families at major military medical centers. The Fishers personally dedicated more than $20 million to the construction of comfort homes for families of hospitalized military personnel.

More than 91 Fisher Houses now operate at military bases and Department of Veterans Affairs medical centers throughout the nation and in Germany and the United Kingdom. More than 8 million days of lodging have been provided by Fisher Houses since its inception, saving families an estimated $400 million since it began in 1991 . Since the program's inception, more than 335,000 families have stayed in Fisher Houses. These temporary living facilities served as "homes away from home" for families of military personnel who were undergoing treatment at military or VA hospitals.

=== Other ===
In 1994, Fisher, in partnership with David Rockefeller, established the Fisher Center for Alzheimer's Research Foundation, which funds Alzheimer's disease research with the goal of finding a cause and cure. The Foundation operates the nation's largest and most modern Alzheimer's research laboratory, housed at The Rockefeller University in New York City.

Fisher also supported the families of New York City firefighters who lost their lives in the line of duty. Throughout his life, Fisher held a number of posts on a variety of charitable and arts organizations and military charities throughout the country. He served as Honorary Chairman of the Board of Directors of the Marine Corps – Law Enforcement Foundation and was a supporter of the Coast Guard Foundation, the Navy League and other military charities. Fisher also established the annual Chairman of the Joint Chiefs of Staff Award for Excellence in Military Medicine.

He was a major supporter of the Metropolitan Opera, Temple Israel, the Jewish Institute of National Security Affairs, the George C. Marshall Foundation, the Margaret Thatcher Foundation, the Reagan Presidential Library, the United Jewish Appeal and many other organizations. Fisher also served on the boards of Carnegie Hall and several other institutions and received honorary doctorate degrees from the Massachusetts Maritime Academy and the Uniformed Services University of Health Sciences.

== Honors ==
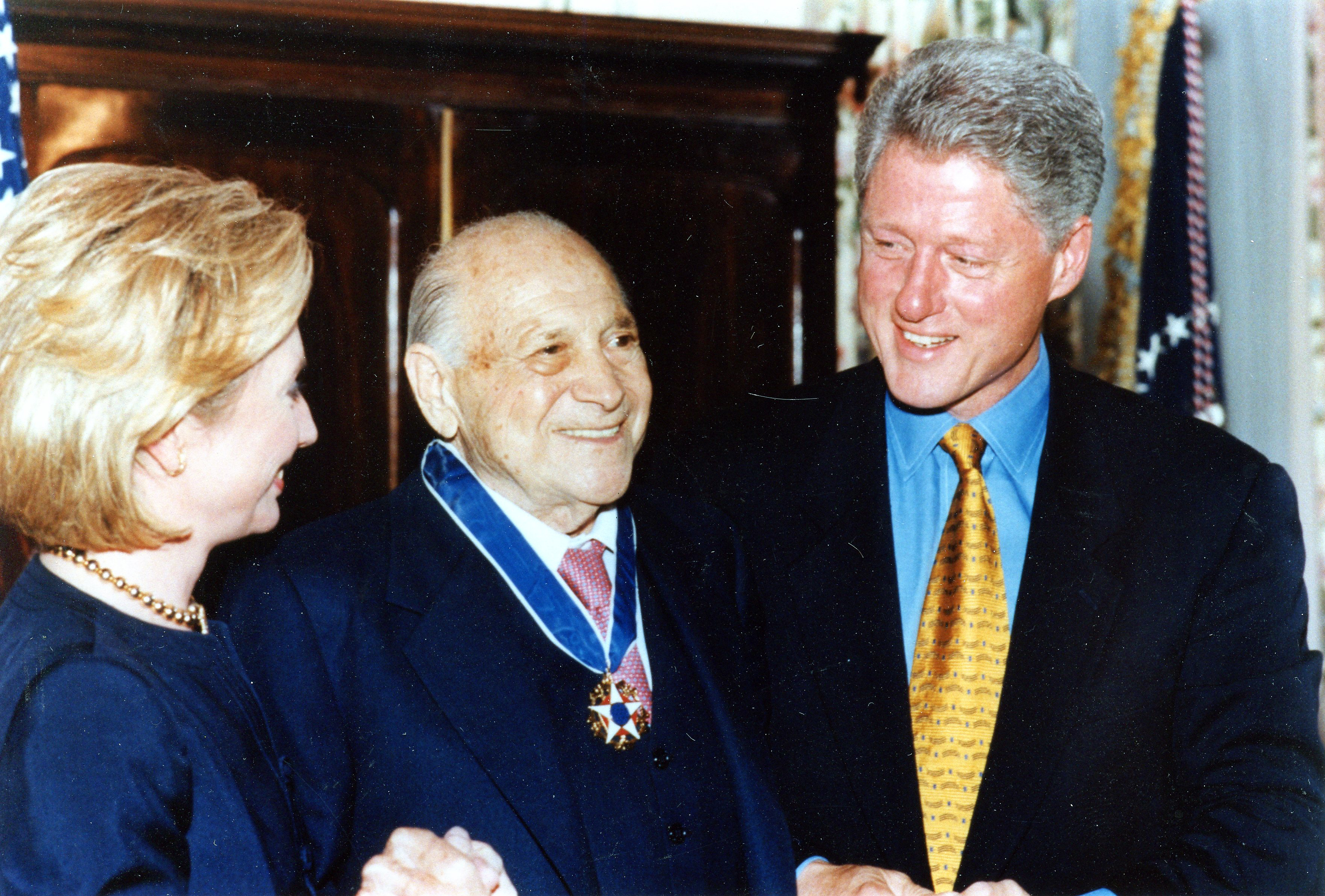
Fisher receiving the Medal of Freedom

In April 1995, Fisher was presented with the Presidential Citizens Medal by President Bill Clinton. In 1997, Fisher and his wife were given the Naval Heritage Award from the U.S. Navy Memorial Foundation for their efforts on the development of Fisher House. In 1998, Fisher received the Presidential Medal of Freedom from President Clinton in honor of his wide-ranging contributions on behalf of the young men and women in the U.S. Armed Forces. He also received the Horatio Alger Award, the Volunteer Action Award, the Senior Civilian Award from the Chairman of the Joint Chiefs of Staff and the Secretary of Defense, as well as the top awards a civilian can receive from each branch of the military.

In 1999, the United States Senate introduced a bill that would confer upon Fisher the status of honorary veteran of the Armed Forces. Fisher had attempted to enlist in the military during World War II, but was disqualified due to a preexisting medical condition. The bill, Public Law 106-161, was signed on December 9, 1999. Only Bob Hope shares the status of honorary veteran of the Armed Forces.

Separately, Presidents Gerald Ford, Jimmy Carter, Ronald Reagan, George H. W. Bush and Bill Clinton, as well as Margaret Thatcher and the late Yitzak Rabin, recognized Fisher for his support of charitable organizations throughout the United States.

In 1997 the Bob Hope-class roll on roll off vehicle cargo ship USNS Fisher (T-AKR-301) was named for him and his wife.

On 10 March 1996, Zachary Fisher was recognized as the 1996 American College of Healthcare Executives Honorary Fellow at the ACHE's Convocation Ceremony. Honorary Fellowship is a special category of ACHE membership. It is awarded to distinguished leaders who have had a beneficial influence on the profession of health services management and/or some aspect of public health, but are not eligible to join the College.

In 1993, Fisher received the Golden Plate Award of the American Academy of Achievement.

== Personal life ==
Fisher was married to former USO dancer Elizabeth Kenowsky (died 2004) for 54 years. He had one stepson, William Crovello.

== Sources ==
- Military Sealift Command
