= Manny Alvarez =

Cuban-American obstetrician-gynecologist

- Born: Manuel Alvarez; Cuba
- Occupations: Obstetrician-gynecologist; television commentator
- Employer: Hackensack University Medical Center
- Spouse: Katarina Alvarez
- Website: www.askdrmanny.com

Manuel Alvarez (born c. 1957) is a Cuban-American obstetrician-gynecologist who has appeared on Fox News shows such as America's Newsroom, Fox & Friends, Happening Now, Varney & Co., Money with Melissa, The O'Reilly Factor, The Kelly File, and Fox News Weekend, as well as on the local affiliate, WNYW-Fox 5 News. He is chairman of the department of obstetrics/gynecology at Hackensack University Medical Center in Hackensack, New Jersey, and runs AskDrManny.com out of its headquarters in Hoboken, New Jersey. Alvarez is an opponent of the Patient Protection and Affordable Care Act, insisting it will lead to "socialized medicine" and "the end of private practice".

== Personal life ==
Alvarez was separated from his family as a young boy during the Cuban Revolution when he was sent to the United States to live with a foster family through an outreach program while his father was placed in a Cuban prison. Five years later, Alvarez was reunited with his family in New York. His father started a business in Hoboken, New Jersey.

Alvarez lives in a New Jersey suburb with his wife and three children. His son Ryan is on the autism spectrum and Alvarez has been a vocal supporter of the autism community, often using his position at Fox News to speak out on social issues affecting people on the spectrum. His son Orexus graduated from St. John’s University in Queens, NY.

== Medical career ==
Alvarez graduated in 1981 from the Department of Medicine of Universidad Central del Este a private university in the Dominican Republic, founded in San Pedro de Macorís on October 15, 1970.

Alvarez sits on the board of the Fisher Center for Alzheimer's Research Foundation which supports patient information and research grants to scientists in an effort to find a cure for Alzheimer's disease. Howard Lutnick, chairman and chief executive officer of Cantor Fitzgerald, L.P., is also a board member.

In June 2006, Alvarez was honored by Hillary Clinton during the 20th anniversary of Postpartum Support International for his work in providing lectures and community education on women's health. He is a member of the organization's President's Advisory Council.

== Journalism career ==
In September 2005, Alvarez filed a report for Fox News from Texas on the preparations that were being made ahead of Hurricane Rita to prevent mistakes made after Hurricane Katrina.

Alvarez launched AskDrManny in January 2006 as a website dedicated to providing general information about health news. The website specializes in information regarding Women's Health, Pregnancy, and Early Childhood Development. In 2009 AskDrManny launched a YouTube channel aimed at providing video segments related to the same topics.

Alvarez reported on the earthquake that hit Haiti in January 2010, where he brought medical supplies and helped treat patients at border hospitals in the Dominican Republic.

Later on that year, in June 2010, he reported on the BP oil spill in the Gulf of Mexico, coining the phrase "Gulf Oil Syndrome" in referring to the potential health hazards that the population in the region could face in the years to come.

Alvarez has interviewed the Nobel laureate Paul Greengard about his discoveries in treating Alzheimer's disease and receiving The Karolinska Institute's Bi-Centennial Gold Medal.

Alvarez is the author of The Checklist: What You and Your Family Need to Know to Prevent Disease and Live a Long and Healthy Life, which won two awards in May 2008 for both its Spanish and English editions at the 10th annual International Latino Book Awards in Los Angeles. In 2008, he published his second book, The Hot Latin Diet: The Fast-Track Plan to a Bombshell Body.

He serves as the senior managing health editor for FoxNews.com, Fox News Channel, Fox Business Network, and FoxBusiness.com.

== Publications ==
- The Checklist: What You and Your Family Need to Know to Prevent Disease and Live a Long and Healthy Life. New York: Rayo. 2007. ISBN 978-0-06-118878-7.
- The Hot Latin Diet: The Fast-Track Plan to a Bombshell Body. New York: Celebra Books. 2008. ISBN 978-0-451-22371-5.
