= Lincoln International =

Multinational financial services company

Lincoln International, Inc.

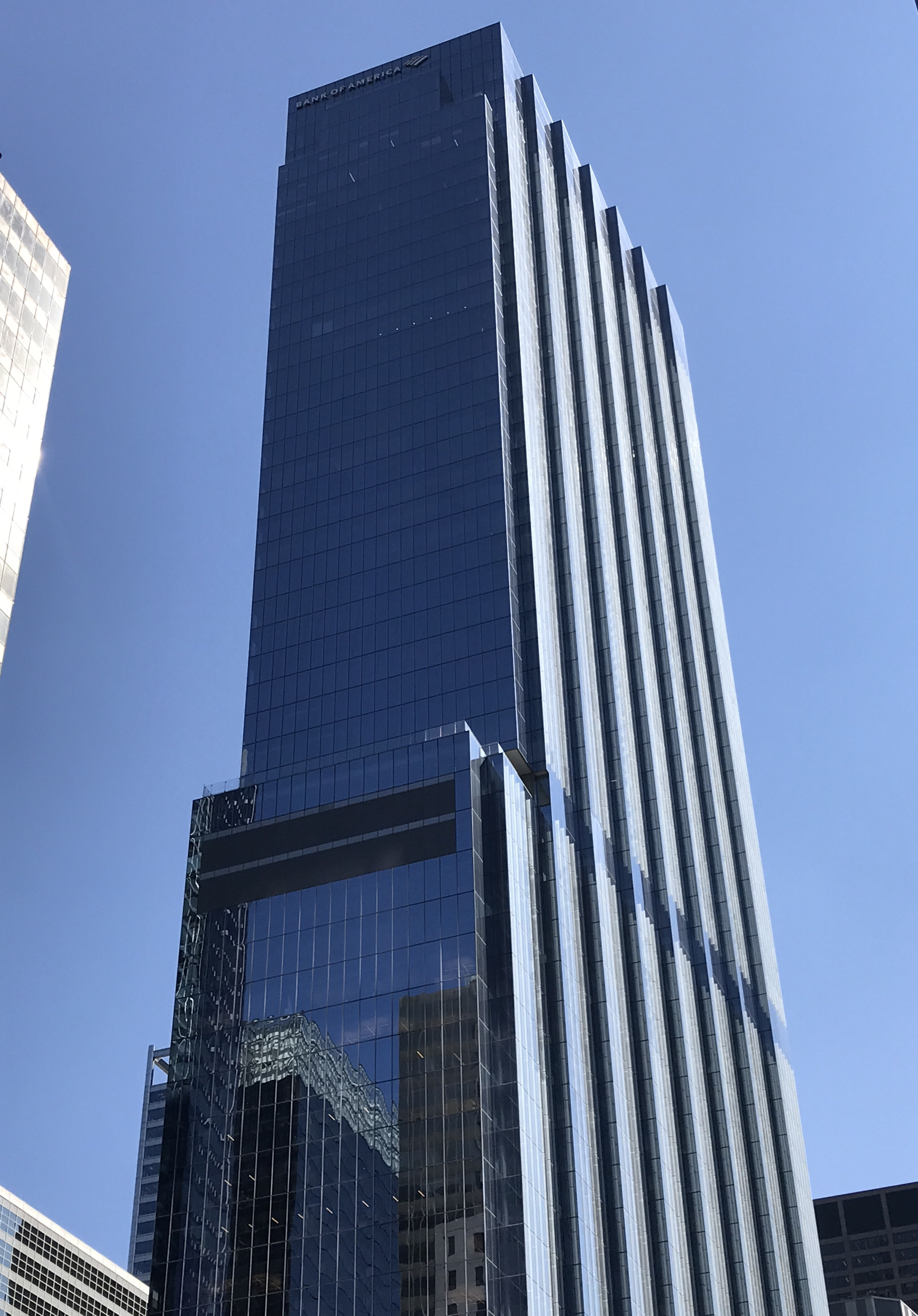
- Headquarters at 110 North Wacker
- Type: Public
- Traded as: NYSE: LCLN
- Industry: Investment banking
- Predecessor: Lincoln Partners; Peters Associates
- Founded: 1996
- Founder: Robert B. Barr, Jim Lawson
- Headquarters: Chicago, Illinois, United States
- Products: Mergers and acquisitions, fairness opinions, capital advisory, joint ventures & partnering
- Number of employees: 1,453
- Website: www.lincolninternational.com

Lincoln International, Inc. is a multinational independent investment bank and financial services company specializing in advisory services and financings on middle market transactions. The firm works with publicly traded and privately owned companies, financial sponsors (private equity, venture capital, family offices, and hedge funds), and lenders. The firm provides advisory services including mergers and acquisitions, capital advisory consisting of growth equity, debt, and restructuring advisory, valuations and opinions, private funds advisory and joint ventures & partnering. The firm completed more than 400 advisory assignments globally in 2021, as well as over 10,000 debt and equity valuations.

The firm, which is headquartered in Chicago, Illinois, was founded in 1996. As of January 2026, it has over 1,400 employees. The company operates through 25+ offices in North America (Atlanta, Chicago, Dallas, Los Angeles, Miami, New York, San Francisco, Cleveland and Richmond), Europe (Amsterdam, Brussels, Frankfurt, London, Madrid, Milan, Munich, Paris, Stockholm, Vienna and Zurich), Asia (Beijing, Mumbai, Bangalore and Tokyo), South America (São Paulo), and the Middle East (Dubai).

Since April 2023, the firm also increased its geographic reach into Oceania through a strategic partnership with Miles Advisory Partners, which has offices in Sydney and Melbourne. The Indian office is running its operations in Mumbai.

== History ==
The firm was founded by Rob Barr and Jim Lawson, as well as Ed Hanlon and Eric Malchow, as a boutique investment banking firm, Lincoln Partners, in 1996. Barr and Lawson had worked together since 1981 and they began to work with Hanlon in 1988 and Malchow in 1994. Prior to founding Lincoln Partners, the partners spent most of their time working for Paine Webber, which was acquired by UBS in 2000.

Through the late 1990s, Lincoln Partners grew to an organization of approximately 30 people and became a registered broker dealer.

In January 2006, Lincoln International was formed through the merger of Lincoln Partners and Peters Associates, two middle market investment banks based in the U.S. and Germany, respectively, as well as a team from KPMG joining to form a Paris office. At the time of the merger, Lincoln International had offices in Chicago, Frankfurt, New York and Paris. The two firms had previously worked together through a strategic joint venture established in 2005.

On May 20, 2026, the company completed an initial public offering (IPO) of its stock on the New York Stock Exchange.
