= Therapeutic target =

Therapeutic target may refer to:

- Biological target, a protein or nucleic acid whose activity can be modified by an external stimulus
- Therapeutic Targets Database, a database to provide information about the known and explored therapeutic targets
- Therapeutic target range, an alternative reference range
