= Per Svenningsson =

Swedish neurologist

- Born: 19 December 1968 (age 57)
- Education: MD, PhD, Karolinska Institutet, Stockholm, Sweden
- Known for: Pathophysiology of Parkinson's disease
- Awards: NASRAD Young Investigator Award, Royal Swedish Academy of Sciences Research Position
- Scientific career
- Fields: Neuroscience
- Workplaces: Karolinska Institutet, Stockholm, Sweden

Per Svenningsson is a neurologist specializing in the neuropharmacology of movement disorders such as Parkinson's disease. He is a professor of neurology at the Department of Clinical Neuroscience at the Karolinska Institutet and in the Department of Neurology at Karolinska University Hospital in Stockholm, Sweden. He is the team leader of a research group that studies the underlying pathogenic process of PD. Svenningsson is also a member of many research councils and committee, including the European College of Neuropsychopharmacology (ECNP, 2013-2016).

== Career ==
=== Education ===
Svenningsson received his MD and PhD from the Karolinska Institutet in Stockholm, Sweden, where he also completed postdoctoral research. In 2012 he was appointed full professor in the Department of Clinical Neuroscience and the Department of Neurology at the Karolinska University Hospital.

=== Research focus/interests ===
Svenningsson is the team leader of a research group that studies movement disorders such as Parkinson's disease at the molecular and cellular level. The focus of the group is to uncover non-motor symptoms of PD that manifest early on in the disease with the hopes of creating neuroprotective drugs to combat its progression.

=== Awards ===
Among Svenningsson's honors and awards are the NARSAD Young Investigator Award (2007), awarded to promising young scientists conducting neurobiological research by the Brain & Behavior Research Foundation. In 2008 he was awarded a researcher position at the Royal Swedish Academy of Sciences.

=== Positions of trust and research assessments ===
In addition to research and teaching, Svenningsson holds a number of positions of trust. He was a former grant reviewer for INSERM/ANR in France. He has been on the reviewing committee of the Finnish Medical Research Council, the Swedish Parkinson Fund, and the Norwegian Medical Research Council. He is a member of the Ulf von Euler Lecturer committee and a former councilor on the Executive Committee of the European College of Neuropsychopharmacology (ECNP).

== Publications ==
Svenningsson has published extensively, with an H-index of 41, 5,639 citations, 121 published articles, 15 reviews, and 7 book chapters.
