= Fisher House Foundation =

Charity in United States

- Founded: 1990
- Founder: Zachary and Elizabeth Fisher
- Type: Non-Profit Organization
- Purpose: Service members, veterans and their families
- Location: Rockville, Maryland, U.S.
- Method: Construction of comfortable temporary lodging facilities near military hospitals and Veterans Affairs Medical Centers
- Key people: Kenneth Fisher, Chairman and CEO
- Employees: 25
- Website: fisherhouse.org

Fisher House Foundation, Inc. is an international nonprofit that works alongside the Veterans Health Administration to provide complimentary quality of life services for active military members, veterans, and their families. The foundation primarily focuses on the construction of comfort homes designed to provide temporary lodging for family members of active military members and veterans while they receive treatment from US Department of Veterans Affairs (VA) hospitals and clinics. Fisher House Foundation comfort homes are located in close proximity to most major VA locations internationally.

Other Quality of Life programs offered by the foundation include the Hero Miles and Hotels for Heroes programs, ongoing assistance to Fisher Houses, scholarships, support for continuing rehabilitation initiatives, and individual assistance to members of the military and their families during a crisis.

== History and Organization ==
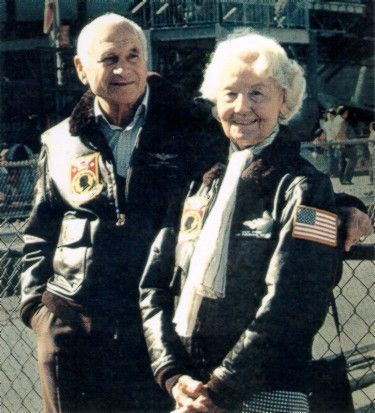
Zachary and Elizabeth Fisher

The Fisher House program was established in 1990 by Zachary Fisher and Elizabeth Fisher in response to the recognized need for housing for military families while their loved ones were hospitalized.

In 1991, the first Fisher House was inaugurated at the National Naval Medical Center (now Walter Reed Military Medical Center) in Bethesda, Maryland, with the presence of President George H. W. Bush and First Lady Barbara Bush during the dedication ceremony.

The Fishers entered into a “public-private partnership” with the government, allowing Fisher to construct these homes on government-owned land. Subsequently, these homes were "gifted" back to the military to operate in perpetuity. Their aim was to provide families with a "home away from home," enabling them to be a part of the healing process.

The Fishers continued to use their personal funds to construct additional homes until Zachary Fisher's passing in 1999.

Currently, Kenneth Fisher, Zachary’s grand-nephew, continues the legacy and serves as the Chairman and CEO of Fisher House Foundation. In 2022, Fisher received the Sylvanus Thayer Award from the United States Military Academy alumni association, recognizing the work of the Fisher House Foundation in supporting military and veterans’ families.

== Housing ==
External videos
- Fisher House Foundation - Building a Fisher House

As of September 2023, more than 95 Fisher Houses are in operation in the United States, Germany, and in the UK with partnership support from the Queen Elizabeth Hospital Birmingham Charity and Help for Heroes, which have opened accommodation for patients at the Royal Centre for Defence Medicine and their families. Several other sites have expanded beyond their original square footage to accommodate more families.

Fisher Houses have up to 21 suites, with private bedrooms and baths. Families share a common kitchen, laundry facilities, a warm dining room and an inviting living room.

== Impact ==
According to the organization's 2022 annual impact report, the foundation had more than 445,000 families stay in Fisher Houses since 1990, saving them more than $575 million in lodging and travel expenses.

The organization has also covered death gratuity payments of $100,000 USD to families of soldiers killed in the line of duty during government shut-downs. During the 16-day 2013 government shutdown, they provided $750,000 in grants to 30 families.

== Partnership ==
Over the years the Fisher House Foundation has partnered with other foundations, organizations, and companies in order, to raise money, stock the homes, and help those at the homes and military families. Some of those include;

- Newman's Own
- Suave
- Fuzzy's Vodka
- National Football League Players Association (NFLPA)
- Hope for the Warriors
- Food Lion Feeds
- Smokey Bones Bar & Fire Grill
- Samsung
- Walmart [Operation: Deck the Walls]

== Recognition ==
In 2018, the foundation was recognized as the top charity for supporting the military, veterans and their families, based on accountability, transparency and financial reports. Charity Navigator, a US charity rating agency, has designated the foundation with a four star rating for 16 consecutive years in 2019.

== See also ==
- Naval Support Activity Bethesda
- Ronald McDonald House Charities, a similar charity for civilians
