= Intrepid Museum =

Museum in Manhattan, New York

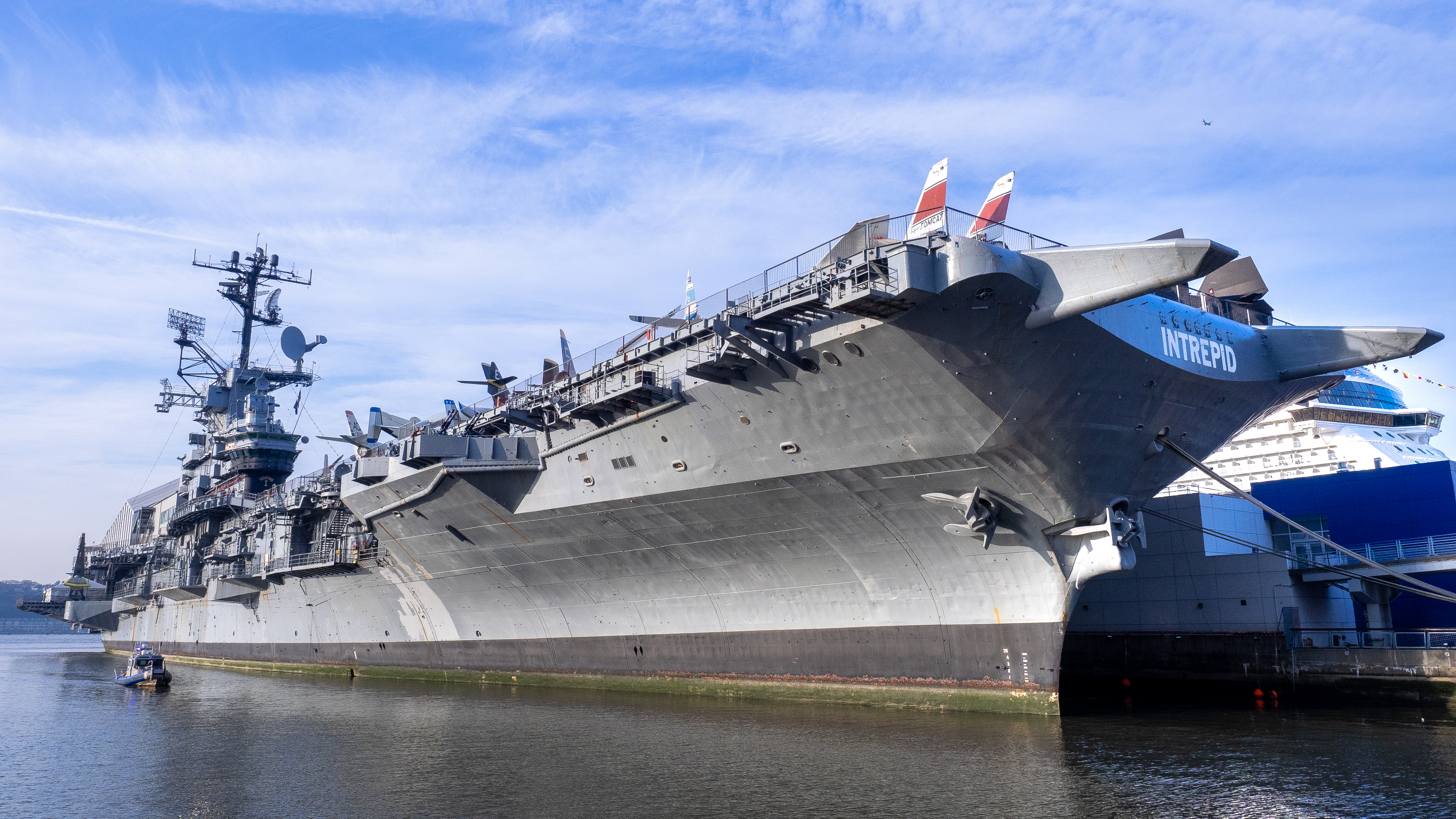
- Former name: Intrepid Sea, Air & Space Museum (until October 2023)
- Established: 1982
- Location: 12th Avenue and 46th Street, Manhattan, New York, U.S.
- Coordinates: 40.7646°N 73.9996°W
- Founder: Michael D. Piccola
- Director: Susan Marenoff-Zausner
- Public transit access: Bus: M12, M42, M50; Subway: at 42nd Street–Port Authority Bus Terminal
- Website: intrepidmuseum.org

The Intrepid Museum (originally the Intrepid Sea, Air & Space Museum) is a military, aerospace, and history museum in New York City, United States. It is located at Pier 86 at 46th Street, along the Hudson River, in the Hell's Kitchen neighborhood on the West Side of Manhattan. The museum is composed of exhibits, aircraft, and the Space Shuttle Pavilion aboard the museum ship USS Intrepid, a World War II–era aircraft carrier and National Historic Landmark. Its collections include a cruise missile submarine named USS Growler and a Concorde on Pier 86. The Intrepid Museum Foundation, a 501(c)(3) organization established in 1979, operates the museum.

The museum was proposed in the late 1970s as a way to preserve Intrepid, and it opened on August 3, 1982. The Intrepid Museum Foundation filed for bankruptcy protection in 1985 after struggling to attract visitors. The foundation acquired USS Growler and the destroyer USS Edson in the late 1980s to attract guests and raise money, although it remained unprofitable through the 1990s. The museum received a minor renovation in 1998 after it started turning a profit. Between 2006 and 2008, the Intrepid Museum was completely closed for a $115 million renovation. A new pavilion for the atmospheric test flight Space Shuttle Enterprise opened in 2012.

The Intrepid Museum spans three of the carrier's decks; from top to bottom, they are the flight, hangar, and gallery decks. Most of the museum's collection is composed of aircraft, many of which were used by the United States Armed Forces. Among the museum's collection are a Concorde SST, a Lockheed A-12 supersonic reconnaissance plane, and the Space Shuttle Enterprise. The hangar and gallery decks contain a variety of attractions such as exhibit halls, a theater, and flight simulators, as well as individual objects like a cockpit and an air turbine. Several craft and other objects have been sold off or removed from the museum's collection over the years. The museum serves as a space for community and national events, such as Fleet Week and awards ceremonies, in addition to educational programs.

== History ==
=== Context and founding ===
USS Intrepid, an Essex-class aircraft carrier, was launched in 1943. The ship participated in World War II and the Vietnam War, and she served as a recovery ship for space missions. Intrepid was supposed to be scrapped after decommissioning in the late 1970s, but Odysseys in Flight, a nonprofit organization founded by Michael D. Piccola and Bruce Sherer, wished to convert Intrepid into a museum ship. Odysseys in Flight had initially planned to salvage the carriers Lexington or Franklin D. Roosevelt. The United States Navy wanted the organization to raise $3 million for the carrier's upkeep. The organization hosted an exhibit at 6 World Trade Center to raise support for the project, and Odysseys in Flight had raised $2 million by March 1979. One of the museum's largest supporters was local real estate developer Zachary Fisher, who established the Intrepid Museum Foundation in March 1978 and contributed over $25 million to the museum during his lifetime. Fisher was enthusiastic about the project, eventually attracting other high-profile supporters such as radio and TV personality Arthur Godfrey and actress Maureen O'Hara. The Navy also hoped that Intrepid could be used for recruitment.

Mayor Ed Koch announced plans for the Intrepid's conversion in mid-April 1981, and the United States Department of the Navy transferred the Intrepid to Fisher, who led the nonprofit Intrepid Museum Foundation, on April 27, 1981. The conversion of the carrier's top two decks cost $22 million and was funded by $2.4 million in private donations, as well as $15.2 million of tax-exempt bonds and $4.5 million from the United States Department of Housing and Urban Development. After the New York City Board of Estimate gave the Intrepid Museum Foundation permission to sell tax-exempt bonds in December 1980, the bonds were sold to the public in July 1981. The federal grant was approved in January 1982, even though the project "had nothing to do with housing". The renovation involved the addition of a theater, several planes on Intrepid's deck, and aviation and maritime exhibit halls. The carrier's navigation and flight bridges were also restored. The city spent around $2.5 million to renovate Pier 86 on the West Side of Manhattan, where Intrepid was to be docked. The museum leased the pier from the city for 33 years at $50,000 per year, making annual payments in lieu of taxes totaling $400,000.

Intrepid was towed to her permanent home at Pier 86 in June 1982. Following a soft opening on July 4, the museum opened on August 3, 1982, as the Intrepid Sea, Air & Space Museum. This made Intrepid the second aircraft carrier in the U.S. to be converted into a museum, after the USS Yorktown. Larry Sawinski was named as the museum's director of exhibits. When the Intrepid Museum opened, it showcased several aircraft and spacecraft, and it also contained an exhibit on the early history of carriers. The exhibit halls on hangar level (including Pioneer Hall and Navy Hall), as well as the theater, were not completed. Maritime and aviation schools were planned for the lower two decks, the renovation of which was expected to cost $22 million. The museum had 50 paid staff, who worked mostly in the cafeteria, gift shop, and ticket booths; another 100 volunteers were responsible for the museum's displays and expansion. The museum's opening was expected to create 469 jobs in the surrounding area, though many of these jobs never materialized.

=== 1980s ===
The Intrepid Museum Foundation dedicated the Hall of Honor, the United States' first archive dedicated to Medal of Honor recipients, on December 10, 1983; the Medal of Honor Society also relocated into offices within the carrier. The museum originally was projected to attract 1.3 to 1.4 million visitors annually, but it recorded only half of this amount in its first year. This forced the museum's directors to delay payments on its debt. The museum had recorded 450,000 patrons in 1984, nearly half of the 800,000 annual patrons that were required to break even. Attendance had been negatively impacted because of the lack of nearby public transit, and the museum struggled to raise money despite increasing its ticket prices. Nonetheless, the museum planned to expand by 1984; it had received $250,000 from the Astor Foundation for classrooms and conference rooms, and the New York state government gave $850,000 for historic preservation. Film and television executive Stanley Abrams was named as the museum's president in June 1984.

The Intrepid Museum Foundation filed for Chapter 11 bankruptcy protection in 1985, declaring $28.4 million in debt and $16.5 million in assets. Only about a third of the museum's revenues came from admissions, with the remaining two-thirds coming from grants, donations, or fundraisers and other such events. Nonetheless, museum officials planned to continue normal operations and launch a campaign to attract visitors; Lawrence Sowinski, the director of exhibits, described the museum as "too valuable a resource to close". Advertising firm McCann-Erickson was hired to promote the museum, running cheap advertisements in newspapers, on the radio, and in New York City Subway cars. The state also provided $1.024 million for the museum in its 1985 budget, though ultimately the museum got $850,000. Intrepid was officially designated as a National Historic Landmark in 1986, and its annual allocation from the state was raised to $895,000 that year. Investigators announced in early 1987 that members of the Westies gang had engaged in racketeering, stealing $100,000 to $120,000 annually from the Intrepid Museum.

During the late 1980s, the museum had 400,000 annual visitors; its low attendance was attributed to competition from more popular tourist attractions. Additionally, the museum was the only major point of interest on the rundown Hudson River waterfront, in part due to delays in the construction of nearby developments such as Javits Center. The Intrepid Museum Foundation presented a reorganization plan to the U.S. Bankruptcy Court in July 1987, in which nearly half of the museum's $28.4 million debt would be forgiven, but creditors would only receive a portion of their claims. After successfully exiting bankruptcy proceedings, the museum planned to display a submarine alongside Intrepid. Fisher funded the addition of two permanent exhibits in the late 1980s, at which point Intrepid had 39 aircraft. USS Growler, a Grayback-class submarine that carried nuclear Regulus missiles, was towed to the museum in late 1988 and opened to the public the next May. USS Edson, a Forrest Sherman-class destroyer that was the last all-gun destroyer in the United States Navy, was displayed at the Intrepid Museum starting in July 1989. At the time, the museum had few repeat visitors, and Fisher hoped that Growler and Edson would attract returning patrons.

=== 1990s ===
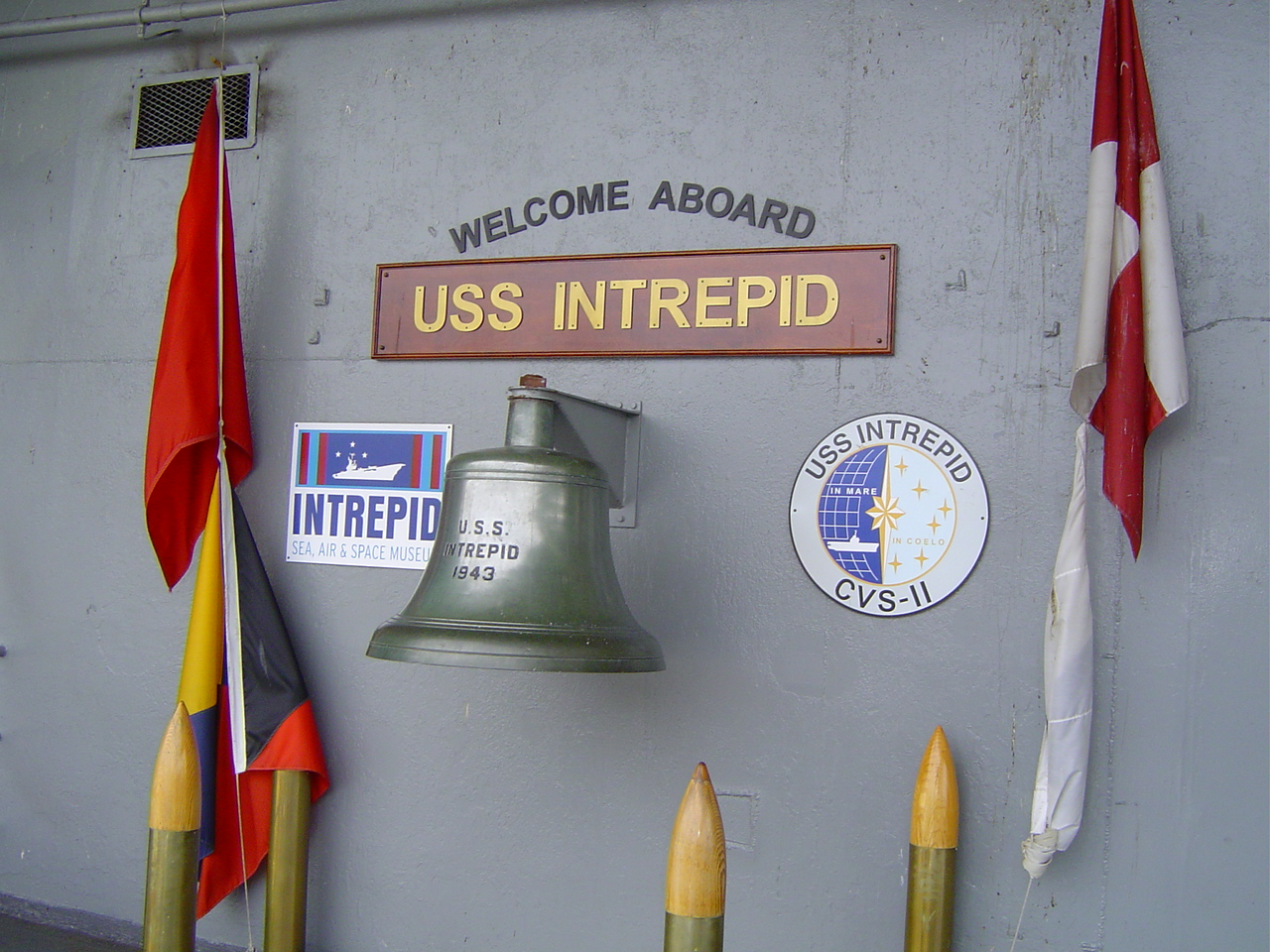
Museum entrance

The outbreak of the Gulf War in the early 1990s caused interest in the Intrepid Museum to increase; at the time, the museum was displaying an exhibit on the Gulf War. By early 1991, the museum recorded 5,000 visitors on a typical weekend, more than twice the previous year's weekend patronage. The Intrepid Museum received $900,000 from the state, $350,000 from the New York City Board of Education, and $60,000 from the city government annually. All of this funding was eliminated in 1992, forcing the museum to fire a quarter of its staff, and two young men formed the Intrepid Museum Society and raised money through various events. The Intrepid Museum held numerous fundraisers and received $1.1 million from numerous city and state agencies between 1992 and 1996. Despite this, the museum continued to struggle to remain solvent; the Village Voice wrote in 1996 that "the continued taxpayer subsidies seem hard to justify". Although the museum rented Pier 86 from the city for $252,000 annually, it paid no rent between March 1995 and October 1997.

To raise money, the museum tried to acquire the decommissioned amphibious assault ship Guadalcanal in 1994, berth her next to Intrepid, and use Guadalcanal as a heliport. Although the United States Senate approved the plan, residents of the Hell's Kitchen neighborhood objected to the fact that the heliport would cut off their access to Pier 84. That year, the museum received part of a $1 million appropriation earmarked for the restoration of the USS Constellation in Baltimore. The museum remained unprofitable, recording a $1 million loss in 1996. Annual revenue from ticket sales totaled $3 million, less than half of the museum's budget; donations and event rentals covered the rest of the budget. Agencies that had loaned planes to the Intrepid Museum, such as the Air Force Museum Foundation, expressed concerns that the museum was incapable of properly maintaining the aircraft. After the Guadalcanal plan was canceled in early 1996, the Intrepid Museum launched an advertising campaigns to attract patrons; previously, most of its publicity came from word of mouth and public service announcements.

Retired Marine Corps General Donald Ray Gardner replaced Sowinski as the Intrepid Museum Foundation's president in September 1996. Gardner laid off staff, sharply restricted expense spending, deaccessioned some costly artifacts, and reduced the number of planes on exhibit. Gardner also planned to add electronic kiosks to attract children, as well as develop an endowment fund. U.S. President Bill Clinton approved $13 million for a renovation of the Intrepid Museum in late 1997, over his staff's objections to the project; at the time, the museum had 500,000 annual visitors. The next year, Gardner closed the Intrepid Museum for a minor renovation, the first in its history; the museum reopened in February 1998 with two new exhibits. The city waived $600,000 in unpaid rent, as well as future rent payments for Pier 86, in late 1998 after Fisher donated to mayor Rudy Giuliani. By then, the museum received hundreds of thousands of dollars annually from the Navy, the state, and the New York City Department of Cultural Affairs.

In mid-1999, retired Marine Corps general Martin R. Steele took over as the Intrepid Museum Foundation's president and began planning 15 modifications to exhibits and 17 construction projects, including a $5.25 million renovation of the flight deck. Steele wished to attract students and increase annual patronage to 1.2 million, and he installed interactive kiosks within a year of taking over. Restaurant Associates took over the museum's food service the same year to accommodate the high number of after-hours parties and events at the Intrepid Museum. The Intrepid Museum constructed a new visitor center at 46th Street and 12th Avenue that year. In addition, the museum planned to improve Pier 86, build a 245-seat theater, and erect a pedestrian overpass on 12th Avenue.

=== 2000s ===
As part of a project announced in May 2001, Earth Tech Inc. built a cable-stayed bridge connecting the museum to the east side of 12th Avenue. By then, nearly half of the museum's patrons hailed from foreign countries, and Steele described the Intrepid as the "largest naval museum in the world". After the September 11 attacks, the museum was temporarily closed and served as temporary field headquarters for the Federal Bureau of Investigation (FBI) while they investigated the attacks. Additionally, part of the flight deck was cleared to make way for a temporary helipad. The museum reopened after five weeks and hosted an exhibit commemorating attack victims. The footbridge across 12th Avenue was completed in May 2003 for $11 million. Its construction experienced delays because of difficulties in constructing the foundations and because of the need to decontaminate the site.

A Concorde supersonic aircraft was towed to the Intrepid Museum in November 2003, making the museum one of two in the United States with a Concorde. In conjunction with this acquisition, the museum created a new exhibit on transatlantic crossings. Also in late 2003, the Intrepid Museum offered to resell Edson back to the Navy, citing the fact that the adjacent pier needed to be repaired and could not be used for berthing Edson. After Edson was removed from the Intrepid Museum in 2004, the Navy sold the destroyer to the Saginaw Valley Naval Ship Museum. The Michael Tyler Fisher Center for Education opened within the museum in 2004, and the Fisher Center for Alzheimer's Research Foundation, cofounded by the Fishers, occupied some space during the early 2000s. By the middle of that decade, the museum had 750,000 visitors per year, including over 100,000 students; it had recorded ten million all-time visitors by August 2005. The museum spent $17 million annually just on overhead costs.

==== Renovation ====
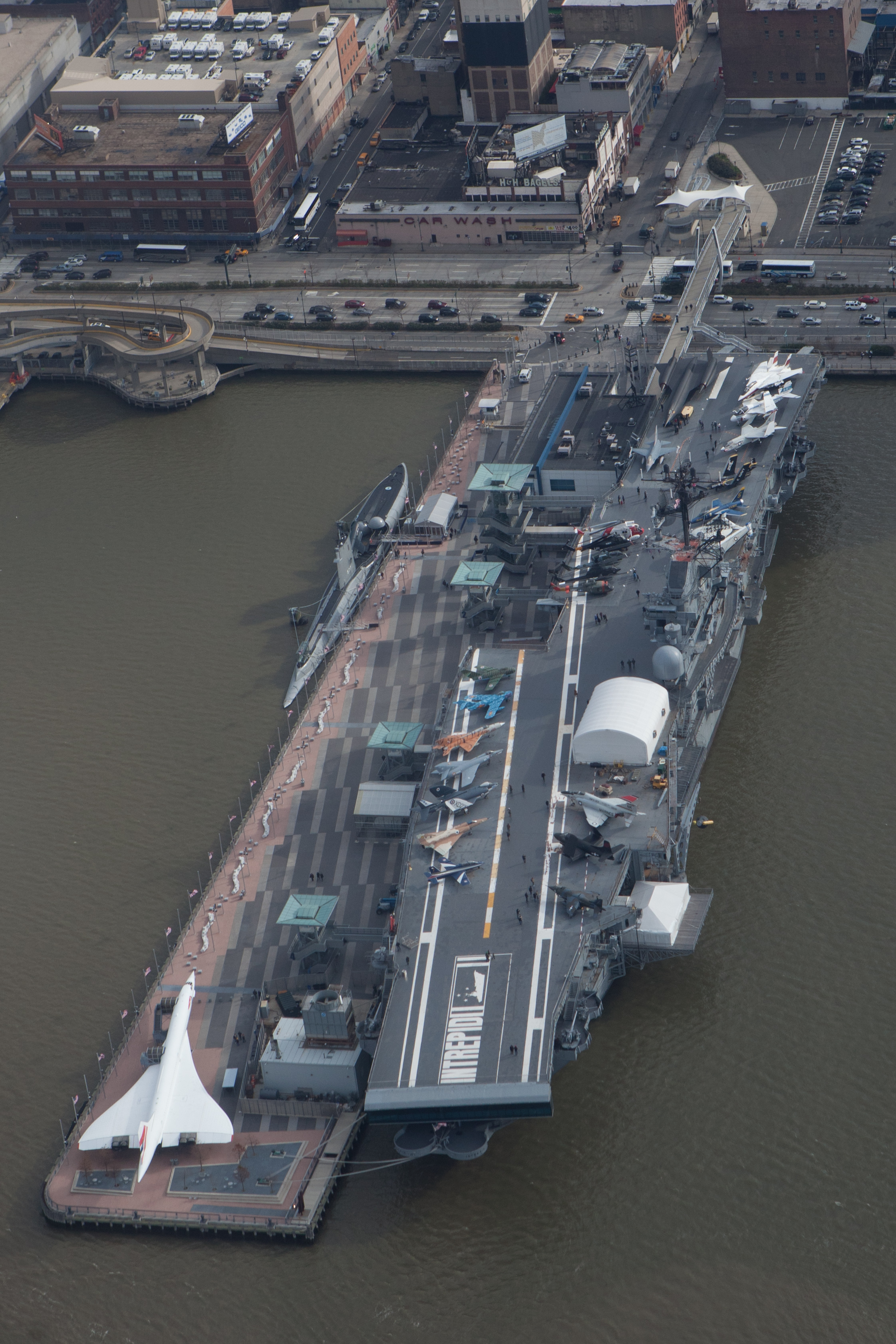
Aerial view of the museum from the Hudson River, 2011

By June 2006, the Intrepid Museum Foundation executives had notified state and federal governments of their plans to renovate Intrepid, though few details of this renovation were disclosed publicly. The foundation had already asked the United States Army Corps of Engineers to help dredge the mud around the keel so tugboats could tow her to a dry dock. That July, the foundation announced that Intrepid, along with Pier 86, would undergo renovations and repairs. Initially, the project was supposed to cost $58 million and take 18 months. The project was to be funded with $31 million from the federal government, $17 million from the New York City Council, and $5 million from the state; the city later increased its share to $23 million. Intrepid closed on October 1, 2006, in preparation for being towed to a dry dock at the Military Ocean Terminal in Bayonne, New Jersey. Museum officials had decided to tow the carrier away, as they estimated that the project would cost $100 million and take five years if Intrepid were left in place.

Just before the renovation was scheduled to begin, Newsday reported that corrupt activities may have been involved in the renovation contract for Pier 86, prompting concerns that Intrepid and the Intrepid Museum Foundation were being investigated. Furthermore, after the dry dock in Bayonne was found to be deteriorated, museum officials decided to move Intrepid to another pier in that city until the dry dock was repaired. The scheduled move on November 6, 2006, was delayed when Intrepid's propellers stuck in the Hudson River mud, preventing tugboats from moving the ship out of her berth. The Navy and USACE spent $3 million to extricate the carrier, removing 39,000 cubic yards (30,000 m^{3}) of sediment and mud from the propellers and pier., Tugboats made a successful second attempt on December 5, 2006. By the end of the year, Growler was also towed to Bayonne for renovation, while the Concorde on Pier 86 was floated to Floyd Bennett Field so the pier could be repaired. The Intrepid Museum Foundation also sold $7.08 million in bonds to fund its continuing operations.

Pier 86 was demolished and rebuilt to accommodate plumbing and cables, which had not been present in the original pier. After sitting at a cruise-ship port for four months, Intrepid was towed to dry dock in April 2007 and received exterior modifications, including new paint, new propellers, and a restored hull. After exterior modifications were completed, the carrier was towed to Staten Island, New York, for interior repairs in June 2007, on the anniversary of D-Day. At Staten Island, Intrepid's facilities were upgraded and expanded; for example, workers replaced 80,000 square feet (7,400 m^{2}) on Intrepid's three top decks. The fo'c'sle was restored, the starboard side and flight deck were deoxidized, a new aircraft elevator was installed, and new wiring was installed. The firm of Perkins + Will was hired to redesign several exhibits and create other exhibits within space that had been closed to the public. The exterior renovations were budgeted at $4.8 million, while the interior cost another $6 million to $8 million.

The renovation, including the cost of Pier 86, ultimately cost $115 million or $120 million. The cost overruns almost bankrupted the museum, which asked donors and politicians to contribute an additional $10 million each to the project. The carrier was towed back to Pier 86 at the beginning of October 2008, and the Concorde was moved back to Pier 86. The museum reopened to the public on November 8. Four aircraft were added to the museum's collection when the museum reopened. At the time, the Intrepid Museum planned to attract one million annual visitors, with ten percent of this figure being students. Museum officials hired advertising firm Austin & Williams to promote the museum.

=== 2010s to present ===
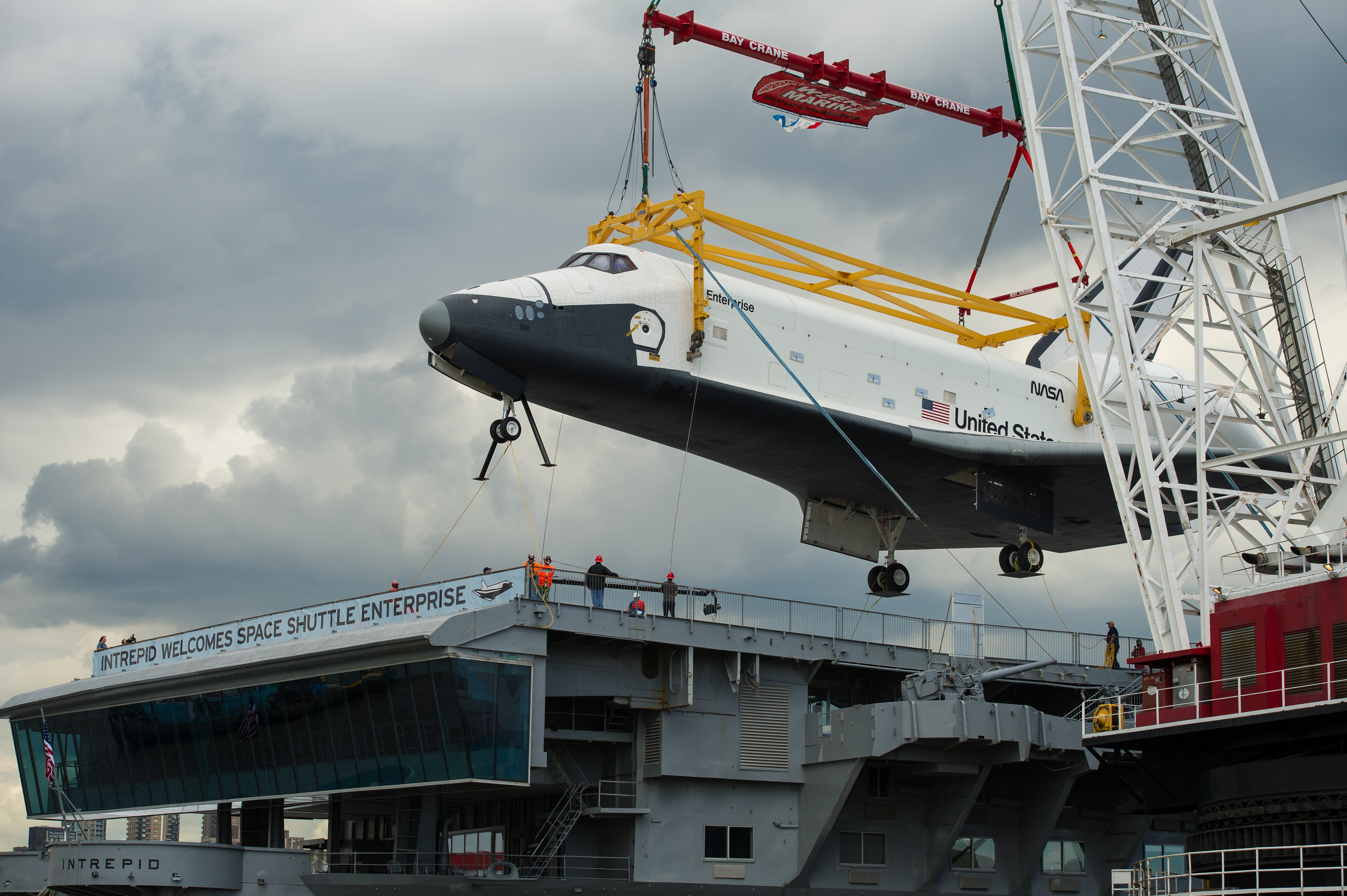
Enterprise being lowered onto Intrepid in 2012

The museum's president Bill White, who had overseen the 2000s renovation, resigned in 2010 and was succeeded the next year by Susan Marenoff-Zausner, who had been the executive director. Before resigning, White had tried to obtain a Space Shuttle for the museum's collection. The Intrepid Museum announced in May 2011 that it would acquire the Space Shuttle Enterprise. It initially planned to exhibit the Space Shuttle on Pier 86, but then announced plans to display the spacecraft in a parking lot across 12th Avenue, prompting U.S. Senator Sherrod Brown to ask that NASA award the shuttle to another museum. The museum took title to the spacecraft that December, after engineers determined that it was safe to fly on the Shuttle Carrier Aircraft once again. Enterprise was flown to the nearby JFK Airport in April 2012 and then moved by barge to the Intrepid Museum that June. To make room for the Enterprise display, three aircraft were transferred to the Empire State Aerosciences Museum near Schenectady, New York. The Enterprise went on public display July 19, 2012, at the Intrepid Museum's Space Shuttle Pavilion, originally charging an additional fee for admission.

The museum was closed in October 2012 due to Hurricane Sandy, which damaged Enterprise. Although the museum reopened that December, the Space Shuttle Pavilion did not reopen until July 2013. Museum officials contemplated erecting a permanent pavilion for Enterprise on Pier 86 or on a parking lot across 12th Avenue. At the time, the museum had 915,000 annual visitors.

Due to the COVID-19 pandemic in New York City, the museum was closed between March and September 2020, though it continued to host online events during its closure. The museum's Concorde aircraft, which had been displayed on Pier 86, was removed for restoration in 2023 and towed back to the Intrepid Museum in March 2024. As part of the project, the museum added 4,000 square feet (370 m^{2}) of park space to Pier 86. The Intrepid Museum dropped "Sea, Air & Space" from its official name in October 2023 as part of a rebranding. In May 2024, the museum opened 4,000 square feet (370 m^{2}) of space on Pier 86 as a public park. Early the following year, the New York state government announced plans to redevelop one of the Intrepid Museum's parking lots on the east side of 12th Avenue. In addition, the museum completed a restoration of the USS Growler in 2024, reopening the vessel with upgraded visitor pathways and new interactive panels, and it opened a permanent World War II exhibit in 2025.

== Description ==
The Intrepid Museum is located along Hudson River Park at the intersection of 46th Street and 12th Avenue, within the Hell's Kitchen neighborhood on the West Side of Midtown Manhattan in New York City. Most of the collection is on board Intrepid, the third Essex-class carrier built and one of four preserved Essex-class carriers, besides Yorktown, Lexington, and Hornet. When Intrepid was converted into a museum ship, only one-quarter of her area was accessible to the public. Additionally, many of the carrier's equipment, including the large airplane elevators, were disabled. One of the carrier's former elevators, which transported planes between the flight and hangar decks, was converted into a theater. Due to regulations that require "easy passage", and to prevent theft, much of Intrepid's equipment has been removed or relocated.

=== Flight, hangar, and gallery decks ===
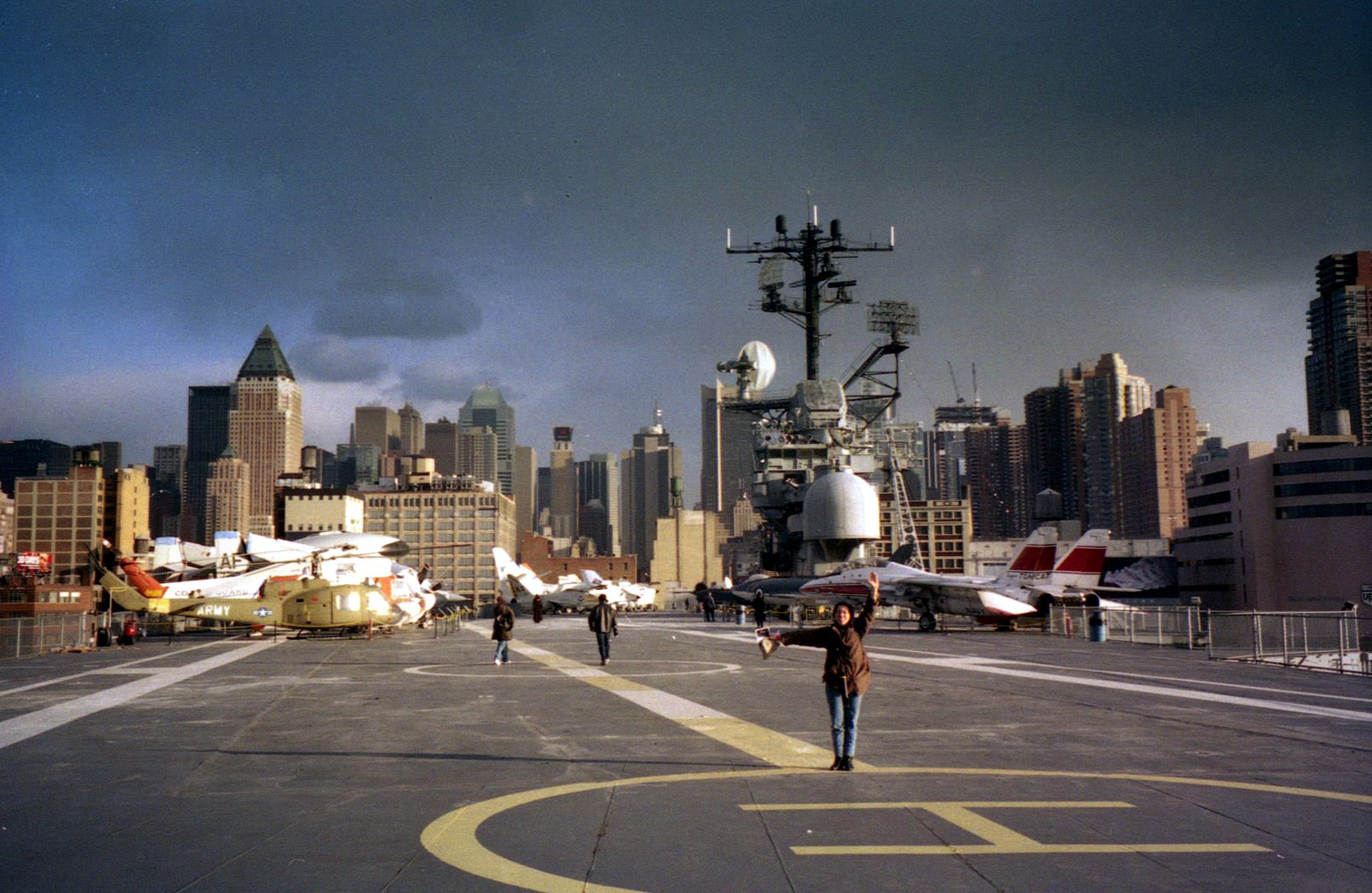
Flight deck of Intrepid

The Intrepid Museum spans three of the carrier's decks; due to fire-safety regulations, Intrepid's other decks remain closed to the public. The carrier's topmost deck, the flight deck, showcases many of the museum's craft (see Intrepid Museum § Exhibits and collection). The Space Shuttle Enterprise is housed within a pavilion on the flight deck, originally within an inflatable tent placed on the stern of Intrepid. The superstructure's command bridges are accessible to the public. There is a three-inch weapon mount on the carrier's island on the starboard side, as well as an anti-aircraft mount in a gun tub on the starboard bow. There is a hangar workshop on the flight deck, which is open to visitors. Also on the flight deck is a plaque marking the spot where a 1944 kamikaze attack killed 22 crew members.

The museum's main entrance has been through the carrier's hangar deck, below the flight deck, since 2008. The hangar deck originally contained four permanent exhibit halls, in addition to a space for temporary exhibits. The original permanent exhibit halls were Pioneer Hall, which was dedicated to early air travel; Technology Hall, which contained displays about spaceflight; Navy Hall, which had Navy artifacts and a film; and Intrepid Hall, which discussed Intrepid's role in World War II. The exhibits about the oldest artifacts were originally toward the rear or aft; the back of the carrier contained a cafeteria, bathrooms, and a terrace on the stern. The hangar deck also contains a space dedicated to Medal of Honor recipients, as well as some aviation artifacts and plaques detailing the carrier's history and exhibits. Also on the hangar deck is the Exploreum, an interactive hall with exhibits such as a full-size Bell 47 helicopter. The hangar deck also has an education center and 17,000-square-foot (1,600 m^{2}) event space called Michael Tyler Fisher Center, as well as the 245-seat Lutnick Theater, which shows a 16-minute film on the carrier's history. A 1950s-era escalator on Intrepid leads between the hangar and flight decks; it is no longer operational, but visitors can climb up it.

The gallery deck houses the Combat Information Center and Men of the Intrepid exhibits. At the front of the carrier, artifacts from the officers' quarters are displayed in the fo'c'sle, which was opened to the public in 2008. The junior officers' and general berthing quarters are publicly accessible, and the crew's quarters are open to the public as well. There are replicas of two rooms that were created when the mess was subdivided in the 1970s. The middle of the carrier contains a hole that allows visitors to see through seven decks.

The museum originally displayed newsreels of pre–World War II events, dioramas of World War II battles, and models of ships. By the 1990s, the museum also featured an undersea-exploration hall, a children's ride, a flight simulator, as well as a bathysphere that was closed to the public. Following the 2008 renovation, the museum has contained three flight simulators, a 4D theater, and interactive exhibits for children. There is also an exhibit space dedicated to Zachary Fisher and his wife Elizabeth M. Fisher. The Michael Tyler Fisher Center for Education occupies a three-story 18,000-square-foot (1,700 m^{2}) space in the museum, with a meeting space, breakout rooms, and classrooms.

=== Other structures ===
There were originally two gift shops: one at the entrance to Pier 86 and one on the hangar deck. The current 17,000-square-foot (1,600 m^{2}) visitor center at 46th Street and 12th Avenue, completed in 1999, replaces the original 3,000-square-foot (280 m^{2}) visitor center. The new edifice had a metal and glass facade, and it incorporated about one-fourth of the old visitor center. A bridge measuring 277 feet (84 m) long connects the museum to a ramp on the eastern side of 12th Avenue. This bridge contains a central 59-foot-tall (18 m) tower, as well as sail-shaped fabric canopies.

== Exhibits and collection ==
=== Aircraft ===
All of the aircraft on Intrepid's flight deck are retired craft that are no longer capable of flying, either due to mechanical problems or because they had flown more than their maximum flight hours. Many of the aircraft lack engines, and some were disassembled before arriving at the museum. According to The New York Times, the vast majority of aircraft were transported to the museum by airplane, helicopter, or barge. One aircraft, a Bell AH-1J Sea Cobra gunship, flew to the museum under its own power before its engine was removed. Visitors cannot ordinarily go inside the aircraft.

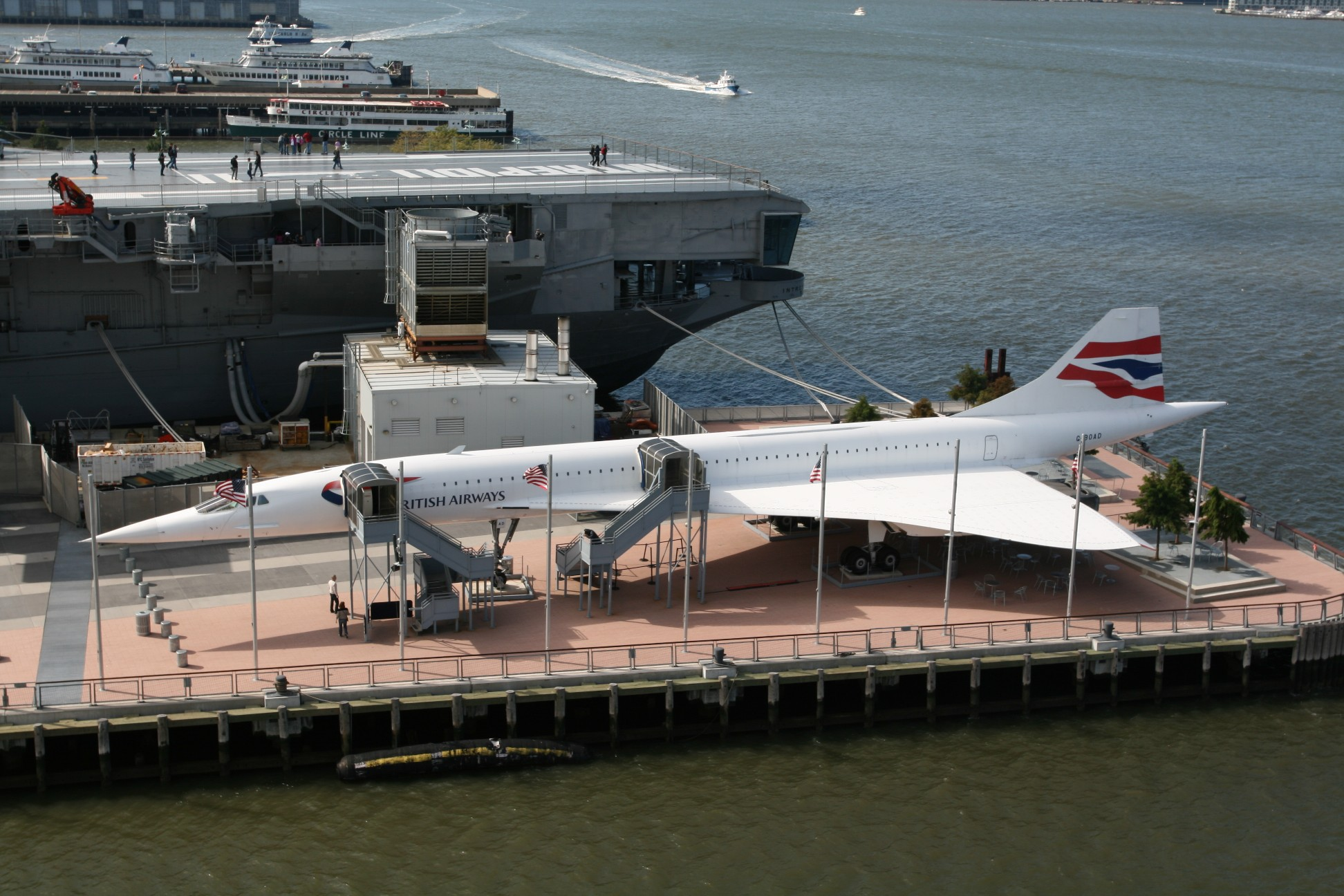
British Airways Concorde G-BOAD seen next to Intrepid

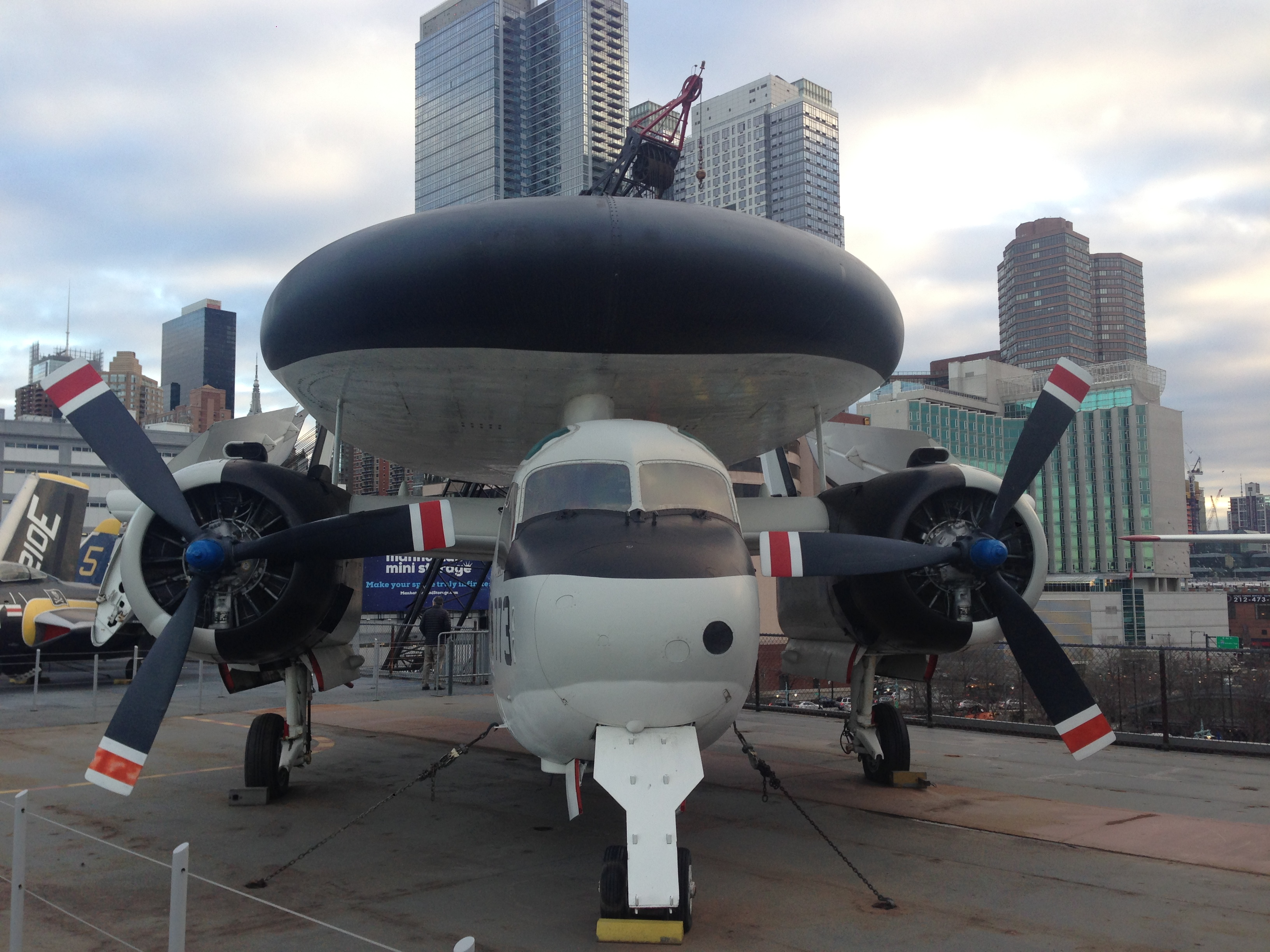
E-1 Tracer exhibit

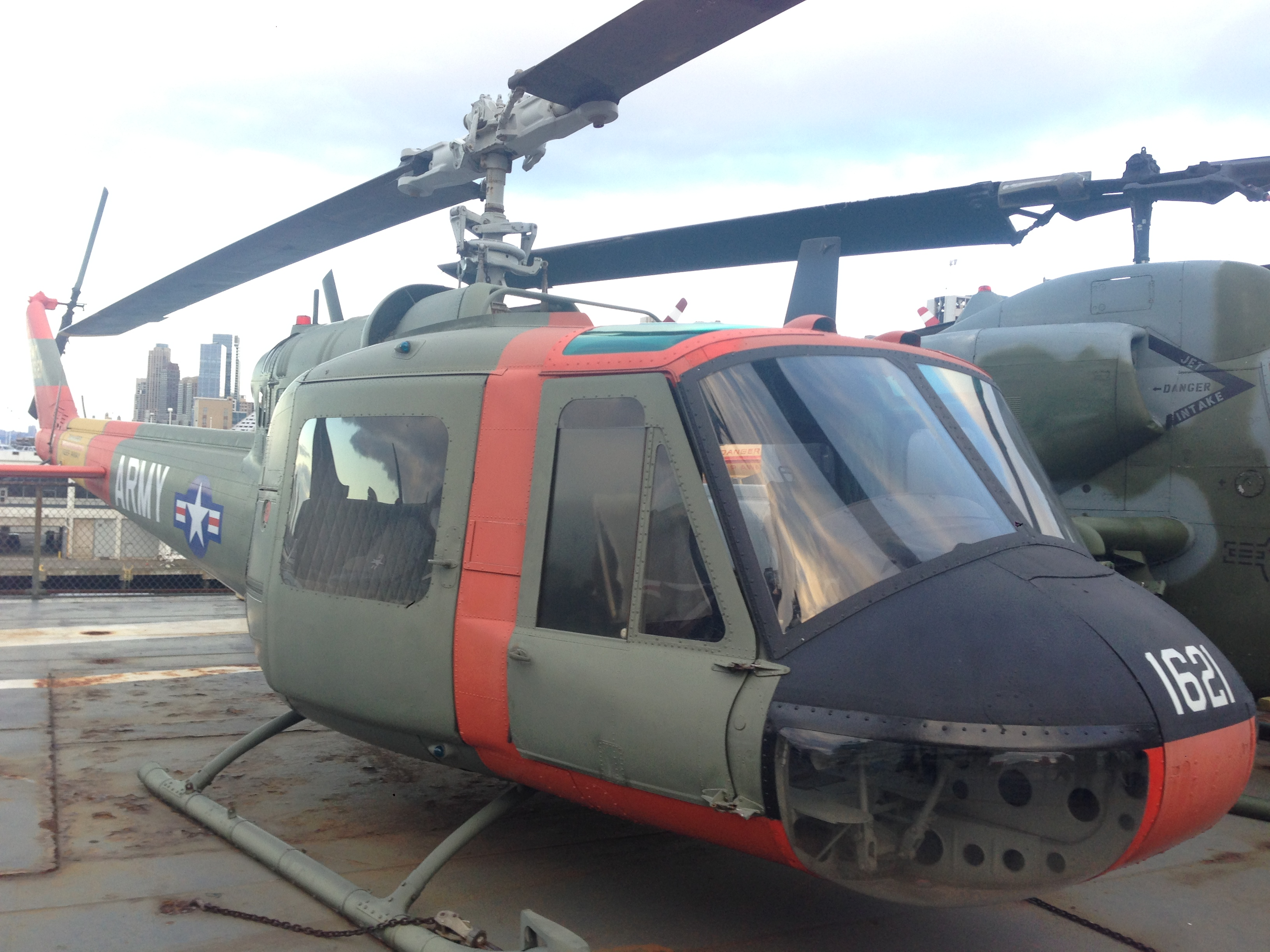
Bell UH-1 Iroquois exhibit

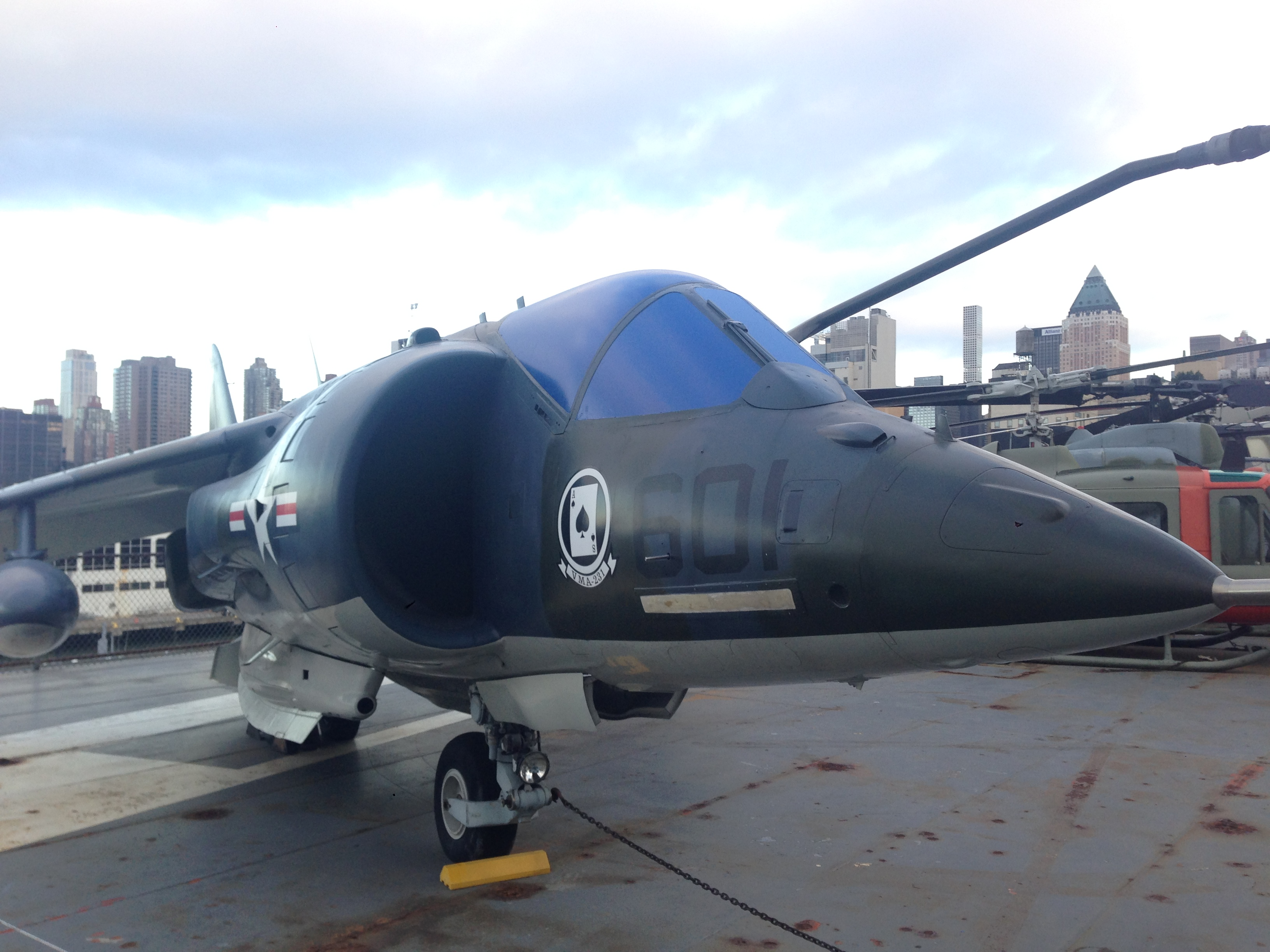
AV-8C Harrier exhibit

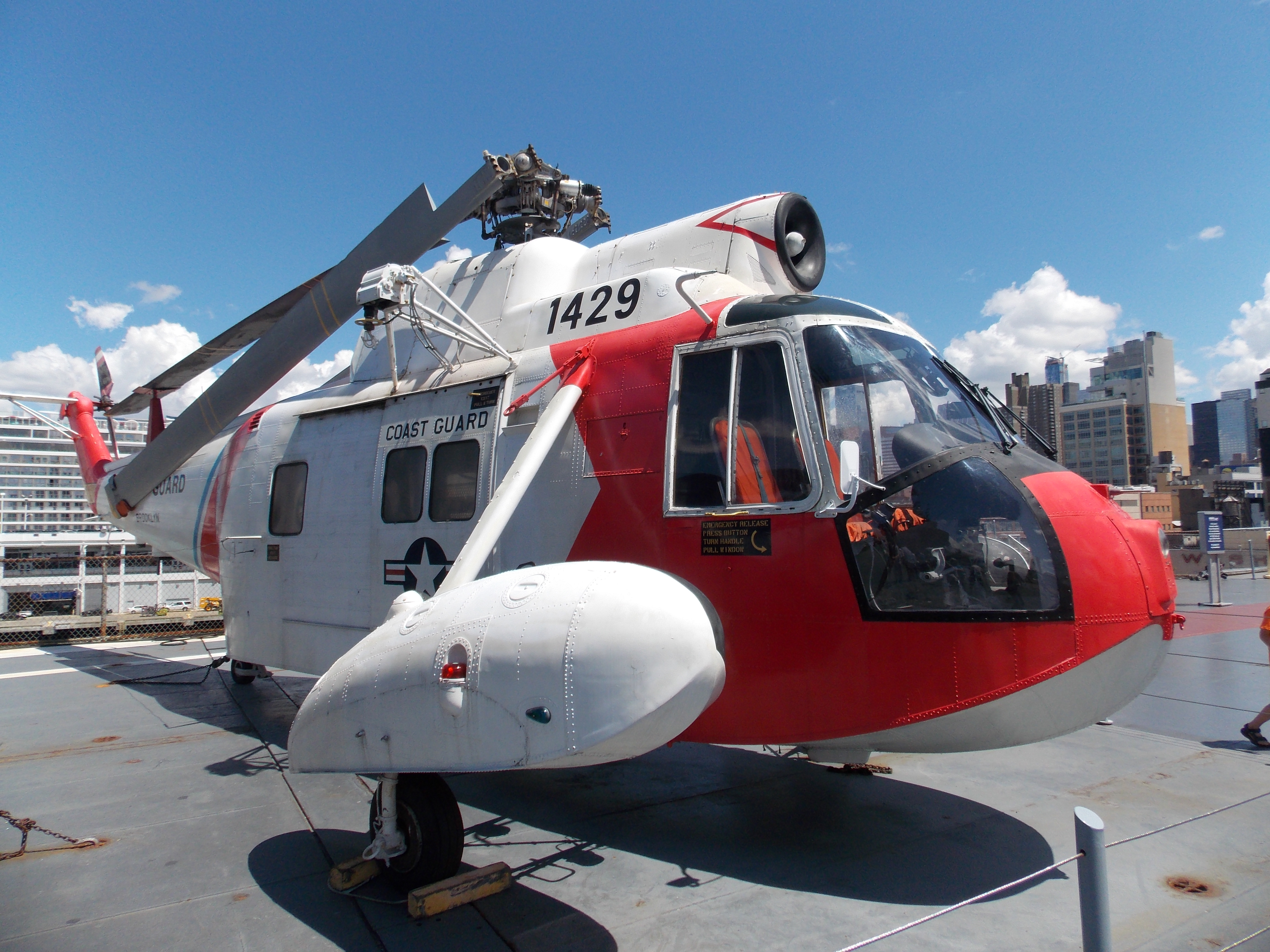
Sikorsky HH-52 Seaguard Helicopter Exhibit

==== Bombers/attack ====
- Douglas A-1 Skyraider from the US Navy
- Douglas A-4 Skyhawk from the US Navy, served on Intrepid between 1966 and 1969
- Grumman A-6 Intruder from the US Navy, used as a testbed for new radar and avionics in 1988
- Grumman TBM-3E Avenger from the US Navy

==== Fighters ====
- Goodyear FG-1D Corsair from the US Navy
- Grumman F-11 Tiger from the US Navy, once jet number 5 of the Blue Angels
- McDonnell F3H Demon from the US Navy
- Douglas F4D Skyray from the US Navy
- Mikoyan-Gurevich MiG-21 from Poland
- North American FJ-2/-3 Fury from the US Navy
- PZL-Mielec Lim-5 (MiG-17), built in Poland and painted in North Vietnamese camouflage
- Vought F-8 Crusader from the US Navy

==== Multirole ====
- General Dynamics F-16A Fighting Falcon, a multi-role fighter aircraft. This particular F-16 was flown by the US Air Force in Operation Desert Storm.
- Grumman F-9 Cougar, a carrier-based fighter from the US Navy
- Grumman F-14 Tomcat, a carrier-based fighter/interceptor. This particular Tomcat was used in 1973 as a Super Tomcat prototype.
- Hawker Siddeley AV-8C Harrier, a V/STOL aircraft. This particular Harrier was flown by the US Marine Corps.
- McDonnell Douglas F-4 Phantom II, a carrier-based fighter. This particular Phantom was flown by the US Marine Corps during Operation Eagle Claw in 1980.
- IAI Kfir (F-21A Lion) from Israel

==== Helicopters ====
- Bell UH-1A Iroquois from the US Army
- Bell AH-1J Sea Cobra gunship from the US Marine Corps
- Piasecki HUP-2 Retriever, painted to resemble a similar helicopter that was once based from Intrepid
- Sikorsky H-19 Chickasaw from the US Coast Guard
- Sikorsky HH-52 Seaguard from the US Coast Guard

==== Reconnaissance and surveillance ====
- Grumman E-1B Tracer from the US Navy
- Lockheed A-12 Blackbird (#60-6925 / Article 122) flown by the CIA. This particular A-12 was the first production example of its model.

==== Trainers ====
- Aermacchi MB-339 used by the Italian Air Force. This particular MB-339 is painted in the colors of the Frecce Tricolor.
- Beechcraft T-34 Mentor used by the US Navy
- Northrop T-38 Talon used by NASA

==== Concorde ====
In 2003, the museum received a Concorde, registered G-BOAD, that had been used by British Airways. This airplane set a world speed record for passenger airliners on February 7, 1996, when it flew between London and New York in 2 hours, 52 minutes and 59 seconds. This airplane logged the most flying hours (23,397) of the 20 Concordes built; it typically occupies an exhibit space on Pier 86.

=== Ships ===
The vast majority of the museum's collection is displayed on the Essex-class aircraft carrier Intrepid. Like other "long-hull" Essex-class carriers, Intrepid has a displacement of 27,100 tonnes (26,700 long tons; 29,900 short tons). She has an overall length of 872 feet (266 m), a beam of 147 feet 6 inches (44.96 m), and a draft of 28 feet 7 inches (8.71 m). (Note: These are the official measurements given by the U.S. Navy. Various news sources have given different measurements.) Most of the museum's aircraft and spacecraft are on Intrepid's flight deck (see Intrepid Museum § Flight, hangar, and gallery decks).

USS Growler, a diesel electric submarine which carried out nuclear deterrent patrols armed with Regulus missiles, is berthed next to Pier 86. The submarine is accessed exclusively through a series of narrow oval bulkhead doors and she can only fit roughly twenty guests at once. Due to restrictions created by fire codes, disabled visitors and individuals under forty inches tall cannot enter Growler.

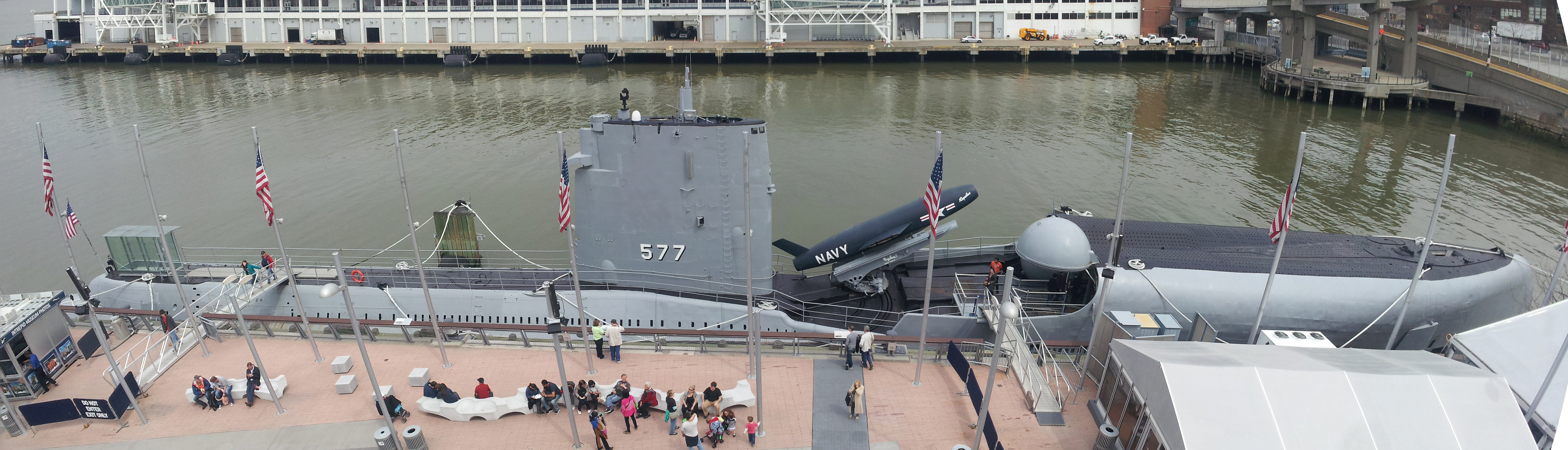
USS Growler (SSG-577), commissioned 1958

=== Spacecraft ===
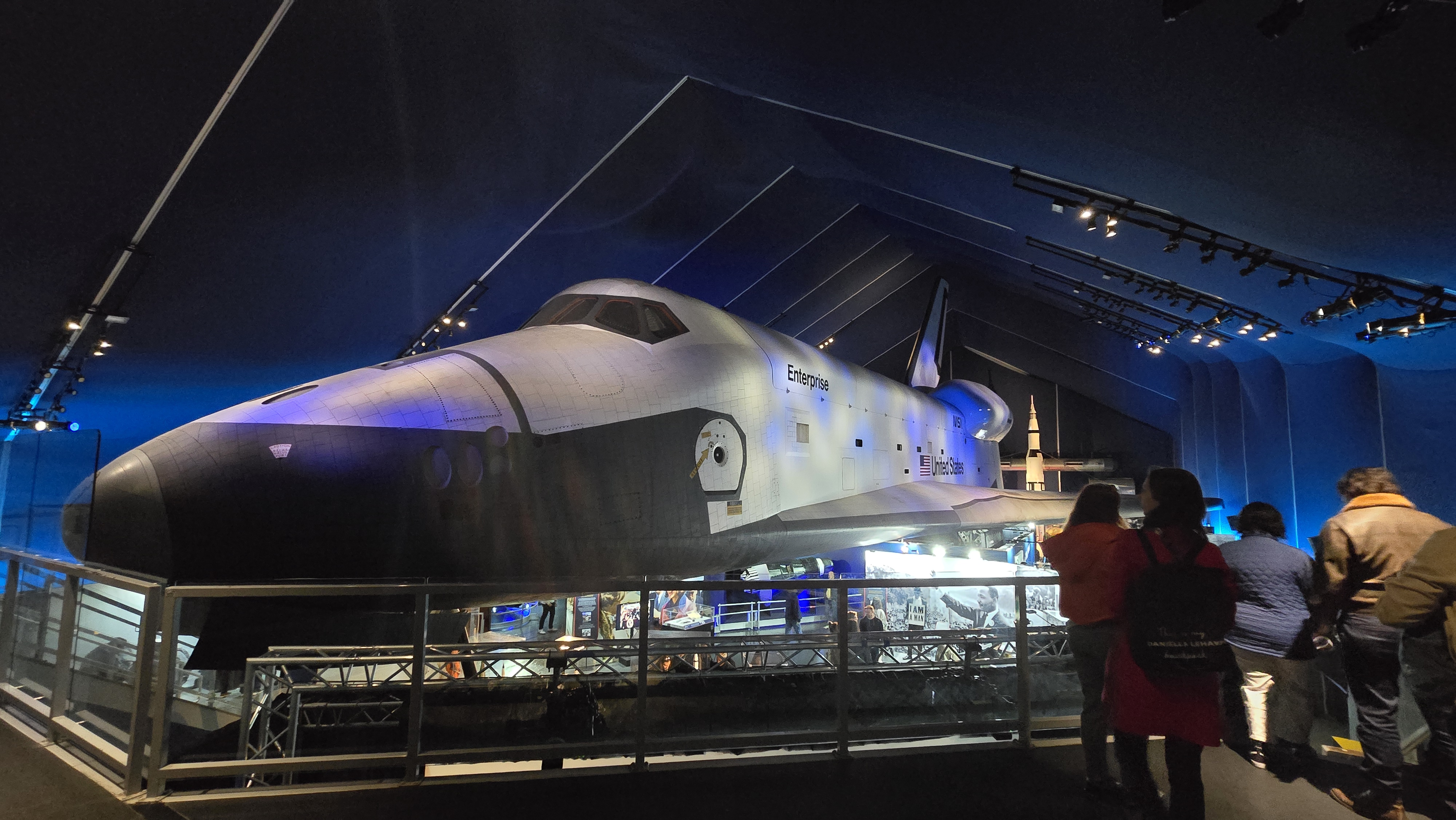
Space Shuttle Enterprise

The museum has two pieces of spacecraft from NASA. One of these is a replica of a NASA Aurora 7 Mercury capsule. The other is the Space Shuttle Enterprise, which was used as a test orbiter and is located within a pavilion on the flight deck. The museum also contains a Russian Soyuz descent module, which had docked with the International Space Station during the Soyuz TMA-6 mission.

=== Other exhibits ===
The museum has some individual objects in its collection. These include a ram air turbine, salvaged from an F-8 Crusader and restored, as well as a Curtiss Pusher on the hangar deck. The below-decks spaces contain several thousand artifacts, such as a helmet that belonged to an aviation machinist fighting in the Vietnam War. The New York Times estimated in 2016 that former Intrepid crew members and their families donated 10 objects to the museum every month. Artifacts donated by Intrepid crew members have included a Royal Navy uniform, gauge, dinner bell, and parachute-packing tool.

=== Temporary and former exhibits ===
The museum has hosted some attractions on a temporary basis; for example, the lightship Frying Pan (LV-115) was docked outside the museum during mid-1993. Many objects from the Intrepid Museum's collection were loaned from the Army and Navy. In the late 1990s, some of the craft were given back to their respective owners. Numerous other craft were relocated during that time, including the destroyer escort Slater and the lightship Nantucket (LV-112). The destroyer Edson was given back to the Navy in 2004. Additional objects were returned when the museum's renovation commenced in 2006, including a Saturn rocket loaned from the National Air and Space Museum. After the Enterprise was lifted onto the Intrepid's flight deck in 2012, a Douglas F3D Skyknight, a Royal Navy Supermarine Scimitar, and a MiG-15 were transferred to the Empire State Aerosciences Museum. Growler was also displayed next to Intrepid until 2004. The nose section of a former El Al Boeing 707, 4X-ATA, was put on display in 1985 after the airframe was retired and broken up. During the museum's renovations, it was sold to the Cradle of Aviation Museum in Uniondale, New York.

Pier 86 formerly contained a graffitied portion of the Berlin Wall, which was displayed temporarily during the 1990s and early 2000s. This segment of the Berlin Wall weighed 7,000 pounds (3,200 kg; 3.1 long tons) and was painted by German artist Kiddy Citny, who gave it to artist Peter Max. Felix de Weldon's 1954 sculpture Iwo Jima Monument (a smaller version of the Marine Corps War Memorial in Virginia), was installed outside the Intrepid Museum in 1995. The monument was removed after the Intrepid Museum closed for renovation in 2006, as the Intrepid Museum Foundation could not afford to buy the monument. A fiberglass model of the Statue of Liberty was given to the then-planned National September 11 Memorial & Museum when the Intrepid was renovated.

== Governance ==
The Intrepid Museum Foundation, a 501(c)(3) nonprofit organization established in 1979, operates the museum. As of 2023, Susan Marenoff is listed as the principal officer of the foundation. For the fiscal year that ended in December 2021, the organization recorded $23,304,017 in revenue and $23,432,181 in expenses. In addition to operating the museum, the Intrepid Museum Foundation is associated with programs such as the Intrepid Family Support Fund and the Intrepid Fallen Heroes Fund, and it distributes funds to families of US armed service members killed in action. The museum also employs some youth through internship programs. As part of the Free Fridays program, admission to the museum is typically waived on selected Fridays during the summer.

== Programming and events ==
=== Recurring events ===
The museum serves as an event space for community and national events. For example, it started hosting annual Fleet Week activities in 1988. It continues to host Fleet Week activities every year as of 2023. During past Fleet Weeks, Intrepid has hosted activities including tug-of-war, cooking, and arm wrestling contests, as well as a "Flight Deck Olympics" and exhibitions of ships. In addition, the Intrepid Museum has presented Kids' Week, a series of activities geared toward children. It held the New York Tugboat Race annually in the 1990s and early 2000s, with events such as line-throwing, nose-to-nose pushing, and spinach-eating contests. The museum has hosted sleepovers since 2009 as part of an event called Operation Slumber, and it also hosts Kids' Week events during late February.

The Intrepid Museum Foundation issues several awards each year. These include the Intrepid Freedom Award, for political leaders; the Intrepid Salute Award, for philanthropists and businesspeople; the Intrepid Salute Award for the Performing Arts, for performing-arts organizations; the Zachary & Elizabeth Fisher Award for Patriotism; the Intrepid Leadership Award, for community leaders; the Hometown Heroes Award, for residents of the New York metropolitan area who have contributed to the community; and the Intrepid Lifetime Achievement Award, for people who have helped others throughout their lifetime. Recipients of the awards have included U.S. presidents Ronald Reagan, George H. W. Bush, Bill Clinton, and George W. Bush; foreign heads of state; members of U.S. presidential cabinets; U.S. Congress members; and mayors of New York City,

=== Other events ===
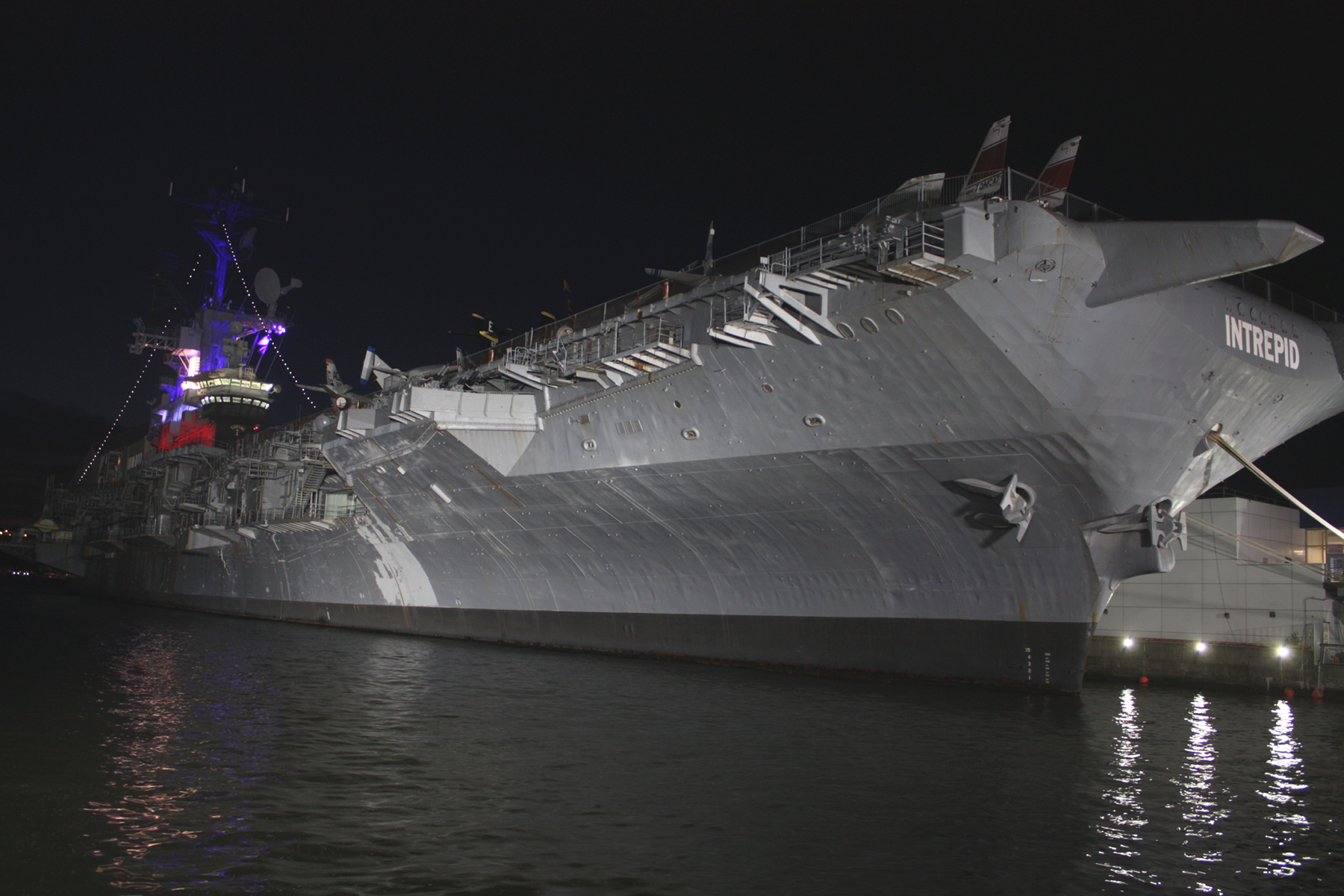
The Intrepid's superstructure and hull with lights at night

In the museum's first year, the Intrepid Museum Foundation hosted a party to celebrate the Intrepid's 40th anniversary. Starting in 1982, the Intrepid also hosted an annual benefit called Night to Remember, described by Naval History magazine as "a black-tie affair with thousands of couples dining and dancing to a swing band's music on the flight deck and disco tempos on the hangar deck". The Intrepid Museum Foundation, in conjunction with Radio City Music Hall Productions, also hosted concerts and other events on the nearby Pier 84 during the late 1980s. Other craft such as the battleship USS Iowa, also berthed outside Intrepid for special events in the 1980s. After the Gulf War started, the museum held events such as a tribute for the first New Yorker who died in the war, as well as a commemoration of the war's first anniversary. During the 1990s, the museum continued to host other events such as memorials, benefits, ceremonies, parties, and weddings. The museum's flight deck was temporarily converted to a 3,300-seat stadium during the 1998 Goodwill Games, when it hosted boxing and wrestling bouts.

A series of professional boxing matches commenced at the museum in 2001, one of which resulted in the death of fighter Beethaeven Scottland. The museum's flight deck was later used as a filming location for the 2004 movie National Treasure and the 2007 film I Am Legend. When the museum reopened in 2008, the New York Daily News estimated that the carrier hosted 150 events annually, ranging "from black-tie galas to bar mitzvahs, photos shoots and runway shows". It held concerts during the 2013 MLB All-Star Weekend and during Super Bowl XLVIII in 2014. In addition, the museum continued to host other events such as political fundraisers, film screenings, and social events like the "Battle of the Big Bands" party and Astronomy Night. The museum's operators have also rented out the flight deck and halls for weddings.

== See also ==
- List of aircraft carriers of the United States Navy
- List of maritime museums in the United States
- List of museum ships in North America
- List of museum ships of the United States military
- List of museums and cultural institutions in New York City
- U.S. Navy museums (and other aircraft carrier museums)
