= Donald R. Gardner =

United States Marine Corps general

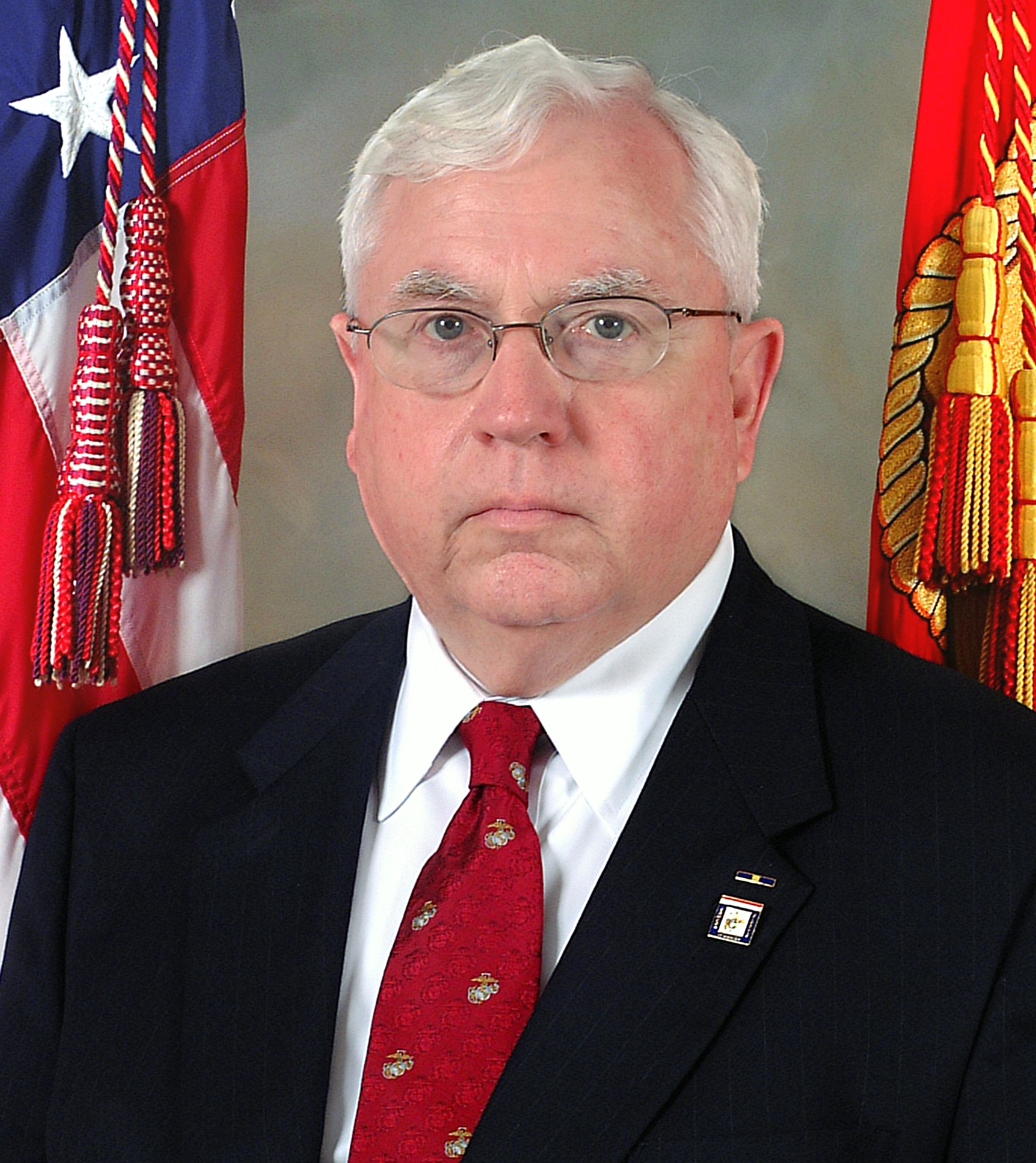
- MajGen Donald R. Gardner, USMC (retired)
- Military career
- Allegiance: United States of America
- Branch: United States Marine Corps
- Service years: 1955-1994
- Rank: Major General
- Commands: 3rd Battalion, 2nd Marines; Marine Corps Base Camp Lejeune; III Marine Expeditionary Force; Marine Corps Bases, Japan; 3rd Marine Division
- Conflicts: Vietnam War
- Awards: Distinguished Service Medal; Silver Star; Legion of Merit (2); Purple Heart
- Other work: Intrepid Sea-Air-Space Museum; Marine Corps University Foundation; Marine Corps University; Commonwealth of Virginia Veterans Services Foundation

Major General Donald R. Gardner is a retired United States Marine Corps officer and former president of the Marine Corps University.

== Education ==
Major General Gardner graduated from Memphis State University in 1960 with a Bachelor of Science degree in history and was a member of the Kappa Alpha Order. He also holds a Master of Arts degree in history from Memphis State University. He is a graduate of the Marine Corps Command and Staff College and a distinguished graduate of the Naval War College.

== Marine Corps career ==
Gardner enlisted in the U.S. Marine Corps Reserve in 1955, reaching the rank of sergeant. He was commissioned a second lieutenant in Reserves in 1960 after earning his bachelor's degree.

=== Command assignments ===
Major General Gardner's command assignments include: Platoon Commander, 2nd Battalion, 6th Marines (1961); Company Commander, 2nd Reconnaissance Battalion (1963); Company Commander, 3rd Reconnaissance Battalion (1966–67); Commanding Officer, 3rd Battalion, 2nd Marines (1977); Commanding General, Marine Corps Base Camp Lejeune, North Carolina (1988); Commanding General, III Marine Expeditionary Force and Commanding General, Marine Corps Bases, Japan (1992–94); Commanding General, 3rd Marine Division (Rein) (1993).

=== Staff assignments ===
Major General Gardner's staff assignments include: assistant S-3, 2nd Reconnaissance Battalion (1963); executive officer, Marine Barracks, Bermuda, British West Indies (1963–66); S-4, 3rd Reconnaissance Battalion (1966); Radio and television officer, Division of Information, HQMC, Washington, D.C. (1968); aide-de-Camp to the assistant commandant of the Marine Corps (1970–71); senior advisor to Tran Hung Dao 30 (1971); Marine officer instructor at Vanderbilt University, Nashville, Tennessee (1973–76); plans officer, 2nd Marine Division, Camp Lejeune, N.C (1978–79); deputy director, 1st Marine Corps District, Garden City, New York (1982); director of the 1st Marine Corps District (1984–86); assistant chief of staff, G-3, III Marine Amphibious Force, Okinawa, Laan (1986); assistant division commander, 2nd Marine Division, Camp Lejeune, N.C. (1987–88); deputy chief of staff for requirements and programs (1990).

=== Awards and decorations ===
Major General Gardner's military awards and personal decorations include:

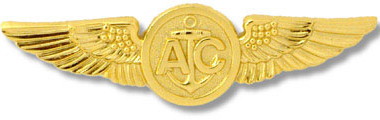

Naval Aircrew Badge
1st Row		Navy Distinguished Service Medal	Silver Star	
2nd Row	Legion of Merit w/ 1 award star & valor device	Purple Heart	Defense Meritorious Service Medal	Meritorious Service Medal w/ 1 award star
3rd Row	Air Medal w/ Strike/Flight numeral "2"	Joint Service Commendation Medal w/ valor device	Navy and Marine Corps Commendation Medal w/ valor device	Combat Action Ribbon
4th Row	Navy Presidential Unit Citation w/ 1 service star	Navy Unit Commendation w/ 1 service star	Navy Meritorious Unit Commendation w/ 2 service stars	Army Meritorious Unit Commendation
5th Row	Selected Marine Corps Reserve Medal w/ 1 service star	Marine Corps Expeditionary Medal	National Defense Service Medal w/ 1 service star	Armed Forces Expeditionary Medal
6th Row	Vietnam Service Medal w/ 6 service stars	Navy Sea Service Deployment Ribbon	Navy & Marine Corps Overseas Service Ribbon	Vietnam Gallantry Cross w/ silver star
7th Row	Order of the Rising Sun, 3rd class	Vietnam Gallantry Cross unit citation	Vietnam Civil Actions unit citation	Vietnam Campaign Medal

Foreign Awards

- General Gardner was presented the Order of the Rising Sun, Third Class, by the Emperor of Japan for his dedicated service to the security of Japan and the mutual cooperation between Japan and the United States.

== Post Marine Corps career ==
Gardner retired from the U.S. Marine Corps in 1994. From 1996 to 1999, he was president and chief executive officer of the Intrepid Sea-Air-Space Museum in New York City. From 1999 to 2004, he was chief executive officer for the Marine Corps University Foundation. On May 21, 2004, he was selected to fulfill the duties of president, Marine Corps University, becoming the first civilian to hold the post He retired from that position on June 25, 2009. The guest speaker at his retirement was GEN James T. Conway, Commandant of the Marine Corps, who referred to him as "the last Confederate general still on active duty" due to his research on America's Civil War. Prior to assuming duties as president, MCU, Major General Gardner had been on the Commonwealth of Virginia's Veterans Services Foundation. He could not maintain a position as a member of the Veterans Services Foundation, due to federal regulations.
