= New York Tugboat Race =

Tugboat Race

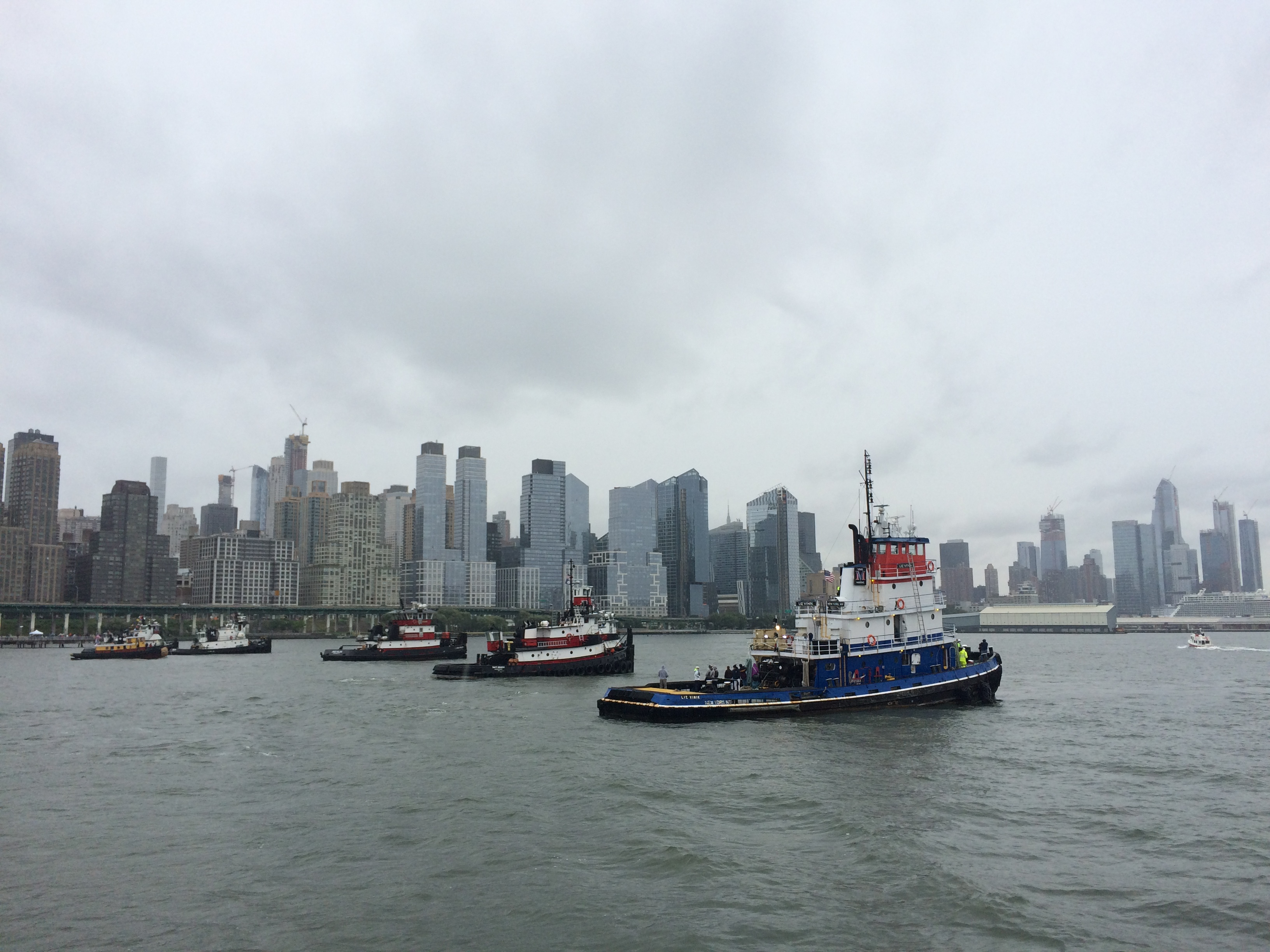
The tugboats line-up as they prepare for the 2018 New York Tugboat Race

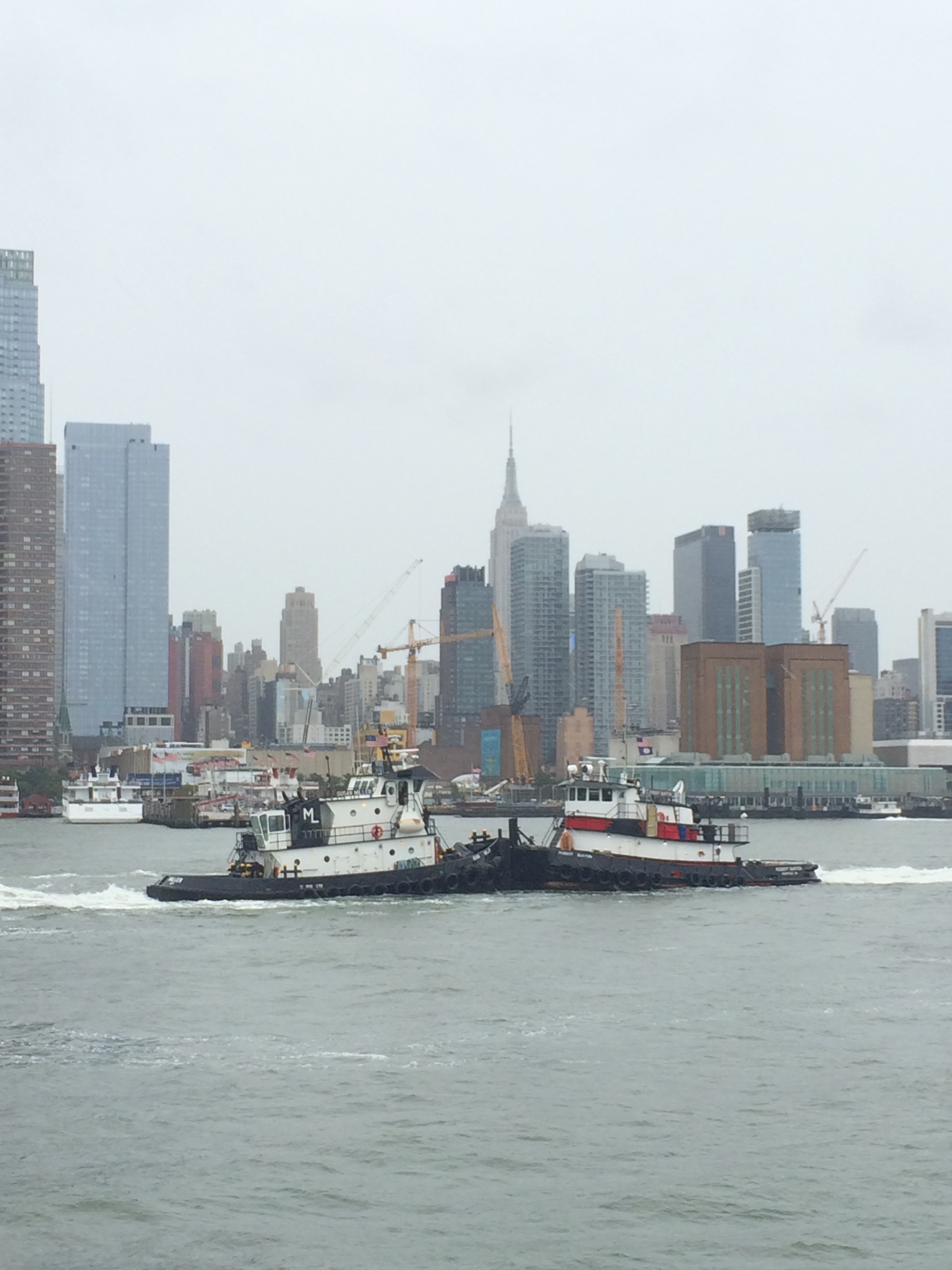
Following the race, the tugboats engage in a pushing competition

The New York Tugboat Race is a contest for working tugboats held on the Hudson River every Fall on the Sunday before Labor Day. It was founded in part by Captain Jerry Roberts, who also serves as its chief announcer. Boats race one nautical mile from 79th Street to Pier 84 at 44th Street in Manhattan. The race is the occasion for a dockside festival.[1] Events currently include nose-to-nose pushing competitions, a line toss competition, and best mascot/costume contests between the crews. After the award, the spectators of the race can compete in events that include a knot tying competition, an on land line toss competition and a spinach eating competition. The spinach eating competition is in honor of the Popeye the sailor cartoon character. Spectators can also pay to get a seat on a tug boat during the events.

Similar contests are held on the Detroit River and the St. Mary's River.

== History ==
The Great North River Tug Boat Race and Competition, or as it is more commonly known the New York Tug Boat Race or the Hudson River Tugboat Race, was first held in 1991. The event put on by the Intrepid Sea, Air & Space Museum and headed by Captain Jerry Roberts. The original course started 79th Street Boat Basin and ended at Pier 86 or as it is also known the Intrepid Pier. The Intrepid Museum held the event for its first 13 years. Captain Jerry Roberts left the Intrepid Museum staff after the 2004 event.

- In 2005 the event was held by Captain Jerry Roberts himself with help from the National Light House Museum and The Working Harbor Committee (WHC). There was also a steering committee made up of Captain Jerry Roberts, Bert Reinauer of Reinauer Transport, John Doswell of (WHC), and Chris Roehrig of Roehrig Maritime. This event was held on Staten Island instead of its previous location near Manhattan. A barge was provided for the awards ceremony as well as the line tossing competition. For several reasons including lack of a facility for spectators to watch the event it was not held on Staten Island again. The event returned closer to its original location on the North River.
- In 2006 the location for the event was held at pier 63 Maritime. This location was superior to Staten Island for the fact that it had a good view for spectators. Unfortunately there were few places to tie the Tugboats. A barge was again provided for the line tossing competition and the awards ceremony. The barge also served as a place for tugs to tie up. The owner of pier 63 Maritime, John Krevey provided free food and drinks for the tugboat crew. However there were issues of the new location. The large amount of wake created by the event was deemed unsuitable by the neighboring Chelsea Piers. The lack of proper places for the tugboats to tie up to was also deemed a problem.
- In 2007 the event once again changed locations. The event would more closely follow to the original course, starting from the 79th Street Boat Basin but instead would end at Pier 84. The event itself was held at Pier 84, just south of Pier 86. It was chosen for both its large amount of room for tug boats to tie up to and large space for the spectators to watch. The large Pier is now used as a park which is perfect for the spectators due to its space and easily available food and bathroom. This location would become the permanent location for the event.
- In 2008 friendly competition for the spectators were added to the event. These include a knot tying competition, a line tossing competition on the pier and a spinach eating competition. There was also musical entertainment provided.

Sponsors, co-sponsors and contributors to the event have included Hudson River Park Trust, Friends of Hudson River Park, New York City Department of Environmental Protection, Circle Line Sightseeing Cruises, NYC Economic Development Corporation, Reinauer Transportation, McAllister Towing, Miller’s Tugs & Barge, Kirby Offshore Marine Metropolitan Marine Transportation, Bren Transportation, Vane Brothers, P.D. O’Hurleys, Intrepid Sea, Air & Space Museum, United States Coast Guard, United States Coast Guard Auxiliary, Raritan Riverkeeper, New York City Fire Department, United States Army Corps of Engineers, Allens Inc – Popeye Spinach, Whole Foods Market, South Street Seaport Museum, David Cunningham, architect, West 44th Street Block Association, Floating the Apple, Meg Black (WHC) Program Director, Capt. Steve Bendo, Capt. Maggie Flanagan, Nelson Chin, Mike Abegg, Lee Miller, Jean Preece.

== Race results ==
2012
| Tug | Company | Hp | Time | Trophy |
|---|---|---|---|---|
| Lincoln Sea | Kirby Offshore Marine | 8,000 | 5:01 | div A first |
| Meagan Ann | Donjon Marine | 2,200 | 5:27 | div B first |
| Weddell Sea | Kirby Offshore Marine | 5,000 | 5:41 | div A second |
| Maurania III | McAllister Towing | 4,000 | 5:47 | div A third |
| Quantico Creek | Vane Brothers | 3,000 | 6:15 | div A fourth |
| Freddie K. Miller | Miller’s Launch | 2,000 | 6:37 | div B second |
| Buchanan 12 | Buchanan Marine | 3,500 | 7:01 | div A fifth |
| Little Toot | Private | 700 | 7:15 | div C first |
| Deborah Miller | Miller Long Island | 2,060 | 7:19 | div B third |
| Gage Paul Thornton | Thornton | 1,000 | 8:14 | div B third |
| Catherine C. Miller | Miller’s Launch | 1.02 | 8:20 | div C third |
| Buchanan 1 | Buchanan Marine | 2,200 | 8:54 | div B fourth |
| Susan Miller | Miller’s Launch | 1,500 | 8:56 | div B fifth |
| Growler | U.S. Merchant Marine Academy | 400 | 9:04 | div D first |
| Vulcan III | Derrick Marine | 500 | 9:15 | div D second |
| Pegasus (1907) | Private | 900 | 10:19 | div C fourth |
| Thornton Brothers | Thornton | 1,800 | 10:52 | div B sixth |
| Lt. Michael P. Murphy | Private | 180 | 12:10 | div D third |
| Shawn Miller | Miller's Launch | 600 | 12:18 | div D fourth |
| The Bronx | Private | 220 | 12:48 | div D fifth |
| W.O. Decker | South Street Seaport Museum | 285 | n/a | Did Not Race |

2011
| Tug | Company | Hp | Time | Trophy |
|---|---|---|---|---|
| Maurania III | McAllister Towing | 4,000 | 5:09 | div A first |
| Cornell | Lehigh Valley | 1,800 | 5:15 | div A second (tie) |
| Meagan Ann | Donjon Marine | 2,000 | 5:15 | div A second (tie) |
| Cheyenne | Donjon Marine | 1,800 | 5:25 | div A third |
| Atlantic | Donjon Marine | 7,200 | 5:55 | div A fourth |
| Catherine Miller | Miller’s Launch | 1,200 | 6:23 | div B first |
| Susan Miller | Miller’s Launch | 1,500 | 6:36 | div B second |
| Sea Wolf | Wolf Marine | 1,400 | 6:49 | div B third |
| Mary H | Bren Transportation | 900 | 6:52 | div B fourth |
| Vulcan | Derrick Marine | 500 | 6:56 | div C one |
| W. O. Decker | Seaport Museum | 285 | 7:31 | div C second |
| The Bronx | Robert & Lucy Apuzzo | 220 | 7:40 | div C third |
| Shawn Miller | Miller’s Launch | 600 | 8:29 | div C fourth |
| Lt. Michael Murphy | Scott Koen | 180 | 8:39 | div C fifth |

2010
| Tug | Company | Hp | Time | Trophy |
|---|---|---|---|---|
| Maurania III | McAllister Towing | 4,000 | 5:09 | div A first |
| Cornell | Lehigh Valley | 1,800 | 5:15 | div A second (tie) |
| Meagan Ann | Donjon Marine | 2,000 | 5:15 | div A second (tie) |
| Cheyenne | Donjon Marine | 1,800 | 5:25 | div A third |
| Atlantic | Donjon Marine | 7,200 | 5:55 | div A fourth |
| Catherine Miller | Miller’s Launch | 1,200 | 6:23 | div B first |
| Susan Miller | Miller’s Launch | 1,500 | 6:36 | div B second |
| Sea Wolf | Wolf Marine | 1,400 | 6:49 | div B third |
| Mary H | Bren Transportation | 900 | 6:52 | div B fourth |
| Vulcan | Derrick Marine | 500 | 6:56 | div C one |
| W. O. Decker | Seaport Museum | 285 | 7:31 | div C second |
| The Bronx | Robert & Lucy Apuzzo | 220 | 7:40 | div C third |
| Shawn Miller | Miller’s Launch | 600 | 8:29 | div C fourth |
| Lt. Michael Murphy | Scott Koen | 180 | 8:39 | div C fifth |

2009
| Tug | Company | Hp | Time | Trophy |
|---|---|---|---|---|
| Ellen McAllister | McAllister | 3,200 | 6:17 | div A first |
| Nathan Stewart | K-Sea | 3,200 | 6:26 | div A second |
| Cornell | Lehigh Valley | 1,800 | 6:33 | div B first |
| Meagan Ann | Donjon | 2,200 | 6:40 | div A third |
| Susan Miller | Miller’s Launch | 1,500 | 7:57 | div B second |
| Catherine Miller | Miller’s Launch | 1,200 | 7:59 | div B third |
| Pegasus | Metro Marine | 1,900 | 8:22 | div B |
| Urger | NYS Canal Corp | 340 | 8:59 | div C first |
| Growler | U.S. Merchant Marine Academy | 400 | 9:01 | div C second |
| Shawn Miller | Miller’s Launch | 600 | 10:59 | div C third |
| Lt. Michael Murphy | Scott Koen | 180 | 11:42 | div C |
| Gabby Miller | Miller’s Launch | 400 | n/a | Did not race |

== See also ==
- Tugboats in New York City
