= USS Thomas A. Edison =

Submarine of the United States

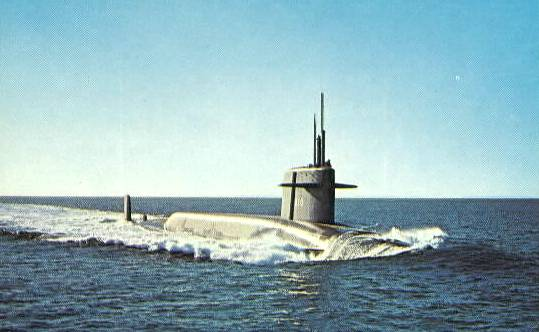
- USS Thomas A. Edison (SSBN-610)

History

United States
- Name: USS Thomas A. Edison
- Namesake: Thomas Edison (1847–1931)
- Ordered: 1 July 1959
- Builder: Electric Boat Division of the General Dynamics Corporation
- Laid down: 15 March 1960
- Launched: 15 June 1961
- Sponsored by: Mrs. Madeleine Edison Sloane
- Commissioned: 10 March 1962
- Decommissioned: 1 December 1983
- Stricken: 30 April 1986
- Motto: Potentia Tenebras Repellendi; (Power to Repel the Darkness)
- Fate: Recycling via Ship and Submarine Recycling Program completed 1 December 1997

General characteristics
- Class & type: Ethan Allen-class submarine
- Type: Ballistic Missile Submarine
- Displacement: 6,900 tons surfaced 7,900 tons submerged
- Length: 410 feet 4 inches (125.07 m)
- Beam: 33.1 feet (10.1 m)
- Draft: 27 feet 5 inches (8.36 m)
- Propulsion: S5W reactor – two geared steam turbines – one shaft
- Speed: 16 knots (30 km/h; 18 mph) surfaced, 21 knots (39 km/h; 24 mph) submerged
- Test depth: 1,300 feet (400 m)
- Complement: 12 Officers and 128 Enlisted (two crews Blue and Gold)
- Armament: 16 fleet ballistic missiles, 4 × 21 inch (533 mm) torpedo tubes

USS Thomas A. Edison (SSBN-610), an Ethan Allen-class nuclear-powered ballistic missile submarine, was the second ship of the United States Navy to be named for the inventor Thomas Edison (1847–1931).

== Construction and commissioning ==
Thomas A. Edison's keel was laid down on 15 March 1960 by the Electric Boat Division of the General Dynamics Corporation of Groton, Connecticut. She was launched on 15 June 1961, sponsored by Mrs. Madeleine Edison Sloane, daughter of Thomas Edison and Mina Miller and wife of John Eyre Sloane, and commissioned on 10 March 1962 with Captain Charles M. Young commanding the Blue Crew and Captain Walter Dedrick commanding the Gold Crew.

== Service history ==
On 9 April 1962, during shakedown training off the eastern coast of the United States, Thomas A. Edison collided with the destroyer USS Wadleigh (DD-689).

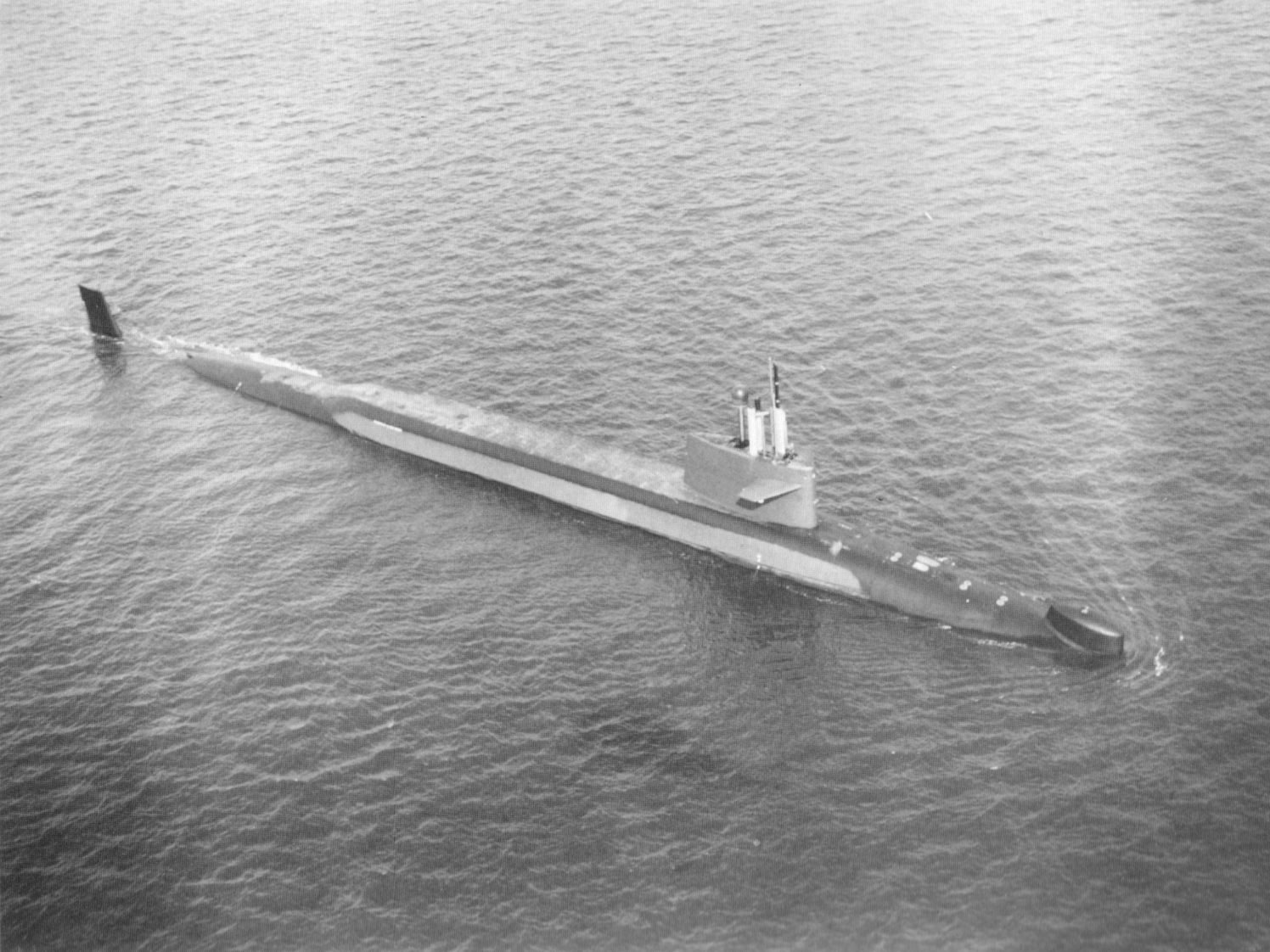
Thomas A. Edison underway in the Atlantic Ocean in 1962.

Thomas A. Edison loaded sixteen Polaris A2 missiles, which had a range of a range of 1500 nm (1725 miles) and carried a single nuclear warhead on each missile, at the naval base in Charleston, South Carolina, and embarked upon her first deterrent patrol on 7 November 1962. She was part of the eight United States nuclear-powered ballistic missile submarines which participated in the Cuban Missile Crisis as part of the United States nuclear order of battle from October to November 1962. (Note: From 16 October – 20 November 1962, the eight United States Polaris submarines that participated as part of the United States nuclear order of battle during the Cuban Missile Crisis were USS George Washington (SSBN 598) with Polaris A1, USS Patrick Henry (SSBN 599) with Polaris A1, USS Robert E. Lee (SSBN 601) with Polaris A1, USS Theodore Roosevelt (SSBN 600) with Polaris A1, USS Abraham Lincoln (SSBN 602) with Polaris A1, USS Ethan Allen (SSBN 608) with Polaris A2, USS Sam Houston (SSBN 609) with Polaris A2 which departed Charleston, South Carolina on 10 October 1962, and USS Thomas A. Edison (SSBN 610) with Polaris A2 which departed Charleston, South Carolina, on 7 November 1962. The first five were George Washington-class submarines and the last three were Ethan Allen-class submarines and all carried 16 ballistic missiles with each missile carrying a single nuclear warhead.) During Edison's load out in Charleston at 1900 on 22 October 1962, DEFCON 3 was ordered for the Poliaris submarines on patrol. At DEFCON 3, "Polaris submarines moved to their launch points." She concluded that patrol at the base at Holy Loch, Scotland, from which she operated for the next four years and conducted 17 deterrent patrols. In September 1966, her official home port was changed from New London, Connecticut, to Charleston, South Carolina, in preparation for her first major overhaul. She ended her 17th patrol at Charleston on 15 October 1966 and began her overhaul on 28 October 1966. She completed repairs on 9 May 1968; and, after post-overhaul sea trials and shakedown, she embarked upon her 18th deterrent patrol on 22 September 1968.

After a shortened 19th patrol, she conducted a "Follow on Target" (FOT) test launch. For this test, four missiles were selected at random, their warheads were removed, and telemetry packages were fitted in place of the warheads. Thomas A. Edison then proceeded to a location just off the Canary Islands and fired these missiles into the Caribbean. Due to the accuracy and timeliness of these successful launches, the members of that Blue Crew were awarded a Meritorious Unit Citation.

Through June 1973, Thomas A. Edison operated out of New London and Rota, Spain, from which ports she conducted another 19 deterrent patrols in the Mediterranean Sea.

In June 1973, she was transferred to the United States Pacific Fleet, arriving in San Diego, on 11 July 1973. After a short period of operations with Submarine Group 5, she moved to Vallejo, California, on 6 August 1973 to begin another overhaul, this time at the Mare Island Naval Shipyard at Vallejo, California. On 30 November 1974, she completed repairs and, following shakedown in January and February 1975, she transited the Panama Canal again in March 1975 to fire test missiles near Cape Canaveral, Florida. She concluded that mission in July and retransited the Canal on 8 August 1975. Thomas A. Edison carried out operations along the United States West Coast until December 1975, at which time she headed for her new home port, Apra, Guam.

On 6 October 1980, Thomas A. Edison completed her final deterrent patrol and was reclassified an attack submarine, given hull number SSN-610. In 1981, in compliance with the SALT I treaty, Thomas A. Edison's missile section was deactivated. Concrete blocks were placed in the missile tubes, and the missile fire-control system and one of the ship's inertial navigation systems were removed. She was retained primarily for training, ASW antisubmarine warfare exercises, and other secondary duties.

In August 1982 Thomas A. Edison conducted the first Western Pacific deployment by an ex-SSBN. During deployment, her crew enjoyed visits to Japan, Korea, Thailand and the Philippines. On 29 November 1982, 40 miles (64 km) east of Subic Bay, Philippines, Thomas A. Edison collided with USS Leftwich (DD-984) while conducting ASW exercises. Thomas A. Edison was at periscope depth. Her sail and sail planes were damaged, but there was no flooding apart from a minor leak down the periscope well. After the collision the boat never submerged again. She went to Polaris Point, Guam, for temporary repairs, then made a 35-day transit across the Pacific on the surface to Bremerton, Washington, where she had home ported as an SSN.

The original plan for Thomas A. Edison, after some preliminary testing in the Philippines, was for her to become the test platform for the Seal Delivery system, as Thomas A. Edison was in the best material shape of the Ethan Allen-class boats, so she was chosen for this mission. The Navy had planned to decommission the USS Ethan Allen (SSBN-608) or USS Sam Houston (SSBN-609), but after the collision it was decided to decommission Thomas A. Edison instead. In January 1983, Thomas A. Edison entered the Puget Sound Naval Shipyard for inactivation.

Decommissioned on 1 December 1983, Thomas A. Edison was struck from the Naval Vessel Register on 30 April 1986. She went through the Navy's Nuclear Powered Ship and Submarine Recycling Program at Puget Sound Naval Shipyard, Bremerton, Washington, beginning on 1 October 1996 and on 1 December 1997 ceased to exist as the recycling was completed.

== Elevator ==
Thomas A. Edison was the first and only submarine to have an elevator. In 1962, an elevator was added to Thomas A. Edison so that President Kennedy could access the submarine. President Kennedy had a back injury which prevented him from using vertical ladders. The addition was known as the JFK Submarine Access Elevator and allowed the President to enter the submarine through one of its deck hatches while standing. On 13 April 1962, President Kennedy and his naval aide to the president, Captain Tazewell Shepard, Jr., toured the recently commissioned submarine while it was at the naval base in Norfolk, Virginia. As of February 2022, the elevator is located at the USS Nautilus Museum along the Thames River in Groton, Connecticut.

== Steinway piano ==
During the construction of Thomas A. Edison, the commissioning captain, Charles M. "Cy" Young, purchased a Steinway piano that was placed aboard before the hull was sealed. This piano remained on board the submarine for 22 years (1961–1983) up until her decommissioning. The Steinway piano is the only example of a full-sized piano ever installed on a U.S. submarine conducting nuclear deterrent patrols.
