= Dry deck shelter =

Removable submarine module

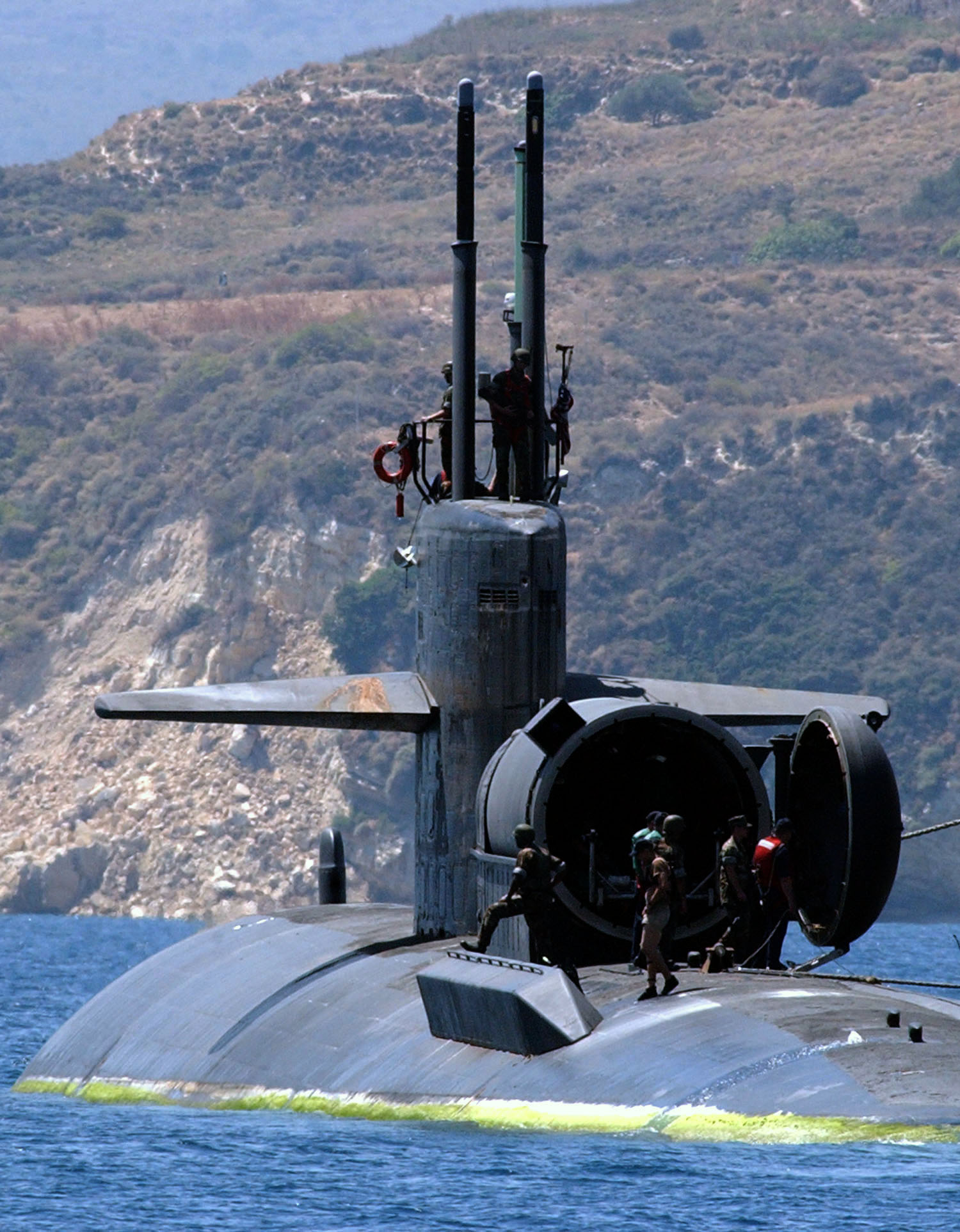
USS Dallas (SSN-700) departs Souda Bay harbor with dry deck shelter attached in 2004.

A dry deck shelter (DDS) is a removable module that can be attached to a submarine to allow divers easy exit and entrance while the boat is submerged. The host submarine must be specially modified to accommodate the shelter, with the appropriate mating hatch configuration, electrical connections, and piping for ventilation, divers' air, and draining water. The shelter can be used to deploy SEAL Delivery Vehicle submersibles, Navy divers, or Combat Rubber Raiding Craft.

== Active and future DDS-capable submarines ==
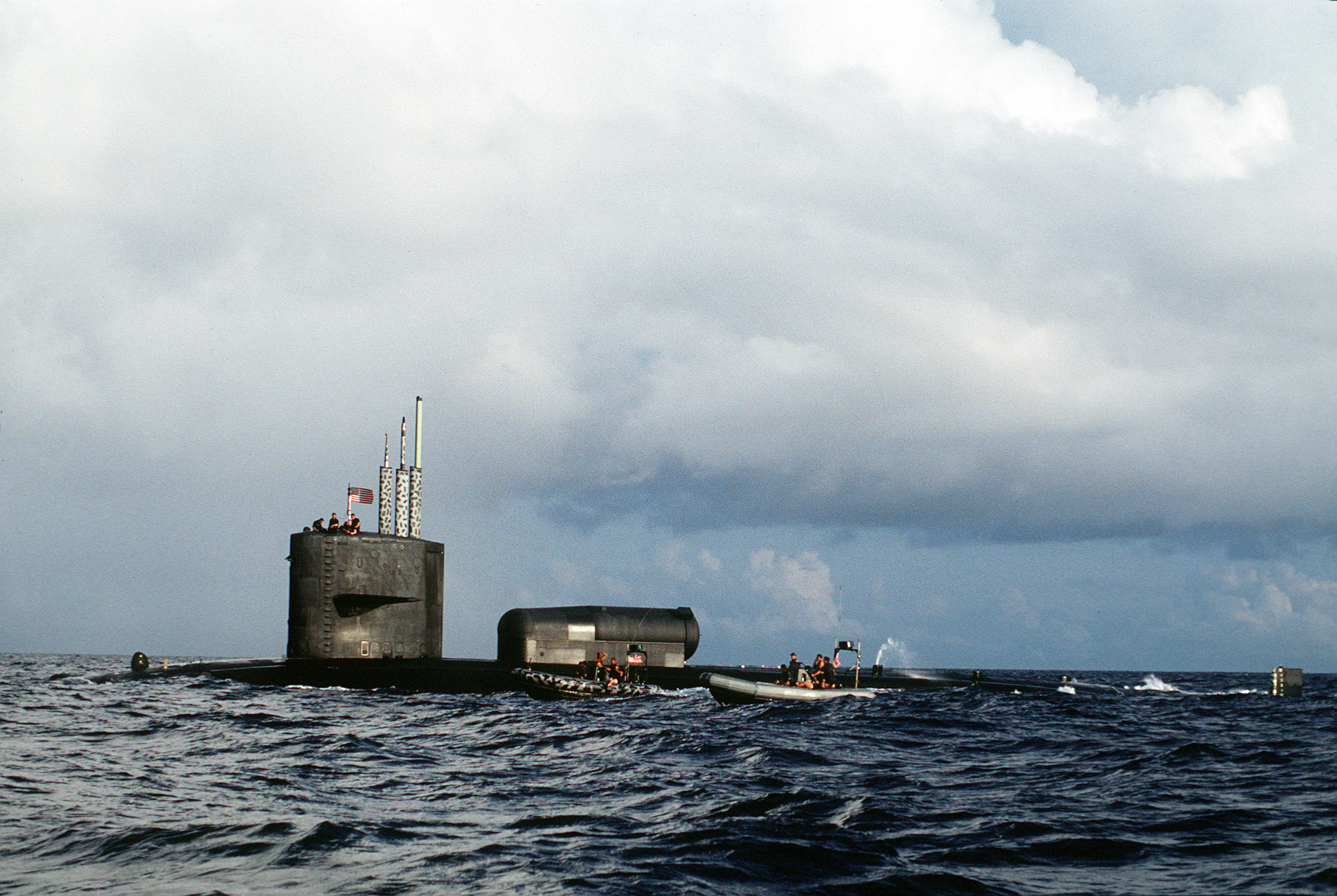
A pair of rigid-hulled inflatable boats operate alongside USS Archerfish during a 1993 exercise. Archerfish has a dry deck shelter attached to its deck.

=== Royal Navy ===
British dry deck shelters are formally known as Special Forces Payload Bays and were procured under "Project Chalfont". Training is conducted at the purpose-built Chalfont Shore Facility, constructed by BAE Systems at HM Naval Base Clyde. It is used by the Astute-class submarine.

=== United States Navy ===
The United States Navy's dry deck shelters are 38 feet (12 m) long and 9 feet (2.7 m) high and wide, add about 30 tons to the host submarine's submerged displacement, can be transported by trucks or C-5 Galaxy airplanes, and require one to three days to install and test. They have three HY-80 steel sections within the outer glass-reinforced plastic fairing: a spherical hyperbaric chamber at the forward end to treat injured divers; a smaller spherical transfer trunk; and a cylindrical hangar with elliptical ends. The hangar can support a SEAL Delivery Vehicle with a crew of six Navy SEALs, and a crew of Navy divers to operate the shelter and launch the Delivery Vehicle; or 20 SEALs with four Combat Rubber Raiding Craft. The SDV release team consists of 2 officers, 2 enlisted technicians, and 18 divers.

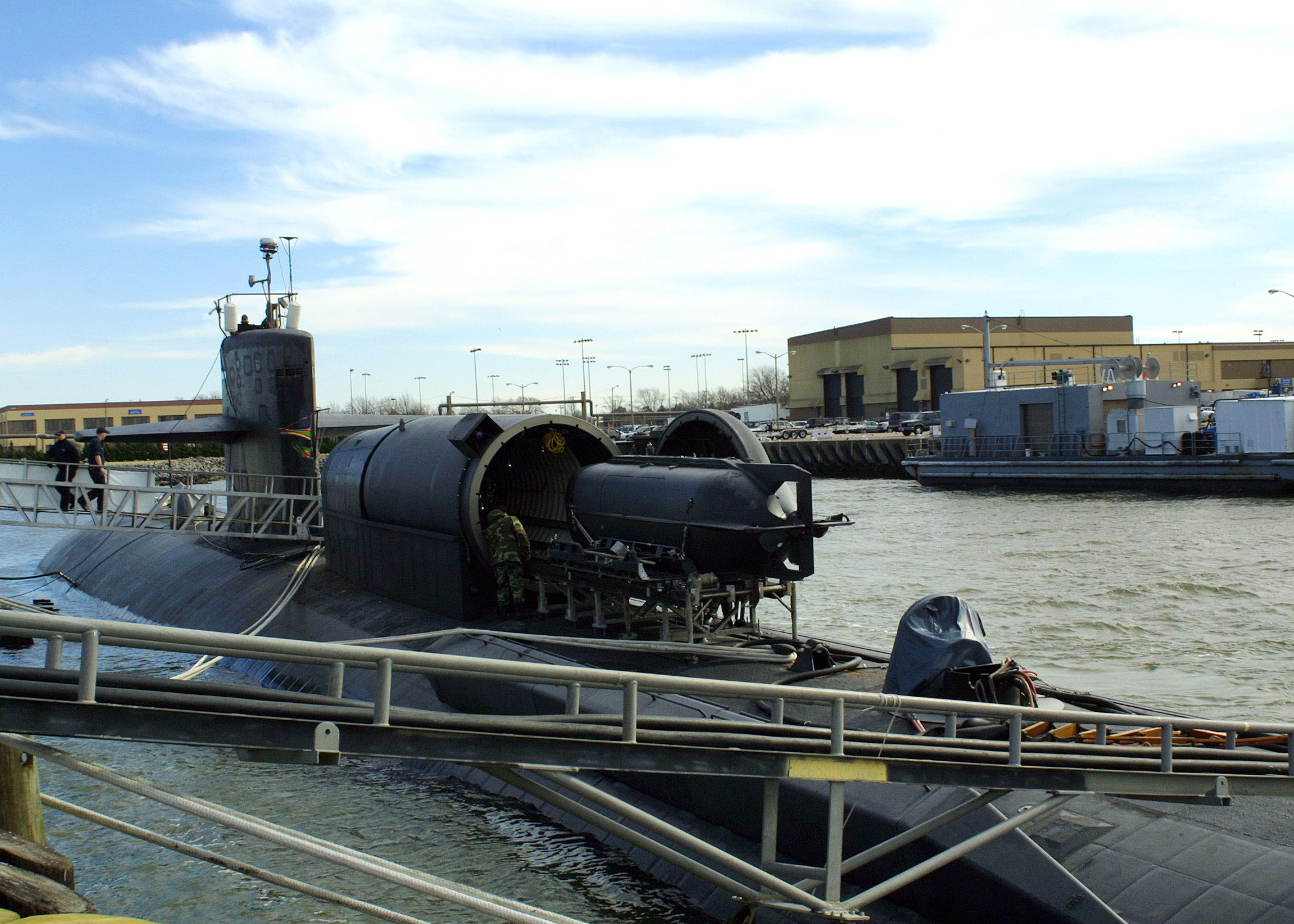
A SEAL Delivery Vehicle is loaded aboard the dry deck shelter on the Los Angeles-class fast attack submarine USS Dallas

The two SEAL delivery vehicle teams report to Naval Special Warfare Group 3.

There are currently six portable dry deck shelters in use by the US Navy, the first one built by Electric Boat. The first, designated DDS-01S ("S" for starboard opening outer door), was completed in 1982. The remaining five, DDS-02P ("P" for port opening), -03P, -04S, -05S, and -06P, were built between 1987 by Newport News Shipbuilding. The shelters are maintained by a combined effort of Navy divers stationed on the teams and workers of the maintenance company Oceaneering International. They have expected useful lives of about 40 years each.

The first submarine to have an operational dry deck shelter was the USS Cavalla, which was fitted with the shelter in 1982 and first deployed with it in 1983. It is deployed on the Virginia-class submarine, the Los Angeles-class submarine, the Seawolf-class submarine:, and the Ohio-class submarine. The Ohio-class SSGNs are capable of supporting dual dry deck shelters.

=== French Navy (Marine nationale) ===
The French Navy's Suffren class of nuclear attack submarines, designed by the French shipbuilder Naval Group, integrate a removable dry deck shelter. It can deploy a dozen combat swimmers and embark the new PSM3G swimmer delivery vehicle.

== Former DDS-capable submarines ==
Former US Navy DDS-capable submarines include:

Ethan Allen-class submarine:

- USS John Marshall
- USS Sam Houston

Sturgeon-class submarine:

- USS Silversides
- USS Archerfish
- USS L. Mendel Rivers
- USS Cavalla
- USS Tunny
- USS William H. Bates

Benjamin Franklin-class submarine:

- USS Kamehameha
- USS James K. Polk

Note: The Benjamin Franklin-class special operations attack submarines were capable of supporting dual dry deck shelters.

Five Permit-class submarines were also fitted to carry the DDS.
