= USS Dallas (SSN-700) =

Los Angeles-class nuclear-powered attack submarine of the US Navy

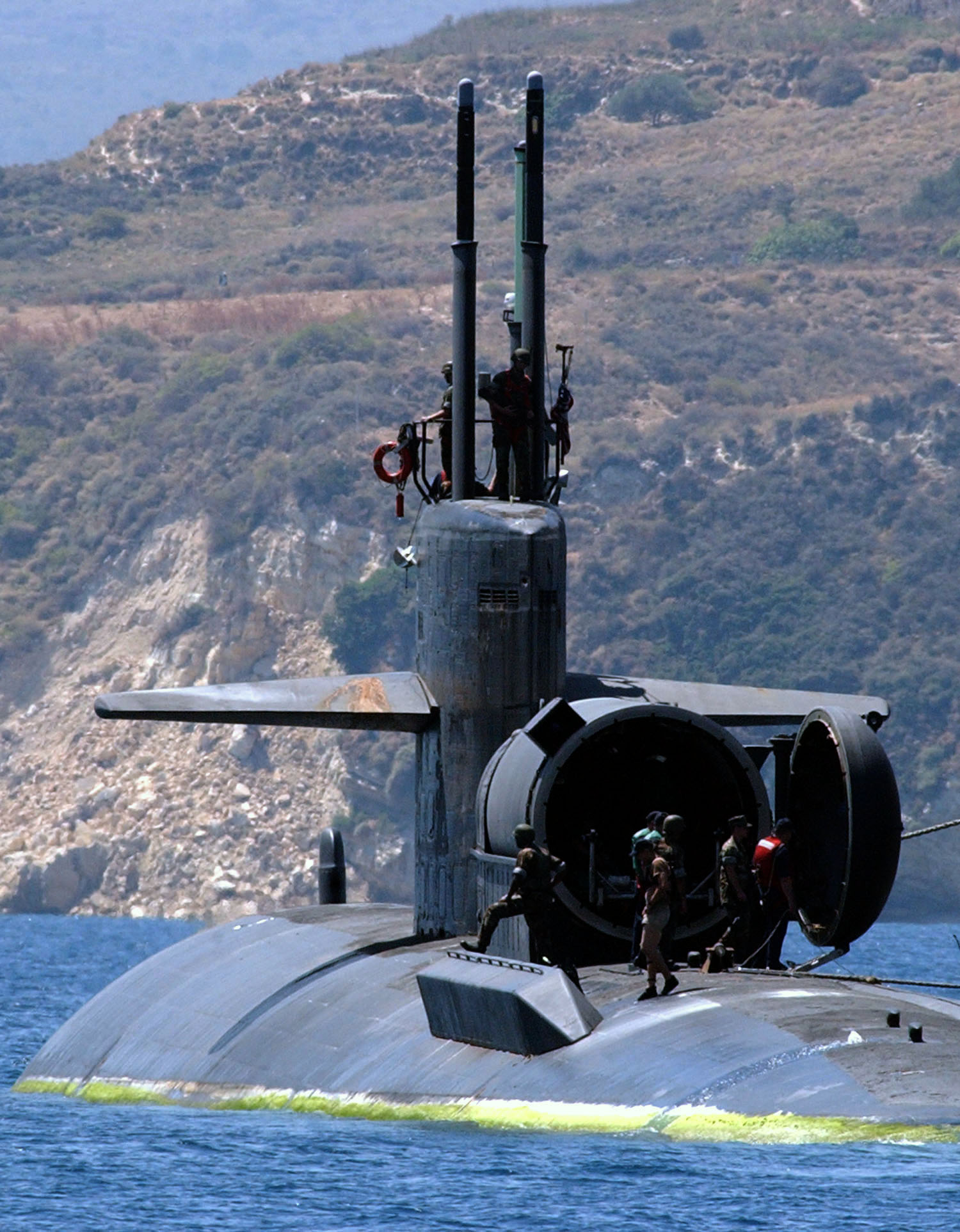
- Dallas carrying a Dry Deck Shelter in 2004.

History

United States
- Name: USS Dallas
- Namesake: Dallas, Texas
- Awarded: 31 January 1973
- Builder: General Dynamics Corporation
- Laid down: 9 October 1976
- Launched: 28 April 1979
- Commissioned: 18 July 1981
- Decommissioned: 4 April 2018
- Out of service: 22 May 2017
- Stricken: 4 April 2018
- Home port: Groton, Connecticut
- Motto: First in Harm's Way
- Nickname(s): Big D
- Status: Stricken, pending final disposal
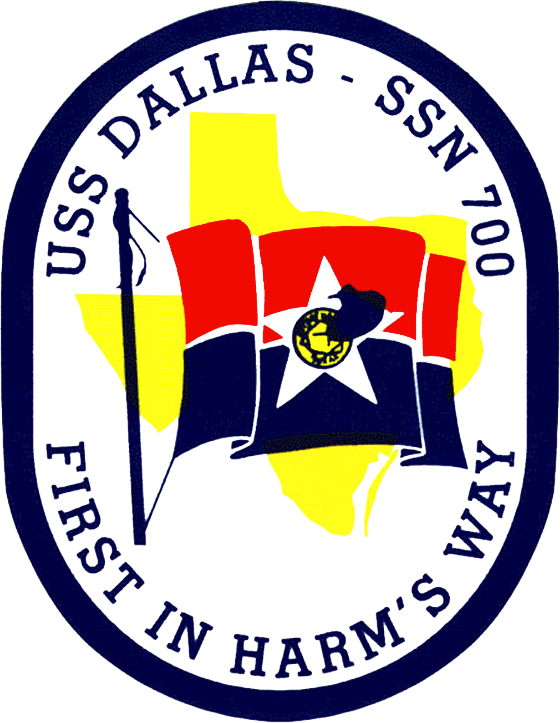
- Badge

General characteristics
- Class & type: Los Angeles-class submarine
- Displacement: 6,900 tons
- Length: 110.3 m (361 ft 11 in)
- Beam: 10 m (32 ft 10 in)
- Draft: 9.4 m (30 ft 10 in)
- Propulsion: S6G nuclear reactor
- Complement: 127
- Armament: 4 × 21 in (533 mm) torpedo tubes

USS Dallas (SSN-700) was a Los Angeles-class nuclear-powered attack submarine of the United States Navy. She was the Navy's second vessel of that name, and the first to be named after the city of Dallas, Texas. The first Dallas, a destroyer, was named for 19th-century US Naval officer Captain Alexander Dallas. Another two ships with the name were scheduled but never completed. On 4 April 2018, after nearly 37 years of commissioned service, the boat was decommissioned at the Controlled Industrial Area of Puget Sound Naval Shipyard. The defueled vessel eventually will undergo recycling.

== Service history ==
The contract to build Dallas was awarded to the Electric Boat Division of General Dynamics Corporation in Groton, Connecticut, on 31 October 1973, and her keel was laid down on 9 October 1976. She was launched on 28 April 1979, sponsored by Mrs. Rita Crocker Clements, wife of former Deputy Secretary of Defense Bill Clements, and commissioned on 18 July 1981. Dallas was the first submarine of the Los Angeles class to be originally built with an all-digital fire-control (tracking and weapon) system and sonar system. After commissioning, Dallas was attached to Submarine Development Squadron 12 in New London, Connecticut, where she was involved in research-and-development projects.

On 27 August 1981 Dallas damaged her lower rudder when she ran aground while approaching the Atlantic Undersea Test and Evaluation Center site at Andros Island, Bahamas. The submarine worked herself free after several hours and returned on the surface to New London, Connecticut, for repairs.

From September 1988, Dallas was a member of Submarine Squadron 2, New London. During her time with Squadron 2, she completed the first ever Depot Modernization Period and various overseas deployments.

Dallas completed an engineered refueling overhaul at the Portsmouth Naval Shipyard in Kittery, Maine, in 1998. The D1G-2 core was replaced with a D2W core. Dallas has had a removable dry deck shelter for over a decade. This large chamber, fitted aft of the sail, has an array of air, water, and hydraulic systems that allow Dallas to employ the swimmer delivery vehicle, a highly mobile and virtually undetectable means of carrying out special forces missions.

Dallas has completed one Indian Ocean, four Mediterranean Sea, two Persian Gulf, and seven North Atlantic deployments.

=== Museum and delayed inactivation ===
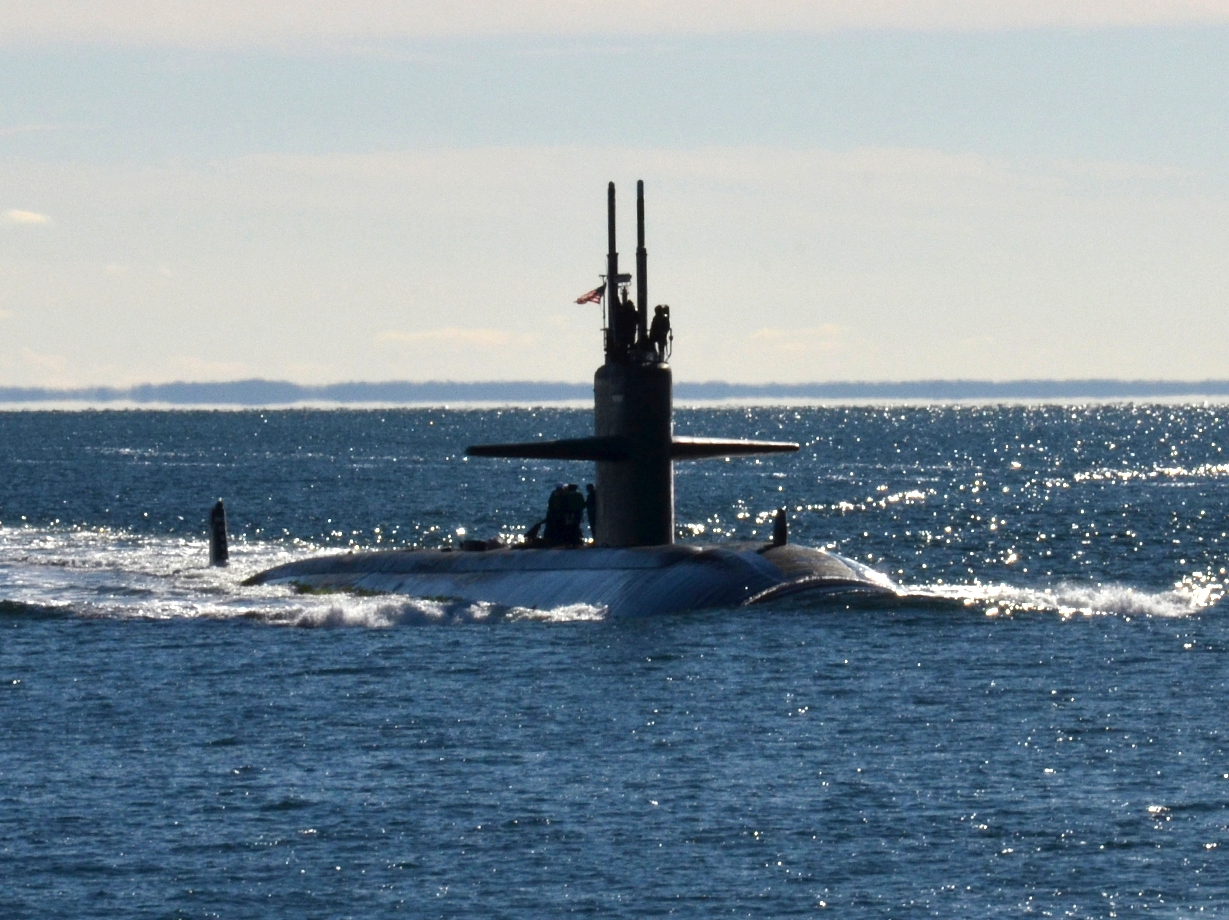
Dallas returning from her 2013 deployment

Naval Sea Systems Command, the city of Dallas, and the Dallas Navy League began discussions in 2008 for items from the boat in support of a memorial. These will become available during the actual vessel recycling phase, which was scheduled for 2023 for Dallas. Originally, the decommissioning of Dallas was scheduled for September 2014. In May 2013, officials with the city of Dallas announced a plan to create a maritime museum more than 250 miles (400 km) from the nearest body of water in which a submarine can operate. Mayor Mike Rawlings and members of a foundation formed to create the new facility revealed one of their goals was to acquire and display Dallas next to a 30,000-square-foot (2,800 m^{2}) museum building.

In 2013, the US Navy announced that the plan to retire Dallas had been extended to Fiscal Year 2017, and that instead, USS Norfolk would begin inactivation in early 2015. The Navy projected to save $10 million in preinactivation restricted availability costs as a result of the change.

A "Dallas Maritime Museum", announced in 2013 to be located along the banks of the Trinity River, had planned to contain some components of the original boat, such as her sail. Some initial, enthusiastic, but technically unfounded proposals discussed moving the entire, nearly 7,000-ton submarine to the museum. Unhelpfully, albeit a need of the Navy, the boat's on-again, off-again retirement scheduling impacted the project's momentum. Over years, the project languished, lost its staffing, supporters, and allocated real estate site, and quietly shut down. The museum's website was now for sale in 2018.

The Dallas Navy League had planned to host the four-day inactivation ceremony, to take place in Galveston, Texas, on 7 April 2017. The Navy League subsequently reported that this public-relations event was canceled by the US Navy, citing "budgetary constraints" while operating under a continuing resolution. Additionally, costs to the City of Dallas and/or the US Navy from leasing back already-allocated pier space were judged as excessive. The requirement to compensate commercial shipping companies for their already-reserved commercial pier space resulted from the Navy's on-again/off-again planning cycle for the inactivation ceremony, which ultimately was recanceled.

== Awards ==
Dallas received two Meritorious Unit Commendations and two Navy Unit Commendations and was awarded the Battle Efficiency E for FYs 1986, 1991, 1992, 1993, 1999, 2000, and 2013. Her further recognition includes nomination for the 1993 Battenberg Cup as the best all-around ship in the fleet and the 1999 Engineering "E" and Medical "M".

== In fiction ==
- Dallas features prominently in the 1984 Tom Clancy novel The Hunt for Red October and its 1990 film adaptation.
- Dallas is featured along with her sister boat USS Charlotte in the John Ringo novel Under a Graveyard Sky.
- Dallas is featured in the popular 2009 video game Call of Duty: Modern Warfare 2 in the mission "The Only Easy Day... Was Yesterday", alongside USS Chicago when they were part of the Sixth Fleet.
