= Ethan Allen-class submarine =

United States Navy class of fleet ballistic missile submarines

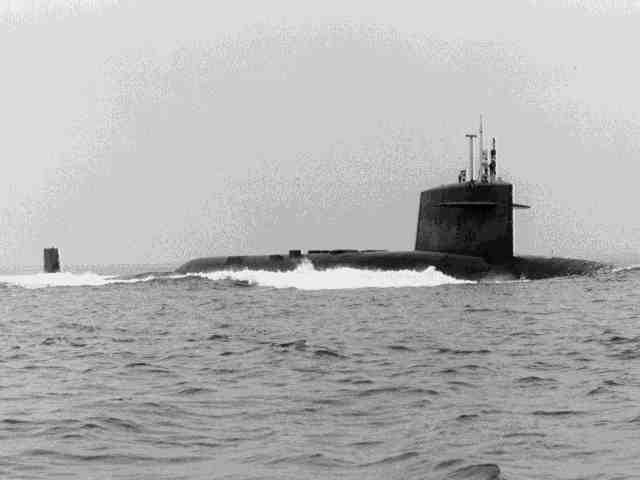
- USS Ethan Allen

Class overview
- Name: Ethan Allen class
- Builders: General Dynamics Electric Boat; Newport News Shipbuilding
- Operators: United States Navy
- Preceded by: George Washington class
- Succeeded by: Lafayette class
- Built: 1959–1963
- In commission: 1961–1992
- Completed: 5
- Retired: 5

General characteristics
- Type: Ballistic missile submarine
- Displacement: Surfaced: 6,946 long tons (7,057 t) Submerged: 7,884 long tons (8,011 t)
- Length: 410 ft 4 in (125.07 m)
- Beam: 33.1 ft (10.1 m)
- Draft: 29 ft 10 in (9.09 m)
- Propulsion: 1 S5W PWR; 2 geared steam turbines (15,000 shp (11,000 kW)), 1 shaft
- Speed: 16 knots (30 km/h) surfaced; 22 knots (41 km/h) submerged
- Test depth: 1,300 ft (400 m)
- Complement: 12 officers and 128 enlisted (two crews, "Blue" and "Gold")
- Armament: 16 Polaris A2/A3 missiles, 4 × 21-inch (533 mm) torpedo tubes, 12 torpedoes

The Ethan Allen class of fleet ballistic missile submarine was an evolutionary development from the George Washington class. The Ethan Allen, together with the George Washington, Lafayette, James Madison, and Benjamin Franklin classes comprised the "41 for Freedom" that were the Navy's main contribution to the nuclear deterrent force through the late 1980s.

== Design ==
Rather than being designed as Skipjack-class attack submarines with a missile compartment added, the Ethan Allens were the first submarines designed "from the keel up" as Fleet Ballistic Missile (FBM) submarines carrying the Polaris A-2 missile - the Ethan Allen-class was the first to be designed under project SCB 180, and the George Washington-class was a subsequent design (SCB 180A) made for a quickly implemented mobilization effort. They were functionally similar to the George Washingtons, but longer and more streamlined and with torpedo tubes reduced to four. In the early and mid-1970s, they were upgraded to Polaris A3s. Because their missile tubes could not be modified to carry the larger diameter Poseidon missile, they were not further upgraded.

== Conversions ==
To comply with SALT II treaty limitations as the Ohio-class ballistic missile submarines entered service, in the early 1980s the Ethan Allens were refitted and officially designated SSNs (fast attack submarines), but often referred to as a "slow approach". Their missile fire control systems were removed and the missile tubes were filled with concrete. Sam Houston and John Marshall were further converted to carry SEALs or other Special Operations Forces, accommodating 67 troops each with dry deck shelters to accommodate SEAL Delivery Vehicles or other equipment. The Ethan Allen-class submarines were decommissioned between 1983 and 1992. All were disposed of through the nuclear Ship-Submarine Recycling Program 1992–1999.

== Boats in class ==
Submarines of the Ethan Allen class:

Hull number	Name	Builder	Laid down	Launched	Commissioned	Decommissioned	Fate
SSBN-608	Ethan Allen	General Dynamics Electric Boat	14 September 1959	22 November 1960	8 August 1961	31 March 1983	Disposed, (Note: through the Ship-Submarine Recycling Program) 1999
SSBN-609	Sam Houston	Newport News Shipbuilding and Drydock Co.	28 December 1959	2 February 1961	6 March 1962	6 September 1991	Disposed, 1992
SSBN-610	Thomas A. Edison	General Dynamics Electric Boat	15 March 1960	15 June 1961	10 March 1962	1 December 1983	Disposed, 1997
SSBN-611	John Marshall	Newport News Shipbuilding and Drydock Co.	4 April 1960	15 July 1961	21 May 1962	22 July 1992	Disposed, 1993
SSBN-618	Thomas Jefferson	Newport News Shipbuilding and Drydock Co.	3 February 1961	24 February 1962	4 January 1963	24 January 1985	Disposed, 1998

== See also ==
- List of submarines of the United States Navy
- List of submarine classes of the United States Navy
