= USS John Marshall =

Submarine of the United States

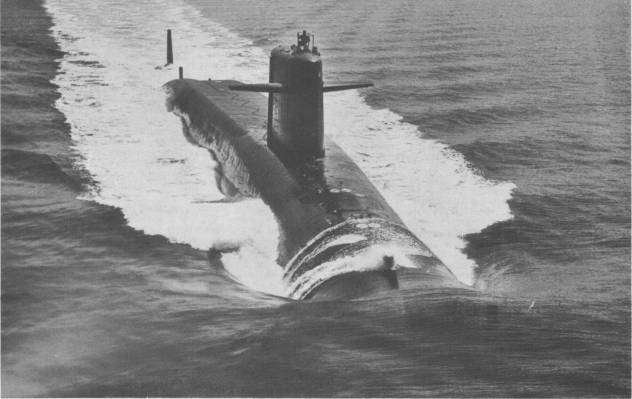
- USS John Marshall (SSBN-611)

History

United States
- Name: USS John Marshall (SSBN/SSN-611)
- Namesake: Named for John Marshall (1755–1835), the Chief Justice of the United States.
- Ordered: 1 July 1959
- Builder: Newport News Shipbuilding and Dry Dock Company
- Laid down: 4 April 1960
- Launched: 15 July 1961
- Sponsored by: Mrs. Robert F. Kennedy
- Commissioned: 21 May 1962
- Decommissioned: 22 July 1992
- Reclassified: Attack submarine, SSN-611, 12 January 1981
- Stricken: 22 July 1992
- Fate: Disposed of via Ship and Submarine Recycling Program 29 March 1993

General characteristics
- Class & type: Ethan Allen class fleet ballistic missile submarine 1962–1980; Attack submarine 1981–1992
- Displacement: 6,900 tons surfaced 7,900 tons submerged
- Length: 410 feet 4 inches (125.07 m)
- Beam: 33.1 feet (10.1 m)
- Draft: 27 feet 5 inches (8.36 m)
- Propulsion: S5W reactor – two geared steam turbines – one shaft
- Speed: 16 knots surfaced, 21 knots (24 mph; 39 km/h) submerged
- Test depth: 1,300 feet (400 m)
- Complement: 12 officers and 128 enlisted men (two crews: blue and gold)
- Armament: 16 fleet ballistic missiles (as ballistic missile submarine; deactivated 1981); 4 × 21 inches (530 mm) torpedo tubes

USS John Marshall (SSBN-611) was an Ethan Allen-class submarine, the only ship of the United States Navy to be named for John Marshall (1755–1835), the fourth Chief Justice of the United States. Originally a fleet ballistic missile submarine designated SSBN-611, she later was reclassified as an attack submarine and re-designated SSN-611.

== Construction and commissioning ==
John Marshall's keel was laid down on 4 April 1960 by Newport News Shipbuilding and Dry Dock Company of Newport News, Virginia. She was launched on 15 July 1961 sponsored by Ethel (Skakel) Kennedy, wife of Attorney General Robert F. Kennedy, and commissioned on 21 May 1962 with Commander Robert W. Stecher commanding the Blue Crew and Commander Robert D. Donavan commanding the Gold Crew.

== Service as a fleet ballistic missile submarine, 1962–1980 ==
John Marshall began her sea trials on 8 April 1962. On 21 May, John Marshall joined the Atlantic Fleet as a unit of Submarine Squadron 14 (SUBRON14). On 31 May, she began her shakedown cruise, which culminated on 12 July with the successful firing of two Polaris A-2 missiles by the Blue crew and followed by the launch of three more by the Gold crew within days off Cape Canaveral, Florida. In October, with a port call in İzmir, Turkey, she became the first U.S. FBM to visit a foreign port. On 31 December, John Marshall sailed for her first Polaris patrol. Manned by the Blue crew, she became the ninth operational fleet ballistic missile submarine.

From 4 April 1963 to 30 November 1966, the Blue and Gold crews conducted a total of seventeen deterrent patrols from Holy Loch, Scotland.

On 13 December 1966, John Marshall started her first major overhaul at Newport News Shipbuilding. The overhaul was completed in April 1968. After the post-overhaul shakedown, she loaded ballistic missiles at Charleston, South Carolina, and in September 1968 began her eighteenth deterrent patrol. She conducted her 19th through 25th deterrent patrols from Holy Loch between October 1968 and June 1970. In June 1970, she became a unit of Submarine Squadron 16 and began operations from Rota, Spain.

She conducted her 26th through 37th deterrent patrols from Rota. She was awarded her first Meritorious Unit Commendation as a result of an operation conducted in March 1971 that demonstrated the effectiveness and dependability of the fleet ballistic missile system. In June 1973, she returned to New London, Connecticut, for a dependents cruise, then conducted two deterrent patrols from Charleston, South Carolina.

On 1 November 1974, John Marshall began her second refueling overhaul at Mare Island Naval Shipyard at Vallejo, California. During this overhaul, the missile systems were converted to support the Polaris A-3 missile. The overhaul was completed in May 1976 and John Marshall commenced strategic deterrent patrols in February 1977 as a unit of Submarine Squadron 15. she conducted her 40th through 54th deterrent patrols from Apra Harbor, Guam. Her final deterrent patrol concluded with her arrival at Pearl Harbor, Hawaii, on 28 December 1980.

== Service as an attack submarine, 1981–1992 ==
On 12 January 1981, John Marshall was reclassified as an attack submarine and given hull number SSN-611. She began operations as an attack submarine from Pearl Harbor. Her last Polaris missile was removed in Bangor, Washington, on 1 June 1981.

John Marshall arrived in Charleston, South Carolina, on 20 July 1981 and began operations as a unit of Submarine Squadron 4. On 28 December 1981, she departed for her first deployment to the Mediterranean Sea. The deployment included several major fleet exercises and visits to La Maddalena, Italy; Naples, Italy; Tangiers, Morocco; and Lisbon, Portugal. She returned to Charleston on 21 May 1982, twenty years to the day after she was commissioned.

In September 1983, John Marshall again transferred to the Pacific Fleet and arrived at Puget Sound Naval Shipyard at Bremerton, Washington, on 29 September to start her third overhaul. She (along with her sister, USS Sam Houston (SSBN-609)) was modified to support operations. This included the installation of additional troop berthing, the removal of some ballistic missile tube bases, and the conversion of other ballistic missile tubes into air locks and stowage for equipment. She was fitted with two Dry Deck Shelters (DDSs) abaft her sail. These, which house SEAL team Swimmer Delivery Vehicles, allow her to act as a SEAL mother ship. Post-overhaul sea trials were conducted in September 1985 and John Marshall joined Submarine Squadron 6 in Norfolk, Virginia, in November 1985.

On 15 December 1986, John Marshall began her transit for her second deployment to the Mediterranean Sea. The deployment included several exercises and a demonstration of her unique special warfare capability and visits to Toulon, France; and La Maddalena, Italy. She returned to Norfolk, Virginia, on 29 May 1987.

In September 1987, John Marshall conducted a special operational demonstration near Puerto Rico with SEAL Team Two. Aircraft carrier battlegroup exercises, special acoustic trials, and dry deck shelter operations continued through 1988. She made her 1,000th dive on 25 October 1988, off Puerto Rico.

On 1 May 1989, after conducting a variety of exercises with aircraft carrier battlegroups and other submarines, John Marshall departed for her third Mediterranean deployment. It was the first time a submarine had deployed anywhere in the world with two dry deck shelters on board, adding a unique flexibility and endurance to the fleet commander for special warfare operations. Embarked when John Marshall departed Norfolk was the largest special warfare detachment in the Atlantic or Mediterranean. During the 1989 deployment, John Marshall's response to contingency operations, providing forward area support of a unique nature on extremely short notice, as well as her success in antisubmarine warfare operations, was recognized in the award to John Marshall of the Meritorious Unit Commendation. John Marshall returned to Norfolk in September 1989.

John Marshall conducted three special warfare training exercises in the Caribbean Sea in 1990, including a highly successful exercise that featured the employment of submarine-launched mobile mines.

On 26 January 1991, John Marshall departed Norfolk for her fourth and final deployment to the Mediterranean. Equipped once again with two dry deck shelters, she operated in direct support of Operation Desert Storm and provided significant capability options to the United States Sixth Fleet commander. She visited Toulon, Gibraltar, and La Maddalena, returning to Norfolk on 22 June 1991.

In September 1991, John Marshall served as flagship for the largest submarine special warfare exercise since World War II. Over 191 personnel, including three flag officers, U.S. Navy SEALs, and United States Army special forces, embarked to conduct joint special operations during Exercise Phantom Shadow.

John Marshall transited to the Pacific in early 1992 to begin deactivation at Puget Sound Naval Shipyard, where she was decommissioned and stricken from the Naval Vessel Register on 22 July 1992. She was disposed of through the Nuclear Power Ship and Submarine Recycling Program on 29 March 1993.

== Commemoration ==
John Marshall's ship's bell is on display at Marshall University in Huntington, West Virginia.

In 2012, BIC issued a series of lighters commemorating the United States Armed Forces, with proceeds benefiting the USO. A photograph of the John Marshall's sail taken while the boat was cruising on the surface was used for one depiction of the United States Navy.
