= Ship-Submarine Recycling Program =

US Navy process to dispose of decommissioned nuclear vessels

The Ship-Submarine Recycling Program (SRP) is the process that the United States Navy uses to dispose of decommissioned nuclear vessels. SRP takes place only at the Puget Sound Naval Shipyard (PSNS) in Bremerton, Washington, but the preparations can begin elsewhere.

== Program overview ==
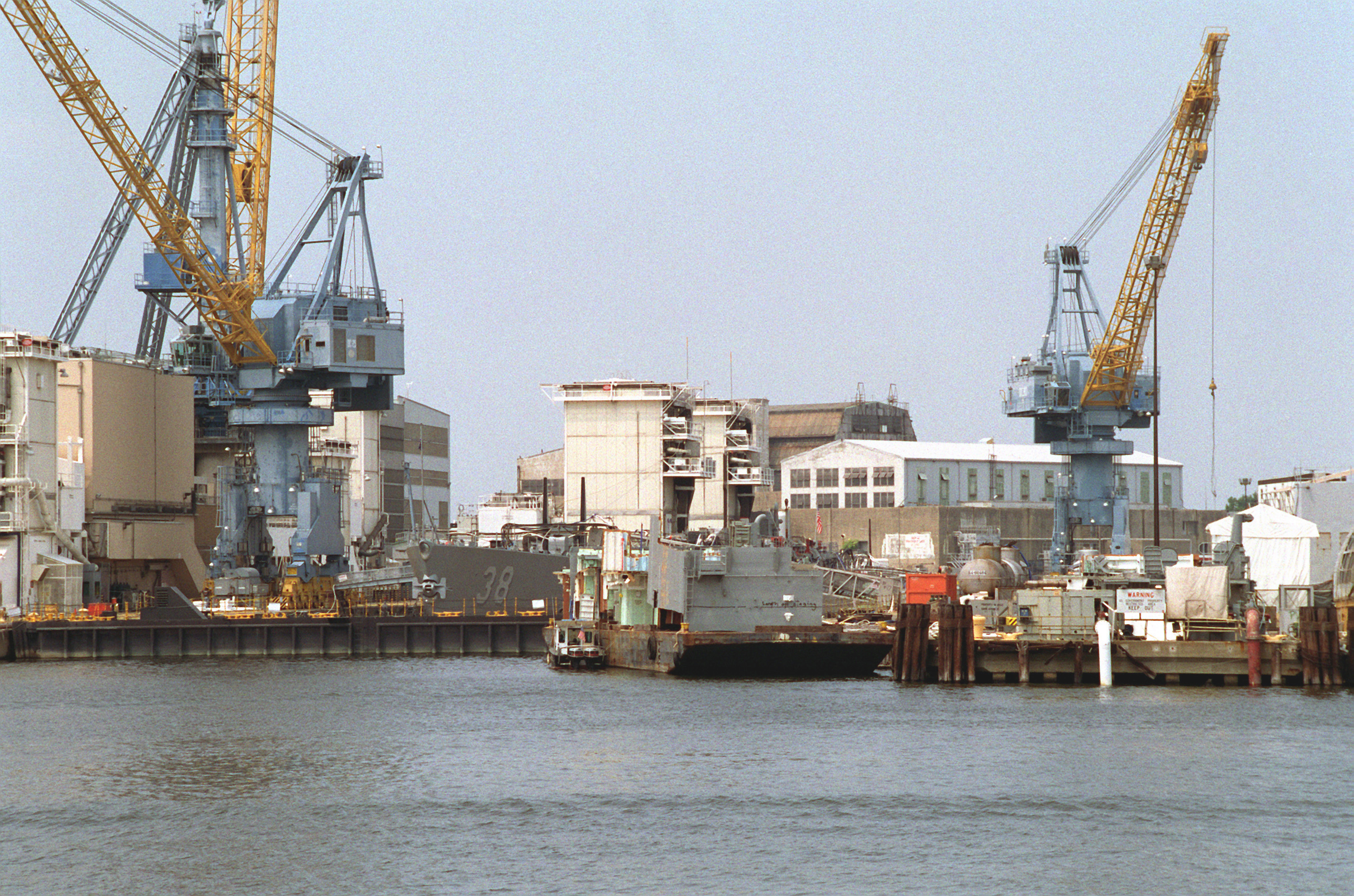
In this image, the superstructure of Virginia has been replaced with containment structures to remove nuclear fuel before entering SRP.

=== Defueling and decommissioning ===
Before SRP can begin, the ship must first have all equipment, supplies, maintenance materials, and other items removed. Fluids such as coolant, oil, and hydraulic fluid must also be removed. After the removal of everything on the ship, the removal of the ship's nuclear fuel vessel may begin; defueling usually coincides with decommissioning. Until the fuel is removed, the vessel is referred to as "USS Name," after the fuel is removed, the "USS" prefix is dropped, and it is referred to as "ex-Name." Reusable equipment and nuclear fuel are removed together.

=== Spent fuel storage ===
Spent nuclear fuel is shipped by rail to the Naval Reactor Facility in the Idaho National Laboratory (INL), located 42 miles (68 km) northwest of Idaho Falls, Idaho, where it is stored in special canisters.

=== Hull salvage ===
At PSNS, the SRP proper begins. The salvage workers cut the submarine into three or four pieces: the aft section, the reactor compartment, the missile compartment, if one exists, and the forward section. Missile compartments are dismantled according to the provisions of the Strategic Arms Reductions Treaty.

Until 1991, the forward and aft sections of the submarines were rejoined and placed in floating storage. Various proposals for disposal of those hulls were considered, including sinking them at sea, but none proved economically practical. Some submarines built prior to the 1978 banning of polychlorinated biphenyl products (PCBs) had the chemicals on board, which are considered hazardous materials by the Environmental Protection Agency and United States Coast Guard, requiring their removal. Since then, and to help reduce costs, the remaining submarine sections are recycled, returning reusable materials to production. In the process of submarine recycling, all hazardous and toxic wastes are identified and removed, and reusable equipment is removed and put into inventory. Scrap metals and all other materials are sold to private companies or reused. The overall process is not profitable, but does provide some cost relief. Disposal of submarines by the SRP costs the Navy US$25–50 million per submarine.

=== Reactor vessel disposal ===
Once the de-fueled reactor compartment is removed, it is sealed at both ends and shipped by barge and multiple-wheel high-capacity trailers to the Department of Energy's Hanford Nuclear Reservation in Washington state, where they are currently, as of 2016, kept in open dry storage and slated to be eventually buried. Russian submarine reactor compartments are stored in similar fashion at Sayda-Guba (Sayda Bay) in northwestern Russia and Chazhma Bay near Vladivostok. The burial trenches have been evaluated to be secure for at least 600 years before the first pinhole penetration of some lead containment areas of the reactor compartment packages occurs, and several thousand years before leakage becomes possible.

=== Prior disposal methods ===
In 1959 the US Navy removed a nuclear reactor from the submarine USS Seawolf and replaced it with a new type. The removed reactor was scuttled in the Atlantic Ocean, 200 km (108 nmi) east of Delaware, at a depth of 2,700 m (8,858 ft). In 1972, the London Dumping Convention restricted ocean disposal of radioactive waste and in 1993, ocean disposal of radioactive waste was completely banned. The US Navy began a study on scrapping nuclear submarines; two years later shallow land burial of reactor compartments was selected as the most suitable option.

In 1990, USS Scamp was the first US nuclear-powered submarine to be scrapped.

=== Future salvage work ===
By the end of 2005, 195 nuclear submarines had been ordered or built in the US (including the NR-1 Deep Submergence Craft and Virginia, but none of the later Virginia class). The last of the regular Sturgeon attack boats, L. Mendel Rivers, was decommissioned in 2001, and Parche, a highly modified Sturgeon, was decommissioned in 2004. The last of the initial "41 for Freedom" fleet ballistic missile (FBM) submarines, Kamehameha, was decommissioned in 2002. Decommissioning of the Los Angeles boats began in 1995 with Baton Rouge. Additionally, a handful of nuclear-powered cruisers have entered the program, and their dismantling is ongoing. The first aircraft carrier due for decommissioning that would enter the SRP is planned to be Enterprise, which was withdrawn in 2013. Unlike the disposal of other nuclear powered surface ships, all of which have been recycled at the Puget Sound Naval Shipyard and Intermediate Maintenance Facility, the Navy is looking at other, commercial or private sector options for Enterprise in an effort to reduce both the cost of the work and the time taken to dismantle such a large vessel, as well as negating the difficulty of towing the hulk all the way from Newport News, where it is stored, to Puget Sound. Enterprise will be used as the pilot project to look at the disposal of nuclear-powered aircraft carriers, with the lessons learned from the ship's eventual scrapping to be incorporated into the plans for the upcoming disposal of the first Nimitz-class ships. To this end, in 2024, the US Navy established the CVN Inactivation and Disposal Program Office, under the oversight of the Program Executive Office, Aircraft Carriers.

In December 2020, it was announced that a further nine Los Angeles-class attack submarines, two Ohio-class guided missile submarines, and the aircraft carrier Nimitz would be decommissioned and enter the recycling program by 2026. However, in November 2023, a further announcement was made that, owing to delays in both the construction of ships of the Gerald R. Ford class and the Refueling and Complex Overhaul work on the existing Nimitz class ships, the US Navy was looking to extend the service life of Nimitz beyond 2026, and Dwight D. Eisenhower, which was planned to decommission in 2027.

Hulls waiting or already processed by the recycling program are listed below.

== Lists of vessels by type ==
=== Aircraft carriers ===
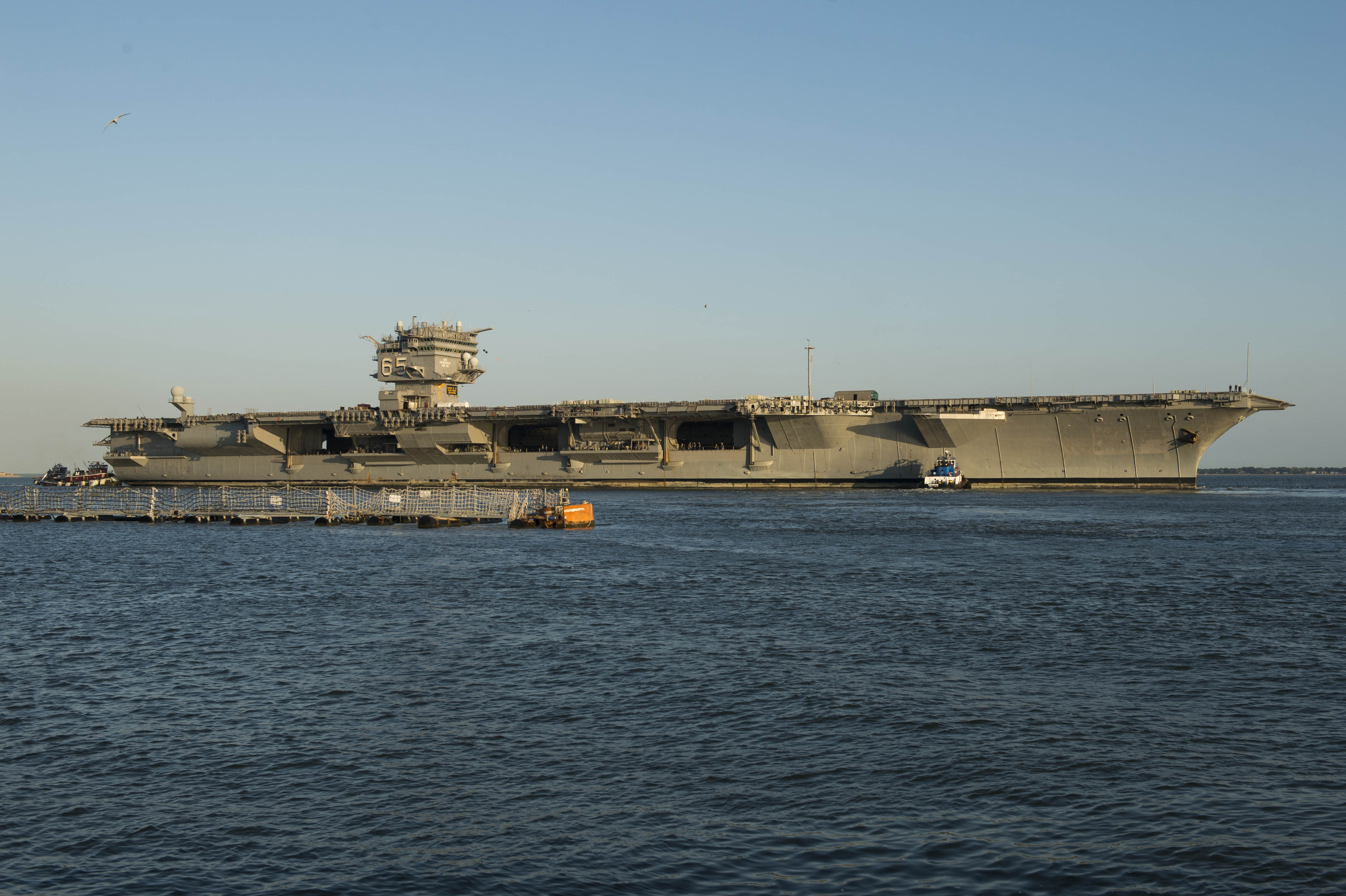
Enterprise under tow to Newport News Shipbuilding to begin the defuelling process in June 2013

Ship name (Hull number)	Start date	Completion date
ex-Enterprise (CVAN/CVN-65)	3 February 2017	De-fueled, inactivated

In September 2023, it was announced that, once any remaining radioactive and hazardous material had been removed, ex-Enterprise would be broken up at a commercial shipyard. In May 2025, a consortium consisting of NorthStar Maritime Dismantlement Services and Modern American Recycling and Radiological Services won the contract to dispose of ex-Enterprise, with the work to be undertaken at a breaker's yard in Mobile, Alabama, and completed by November 2029. However, the contract process was reopened in February 2026 by order of the Court of Federal Claims following a protest from a competitor. On 2 November 2026, with all defuelling work complete and the legal challenges dropped, Enterprise was towed from Newport News bound for Mobile for scrapping.

=== Cruisers ===
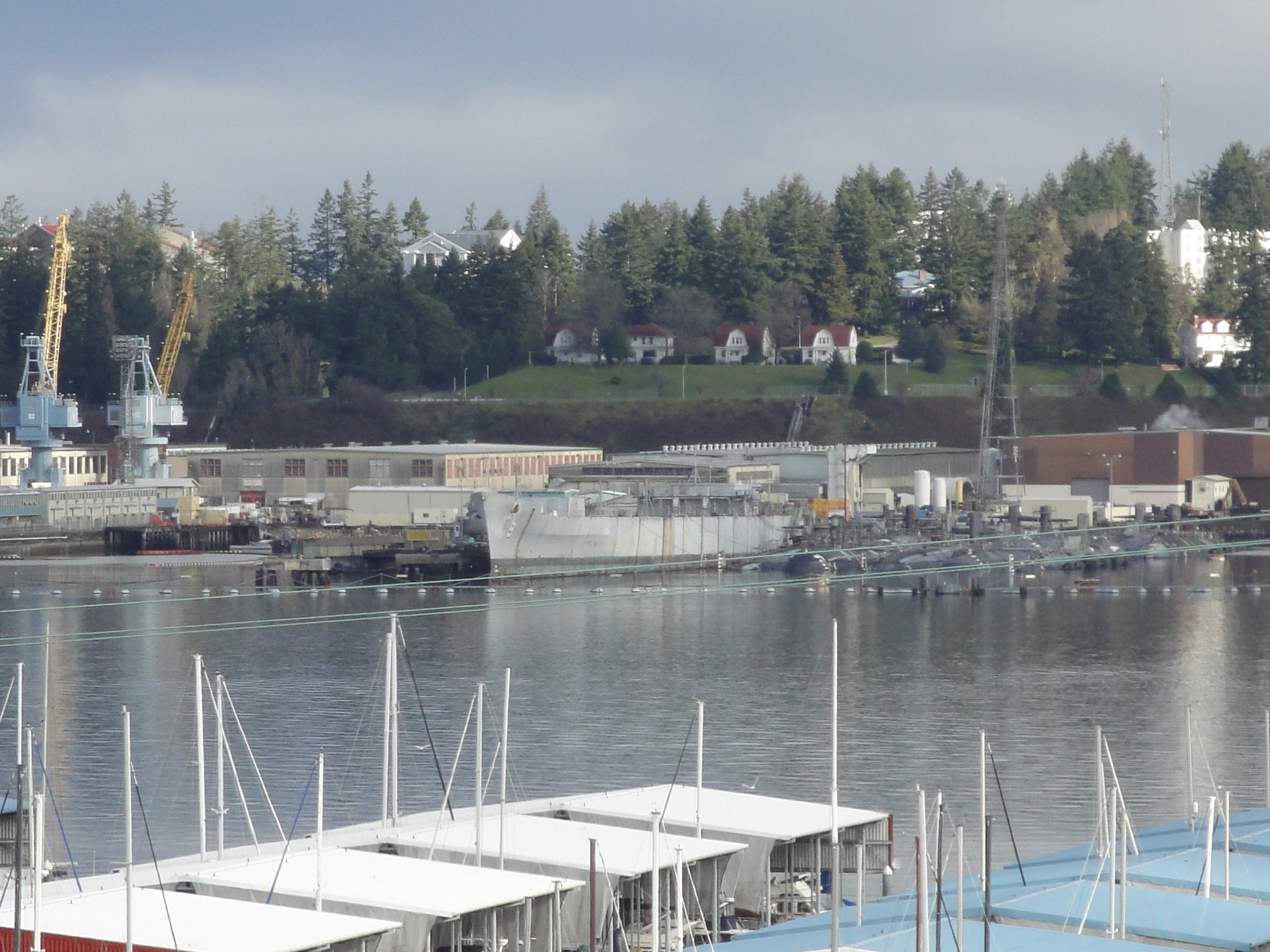
The hull of Long Beach moored at Puget Sound awaiting disposal in March 2011

Ship name (Hull number)	Start date	Completion date
ex-Long Beach (CGN-9)	1 May 2009	Incomplete (note)
ex-Bainbridge (DLGN/CGN-25)	1 October 1997	30 October 1999
ex-Truxtun (DLGN/CGN-35)	1 October 1997	28 April 1999
ex-California (DLGN/CGN-36)	1 October 1998	12 May 2000
ex-South Carolina (DLGN/CGN-37)	1 October 2007	10 May 2010 †
ex-Virginia (CGN-38)	1 October 1999	25 September 2002
ex-Texas (CGN-39)	1 October 1999	30 October 2001
ex-Mississippi (CGN-40)	1 October 2004	5 December 2006
ex-Arkansas (CGN-41)	7 July 1998	1 November 1999

† A dagger after a completion date indicates that portions of the hull were preserved as memorials. See the individual articles for details.

(note) ex-Long Beach has been partially dismantled and remains moored in Puget Sound Naval Shipyard in 2018.

=== Attack submarines ===
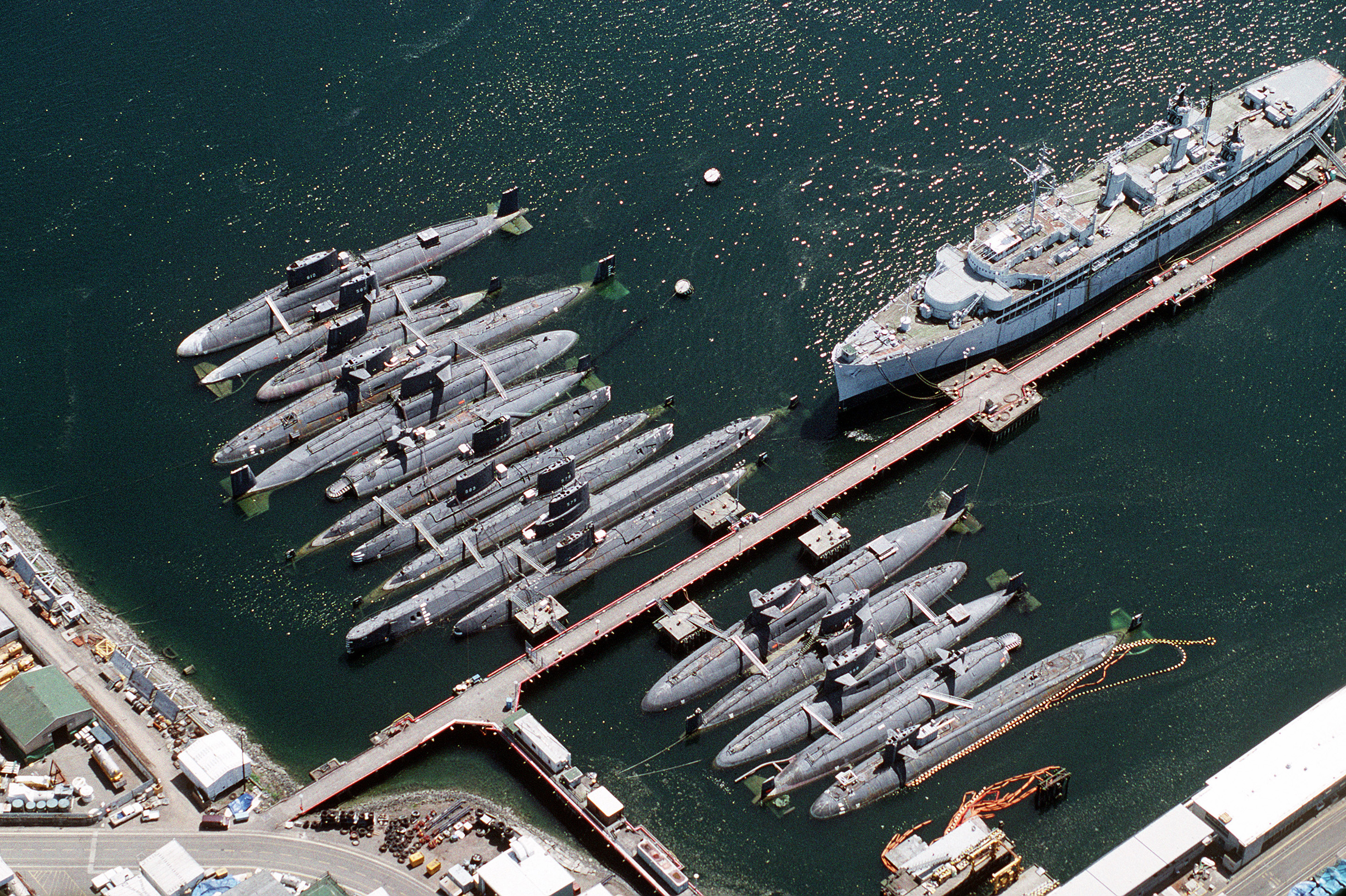
A total of sixteen decommissioned SSNs and SSBNs moored awaiting their fate at Puget Sound in May 1993

Some of these submarines (the George Washington class) were fleet ballistic missile boats for the vast majority of their careers. However, they were briefly converted to SSNs before decommissioning and arrival at PSNS, and so are listed under that designation here. The nuclear-powered research submersible NR-1 is also included in this list.

Ship name (Hull number)	Start date	Completion date/status
ex-Seawolf (SSN-575)	1 October 1996	30 September 1997
ex-Skate (SSN-578)	14 April 1994	6 March 1995
ex-Swordfish (SSN-579)	Unknown	11 September 1995
ex-Sargo (SSN-583)	14 April 1994	5 April 1995
ex-Seadragon (SSN-584)	1 October 1994	18 September 1995
ex-Skipjack (SSN-585)	17 March 1996	1 September 1998
ex-Triton (SSRN/SSN-586)	1 October 2007	30 November 2009 †
ex-Halibut (SSGN/SSN-587)	12 July 1993	9 September 1994
ex-Scamp (SSN-588)	1990 (the first)	9 September 1994
ex-Sculpin (SSN-590)	1 October 2000	30 October 2001
ex-Shark (SSN-591)	1 October 1995	28 June 1996
ex-Snook (SSN-592)	1 October 1996	30 June 1997
ex-Permit (SSN-594)	30 September 1991	20 May 1993
ex-Plunger (SSN-595)	5 January 1995	8 March 1996
ex-Barb (SSN-596)	Unknown	14 March 1996
ex-Tullibee (SSN-597)	5 January 1995	1 April 1996
ex-George Washington (SSBN/SSN-598)	Unknown	30 September 1998†
ex-Patrick Henry (SSBN/SSN-599)	1 October 1996	31 August 1997
ex-Theodore Roosevelt (SSBN/SSN-600)	Unknown	24 March 1995
ex-Robert E. Lee (SSBN/SSN-601)	Unknown	30 September 1991
ex-Pollack (SSN-603)	9 February 1993	17 February 1995
ex-Haddo (SSN-604)	Unknown	30 June 1992
ex-Jack (SSN-605)	Unknown	30 June 1992
ex-Tinosa (SSN-606)	15 July 1991	26 June 1992
ex-Dace (SSN-607)	Unknown	1 January 1997
ex-Ethan Allen (SSBN/SSN-608)	Unknown	30 July 1999
ex-Sam Houston (SSBN/SSN-609)	1 March 1991	3 February 1992
ex-Thomas A. Edison (SSBN/SSN-610)	1 October 1996	1 December 1997
ex-John Marshall (SSBN/SSN-611)	22 July 1992	29 March 1993
ex-Guardfish (SSN-612)	Unknown	9 July 1992
ex-Flasher (SSN-613)	Unknown	11 May 1994
ex-Greenling (SSN-614)	30 September 1993	18 April 1994
ex-Gato (SSN-615)	Unknown	1 November 1996
ex-Haddock (SSN-621)	1 October 2000	1 October 2001
ex-Sturgeon (SSN-637)	Unknown	11 December 1995 †
ex-Whale (SSN-638)	20 October 1995	1 July 1996
ex-Tautog (SSN-639)	15 March 2003	30 September 2004
ex-Kamehameha (SSBN/SSN-642)	1 October 2001	28 February 2003
ex-James K. Polk (SSBN/SSN-645)	16 February 1999	15 July 2000
ex-Grayling (SSN-646)	18 July 1997	31 March 1998
ex-Pogy (SSN-647)	4 January 1999	12 April 2000
ex-Aspro (SSN-648)	1 October 1999	3 November 2000
ex-Sunfish (SSN-649)	Unknown	31 October 1997
ex-Pargo (SSN-650)	1 October 1994	15 October 1996
ex-Queenfish (SSN-651)	1 May 1992	7 April 1993
ex-Puffer (SSN-652)	20 October 1995	12 July 1996
ex-Ray (SSN-653)	15 March 2002	30 July 2003
ex-Sand Lance (SSN-660)	1 April 1998	30 August 1999
ex-Lapon (SSN-661)	15 March 2003	30 November 2004
ex-Gurnard (SSN-662)	Unknown	15 October 1996
ex-Hammerhead (SSN-663)	Unknown	22 November 1995
ex-Sea Devil (SSN-664)	1 March 1998	7 September 1999
ex-Guitarro (SSN-665)	Unknown	18 October 1994
ex-Hawkbill (SSN-666)	1 October 1999	1 December 2000 †
ex-Bergall (SSN-667)	Unknown	29 September 1997
ex-Spadefish (SSN-668)	1 October 1996	24 October 1997
ex-Seahorse (SSN-669)	1 March 1995	30 September 1996
ex-Finback (SSN-670)	Unknown	30 October 1997
ex-Narwhal (SSN-671)	1 October 2001	(museum plans failed; see article)
ex-Pintado (SSN-672)	1 October 1997	27 October 1998
ex-Flying Fish (SSN-673)	Unknown	15 October 1996
ex-Trepang (SSN-674)	4 January 1999	7 April 2000
ex-Bluefish (SSN-675)	15 March 2002	1 November 2003
ex-Billfish (SSN-676)	Unknown	26 April 2000
ex-Drum (SSN-677)	1 December 2008	20 May 2010
ex-Archerfish (SSN-678)	Unknown	6 November 1998
ex-Silversides (SSN-679)	1 October 2000	1 October 2001
ex-William H. Bates (SSN-680)	1 October 2002	30 October 2002
ex-Batfish (SSN-681)	Unknown	22 November 2002
ex-Tunny (SSN-682)	1 October 1997	27 October 1998
ex-Parche (SSN-683)	30 September 2004‡	30 November 2006 †
ex-Cavalla (SSN-684)	1 October 1999	16 November 2000
ex-Glenard P. Lipscomb (SSN-685)	Unknown	1 December 1997
ex-L. Mendel Rivers (SSN-686)	29 November 2000	19 July 2002
ex-Richard B. Russell (SSN-687)	1 October 2001	19 September 2002
ex-Los Angeles (SSN-688)	February 2011	5 March 2013
ex-Baton Rouge (SSN-689)	13 January 1995	30 September 1997
ex-Philadelphia (SSN-690)	1 September 2019	De-fueled, inactivated
ex-Memphis (SSN-691)	14 December 2010	De-fueled, inactivated
ex-Omaha (SSN-692)	1 October 2009	7 November 2011
ex-Cincinnati (SSN-693)	1 October 2009	22 September 2014
ex-Groton (SSN-694)	1 June 2012	5 May 2014
ex-Birmingham (SSN-695)	1 June 2012	23 September 2015
ex-New York City (SSN-696)	1 June 2011	De-fueled, inactivated
ex-Indianapolis (SSN-697)	1 October 2013	Recycling begun
ex-Bremerton (SSN-698)	21 May 2021	Being de-fueled/inactivated
ex-Jacksonville (SSN-699)	28 October 2021	Being de-fueled/inactivated
ex-Dallas (SSN-700)	22 May 2017	Being de-fueled/inactivated
ex-La Jolla (SSN-701)	N/A	Decommissioned 15 November 2019, currently serving as an MTS
ex-Phoenix (SSN-702)	1 June 2013	Decommissioned 29 July 1998
ex-Boston (SSN-703)	1 October 2001	19 September 2002 †
ex-Baltimore (SSN-704)	1 June 2013	Decommissioned 10 July 1998
ex-City of Corpus Christi (SSN-705)	24 November 2015	Being de-fueled/inactivated
ex-Albuquerque (SSN-706)	14 April 2016	De-fueled, inactivated
ex-Portsmouth (SSN-707)	1 June 2015	De-fueled, inactivated
ex-Minneapolis–Saint Paul (SSN-708)	1 June 2018	30 November 2021
ex-Hyman G. Rickover (SSN-709)	30 September 2016	De-fueled, inactivated
ex-Augusta (SSN-710)	1 September 2019	30 November 2021
ex-San Francisco (SSN-711)	N/A	Decommissioned 15 May 2022, currently serving as an MTS
ex-Atlanta (SSN-712)	1 October 2013	Recycling begun
ex-Houston (SSN-713)	21 September 2015	Being de-fueled/inactivated
ex-Norfolk (SSN-714)	11 December 2014	De-fueled, inactivated
ex-Buffalo (SSN-715)	26 May 2017	Arrived PSNS 26 May 2017
ex-Salt Lake City (SSN-716)	30 September 2015	30 November 2019
ex-Honolulu (SSN-718)	1 November 2006	20 October 2008
ex-Providence (SSN-719)	22 August 2022	Being de-fueled/inactivated
ex-Pittsburgh (SSN-720)	15 April 2020	Being de-fueled/inactivated
ex-Chicago (SSN-721)	26 January 2023	Arrived PSNS 26 January 2023
ex-Oklahoma City (SSN-723)	9 September 2022	Being de-fueled/inactivated
ex-Louisville (SSN-724)	9 March 2021	Being de-fueled/inactivated
ex-Miami (SSN-755)	28 March 2014	De-fueled, inactivated
ex-NR-1	29 November 2009	De-fueled, inactivated
Ship name (Hull number)	Start date	Completion date/status

† A dagger after a completion date indicates that portions of the hull were preserved as memorials. See the individual articles for details.

‡ Date given for ex-Parche is official date used to secure FY2004 funding; work did not begin until 19 October.

La Jolla (SSN/MTS-701) and San Francisco (SSN/MTS-711) were converted to Moored Training Ships at Norfolk Naval Shipyard and are currently operating at the Naval Nuclear Power Training Unit in Charleston, South Carolina.

=== Ballistic missile submarines ===
Some of these submarines (the Lafayette class) were fleet ballistic missile boats for the vast majority of their careers. However, they were converted to SSNs for use as moored training platforms and are not currently scheduled for recycling.

Ship name (Hull number)	Start date	Completion date/Status
See Attack Submarines – (SSBN/SSN-598)	n/a	n/a
See Attack Submarines – (SSBN/SSN-599)	n/a	n/a
ex-Theodore Roosevelt (SSBN-600)	unknown	24 March 1995
See Attack Submarines – (SSBN/SSN-601)	n/a	n/a
ex-Abraham Lincoln (SSBN-602)	unknown	5 May 1994
See Attack Submarines – (SSBN/SSN-608)	n/a	n/a
See Attack Submarines – (SSBN/SSN-609)	n/a	n/a
See Attack Submarines – (SSBN/SSN-610)	n/a	n/a
See Attack Submarines – (SSBN/SSN-611)	n/a	n/a
ex-Lafayette (SSBN-616)	1 March 1991	25 February 1992
ex-Alexander Hamilton (SSBN-617)	23 February 1993	28 February 1994
ex-Thomas Jefferson (SSBN-618)	1 October 1996	6 March 1998†
ex-Andrew Jackson (SSBN-619)	unknown	30 August 1999
ex-John Adams (SSBN-620)	unknown	12 February 1996
ex-James Monroe (SSBN-622)	unknown	10 January 1995
ex-Nathan Hale (SSBN-623)	2 October 1991	5 April 1995
ex-Woodrow Wilson (SSBN-624)	26 September 1997	27 October 1998†
ex-Henry Clay (SSBN-625)	unknown	30 September 1997
ex-Daniel Webster (SSBN-626) (Note: Originally converted to Moored Training Ship)	N/A	Awaiting inactivation and defueling
ex-James Madison (SSBN-627)	unknown	24 October 1997
ex-Tecumseh (SSBN-628)	15 February 1993	1 April 1994
ex-Daniel Boone (SSBN-629)	unknown	4 November 1994
ex-John C. Calhoun (SSBN-630)	unknown	18 November 1994
ex-Ulysses S. Grant (SSBN-631)	unknown	23 October 1993
ex-Von Steuben (SSBN-632)	1 October 2000	30 October 2001
ex-Casimir Pulaski (SSBN-633)	unknown	21 October 1994
ex-Stonewall Jackson (SSBN-634)	unknown	13 October 1995
ex-Sam Rayburn (SSBN-635)	5 April 2021	Being de-fueled/inactivated
ex-Nathanael Greene (SSBN-636)	1 September 1998	20 October 2000
ex-Benjamin Franklin (SSBN-640)	unknown	21 August 1995
ex-Simon Bolivar (SSBN-641)	1 October 1994	1 December 1995
ex-George Bancroft (SSBN-643)	unknown	30 March 1998†
ex-Lewis and Clark (SSBN-644)	1 October 1995	23 September 1996†
ex-George C. Marshall (SSBN-654)	unknown	28 February 1994
ex-Henry L. Stimson (SSBN-655)	unknown	12 August 1994
ex-George Washington Carver (SSBN-656)	unknown	21 March 1994
ex-Francis Scott Key (SSBN-657)	unknown	1 September 1995
ex-Mariano G. Vallejo (SSBN-658)	1 October 1994	22 December 1995
ex-Will Rogers (SSBN-659)	12 April 1993	12 August 1994
See Cruise Missle Submarines – (SSBN/SSGN-729)	n/a	n/a

† A dagger after a completion date indicates that portions of the hull were preserved as memorials. See the individual articles for details.

Because the program is underway, this list is almost certainly incomplete.

Note for ships marked with refit: Sam Rayburn (SSBN-635) was converted into a training platform – Moored Training Ship (MTS-635). Sam Rayburn arrived for conversion on 1 February 1986, and on 29 July 1989 the first moored training ship achieved initial criticality. Modifications included special mooring arrangements including a mechanism to absorb power generated by the main propulsion shaft. Daniel Webster (SSBN-626) was converted to the second Moored Training Ship (MTS-2 / MTS-626) in 1993. The Moored Training Ship Site is located at Naval Weapons Station Charleston in Goose Creek, South Carolina. Sam Rayburn is scheduled to operate as an MTS until 2014 while undergoing shipyard availabilities at four-year intervals.

=== Cruise missile submarines ===
These are former ballistic missile submarines converted to serve as platforms for the carriage of land attack missiles.

Ship name (Hull number)	Start date	Completion date/Status
ex-Georgia (SSBN/SSGN-729)	31 July 2026	Awaiting inactivation and defueling
