= USS L. Mendel Rivers =

Submarine of the United States

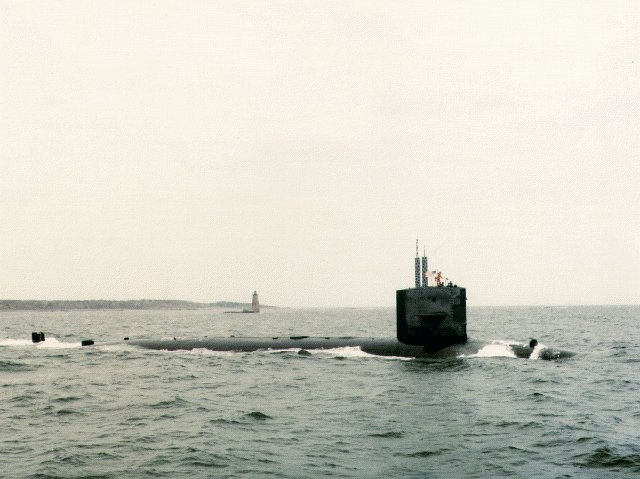
- USS L. Mendel Rivers (SSN-686)

History

United States
- Name: USS L. Mendel Rivers (SSN-686)
- Namesake: L. Mendel Rivers (1905–1970), U.S. Representative from South Carolina's 1st Congressional District (1941–1970)
- Ordered: 1 July 1969
- Builder: Newport News Shipbuilding and Dry Dock Company
- Laid down: 26 June 1971
- Launched: 2 June 1973
- Sponsored by: Margaret Rivers Eastman and Marion Rivers
- Commissioned: 1 February 1975
- Decommissioned: 10 May 2001
- Stricken: 10 May 2001
- Motto: Rivers Delivers
- Fate: Scrapping via Ship and Submarine Recycling Program completed 19 July 2002

General characteristics
- Class & type: Sturgeon-class attack submarine
- Displacement: 3,978 long tons (4,042 t) light; 4,270 long tons (4,339 t) full; 292 long tons (297 t) dead
- Length: 302 ft 3 in (92.13 m)
- Beam: 31 ft 8 in (9.65 m)
- Draft: 28 ft 8 in (8.74 m)
- Installed power: 15,000 shaft horsepower (11.2 megawatts)
- Propulsion: One S5W nuclear reactor, two steam turbines, one screw
- Speed: 15 knots (28 km/h; 17 mph) surfaced; 25 knots (46 km/h; 29 mph) submerged
- Test depth: 1,300 feet (400 meters)
- Complement: 126 (14 officers, 112 enlisted men)
- Armament: 4 × 21-inch (533 mm) torpedo tubes

USS L. Mendel Rivers (SSN-686), a Sturgeon-class attack submarine in commission from 1975 to 2001, is the only ship of the United States Navy thus far to have been named for L. Mendel Rivers (1905–1970), a U.S. Representative from South Carolina's 1st Congressional District (1941–1970).

== Construction and commissioning ==
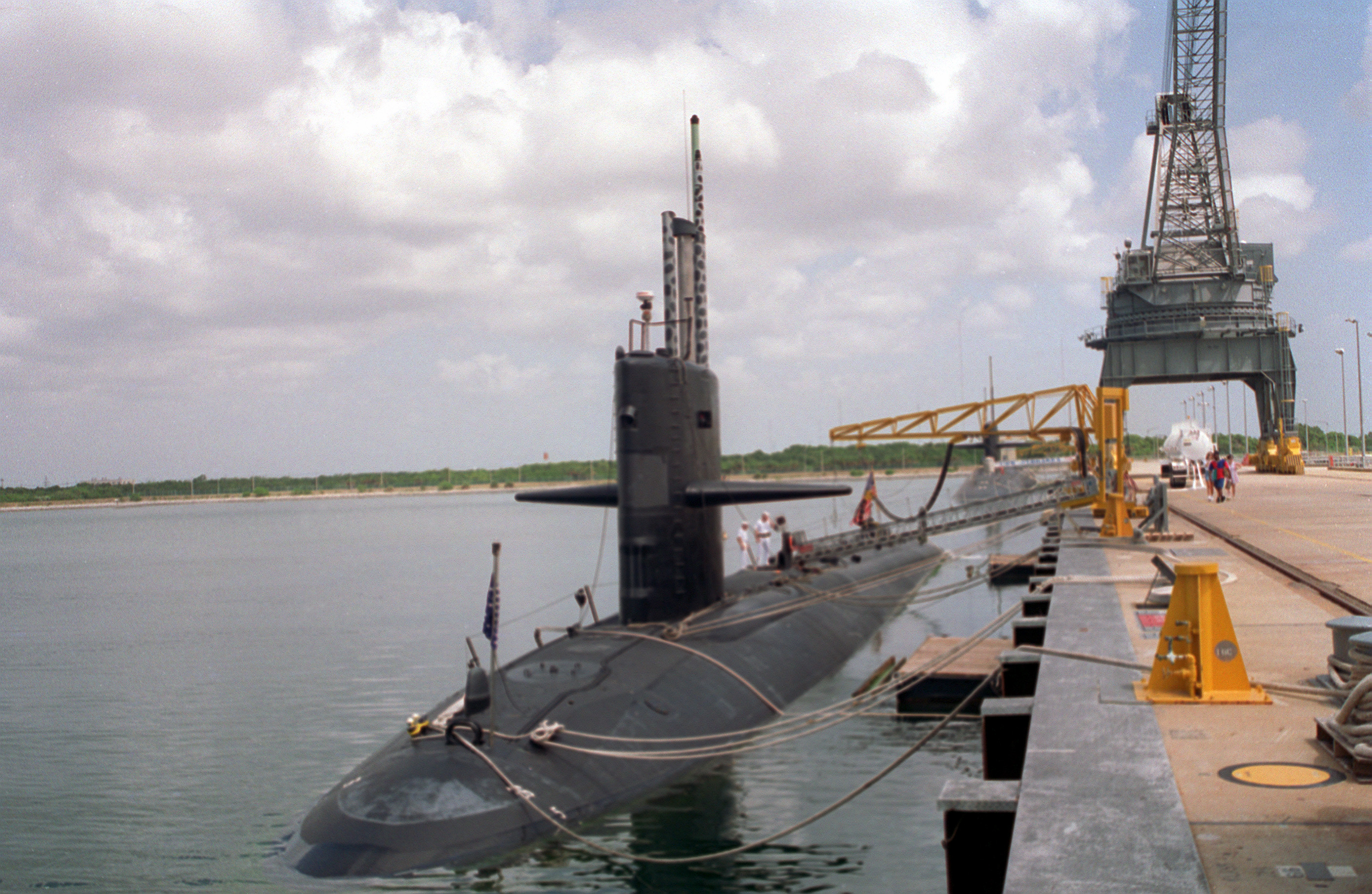
L. Mendel Rivers moored at a pier at Port Canaveral, Florida, on 1 August 1993.

The contract to build L. Mendel Rivers was awarded to Newport News Shipbuilding and Dry Dock Company in Newport News, Virginia, on 1 July 1969 and her keel was laid down there on 26 June 1971. She was launched on 2 June 1973, sponsored by L. Mendel Rivers' two daughters, Margaret Rivers Eastman and Marion Rivers, and commissioned on 21 December 1974.

== Service history ==
Her first deployment was to the Mediterranean Sea from January through July 1976. Between 1976 and 1995, she mainly patrolled the Mediterranean and North Atlantic. Additionally, she did three tours within the Arctic Circle and one to the North Pole.

During the 1990s, L. Mendel Rivers was fitted with a dry-deck shelter which contained a hyperbaric chamber, airlock, and vehicle hangar that allowed her to deploy SEAL Delivery Vehicles.

== Decommissioning and disposal ==
L. Mendel Rivers was decommissioned on 10 May 2001 and stricken from the Naval Vessel Register the same day. Her scrapping via the Nuclear-Powered Ship and Submarine Recycling Program at Puget Sound Naval Shipyard in Bremerton, Washington, was completed on 19 July 2002.

== Commemoration ==
L. Mendel Rivers' ship's plaque is on display at the Patriots Point Naval and Maritime Museum in Mount Pleasant, South Carolina. the L. Mendel Rivers' ship's patch is on display at the Submarine Force Library and Museum in Groton, Connecticut, with the patches of all Sturgeon-class attack submarine.

== In popular culture ==
Archive footage of the vessel was used in the TV series The Six Million Dollar Man's Season Six opener Sharks.

USS L. Mendel Rivers is one of the playable Sturgeon-class submarines in the 2017 video game Cold Waters.
