= USS Portsmouth (SSN-707) =

Los Angeles-class nuclear-powered attack submarine of the US Navy

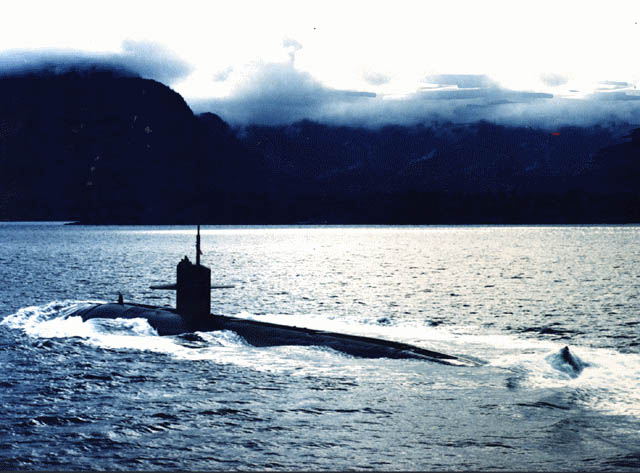

History

United States
- Name: USS Portsmouth
- Awarded: 10 December 1973
- Builder: General Dynamics Corporation
- Laid down: 8 May 1980
- Launched: 18 September 1982
- Commissioned: 1 October 1983
- Decommissioned: 10 September 2004
- Stricken: 10 September 2004
- Home port: Groton, Connecticut
- Fate: Stricken, To be disposed of by submarine recycling
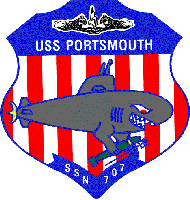
- Badge

General characteristics
- Class & type: Los Angeles-class submarine
- Displacement: 5,755 tons light, 6,129 tons full, 374 tons dead
- Length: 110.3 m (361 ft 11 in)
- Beam: 10 m (32 ft 10 in)
- Draft: 9.7 m (31 ft 10 in)
- Propulsion: S6G nuclear reactor
- Complement: 12 officers, 98 enlisted
- Armament: 4 × 21 in (533 mm) torpedo tubes; MK.48 ADCAP torpedoes; Tomahawk Land Attack cruise missile (TLAM); MK60 mines; MK67 SLMM mines

Service record
- Part of: United States Fifth Fleet (1995–1996); United States Seventh Fleet (1997–?)
- Operations: Operation Urgent Fury
- Awards: Armed Forces Expeditionary Medal; Navy Expeditionary Medal

USS Portsmouth (SSN-707) is a decommissioned Los Angeles-class submarine. She was the fourth ship of the United States Navy to be named for Portsmouth, New Hampshire.

== History ==
The contract to build her was awarded to the Electric Boat Division of General Dynamics Corporation in Groton, Connecticut on 10 December 1973 and her keel was laid down on 8 May 1980. She was launched on 18 September 1982 sponsored by Mrs. Helen Poe Goodrich, and commissioned on 1 October 1983, with Captain Donald M. Olson in command. The ceremony took place at the Portsmouth Naval Shipyard in Kittery, Maine, just east of Portsmouth, New Hampshire, her namesake city.

Three weeks after commissioning Portsmouth began her first mission, supporting rescue operations in Grenada. She was awarded the Armed Forces Expeditionary Medal for that action.

In 1984 Portsmouth entered her homeport of Groton, Connecticut, which she left for her permanent homeport at Ballast Point Submarine Base in San Diego. En route she transited through the Panama Canal and made a quick dash south for her first transit across the equator.

In 1985 Portsmouth commenced her first Western Pacific operations that included port-calls in Japan and Australia and became the first American nuclear-powered warship to visit Fiji. Years later she became the first to make a liberty call to communist Chinese reunified Hong Kong.

On 10 September 2004 Portsmouth was decommissioned at Norfolk, Virginia and was inactivated at Norfolk Naval Shipyard in nearby Portsmouth, Virginia, her other namesake city. She entered the Ship-Submarine Recycling Program at Puget Sound Naval Shipyard in Bremerton, Washington. While the submarine was only halfway through her design lifespan, her reactor core required refueling. Decommissioning was chosen as a cost-saving measure.

== Awards ==
The ship deployed to 5th Fleet with the Nimitz Battle Group in 1995–1996. She was awarded the Navy Meritorious Unit Commendation (MUC) and the COMSUBRON 11 Battle "E".

The ship deployed to 7th Fleet in 1997. The crew was awarded the Navy Expeditionary Medal. Upon return to homeport, the ship was again awarded the COMSUBRON 11 Battle "E", judged the most battle effective submarine in her squadron.
