= USS Tunny (SSN-682) =

Submarine of the United States

History

United States
- Name: USS Tunny
- Namesake: The tunny, any of several oceanic fishes resembling the tuna
- Ordered: 25 June 1968
- Builder: Ingalls Shipbuilding, Pascagoula, Mississippi
- Laid down: 22 May 1970
- Launched: 10 June 1972
- Sponsored by: Mrs. Lola Aiken
- Commissioned: 26 January 1974
- Decommissioned: 13 March 1998
- Stricken: 13 March 1998
- Home port: Pearl Harbor, Hawaii
- Motto: Illegitimi non carborundum
- Fate: Scrapping via Ship and Submarine Recycling Program began 1 October 1997, completed 27 October 1998

General characteristics
- Class & type: Sturgeon-class attack submarine
- Displacement: 4,460 long tons (4,532 t) surfaced; 4,960 long tons (5,040 t) submerged
- Length: 302 ft (92 m)
- Beam: 31.7 ft (9.7 m)
- Draft: 29.2 ft (8.9 m)
- Propulsion: S5W2 Nuclear Reactor 30,400 shp (23 MW); 1 shaft; Steam (600 psi) NSFO
- Speed: Approx. 15 knots (28 km/h; 17 mph) surfaced; Approx. 30 knots (56 km/h; 35 mph) submerged
- Test depth: 1,300 feet (400 meters)
- Complement: 110
- Armament: 4 × 21-inch (533 mm) torpedo tubes; Mark 48 torpedoes; UGM-84A/C Harpoon missiles; Tomahawk cruise missiles; UUM-44A SUBROC missiles; Naval mines

USS Tunny (SSN-682), a Sturgeon-class attack submarine, was the second submarine of the United States Navy to be named for the tunny, any of several oceanic fishes resembling the tuna.

== Construction and commissioning ==
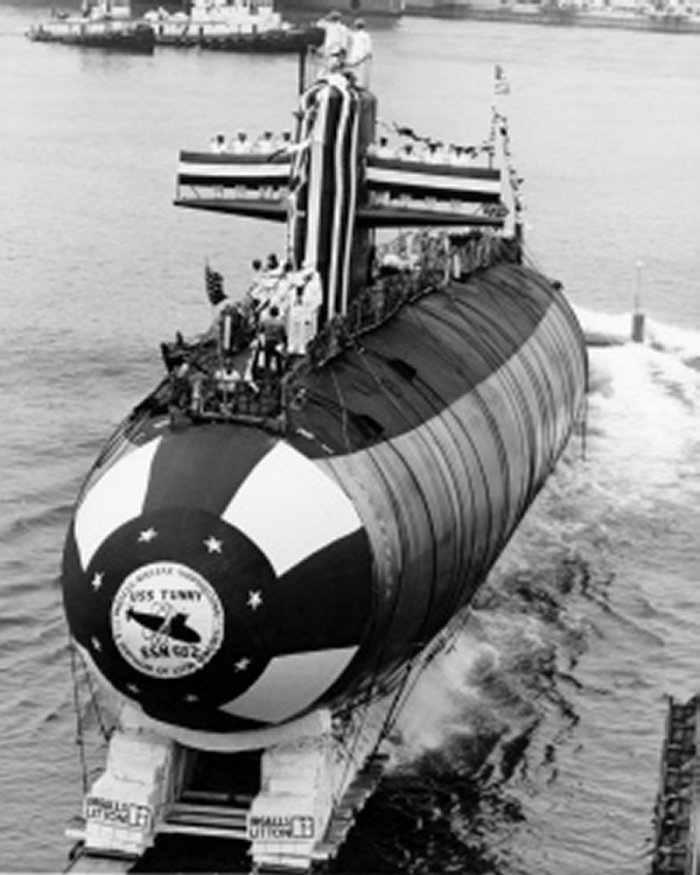
Tunny is launched into the Pascagoula River on 10 June 1972 at Pascagoula, Mississippi.

The contract forTunny's construction was awarded on 25 June 1968 and her keel was laid down on 22 May 1970 at Pascagoula, Mississippi, by the Ingalls Shipbuilding Division of Litton Industries. She was launched on 10 June 1972, sponsored by Mrs. Lola Aiken, and commissioned on 26 January 1974 at her home port, Charleston, South Carolina.

== Service history ==
=== 1974 ===
Tunny remained at Charleston until March 1974, when she moved to Groton, Connecticut, for two weeks of in-port training at the submarine base. Between March and June 1974, she conducted shakedown training in the West Indies and along the United States East Coast. From June to August 1974, she conducted operations out of Charleston before heading north to the Portsmouth Naval Shipyard at Kittery, Maine, where she began post-shakedown overhaul on 12 August 1974. She completed repairs on 5 October 1974 and headed back to Charleston, where she resumed normal training operations.

=== 1975 ===
In February 1975, Tunny began preparations for her first deployment to the Mediterranean Sea. She stood out of Charleston on 6 March 1975 and headed across the Atlantic Ocean. She came under operational control of the United States Sixth Fleet on 16 March 1975. During the first part of her tour in the Mediterranean, she operated with Task Force 60, conducting antisubmarine warfare exercises with the other ships of the task force. Following refit and upkeep alongside a submarine tender in June and early July 1975 at Santo Stefano, Sardinia, Italy, Tunny rejoined the Sixth Fleet as a unit of Task Force 69 and resumed antisubmarine warfare training. After participating in a major Sixth Fleet exercise late in July and early in August 1975, she departed the Mediterranean for home. She changed operational control from the Sixth Fleet to the United States Atlantic Fleet Submarine Force on 17 August 1975 and arrived in Charleston, concluding her deployment, on 29 August 1975. After a routine post-deployment standdown in September and repairs and alterations Charleston Naval Shipyard at Charleston in October and November, she resumed operations—mostly attack submarine training—out of Charleston on 20 November 1975.

=== 1976 ===
Attack submarine training along the South Carolina and Florida coasts occupied her time during January 1976. February 1976 brought inspections and examinations and, in March 1976, she participated in two special operations designed to help develop and evaluate submarine tactics. In May 1976, Tunny began preparations for her second tour of duty with the Sixth Fleet but did not embark upon that assignment for over two months. In the meantime, she conducted an exercise in naval mine warfare in June 1976. Finally, on 26 July 1976, she departed Charleston on her way to the Mediterranean. Following a visit to Lisbon, Portugal, she joined the Sixth Fleet on 11 August 1976. After a month of antisubmarine warfare training, highlighted by Exercise "National Week XXI", she put into Santo Stefano for a month of upkeep alongside submarine tender USS Howard W. Gilmore (AS-16). In October 1976, she returned to sea for antisubmarine warfare training operations punctuated periodically with a visit to Naples, Italy, or upkeep at Santo Stefano. That routine continued until 11 December 1976, when she departed Santo Stefano to return to the United States. Arriving in Charleston on 22 December 1976, she commenced a combination of Christmas holiday leave and upkeep and a routine post-deployment standdown.

=== 1977 ===
January 1977 found Tunny undergoing an extensive upkeep following her Mediterranean deployment. She then resumed operations off the U.S. East Coast which extended through the spring and summer months. In mid-September 1977, she commenced a two-month period of repairs and alterations at the Norfolk Naval Shipyard in Portsmouth, Virginia, which was concluded in late November, followed by a short sea trial period. Following refresher training at the Submarine School at Naval Submarine Base New London at New London, Connecticut, Tunny returned to Charleston.

=== 1978 ===
Tunny spent January and part of February 1978 preparing for a North Atlantic Ocean deployment which commenced in late February and concluded in late April. Tunny made stops in Dunoon, Scotland and Portland, England.

In July 1978, Tunny's home port was changed to Pearl Harbor, Hawaii. She transited the Panama Canal and briefly crossed the equator on her voyage to Pearl Harbor, where she arrived on 19 August 1978. Tunny was assigned to Submarine Squadron 1, and devoted the remainder of 1978 to operations in the Hawaiian Islands in preparation for a 1979 deployment to the Western Pacific.

=== 1979–1997 ===
Tunny departed for Western Pacific at the beginning of 1979. She visited various ports during the deployment, including Amphoe Sattahip in Thailand, and Orote Point in Guam. She also entered the Indian Ocean, where she visited the U.S. naval base at Diego Garcia in the British Indian Ocean Territory. She was a guest of the Royal Australian Navy when she visited HMAS Stirling, the administrative center of the Royal Australian Navy's main naval base on the west coast of Australia, located on Garden Island just off the coast of Western Australia near the city of Perth, and Tunny's crew participated in the ANZAC Day Parade in April 1979. Tunny completed her six-month deployment to the Western Pacific when she returned to Pearl Harbor in June 1979.

== Decommissioning and disposal ==
Tunny was deactivated while still in commission on 1 October 1997, and was both decommissioned and stricken from the Naval Vessel Register on 13 March 1998. Her scrapping via the U.S. Navy's Nuclear-Powered Ship and Submarine Recycling Program began on 1 October 1997 and was completed on 27 October 1998.
