= USS Sam Houston (SSBN-609) =

Submarine of the United States

USS Sam Houston (SSBN-609/SSN-609)
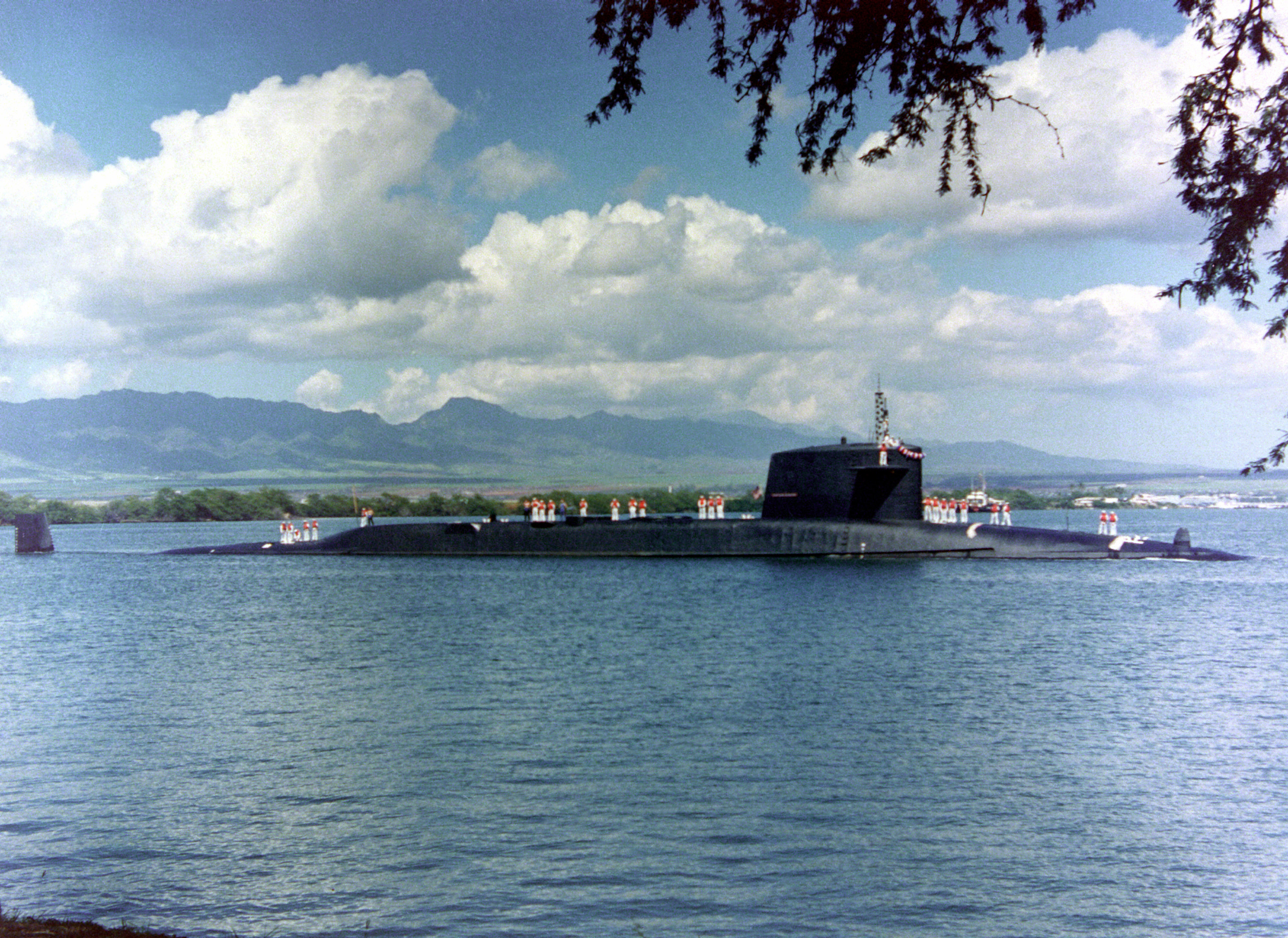
- USS Sam Houston (SSBN-609)

History

United States
- Namesake: Sam Houston (1793–1863), President (1836–1838, 1841–1844) of the Republic of Texas
- Ordered: 1 July 1959
- Builder: Newport News Shipbuilding and Dry Dock Company
- Laid down: 28 December 1959
- Launched: 2 February 1961
- Sponsored by: Mrs. John B. Connally
- Commissioned: 6 March 1962
- Decommissioned: 6 September 1991
- Reclassified: SSN-609 10 November 1980
- Stricken: 6 September 1991
- Fate: Recycled via Ship and Submarine Recycling Program; completed 3 February 1992

General characteristics
- Class & type: Ethan Allen-class submarine
- Type: Ballistic Missile Submarine
- Displacement: approx. 7,900 tons submerged
- Length: 410 feet 4 inches (125.07 m)
- Beam: 33.1 feet (10.1 m)
- Draft: 27 feet 5 inches (8.36 m)
- Propulsion: S5W reactor – two geared steam turbines – one shaft
- Speed: 16 knots surfaced, 21 knots (24 mph; 39 km/h) submerged
- Test depth: 1,300 feet (400 m)
- Complement: 12 Officers and 128 Enlisted (two crews Blue and Gold)
- Armament: 16 fleet ballistic missiles, 4 x 21 inches (530 mm) torpedo tubes

USS Sam Houston (SSBN-609/SSN-609), an Ethan Allen-class submarine, was the second ship of the United States Navy to be named after Sam Houston (1793–1863), president of the Republic of Texas (1836–1838, 1841–1844). Sam Houston was the US Navy's seventh ballistic missile submarine.

== Ship's history ==
Her keel was laid down on 28 December 1959 by the Newport News Shipbuilding and Dry Dock Company of Newport News, Virginia. She was launched on 2 February 1961 sponsored by Texas First Lady Idanell Brill (Nellie ) Connally, wife of Governor John Connally and commissioned on 6 March 1962 with Captain W. P. Willis Jr. commanding the Blue Crew and Commander Jack H. Hawkins commanding the Gold Crew.

Following sea trials, Sam Houston's Blue Crew fired her first Polaris missile on 25 April 1962 off Cape Canaveral, Florida. The Gold Crew then took over, completed its first missile firing on 11 May 1962, and then departed from Cape Canaveral for its own shakedown training.

On her first patrol, Sam Houston, manned by the Blue Crew, operated continuously submerged for 48 days and two hours, then moored alongside the submarine tender USS Proteus (AS-19) in Holy Loch, Scotland. Following upkeep, the Gold Crew commenced its first patrol on 25 December 1962, returning to Holy Loch in February 1963. The crews were again alternated, and Sam Houston departed on her third patrol in March 1963. On this patrol, she was the first fleet ballistic missile submarine to enter the Mediterranean Sea, where she joined North Atlantic Treaty Organization (NATO) forces. With the two crews alternating every 90 days, Sam Houston completed six successful deterrent patrols by the end of 1963.

By the end of 1964, Sam Houston had completed ten patrols. During 1965, she completed four additional deterrent patrols. During 1966, she completed three more patrols, including her longest, which lasted 71 days. On 10 August 1966, she returned to the United States for the first time since her deployment to Holy Loch in 1962 and commenced a major overhaul at the Portsmouth Naval Shipyard at Kittery, Maine. On 30 October 1967, she got underway for sea trials, and, a month later, her Blue Crew began shakedown training. In January 1968, the Gold Crew conducted shakedown operations. Following further tests, she got under way for her 18th deterrent patrol, and put into Holy Loch on 25 May 1968. By the end of 1968, she was on her 21st patrol. During 1969, Sam Houston completed her 22nd through 24th patrols. In 1970, she continued to operate with Submarine Squadron 14 until shifting to the Mediterranean on 9 August 1970 to join Submarine Squadron 16.

She operated out of her advanced base at Rota, Spain, until October 1972. On 27 November, she entered Charleston Naval Shipyard and began an extended in-port period, which included regular overhaul and the updating of her weapons and propulsion systems. As of May 1974, Sam Houston was still in port at Charleston, South Carolina.

In February 1975 USS Sam Houston completed sea trials and overhaul at Charleston NSY. Change of Command ceremonies were held on the USS Hunley at Weapons Station Charleston SC and the blue crew assumed command of the ship. After both crews completed post overhaul inspections Sam Houston headed for her Pacific assignment in late July 1975. Gold crew under the command of J.P Wiekert transited the Panama Canal in August 1975 with stops in San Diego, Weapons Station Bremerton arriving at Pearl Harbor in early October 1975. Blue crew assumed command at Pearl Harbor, Hawaii and performed Sam Houston's first Pacific deterrent patrol No. 37 transiting the boat to Guam. Sam Houston performed 14 patrols, No. 37 – No. 50, between 1975 and 1979 operating out of Guam. During these patrols Sam Houston made mid-patrol stops in South Korea and Hawaii.

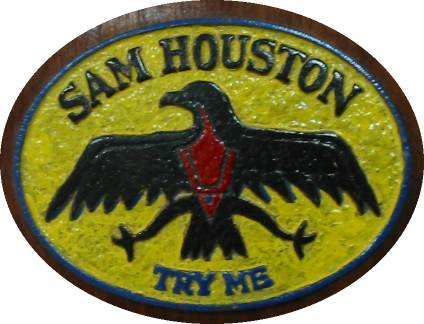

In 1981, in compliance with the SALT I treaty, Sam Houston's ballistic missile section was deactivated. Concrete blocks were placed in the missile tubes and the missile fire-control system was removed, as was one of her inertial navigation systems. Sam Houston was reclassified as an attack submarine with hull number SSN-609 on 10 November 1980 and retained primarily for training, antisubmarine warfare exercises, and other secondary duties.

From September 1982 to September 1985, Sam Houston, along with her sister ship USS John Marshall (SSBN-611), was modified at Puget Sound Naval Shipyard at Bremerton, Washington, as an amphibious transport to carry frogmen or commandos. This included the installation of additional troop berthing, the removal of some ballistic missile tube bases, and the conversion of other ballistic missile tubes into air locks and stowage for equipment. She was fitted with two dry deck shelters (DDSs) abaft her sail. These, which housed United States Navy SEAL team Swimmer Delivery Vehicles, allowed her to act as a SEAL mother ship.

On 29 April 1988, Sam Houston ran aground on Fox Island, Washington.

Deactivated on 1 March 1991 while still in commission, Sam Houston began the Nuclear Powered Ship and Submarine Recycling Program at Puget Sound Naval Shipyard the same day. She was formally decommissioned and stricken from the Naval Vessel Register on 6 September 1991 and finished the recycling program on 3 February 1992, when she was officially listed as scrapped.
