= USS Ethan Allen (SSBN-608) =

Submarine of the United States

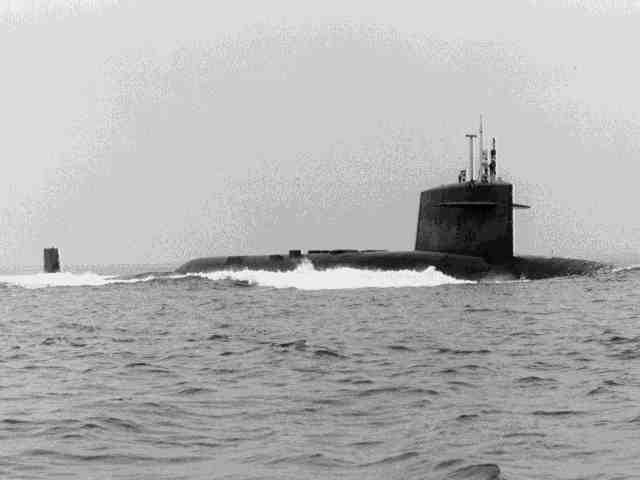
- USS Ethan Allen (SSBN-608)

History

United States
- Namesake: Ethan Allen (1738–1789), a hero of the American Revolutionary War
- Ordered: 17 July 1958
- Builder: General Dynamics Electric Boat
- Laid down: 14 September 1959
- Launched: 22 November 1960
- Sponsored by: Mrs. Robert H. Hopkins
- Commissioned: 8 August 1961
- Decommissioned: 31 March 1983
- Stricken: 2 April 1983
- Fate: Recycling via the Ship and Submarine Recycling Program completed 30 July 1999

General characteristics
- Class & type: Ethan Allen-class Fleet Ballistic Missile (FBM) submarine (hull design SCB-180)
- Displacement: 6,955 long tons (7,067 t) (surfaced); 7,880 long tons (8,010 t) (submerged)
- Length: 410 feet 4 inches (125.07 m)
- Beam: 33.1 feet (10.1 m)
- Draft: 27 feet 5 inches (8.36 m)
- Propulsion: S5W reactor; two General Electric geared steam turbines; 15,000 shp (11,000 kW); one shaft
- Speed: 16 kn (18 mph; 30 km/h) (surfaced); 21 kn (24 mph; 39 km/h) (submerged)
- Test depth: 1,300 ft (396 m)
- Complement: 12 officers and 128 enlisted men (each of two crews, Blue and Gold)
- Armament: 16 Polaris ballistic missiles; 4 x 21 in (533 mm) torpedo tubes (bow), 12 torpedoes

Universal newsreel about USS Ethan Allen

USS Ethan Allen (SSBN-608), lead ship of her class, was the second ship of the United States Navy to be named for American Revolutionary War hero Ethan Allen.

Ethan Allen's keel was laid down by the Electric Boat Corporation of Groton, Connecticut. She was launched on 22 November 1960, sponsored by Margaret Hitchcock (Sims) Hopkins, great-great-great-granddaughter of Ethan Allen and wife of Robert H. Hopkins. The ship was commissioned on 8 August 1961, with Captain Paul L. Lacy, Jr., commanding Blue Crew and Commander W. W. Behrens, Jr., commanding the Gold Crew.

Ethan Allen (Navy hull design SCB 180) was the first submarine designed as a ballistic missile launch platform. (The earlier George Washington class were converted attack submarines.) She was constructed from HY80 steel (high yield, 80,000 psi (550,000 kPa) yield strength), and was fitted with the Mark 2 Mod 3 Ships Inertial Navigation System (SINS). At launch, she was outfitted with Polaris A-2 (UGM-27B) submarine-launched ballistic missiles (SLBMs) and Mark 16 Mod 6 torpedoes; the torpedo fire control system was the Mark 112 Mod 2. The A-2s would be replaced with Polaris A-3s and but maintained the high pressure air ejection launch gear throughout the rest of her career as a FBM. The fire control system was upgraded to the Mark 80 fire control systems during 1965, while in the 1970s these would be replaced with Polaris A-3Ts. In addition, Ethan Allen was updated with Mark 37 and (later) Mark 48 torpedoes during her operational lifetime.

On 6 May 1962, Ethan Allen, under Captain Lacy and with Admiral Levering Smith aboard, launched a nuclear-armed Polaris missile that detonated at 11,000 feet (3.4 km) over the South Pacific. That test (Frigate Bird), part of Operation Dominic, was the only complete operational test of an American strategic missile. The warhead was said to hit "right in the pickle barrel". USS Carbonero and USS Medregal participated in the test, about 30 miles from the impact point.

To make room for the new Ohio-class ballistic missile submarines within the limitations of SALT II, Ethan Allen's missile tubes (and those of other George Washington and Ethan Allen-class ballistic missile submarines) were disabled, and she was redesignated an attack submarine (hull number SSN-608) on 1 September 1980.

Ethan Allen was decommissioned on 31 March 1983 and stricken from the Naval Vessel Register on 2 April 1983. Her hulk was tied up in Bremerton, Washington, until entering the Nuclear Powered Ship-Submarine Recycling Program. Recycling was completed on 30 July 1999..

In Tom Clancy's novel The Hunt for Red October (published 1984), the USS Ethan Allen is blown up as a decoy in order to convince the Russian Navy that the Red October has been destroyed. (This plotline doesn't feature in the later film adaptation.)
