= USS Silversides (SSN-679) =

Submarine of the United States

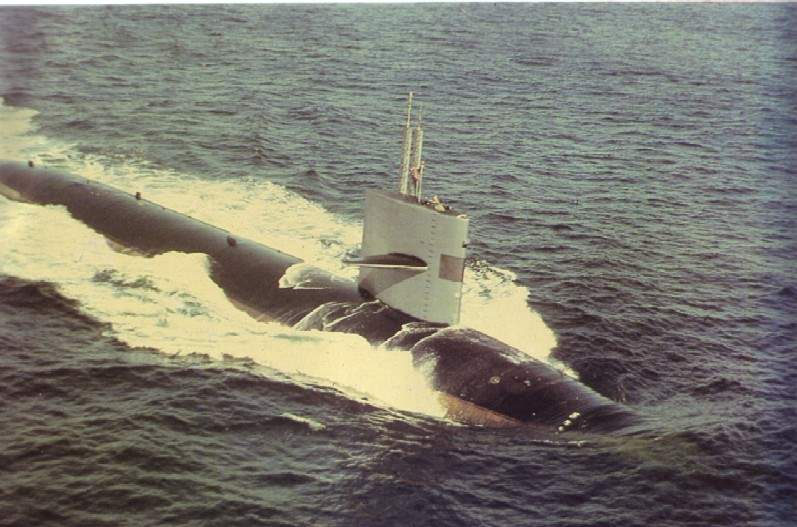
- USS Silversides (SSN-679), possibly during her sea trials off New England in 1972.

History

United States
- Name: USS Silversides
- Namesake: The silverside
- Ordered: 25 June 1968
- Builder: Electric Boat Division of General Dynamics Corporation, Groton, Connecticut
- Laid down: 13 October 1969
- Launched: 4 June 1971
- Sponsored by: Mrs. John H. Chafee
- Commissioned: 5 May 1972
- Decommissioned: 21 July 1994
- Stricken: 21 July 1994
- Motto: Veni Vidi Vici ("I Came, I Saw, I Conquered")
- Fate: Scrapping via Ship and Submarine Recycling Program begun 1 October 2000, completed 1 October 2001

General characteristics
- Class & type: Sturgeon-class attack submarine
- Displacement: 3,978 long tons (4,042 t) light; 4,270 long tons (4,339 t) full; 292 long tons (297 t) dead
- Length: 302 ft 3 in (92.13 m)
- Beam: 31 ft 8 in (9.65 m)
- Draft: 28 ft 8 in (8.74 m)
- Installed power: 15,000 shaft horsepower (11.2 megawatts)
- Propulsion: One S5W nuclear reactor, two steam turbines, one screw
- Speed: 15 knots (28 km/h; 17 mph) surfaced; 25 knots (46 km/h; 29 mph) submerged
- Test depth: 1,300 feet (396 meters)
- Complement: 109 (14 officers, 95 enlisted men)
- Armament: 4 × 21-inch (533 mm) torpedo tubes

USS Silversides (SSN-679), a Sturgeon-class attack submarine, was the second ship of the United States Navy to be named for the silverside, a small fish marked with a silvery stripe along each side of its body.

== Construction and commissioning ==
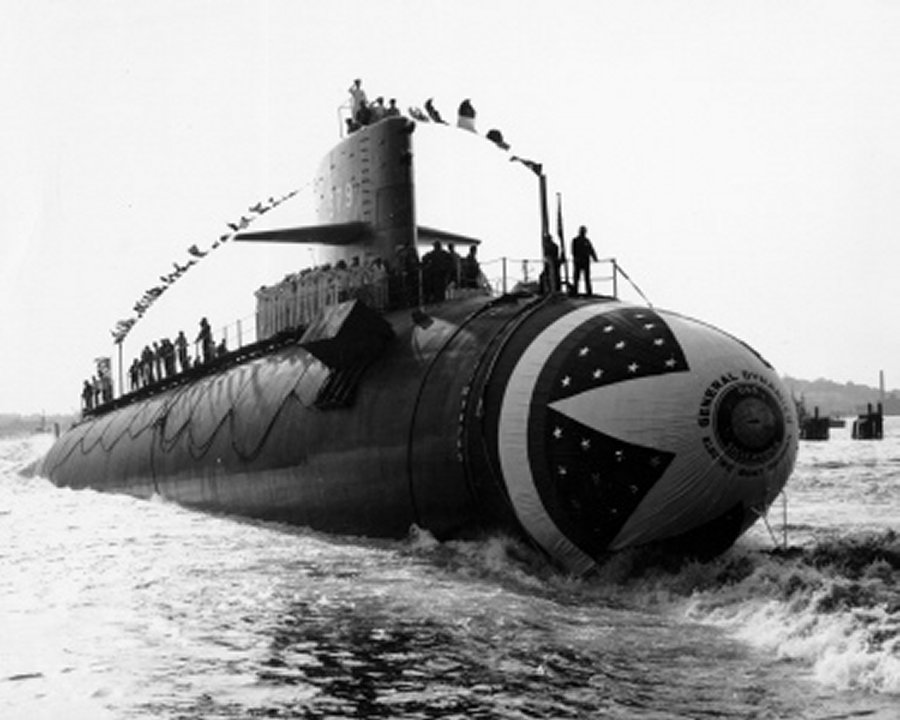
Silversides being launched at Groton, Connecticut, on 4 June 1971.

The contract to build Silversides was awarded to the Electric Boat Division of General Dynamics Corporation in Groton, Connecticut, on 25 June 1968 and her keel was laid down on 13 October 1969. She was launched on 4 June 1971, sponsored by Mrs. John H. Chafee, wife of then-Secretary of the Navy John H. Chafee (1922–1999), and commissioned on 5 May 1972.

== Service history ==
Following shakedown in the Atlantic Ocean and the Caribbean, Silversides began operations in the Atlantic with her home port at Naval Station Charleston at Charleston, South Carolina.

In August 1973, the ship went on its first deployment to the Mediterranean for six months. Between October and November, she participated in special operations associated with the Yom Kippur War . The ship received the Battle Efficiency ''E'' for the year.

In September and October 1974, she was sent on her first North Atlantic deployment.

Silversides went into drydock at Norfolk Naval Shipyard in Portsmouth, Virginia, in January 1977, at which time her home port was changed from Charleston to Naval Station Norfolk at Norfolk, Virginia. During this overhaul, the ship received an upgraded digital fire control system and the AN/BQQ5 Sonar system.

On 11 October 1981, "Silversides" surfaced at the North Pole for the first time.

In the autumn of 1984, Silversides left Norfolk for a scheduled refueling overhaul at Puget Sound Naval Shipyard in Bremerton, Washington, entering drydock there in late November 1984. The refueling overhaul was completed in August 1986, and later in 1986 she returned to Norfolk.

In the autumn of 1989, Silversides departed Norfolk and voyaged north into the Arctic, surfaced at the North Pole for the second time, proceeded out of the Arctic Ocean into the Pacific Ocean, participated in United States Pacific Fleet exercises, made port calls in Hawaii and California, and returned to Norfolk via the Panama Canal, becoming only the second submarine to circumnavigate North America.

In Jan 1994, Silversides' home port was changed from Norfolk to Pearl Harbor, Hawaii, in anticipation of her decommissioning there.

== Decommissioning and disposal ==
Silversides was decommissioned at Pearl Harbor on 21 July 1994 and stricken from the Naval Vessel Register the same day. Her scrapping via the Nuclear-Powered Ship and Submarine Recycling Program at Puget Sound Naval Shipyard began on 1 October 2000 and was completed on 1 October 2001.
