= USS Norfolk (SSN-714) =

Los Angeles-class nuclear-powered attack submarine of the US Navy

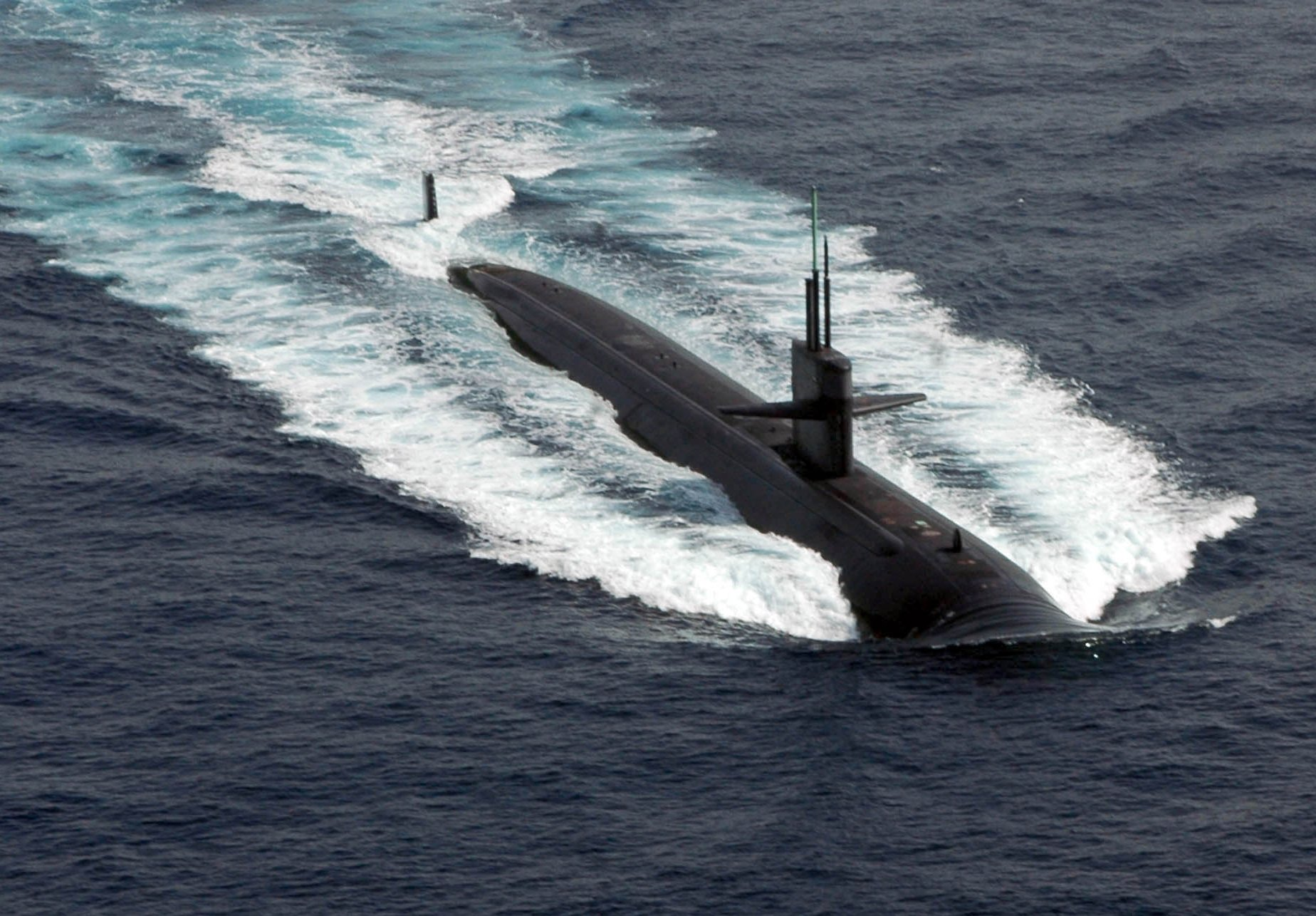
- USS Norfolk in 2008

History

United States
- Name: Norfolk
- Namesake: Norfolk, Virginia
- Awarded: 20 February 1976
- Builder: Newport News Shipbuilding
- Laid down: 1 August 1979
- Launched: 31 October 1981
- Sponsored by: Mrs. Caspar Weinberger
- Commissioned: 21 May 1983
- Decommissioned: 11 December 2014
- Stricken: 11 December 2014
- Home port: Norfolk, Virginia
- Motto: Vi per Concordiam; (Latin: "Strength through Unity")
- Status: Being defueled
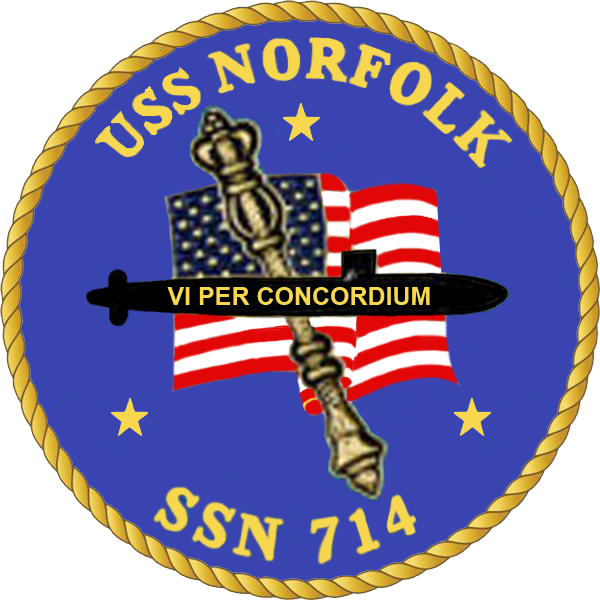
- Badge

General characteristics
- Class & type: Los Angeles-class submarine
- Displacement: 5,751 tons light, 6,126 tons full, 375 tons dead
- Length: 110.3 m (361 ft 11 in)
- Beam: 10 m (32 ft 10 in)
- Draft: 9.7 m (31 ft 10 in)
- Propulsion: S6G nuclear reactor
- Complement: 12 officers, 98 enlisted
- Armament: 4 × 21 in (533 mm) torpedo tubes

USS Norfolk (SSN-714), a Los Angeles-class attack submarine, was the third ship of the United States Navy to be named for Norfolk, Virginia.

== History ==
The contract to build her was awarded to Newport News Shipbuilding and Dry Dock Company in Newport News, Virginia on 20 February 1976 and her keel was laid down on 1 August 1979. She was launched on 31 October 1981 sponsored by Mrs. Caspar Weinberger, and commissioned on 21 May 1983.

Norfolk conducted extensive trials of the next-generation torpedo, ADCAP, as well as advanced and secret acoustic experiments. The ship also made an active deployment during one of the final spurts of activity from the declining Soviet navy. On 23 July 1988 Norfolk fired the first ADCAP torpedo, sinking the ex-USS Jonas Ingram.

On 17 January 1989, Norfolk collided with the combat stores ship USS San Diego in the Thimble Shoals channel as both vessels were headed to sea. Norfolk struck her starboard side into the port side of San Diego. There were no injuries, but both ships suffered damage. Norfolk's commanding officer was subsequently relieved of command. The sub made a surface transit to Naval Submarine Base Kings Bay for drydocking and repairs within a few days, and San Diego required dry dock repairs that were completed 10 April 1989. As a result of this collision, COMSUBLANT issued orders limiting submarine speed and passing activities while in the restricted waters of the Hampton Roads channels.

On 25 August 2004, Norfolk returned to Naval Station Norfolk after a 22-month Engineering Refueling Overhaul (ERO) at Portsmouth Naval Shipyard in Kittery, Maine.

Norfolk was decommissioned on 11 December 2014 at her homeport of Naval Station Norfolk in Virginia. This ship is in the process of being defueled.
