= List of ship commissionings in 1971 =

The list of ship commissionings in 1971 includes a chronological list of all ships commissioned in 1971.

	Operator	Ship	Flag	Class and type	Pennant	Other notes
8 January	United States Navy	Bluefish		Sturgeon-class submarine	SSN-675	
16 January	United States Navy	Mount Whitney		Blue Ridge-class command ship	LCC-20	
19 January	Royal Australian Navy	Torrens		River-class destroyer escort	DE 53	
23 January	United States Navy	Saginaw		Newport-class tank landing ship	LST-1188	
6 March	United States Navy	Trenton		Austin-class amphibious transport dock	LPD-14	
12 March	United States Navy	Billfish		Sturgeon-class submarine	SSN-676	
27 March	United States Navy	San Bernardino		Newport-class tank landing ship	LST-1189	
27 March	United States Navy	Pensacola		Anchorage-class dock landing ship	LSD-38	
24 April	United States Navy	Joseph Hewes		Knox-class frigate	FF-1078	
22 May	United States Navy	Bowen		Knox-class frigate	FF-1079	
3 June	Sessan Linjen	Prinsessan Desirée	Sweden	Ferry		
4 June	United States Navy	Boulder		Newport-class tank landing ship	LST-1190	
8 July	Royal Caribbean Cruise Line	Nordic Prince	Norway	Song of Norway-class cruise ship		
10 July	United States Navy	Ponce		Austin-class amphibious transport dock	LPD-15	
23 July	United States Navy	Fanning		Knox-class frigate	FF-1076	
31 July	United States Navy	Reasoner		Knox-class frigate	FF-1063	
14 August	United States Navy	Paul		Knox-class frigate	FF-1080	
1 September	United States Navy	Spartanburg County		Newport-class tank landing ship	LST-1192	
11 September	United States Navy	Pintado		Sturgeon-class submarine	SSN-672	
18 September	United States Navy	Aylwin		Knox-class frigate	FF-1081	
16 October	United States Navy	Fairfax County		Newport-class tank landing ship	LST-1193	
30 October	United States Navy	Elmer Montgomery		Knox-class frigate	FF-1082	
20 November	United States Navy	Flint		Kilauea-class ammunition ship	AE-32	
17 December	United States Navy	Archerfish		Sturgeon-class submarine	SSN-678	
18 December	United States Navy	Cook		Knox-class frigate	FF-1083	
31 December	People's Liberation Army Navy	Jinan		Type 051 destroyer	105	date of initial operational capability
31 December	Soviet Navy	Bodryy		Project 1135 large anti-submarine ship	503	
