= USS Archerfish (SSN-678) =

United States Navy Sturgeon-class attack submarine

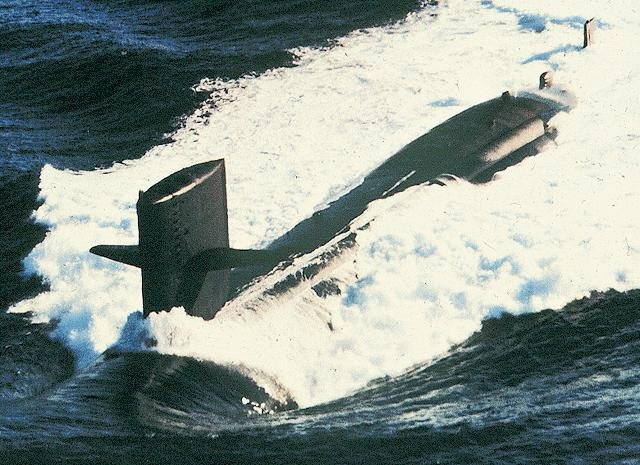
- USS Archerfish (SSN-678)

History

United States
- Name: USS Archerfish
- Namesake: The archerfish (Toxotidae Toxotes)
- Ordered: 25 June 1968
- Builder: Electric Boat Division of General Dynamics Corporation, Groton, Connecticut
- Laid down: 19 June 1969
- Launched: 16 January 1971
- Sponsored by: Miss Mary Conover Warner
- Commissioned: 17 December 1971
- Decommissioned: 31 March 1998
- Stricken: 31 March 1998
- Fate: Scrapping via Ship and Submarine Recycling Program completed 6 November 1998
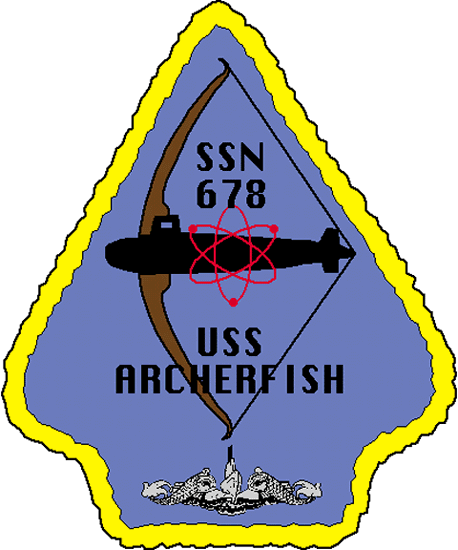
- Badge

General characteristics
- Class & type: Sturgeon-class attack submarine
- Displacement: 3,978 long tons (4,042 t) light; 4,270 long tons (4,339 t) full; 292 long tons (297 t) dead
- Length: 302 ft 3 in (92.13 m)
- Beam: 31 ft 8 in (9.65 m)
- Draft: 28 ft 8 in (8.74 m)
- Installed power: 15,000 shaft horsepower (11.2 megawatts)
- Propulsion: One S5W nuclear reactor, two steam turbines, one screw
- Speed: Over 20 knots (37 km/h; 23 mph) surfaced; over 30 knots (56 km/h; 35 mph) submerged
- Range: Unlimited
- Test depth: 1,320 feet (400 meters)
- Complement: 112 (14 officers, 98 enlisted men)
- Armament: 4 × 21-inch (533 mm) amidship torpedo tubes; Mark 48 torpedoes; UGM-84A/C Harpoon cruise missiles; Tomahawk land-attack cruise missile; Tomahawk antiship cruise missile; 15 torpedo reloads plus 4 Harpoons or up to 8 Tomahawks instead of equivalent of number of torpedoes or Harpoons; Minelayer configuration: Mark 67 mobile mine or Mark 60 CAPTOR mines instead of torpedoes

USS Archerfish (SSN-678), a Sturgeon-class attack submarine, was the second ship of the United States Navy to be named for the archerfish, a family (Toxotidae) of fish notable for their habit of preying on insects and other animals by shooting them down with squirts of water from the mouth.

== Construction and commissioning ==
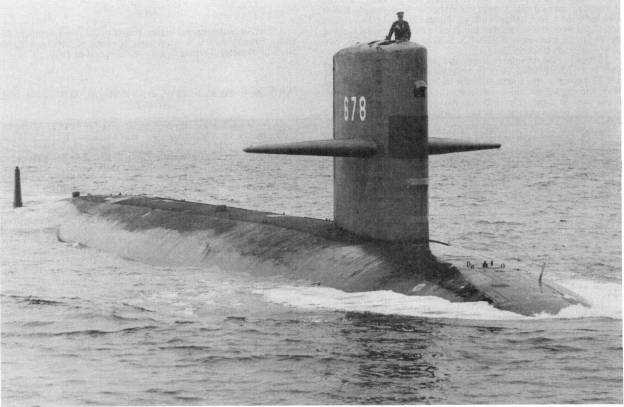
USS Archerfish

The contract to build Archerfish was awarded on 25 June 1968 and her keel was laid down on 19 June 1969 at Groton, Connecticut, by the Electric Boat Division of the General Dynamics Corporation. She was launched on 16 January 1971, sponsored by Miss Mary Conover Warner, and commissioned at her home port, New London, Connecticut, on 17 December 1971.

== Service history ==
=== 1971–1972 ===
Following her commissioning, Archerfish proceeded to Newport, Rhode Island, in late January 1972 and then to the Caribbean Sea for shakedown training. She held acoustic sea trials in Exuma Sound in the Bahama Islands and weapons systems acceptance trials at Roosevelt Roads off Puerto Rico, and at St. Croix in the United States Virgin Islands. She carried out tests off the Bahamas in April and May 1972.

From 5 to 15 June 1972, Archerfish participated in North Atlantic Treaty Organization (NATO) Exercise "Pink Lace" in the mid-Atlantic Ocean. In August 1972, she took part in Antisubmarine Warfare Exercise 1–73. On 5 September 1972, she began post-shakedown repairs and alterations in the Electric Boat Division shipyard at Groton, where she received extensive modifications and new equipment. She left the shipyard on 26 October and spent the rest of 1972 in local operations and preparation for her first overseas deployment.

=== 1973 ===
On 6 January 1973, Archerfish left Groton and shaped a course for the Mediterranean Sea. During her deployment there, she conducted two special operations and visited Rota, Spain, and Naples, Italy. Her deployment concluded with her arrival at Naval Submarine Base New London, Connecticut, on 19 June 1973.

Archerfish got underway again in August 1973, bound for the Bahama Islands to participate in Atlantic Submarine Exercise KILO 1–74. She provided services in support of a special project under the direction of the Chief of Naval Operations in the western Atlantic Ocean during the last half of September 1973. She then traveled to a testing range off the Bahamas, held torpedo certification trials, and arrived at New London on 12 October 1973 for extensive training in preparation for her second overseas deployment.

=== 1974 ===
Archerfish left New London on 7 January 1974 for special operations in the North Atlantic Ocean. During this cruise, she visited Faslane Naval Base, Scotland, before returning to New London on 8 March 1974. Following upkeep, she voyaged to the Narragansett Bay in early May 1974 to carry out sonar evaluation projects. On 27 May 1974, she proceeded to Port Everglades, Florida, for further testing. She then continued on to the Caribbean to take part in Atlantic Submarine Exercise KILO 2–74 near the Bahamas. On 10 June 1974, Archerfish arrived at New London and began testing and evaluating new sonar equipment.

Archerfish departed New London for the Bahamas once again on 9 September 1974 to participate in Atlantic Submarine Exercise KILO 1–75. Upon its completion she took part in naval mine testing near Port Everglades. She returned to the Caribbean on 30 October 1974 for torpedo proficiency firings. From 5 to 18 November 1974, she participated in Submarine Antisubmarine Warfare Exercise 1–75 and then returned to New London for a period of leave and upkeep.

=== 1975 ===
In February and March 1975, Archerfish carried out special operations in the western Atlantic Ocean. She then took part in Operation Agate Punch, which involved the development and utilization of tactics in direct support of other ships of the United States Atlantic Fleet, from 14 to 28 April 1975. During the summer months of 1975, Archerfish carried out a deployment in the western Atlantic Ocean, which also included a port call at Halifax, Nova Scotia, Canada. In November and December 1975, she was involved in two additional tactical development exercises, RANGEX 2–76 and SECEX 3–75. She also conducted torpedo tests.

=== 1976 ===
After a period of holiday leave and upkeep and the end of 1975 and beginning of 1976, Archerfish took part in Submarine Antisubmarine Warfare Exercise 1–76 in February 1976 before commencing a deployment to the North Atlantic Ocean in March 1976. During April and May 1976, she carried out independent operations and returned to New London in June. She then moved to Portsmouth, Virginia, where she began overhaul at the Norfolk Naval Shipyard on 7 July 1976.

=== 1977–1979 ===
During her post-overhaul sea trials in May 1977, Archerfish's home port was changed from New London to Naval Station Norfolk at Norfolk, Virginia, on 12 May 1977. Archerfish began post-overhaul shakedown on 8 June 1977. She held torpedo proficiency firings and made port visits at Port Everglades and Port Canaveral, Florida. She returned to Norfolk on 8 July 1977 and began upkeep.

Archerfish got underway again on 21 August 1977 for a cruise during which she hosted a class of prospective commanding officers. She also carried out torpedo tests and made a stop at Port Everglades. Archerfish arrived at Norfolk on 6 September 1977, but quickly put to sea again on 12 September, bound for the West Indies to conduct torpedo test firings off the Bahamas and to perform special sonar tests in the Atlantic Ocean.

Upon returning to Norfolk on 28 September 1977, Archerfish began preparations for an overseas deployment in the Mediterranean. She left Norfolk on 12 December 1977 crossed the Atlantic, spent the Christmas holidays in port at Lisbon, Portugal, and entered the Mediterranean Sea on 28 December 1977. While operating with the United States Sixth Fleet in the Mediterranean, she participated in Chief of Naval Operation Project "Over the Horizon Testing" and, during March 1978 took part in Exercise "Dogfish." She concluded her deployment with her arrival at Norfolk in May 1978.

Between 2 July and 4 August 1978, Archerfish conducted a midshipman training cruise on 23 August 1978 and began participation in Exercise Northern Wedding, a NATO exercise that occupied her through 8 October 1978. She then returned to Norfolk for leave and upkeep followed by preparations for cold-weather drills in early 1979. Archerfish got underway for the Arctic on 14 March 1979. During her cruise there she traveled over 9,000 nautical miles (17,000 km) under the polar ice cap and surfaced through it 23 times, once at the North Pole. Archerfish arrived in Plymouth, England, on 11 May 1979 for a six-day visit and then proceeded to Zeebrugge, Belgium. She left Belgium on 21 May 1979 bound for New London, which had once again become her home port, on 5 June 1979.

In mid-July 1979, Archerfish entered the Portsmouth Naval Shipyard in Kittery, Maine, for a repairs and alterations. She got underway again on 3 October 1979 and headed to the West Indies for acoustic trials and weapons testing. She arrived at New London on 21 November 1979 and ended the year there in upkeep.

=== 1980 ===
On 23 January 1980, Archerfish got underway to take part in RANGEX 1–80, a multi-ship antisubmarine warfare exercise held in the Atlantic Ocean. She returned to New London on 10 February 1980 and remained there until proceeding to Hampton Roads, Virginia, in mid-March 1980 to enter the Newport News Shipbuilding shipyard at Newport News, Virginia, for the replacement of a sonar dome. That work was completed on 1 April 1980, and Archerfish returned to New London to prepare for another deployment.

On 23 May 1980, Archerfish left New London for the North Atlantic Ocean to conduct special operations. During the cruise, she made port calls in Norway and West Germany before returning to New London on 25 August 1980.

Archerfish returned to the West Indies in mid-October 1980 for torpedo testing off the Bahamas. She paused at Norfolk for deperming before returning to New London on 30 October 1980. She got underway on 17 November 1980 to take part in Atlantic Antisubmarine Warfare Exercise 2–81. Upon completing the exercise on 26 November 1980, she returned to New London to begin a series of inspections.

=== 1981–1986 ===
Archerfish continued operations from New London into early 1981. During 1981 and 1982, she alternated two spring deployments to the Mediterranean Sea with normal operations out of New London during the autumn and winter. In February 1983, she began a regular overhaul at the Portsmouth Naval Shipyard at Kittery, Maine. The extended repair period lasted until October 1984 at which time she resumed duty out of New London, Connecticut. Those operations included a North Atlantic deployment in 1985 and a deployment to the polar icecap in 1986, where she met up with USS Hawkbill (SSN-666) and USS Ray (SSN-653) to join in the first tri-submarine surfacing at the North Pole.

=== 1987–1998 ===
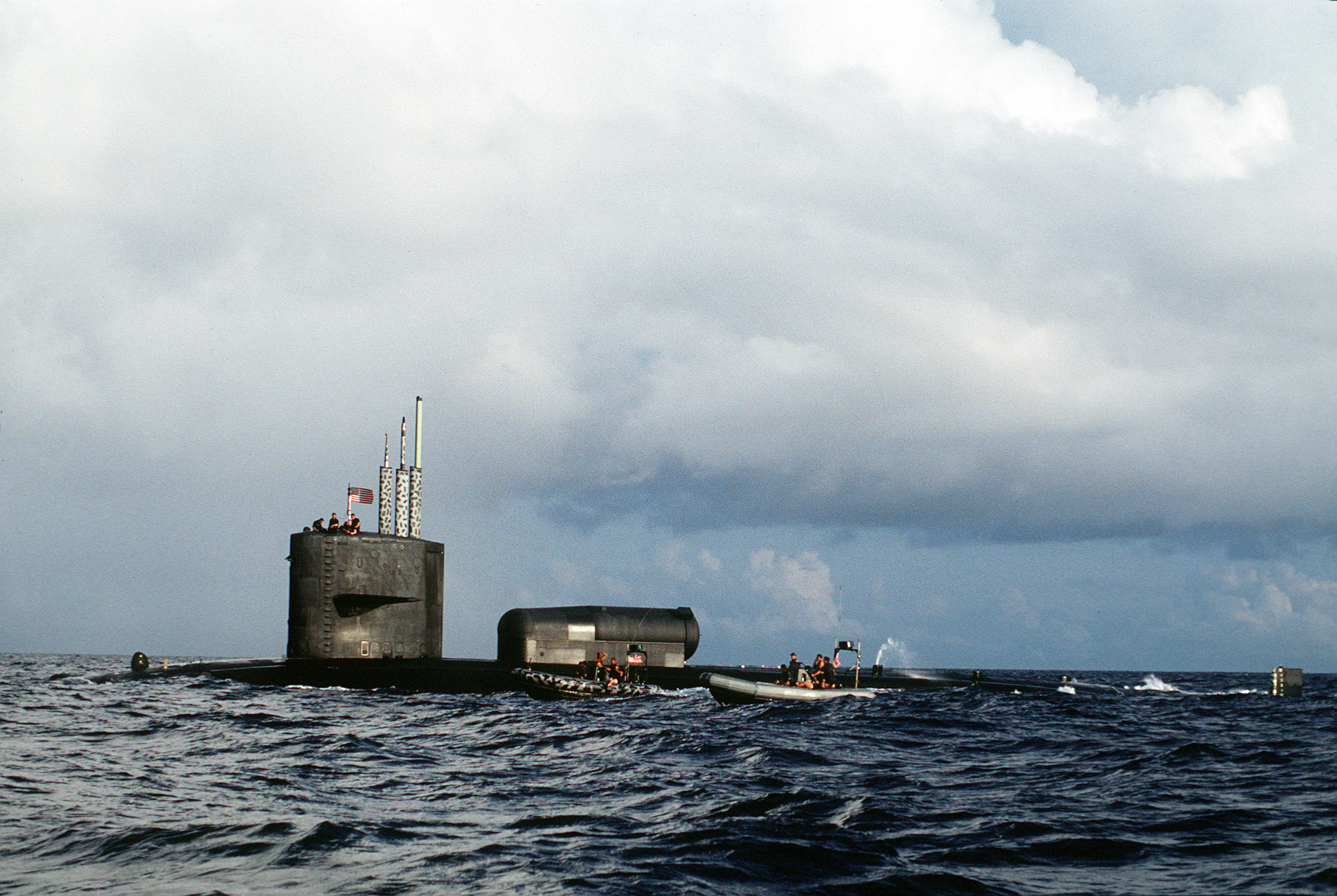
A pair of rigid-hulled inflatable boats of United States Navy SEALs Special Boat Unit 4 operate alongside USS Archerfish (SSN-678) during the joint-service exercise Ocean Venture '93 off the coast of Puerto Rico on 5 May 1993. Archerfish has a Dry Deck Shelter attached to her deck.

Archerfish continued local operations until summer 1987, when she was deployed to the Mediterranean Sea. Her next major deployment was in 1988 when she participated in under ice operations at the North Pole. In September 1988, Archerfish sailed to Puget Sound, Washington where she was drydocked and overhauled. Here she was fitted with a Dry Deck Shelter. After overhaul she did four Mediterranean Sea deployments from 1992 to 1997.

== Decommissioning and disposal ==
Archerfish was decommissioned on 31 March 1998 and struck from the Naval Vessel Register the same day. Her scrapping via the U.S. Navy's Nuclear-Powered Ship and Submarine Recycling Program at the Puget Sound Naval Shipyard in Bremerton, Washington, was completed on 6 November 1998.
