= Sturgeon-class submarine =

Class of fast attack nuclear submarine by US Navy

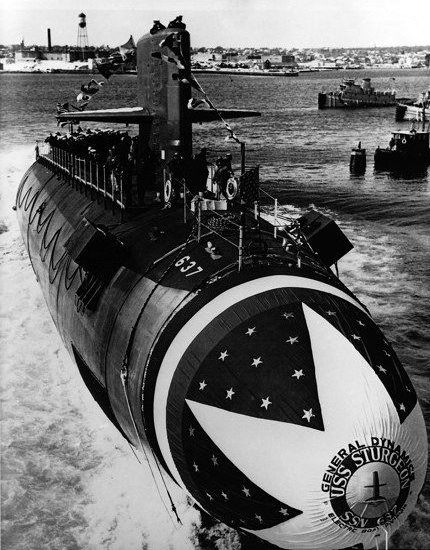
- USS Sturgeon

Class overview
- Name: Sturgeon class
- Builders: General Dynamics Electric Boat; General Dynamics Quincy; Ingalls Shipbuilding; Portsmouth Naval Shipyard; New York Shipbuilding; Newport News Shipbuilding; Mare Island Naval Shipyard
- Operators: United States Navy
- Preceded by: Thresher/Permit class
- Succeeded by: Los Angeles class
- Subclasses: Long-hull variant (9 boats)
- Built: 1963–1975
- In commission: 1967–2004
- Completed: 37 (+1 modified variant for experimental research)
- Retired: 37 (+1)

General characteristics
- Type: Nuclear-powered attack submarine
- Displacement: 3,640 long tons (3,698 t) surfaced; 4,640 long tons (4,714 t) submerged
- Length: Short hull: 292 ft 3 in (89.08 m); Long hull: 302 ft 3 in (92.13 m); Glenard P. Lipscomb: 365 ft 0 in (111.25 m); Parche after conversion: 401 ft 0 in (122.22 m)
- Beam: 31 ft 8 in (9.65 m)
- Draft: 24 ft 5 in (7.44 m)
- Propulsion: 1 × S5W pressurized water reactor; 2 × steam turbines, total 15,000 shp (11,000 kW); 1 shaft
- Speed: 15 knots (28 km/h; 17 mph) surfaced; 26 knots (48 km/h; 30 mph) submerged
- Range: Unlimited, except by food supplies
- Test depth: 1,320 ft (400 m)
- Complement: 107
- Armament: 4 × 21 inch (533 mm) amidship torpedo tubes with up to 21 reload weapons including: Mark 48 and Mk-48 ADCAP torpedoes, typically 4 Harpoon missiles or up to 8 Tomahawk missiles, and 2-4 SUBROC anti-submarine missiles; In minelaying configuration: Mark 67 Submarine Launched Mobile Mines and Mark 60 CAPTOR mines instead of torpedoes.

The Sturgeon class (known colloquially in naval circles as the 637 class) was a class of thirty-seven nuclear-powered fast attack submarines (SSN) in service with the United States Navy from the 1960s until 2004. They were the "workhorses" of the Navy's attack submarine fleet throughout much of the Cold War. The boats were phased out in the 1990s and early 21st century, as their successors, the Los Angeles, followed by the Seawolf and Virginia-class boats, entered service.

== Design ==
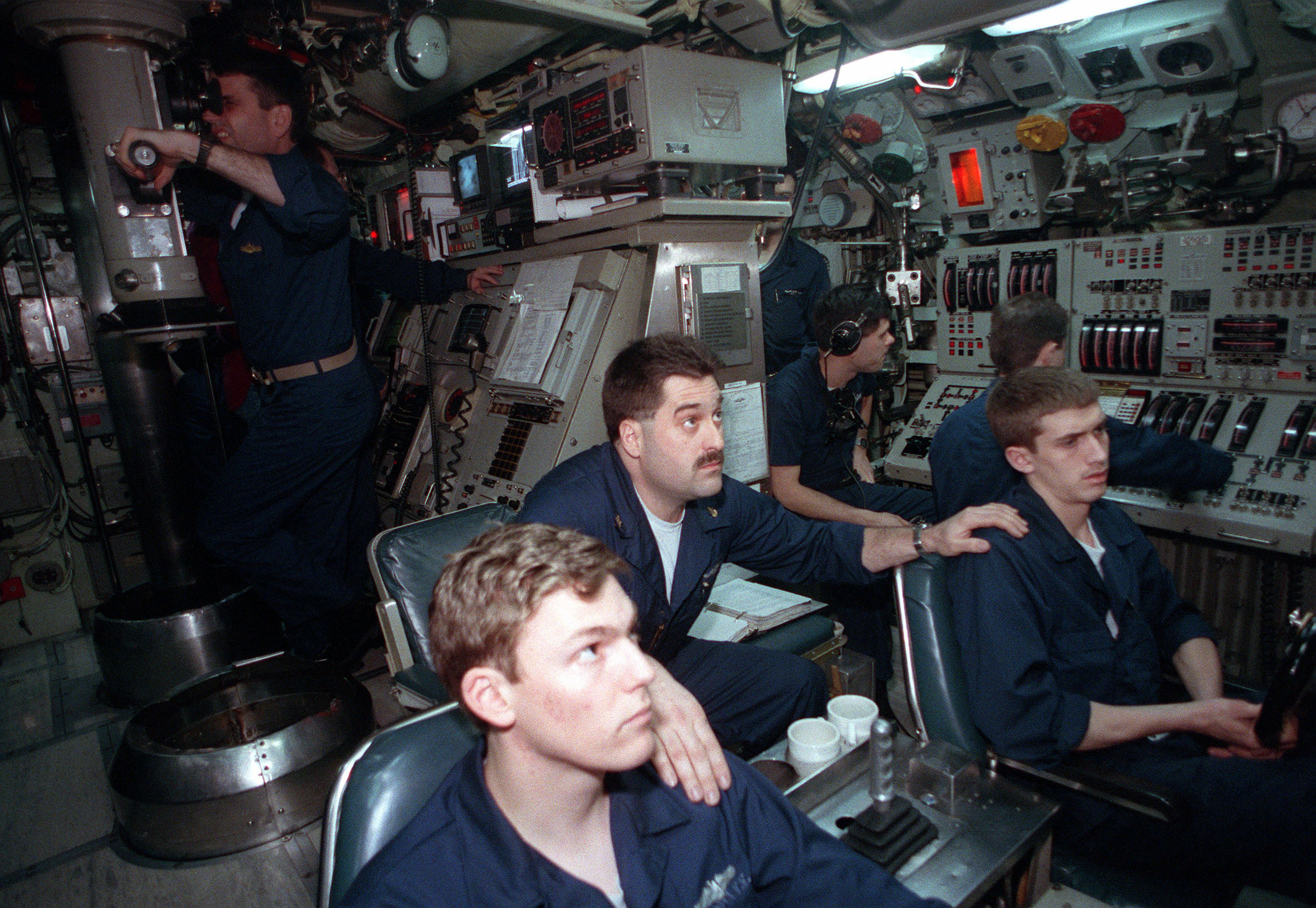
Control room

The Sturgeons were essentially lengthened and improved variants of the Thresher/Permit class that directly preceded them. The five-compartment arrangement of the Permits was retained, including the bow compartment, operations compartment, reactor compartment, auxiliary machinery room no. 2, and the engine room. The extra length was in the operations compartment, including longer torpedo racks to accommodate additional Mark 37 torpedoes, the most advanced in service at the time of the class's design in the late 1950s. The class was redesigned to SUBSAFE requirements concurrently with the construction of the first units, with seawater, main ballast, and other systems modified for improved safety. The biggest difference was the much larger sail, which permitted a second periscope and additional intelligence-gathering masts, and which reduced the risk of the submarine broaching the surface in heavy seas. The fairwater planes mounted on the sail could rotate 90 degrees, allowing the submarine to surface through thin ice. Because the S5W reactor was used (the same as in the Skipjacks and Thresher/Permits), the sail was enlarged (increasing drag), and the displacement was increased, the Sturgeons' top speed was 26 knots (48 km/h), 2 knots slower than the Thresher/Permits. The last nine Sturgeons were lengthened 10 feet (3 m) to provide more space for electronic equipment and habitability. The extra space also helped facilitate the use of dry deck shelters first deployed in 1982.

The class received mid-life upgrades in the 1980s, including the BQQ-5 sonar suite with a retractable towed array, Mk 117 torpedo fire control equipment, and other electronics upgrades.

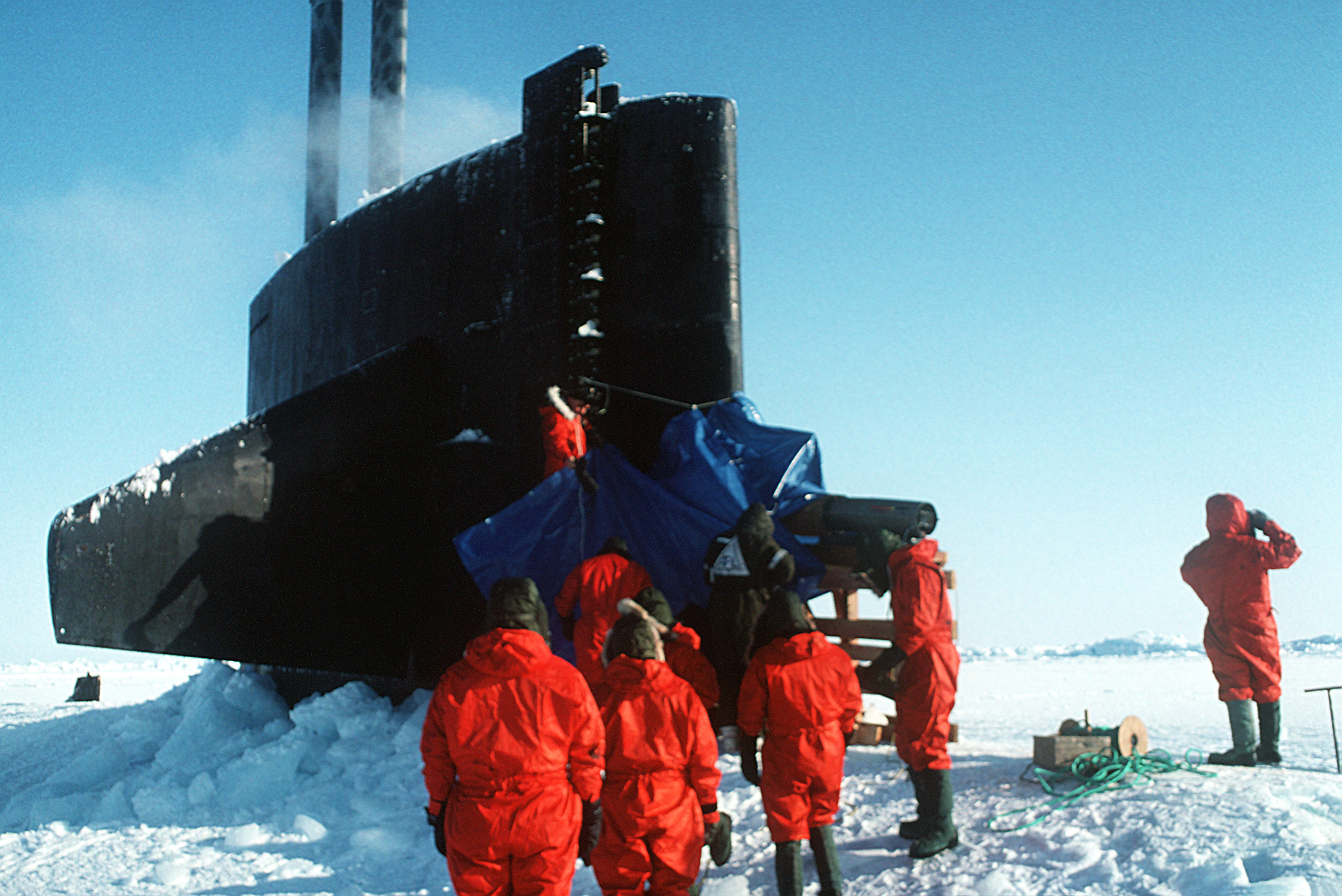
USS Pargo (SSN-650) surfaced in Arctic ice.

== Armament ==
The Sturgeon-class boats were equipped to carry the Harpoon missile, the Tomahawk cruise missile, the UUM-44 SUBROC, the Mark 67 SLMM and Mark 60 CAPTOR mines, and the MK-48 and ADCAP torpedoes. Torpedo tubes were located amidships to accommodate the bow-mounted sonar. The bow covering the sonar sphere was made from steel or glass reinforced plastic (GRP), both varieties having been produced both booted and not booted. Booted domes are covered with a half-inch layer of rubber. The GRP domes improved the bow sonar sphere performance; though for intelligence gathering missions, the towed-array sonar was normally used as it was much more sensitive.

== Noise reduction ==
Several Sturgeon boats and related submarines were modifications of the original designs to test ways to reduce noise.

- Puffer was outfitted with Raytheon Harmonic Power Conditioners which eliminated an electrical bus noise problem that was inherent in the class. This was done by harmonic conditioning of the power system. This successful feature was later outfitted on the entire class.
- Batfish and Bluefish among others were outfitted with SHT (Special Hull Treatment) during a non-refueling overhaul, which reduced noise and the submarine sonar profile.
- Glenard P. Lipscomb, a one-ship class, was completed using a turbo-electric system for main propulsion rather than a reduction gear drive from the steam turbines. The massive motor and associated generators required her to be lengthened to 365 ft 0 in (111.25 m). The Lipscomb's trial of turbo-electric propulsion was not considered successful due to lower speed - top speed was 23 knots (43 km/h), 5 knots slower than the Thresher/Permits - and a lack of reliability, and she was decommissioned in 1989.
- Narwhal, the quietest submarine of her era, had a similar but distinct design to the Sturgeon-class submarines. The Narwhal (SCB 245) and the Sturgeon class (SCB 188A) were developed simultaneously. Forward the Narwhal resembled the Sturgeon-class submarines, but with a relocated diesel generator and slightly greater beam. Aft she had the natural circulation S5G reactor and a direct-drive turbine, along with several other quieting features. Unlike the Sturgeon class, the Narwhal did not fully comply with SUBSAFE regulations due to her unique main seawater system.

== Variants ==
Beginning with Archerfish, units of this class had a 10-foot (3.0 m) longer hull, giving them more living and working space than previous submarines. Parche received an additional 100-foot (30 m) hull extension containing cable tapping equipment that brought her total length to 401 feet (122 m). A number of the long hull Sturgeon-class SSNs, including Parche, L. Mendel Rivers, and Richard B. Russell were involved in top-secret reconnaissance missions, including cable tap operations in the Barents and Okhotsk seas. Parche received nine Presidential Unit Citations for successful missions.

A total of seven boats were modified to carry the SEAL Dry Deck Shelter (DDS). The DDS is a submersible launch hangar with a lockout chamber attached to the ship's midships weapons shipping hatch, facilitating the use of SEAL Delivery Vehicles. DDS-equipped boats were tasked with the covert insertion of special forces.

== Boats in class ==
From Register of Ships of the US Navy, 1775-1990.

=== Short hull ===
- Sturgeon (SSN-637)
- Whale (SSN-638)
- Tautog (SSN-639)
- Grayling (SSN-646)
- Pogy (SSN-647)
- Aspro (SSN-648)
- Sunfish (SSN-649)
- Pargo (SSN-650)
- Queenfish (SSN-651)
- Puffer (SSN-652)
- Ray (SSN-653)
- Sand Lance (SSN-660)
- Lapon (SSN-661)
- Gurnard (SSN-662)
- Hammerhead (SSN-663)
- Sea Devil (SSN-664)
- Guitarro (SSN-665)
- Hawkbill (SSN-666)
- Bergall (SSN-667)
- Spadefish (SSN-668)
- Seahorse (SSN-669)
- Finback (SSN-670)
- Pintado (SSN-672)
- Flying Fish (SSN-673)
- Trepang (SSN-674)
- Bluefish (SSN-675)
- Billfish (SSN-676)
- Drum (SSN-677)

=== Long hull ===
- Archerfish (SSN-678) (DDS)
- Silversides (SSN-679) (DDS)
- William H. Bates (SSN-680) (ex-Redfish) (DDS)
- Batfish (SSN-681) (DDS)
- Tunny (SSN-682) (DDS)
- Parche (SSN-683) (R&D)
- Cavalla (SSN-684) (DDS)
- L. Mendel Rivers (SSN-686) (DDS)
- Richard B. Russell (SSN-687)

=== Derivatives ===
One other Navy vessel was based on the Sturgeon hull, but was modified for experimental reasons:

- Glenard P. Lipscomb (SSN-685)

== See also ==
- List of submarines of the United States Navy
- List of submarine classes of the United States Navy
