= USS Trepang (SSN-674) =

Submarine of the United States

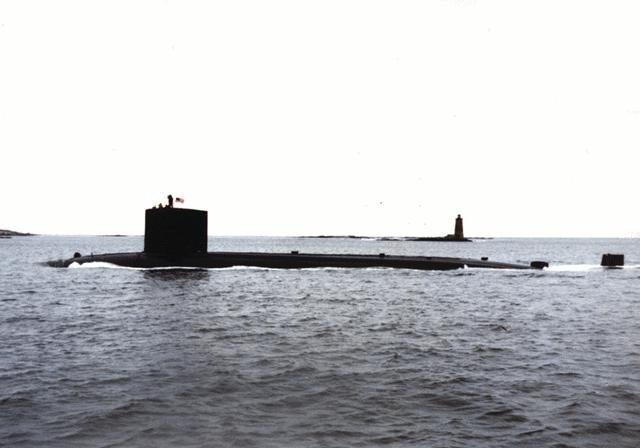
- USS Trepang (SSN-674) entering Portsmouth Naval Shipyard, Kittery, Maine.

History

United States
- Name: USS Trepang (SSN-674)
- Namesake: The trepang, Holothuroidea, a marine animal also called a "sea slug" or "sea cucumber"
- Ordered: 15 July 1966
- Builder: General Dynamics Electric Boat, Groton, Connecticut
- Laid down: 28 October 1967
- Launched: 27 September 1969
- Sponsored by: Melvin R. Laird
- Commissioned: 14 August 1970
- Decommissioned: 1 June 1999
- Stricken: 1 June 1999
- Fate: Scrapping via Ship and Submarine Recycling Program completed 7 April 2000
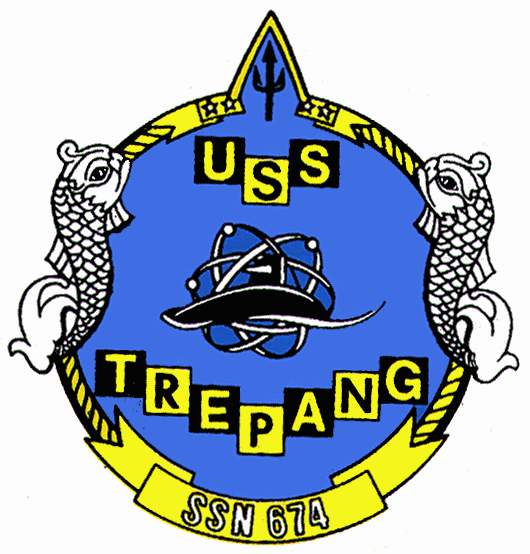
- Notes

General characteristics
- Class & type: Sturgeon-class attack submarine
- Displacement: 3,978 long tons (4,042 t) light; 4,270 long tons (4,339 t) full; 292 long tons (297 t) dead
- Length: 292 ft 3 in (89.08 m)
- Beam: 31 ft 8 in (9.65 m)
- Draft: 28 ft 8 in (8.74 m)
- Installed power: 15,000 shaft horsepower (11.2 megawatts)
- Propulsion: One S5W nuclear reactor, two steam turbines, one screw
- Speed: 15 knots (28 km/h; 17 mph) surfaced; 25 knots (46 km/h; 29 mph) submerged
- Test depth: 1,300 feet (400 meters)
- Complement: 109 (14 officers, 95 enlisted men)
- Armament: 4 × 21-inch (533 mm) torpedo tubes

USS Trepang (SSN-674), a Sturgeon-class attack submarine, was the second ship of the United States Navy to be named for the trepang, Holothuroidea, a marine animal with a long, tough, muscular body.

== Construction and commissioning ==
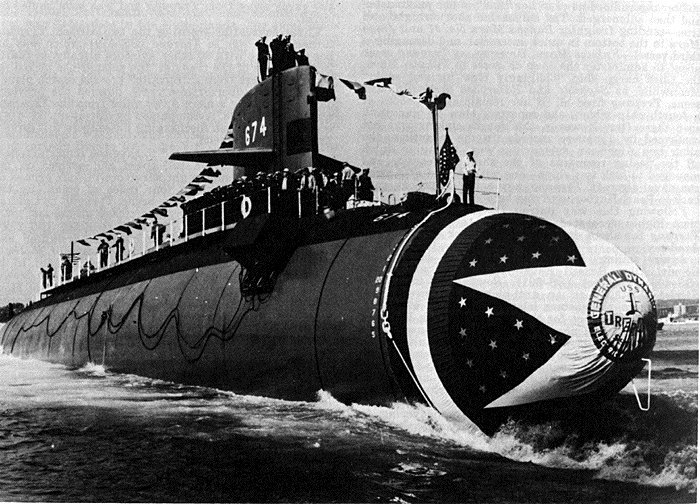
Trepang being launched at Groton, Connecticut, on 27 September 1969.

The contract to build Trepang was awarded to the Electric Boat Division of General Dynamics Corporation in Groton, Connecticut, on 15 July 1966 and her keel was laid down there on 28 October 1967. She was launched on 27 September 1969, sponsored by Mrs. Melvin R. Laird, the wife of United States Secretary of Defense Melvin R. Laird, and commissioned on 14 August 1970.

== Service history ==
=== 1970-1971 ===
Following local operations out of her home port, New London, Connecticut, Trepang proceeded to the Arctic early in 1971. From 22 February to 22 March 1971, she operated beneath the polar ice cap, conducting extensive tests to provide data for her weapons systems as well as carrying out scientific experiments concerning the movement, composition, and geological history of the ice cap itself.

After returning to New London via Faslane, Scotland, Trepang was soon deployed to the warmer climes of the Caribbean Sea, departing from New London on 22 April 1971 and subsequently making port at Frederiksted on St. Croix in the United States Virgin Islands for weapons systems acceptance and evaluation trials. Back in New England waters for local operations, Trepang again headed south for further tests. In November 1971, she deployed to conduct independent operations in the North Atlantic Ocean.

=== 1972 ===
Following her return to New London on 5 February 1972, Trepang underwent a routine post-deployment standdown and upkeep, as well as attack submarine training and equipment grooming in local operating areas. She conducted a second extended deployment into the North Atlantic from 24 July to 25 September 1972, returning to New London via Halifax, Nova Scotia, Canada. For the remainder of 1972, she operated off the United States East Coast between New London and Fort Lauderdale, Florida.

=== 1973 ===
An interim four-week drydocking period at the Portsmouth Naval Shipyard at Kittery, Maine, preceded Trepang's 1973 operations before she headed south for weapons tests off the Florida coast. Completing a four-week upkeep period on 22 April 1973, she completed a Nuclear Technical Proficiency Inspection before returning to New London, where she completed an Operational Reactor Safeguard Examination on 4 May 1973.

On 8 June 1973, Trepang departed New London for a six-month deployment with the United States Sixth Fleet in the Mediterranean Sea. She participated in several special operations with the Sixth Fleet during the increased tension brought on by the Yom Kippur War in the Middle East in October 1973. She returned to New London at the end of November 1973 for upkeep and the routine post-deployment standdown leave period.

=== 1974 ===
Trepang got underway on 15 February 1974 for a special operation which lasted through 9 April 1974. She then spent three days at Holy Loch, Scotland, before departing for New London. She continued local operations and training off the U.S. East Coast through her change of home port on 1 October 1974, when Portsmouth, New Hampshire, became her new base. She spent the remainder of 1974 in drydock in annual overhaul.

=== 1975 ===
While in overhaul, Trepang was assigned to Submarine Squadron 10 during March 1975. She spent April to August 1975 completing the overhaul and carrying out crew training and recertification. Following sea trials in late October 1975, Trepang returned to New London, which once again became her home port, on 7 November for an intensive post-overhaul upkeep alongside submarine tender USS Fulton (AS-11).

Departing New London on 1 December 1975, Trepang conducted post-overhaul weapons systems acceptance testing at Roosevelt Roads Naval Station in Puerto Rico and five days of acoustic trials off Frederiksted at St. Croix in the U.S. Virgin Islands before departing St. Croix on 17 December 1975 and returning to New London on 22 December.

=== 1976 ===
Trepang spent the early part of 1976 preparing for an extended cruise. She deployed to the Mediterranean Sea from June to November 1976, operating with the Sixth Fleet. She returned to New London upon conclusion of the deployment, and the routine post-deployment standdown lasted into 1977.

=== 1977 ===
In mid-January 1977, Trepang participated in Exercise "CARIBEX 77" in the Caribbean. She devoted the spring of 1977 to individual ship exercises which included a Nuclear Technical Proficiency Inspection, a Mk-48 Torpedo Proficiency Inspection, and an Operational Readiness Inspection, all of which she completed successfully. An extensive refit period, which included drydocking, took place in May and early June 1977. Midshipman orientation cruises followed and, in September, Trepang conducted pre-deployment work-up and certification. She then engaged in a training mission in the Atlantic Ocean from mid-October to mid-December 1977 before returning to New London and beginning a routine post-deployment standdown.

=== 1978 ===
After the standdown ended during January 1978, Trepang devoted the remainder of January, February, and March to attack submarine training and participation in the North Atlantic Treaty Organization (NATO) Exercise "Safepass." She spent the summer of 1978 working up for a scheduled Mediterranean deployment. The deployment was subsequently cancelled to permit her to participate in a special Chief of Naval Operations project. She spent the remaining months of 1978 in the evaluation of equipment associated with that project, with periods at sea alternating with periods in port devoted to equipment maintenance.

In October 1978, the FBI arrested three men—two in St. Louis, one in New York—on charges of conspiring to steal the USS Trepang, based in New London, Ct. The FBI discovered the plot when Edward J. Mendenhall and James W. Cosgrove, two of the accused conspirators, contacted an undercover agent seeking funds for training and supplies. After stealing the submarine, the two intended to kill the crew, put out to sea, and rendezvous with an unidentified buyer.

She departed Groton on 27 November 1978 to conclude 1978 at sea conducting activities related to the special project.

=== 1979-1988 ===
In April 1985, Trepang deployed to the Arctic for ICEX-85. In addition, Trepang was deployed to assist U.S. Navy and civilian researchers for the Arctic Research and Environmental Acoustic (AREA) program. During this deployment, the ship surfaced at the North Pole on May 3, 1985. After four months in the Arctic, the Trepang sailed to HMNB Portsmouth before returning to its homeport, Naval Submarine Base New London, in Groton, Connecticut. In 1987, Trepang completed a Mediterranean deployment. During this deployment, Trepang participated in exercises with the 6th Fleet. At this time, Trepang visited Toulon Arsenal in Toulon, France, and La Maddalena, Sardinia, Italy.

=== 1988-1991 ===
In 1988, Trepang visited Bermuda, earned the Battle "E" and visited Scotland following a Northern Atlantic deployment. After a change of command in November 1988, Trepang deployed on a two-month unsupported ASW mission to the North Atlantic for which she was awarded a Meritorious Unit Commendation. After completion of Pre-Overhaul Testing (POT), in March 1989 Trepang entered her first regular refueling overhaul at Portsmouth Naval Shipyard in Kittery, ME. During the refueling overhaul Trepang completed the test program on-schedule and under budget. Trepang also maintained an effective "Host City" program with the city of Dover, NH. In recognition of the success of this and other community/education related programs she was awarded the 1990-1991 New Hampshire State Department of Education Community/School Partnership Award. Additionally Trepang was awarded the 1990 Silver Anchor Award for excellence in retention programs. In September 1991, after successful completion of her post overhaul sea trials she completed her refueling overhaul. Following a change of command in October 1991, Trepang then moved to her new home port of Charleston, South Carolina. During her voyage from Kittery, ME to Charleston, SC late in 1991 she transited beneath under the 1991 "Perfect Storm".

=== 1991-1998 ===
During the remainder of her career, Trepang conducted many "fast-attack submarine" drill missions as well as a Mediterranean cruise interrupted by a stay of many weeks in La Maddalena, Italy, and Haifa, Israel. During her Mediterranean deployment, she participated in NATO operations Operation Sharp Guard off Bosnia-Herzegovina, became the first American submarine in history to perform peacetime operations with a German submarine—namely U-29 (S178), conducted a secret mission tailing a drug-smuggling ship, and trained with SEAL Team 6.

During these years, one of Trepang's sister ships, USS Bluefish (SSN-675) was considered her "sister submarine," and the two often docked near one another.

In 1995, Trepang participated in joint exercises with the Chilean Navy.

Trepang conducted her final six-month deployment to the Mediterranean between June and December 1997. In late 1998, she circumnavigated the world in order to use up as much nuclear fuel as possible prior to decommissioning. She was awarded during this time the Joint Meritorious Unit Award (reasons unknown).

== Decommissioning and disposal ==
Trepang was decommissioned on 1 June 1999 at Bremerton, Washington, and stricken from the Naval Vessel Register the same day. Her scrapping via the Nuclear-Powered Ship and Submarine Recycling Program at Puget Sound Naval Shipyard in Bremerton was completed on 7 April 2000. Components of 'Trepang', including mess tables, crew bunks, and engineering, were used in the "Fast Attacks and Boomers: Submarines in the Cold War" exhibit at the Smithsonian Museum of American History from 2000 to 2003.
