= USS Puffer (SSN-652) =

Submarine of the United States

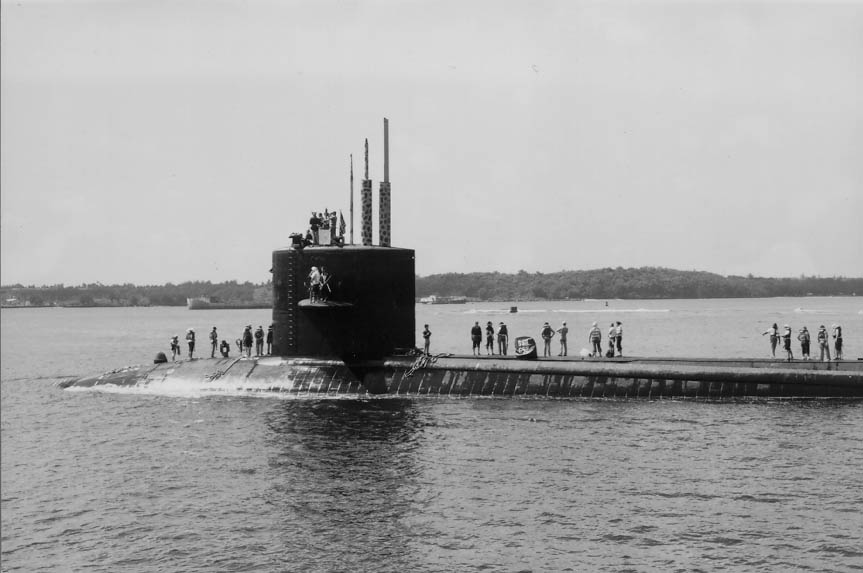
- USS Puffer (SSN-652) on her way to Guam in 1994.

History

United States
- Name: USS Puffer (SSN-652)
- Namesake: The pufferfish
- Ordered: 26 March 1963
- Builder: Ingalls Shipbuilding, Pascagoula, Mississippi
- Laid down: 8 February 1965
- Launched: 30 March 1968
- Sponsored by: Mrs. John B. Colwell
- Commissioned: 9 August 1969
- Decommissioned: 12 July 1996
- Stricken: 12 July 1996
- Motto: Pride in Perfection
- Fate: Scrapping via Ship and Submarine Recycling Program completed 28 March 1997

General characteristics
- Class & type: Sturgeon-class attack submarine
- Displacement: 3,978 long tons (4,042 t) light; 4,272 long tons (4,341 t) full; 294 long tons (299 t) dead
- Length: 292 ft (89 m)
- Beam: 32 ft (9.8 m)
- Draft: 29 ft (8.8 m)
- Installed power: 15,000 shaft horsepower (11.2 megawatts)
- Propulsion: One S5W nuclear reactor, two steam turbines, one screw
- Speed: Over 20 knots (37 km/h; 23 mph)
- Test depth: 1,300 feet (400 meters)
- Complement: 109 (14 officers, 95 enlisted men
- Armament: 4 × 21-inch (533 mm) torpedo tubes; Mark 48 torpedoes; Tomahawk cruise missiles; UGM-84A/C Harpoon missiles; Mark 60 CAPTOR mines; Mark 61 mines; Mark 67 Submarine Launched Mobile Mines

USS Puffer (SSN-652), a Sturgeon-class nuclear attack submarine, was the second ship of the United States Navy to be named for the pufferfish, a saltwater fish with toxic spines that can inflate its body with water or air and is one of the most poisonous vertebrates in the world.

== Construction and commissioning ==
The contract to build Puffer was awarded to Ingalls Shipbuilding in Pascagoula, Mississippi, on 26 March 1963, and her keel was laid down there on 8 February 1965. She was launched on 30 March 1968, sponsored by Mrs. John B. Colwell, and commissioned on 9 August 1969.

== Service history ==
Like all ships of her class in the Silent Service, USS Puffer conducted many operations that were critical to the needs of the nation and the U.S. Navy during the Cold War.

== 1970s ==
USS Puffer operated in the Pacific Ocean during the 1970s, earning two Navy Unit Commendations and at least one Presidential Unit Citation, among other awards. At least one of her commanding officers during the 1970s earned a Legion of Merit for his role in leading Puffer on a highly successful mission.

On 22 May 1978 a valve was mistakenly opened releasing up to 500 US gallons (1,900 L; 420 imp gal) of radioactive water into Puget Sound, during an overhaul in drydock at Bremerton Naval Shipyard.

== 1980s ==
As part of Submarine Squadron One, from May to October 1980 USS Puffer, under the command of Commander Howard W. Habermeyer Jr., USN, conducted her fifth Westpac/Indian Ocean Cruise, visiting the ports of Hong Kong, Subic Bay in the Philippine Islands, Guam, and Diego Garcia. On 18 July 1980 USS Puffer docked at HMAS Stirling, Rockingham, Western Australia for an R&R visit, departing on 25 July 1980. After this deployment USS Puffer received her third Navy Unit Commendation.

After returning to Pearl Harbor from her 1980 Westpac cruise, USS Puffer conducted local operations from November 1980 to May 1981, when the submarine went into a Selected Restricted Availability (SRA) which was completed in August 1981. During 1981 USS Puffer was awarded Submarine Squadron One's Battle 'E', Engineering 'E', and Supply 'E'. From September to late October 1981 USS Puffer conducted workups for her upcoming deployment.

USS Puffer conducted her sixth Westpac/Indian Ocean Cruise from November 1981 to 14 May 1982. Still under the command of Commander Habermeyer, USS Puffer again visited ports like Subic Bay in the Philippine Islands, and Yokosuka, Japan. Again USS Puffer docked at HMAS Stirling, Rockingham, Western Australia for an R&R visit from 10 to 17 February 1982. After this deployment USS Puffer received her fourth Navy Unit Commendation, as well as her second Submarine Squadron One Battle 'E'.

== 1989 ==
Prior to the filming of The Hunt for Red October, actor Sean Connery was on board preparing for his role as Captain Marko Ramius. He was given the honorary status of a Navy commander and was allowed (while the ship's captain was next to him) to give orders while the ship was underway. (Ref. IMDb.com)

In The Hunt for Red October, the scene for the flashing light sequence was filmed at sea off the coast of San Diego using Puffer and a captain's gig from one of the submarine tenders located at the Point Loma submarine base. A mess cook who knew Morse Code was given a script. The eyepiece was removed from the Number 2 periscope and a large flashlight was used, since a modern submarine does not have (or need) the capability to transmit Morse code in the way that was shown in the film. Puffer is not listed in the film credits.

== Decommissioning and disposal ==
After more than 25 years of service, Puffer was decommissioned on 12 July 1996 and stricken from the Naval Vessel Register the same day. Her scrapping via the Nuclear-Powered Ship and Submarine Recycling Program at Puget Sound Naval Shipyard at Bremerton, Washington, began on 20 October 1996 and was completed on 28 March 1997.

Puffer's fairwater planes can be seen as part of The Fin Project, a permanent outdoor art installation on the shore of Lake Washington in Seattle, at Magnusson Park.
