= USS Sturgeon (SSN-637) =

Sturgeon class submarine

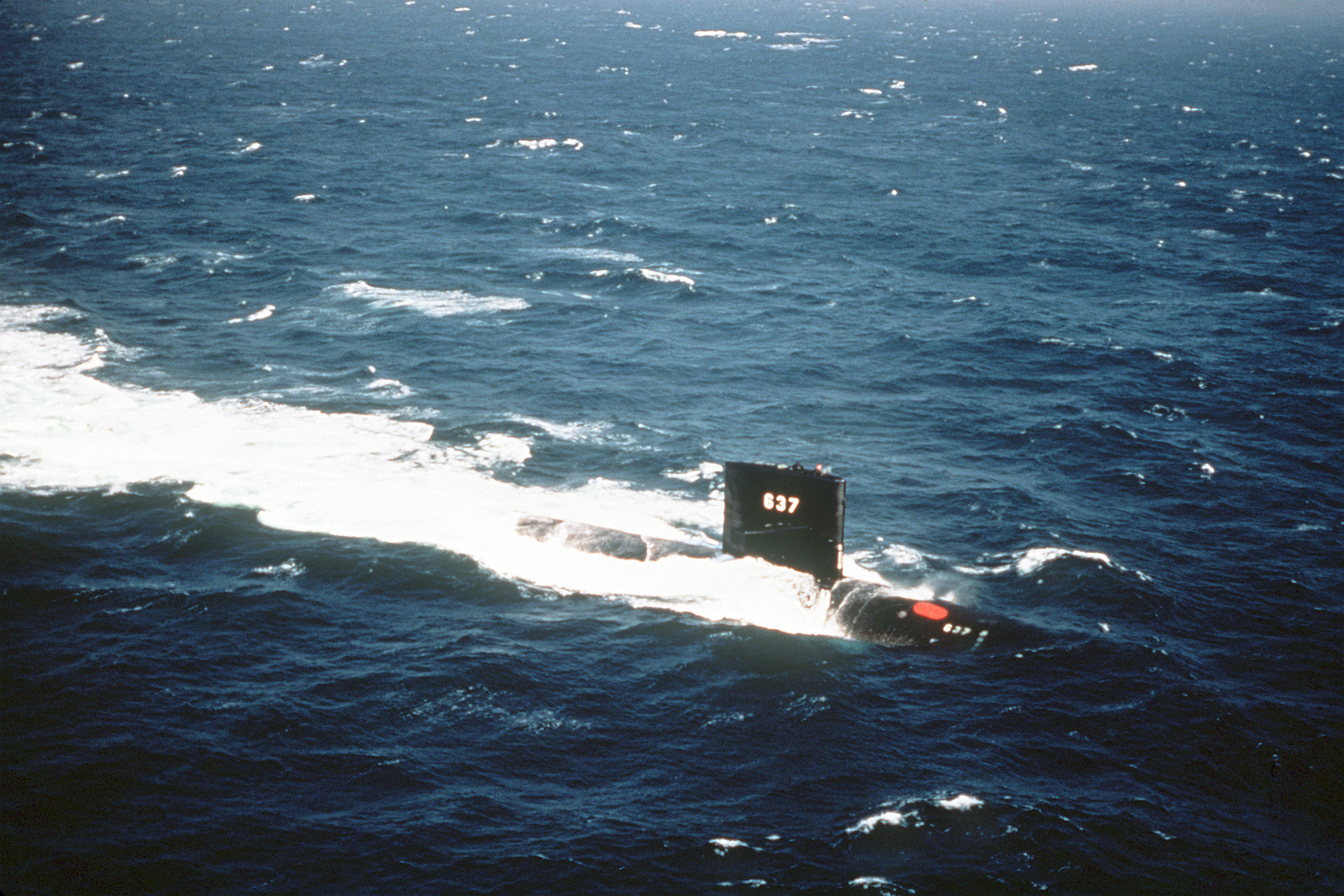
- USS Sturgeon (SSN-637)

History

United States
- Name: Sturgeon
- Namesake: The sturgeon
- Ordered: 30 November 1961
- Builder: General Dynamics Electric Boat, Groton, Connecticut
- Laid down: 10 August 1963
- Launched: 26 February 1966
- Sponsored by: Mrs. Everett Dirksen
- Commissioned: 3 March 1967
- Decommissioned: 1 August 1994
- Stricken: 1 August 1994
- Identification: Hull symbol: SSN-637; Call sign: NKTS
- Honors and awards: Meritorious Unit Commendation (1968); Meritorious Unit Commendation (1969); Navy Unit Commendation (1970)
- Fate: Scrapping via Ship and Submarine Recycling Program, 11 December 1995

General characteristics
- Class & type: Sturgeon-class attack submarine
- Displacement: 3,640 long tons (3,700 t) surfaced; 4,649 long tons (4,724 t) submerged
- Length: 292 ft 3 in (89.08 m)
- Beam: 31 ft 9 in (9.68 m)
- Draft: 28 ft 8 in (8.74 m)
- Installed power: 15,000 shp (11,185.5 kW)
- Propulsion: 1 × S5W nuclear reactor; 2 × steam turbines; 1 × shaft
- Speed: 28 kn (52 km/h; 32 mph)
- Test depth: 1,300 ft (400 m)
- Complement: 14 officers, 95 men
- Armament: 4 × 21-inch (533 mm) torpedo tubes; MK 48 torpedo; UUM-44 SUBROC; UGM-84A/C Harpoon; MK 57 deep water mines; MK 60 Deep water mine

USS Sturgeon (SSN-637) was the lead ship of her class of nuclear-powered fast attack submarines. She was the third ship of the United States Navy to be named for the sturgeon.

== Construction and commissioning ==
The contract to build Sturgeon was awarded to the Electric Boat Division, of General Dynamics Corporation, in Groton, Connecticut, on 30 November 1961, and her keel was laid down there on 10 August 1963. She was launched on 26 February 1966, sponsored by Louella Carver, the wife of United States Senator Everett Dirksen, of Illinois, and commissioned on 3 March 1967.

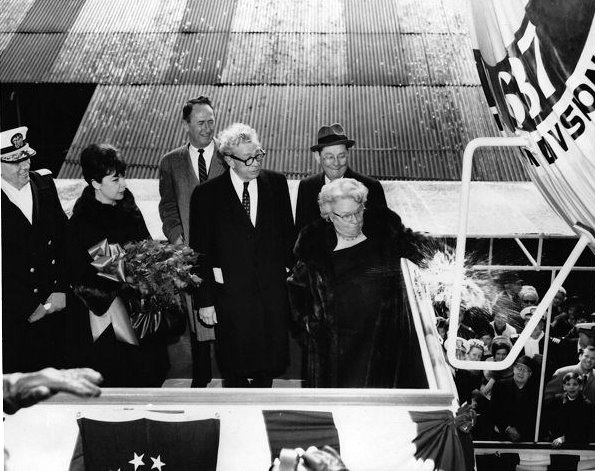
The USS Sturgeon was launched on 26 February 1966, sponsored by Mrs. Everett Dirkson, the wife of US Senator Everett Dirksen of Illinois.

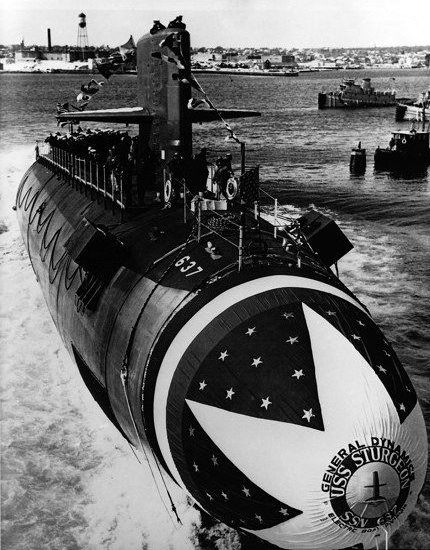

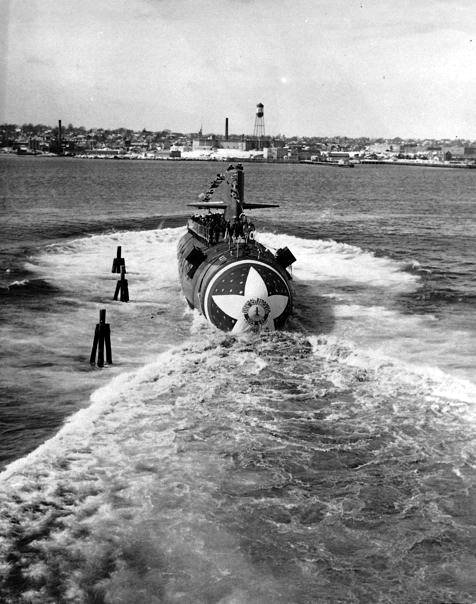

== Service history ==
=== 1968–1970 ===
Sturgeon spent a month conducting refresher training and then began her shakedown cruise on 3 April 1967, down the United States East Coast and to Puerto Rico. She returned to Groton, for repairs, alterations, maintenance, and training until 18 September 1967, when she departed on extended operations. She returned to port on 2 October 1967, and was transferred to Submarine Development Group 2. On 22 January 1968, she began a five-week antisubmarine warfare (ASW) exercise to evaluate the relative effectiveness of Sturgeon-class and Permit-class attack submarines.

Sturgeon began a three-month post-shakedown period of alterations and repairs on 3 March 1968. When the shipyard work was completed in June 1968, she participated in the search for the missing attack submarine Scorpion in the vicinity of the Azores. She spent July and August 1968, preparing for overseas deployment, then was deployed from September to early November 1968. She participated in tests and evaluation of a new sonar detection device from December 1968 to February 1969. She visited the United States Naval Academy at Annapolis, Maryland, in March 1969, and then held an intensive training period for her crew before deploying from May to July 1969. In April 1969, she was awarded a Meritorious Unit Commendation for outstanding service during a period in 1968.

Sturgeon participated in fleet submarine exercises in August and September 1969, and in a project for the Chief of Naval Operations from 29 September to 31 October 1969. She was awarded a second Meritorious Unit Commendation, in December 1969, for her service during a period earlier in 1969. After training and preparation for another period at sea, she deployed from 29 January to 8 April 1970. In May and June 1970, she aided in evaluating aircraft antisubmarine warfare tactics and equipment. She spent the period from 1 July to 26 July 1970, in a submarine exercise, and from 15 August to 1 September 1970, in sound trials. On 5 October 1970, she began an overhaul at Groton, which lasted until 5 October 1971. While in the shipyard in December 1970, Sturgeon was awarded the Navy Unit Commendation for exceptionally meritorious service during a period earlier that year.

=== 1971–1994 ===
When Sturgeon completed her overhaul in October 1971, she was transferred to Submarine Squadron 10, based at New London, Connecticut. She held refresher training and completed a shakedown cruise from 6 October to 15 December 1971. The period from 16 December 1971 through 16 January 1972, was a leave and upkeep period. She then participated in two ASW exercises before returning to Groton, for repairs and alterations, from 6 March to 27 May 1972. She conducted sea trials until 15 July 1972, at which time she began a test on sonar systems which lasted until mid-December 1972.

Sturgeon spent the period from 1 January to 2 April 1973, conducting local operations in the area around Narragansett Bay. On 3 April 1973, she departed for the Fleet Weapons Range in the Caribbean. On 21 May 1973, she ran aground near St. Croix, in the United States Virgin Islands, while making 10 kn (19 km/h; 12 mph). She sustained damage to her bow and was forced to return to Groton, on 4 June 1973, to repair the damage.

Sturgeon returned to sea for local operations from 17 July to 1 October 1973, when she entered the Portsmouth Naval Shipyard, at Kittery, Maine, to effect bow repairs. She remained in the shipyard until 22 April 1974. After sea trials, she returned to her home port, New London, for a ten-day upkeep period. She operated from New London, until 13 August 1974, when she departed for Norfolk, Virginia, to join other fleet units participating in Atlantic Readiness Exercise 1-75. She then returned to New London, to hold local training exercises in preparation for an overseas movement.

Sturgeon stood out to sea on 29 November 1974, en route to the Mediterranean, and a scheduled six-month deployment there with the United States Sixth Fleet. She arrived in the Mediterranean, on 9 December 1974.

Sturgeon performed ICEX '89 in the late winter and early spring of 1989, surfacing through the ice in the Arctic Circle.

Sturgeon was undergoing a refit in Charleston Naval Shipyard when Hurricane Hugo struck Charleston, South Carolina, on 21 September 1989, and was unable to leave the port during the storm.

== Decommissioning and disposal ==
Sturgeon was decommissioned on 1 August 1994, and stricken from the Naval Vessel Register the same day. Her scrapping via the Nuclear-Powered Ship and Submarine Recycling Program at Puget Sound Naval Shipyard, at Bremerton, Washington, was completed on 11 December 1995. Most of her parts were disposed of or recycled, the sail was brought to the U.S. Naval Undersea Museum in August 1995 for permanent installation.

== Commemoration ==
On 15 September 1995, at the Naval Undersea Museum, in Keyport, Washington, a ceremony commemorated the transfer of Sturgeon's sail from Puget Sound Naval Shipyard. The sail is now located in the museum's parking lot. The control center is now on display at the Submarine Force Library and Museum in Groton, Connecticut.

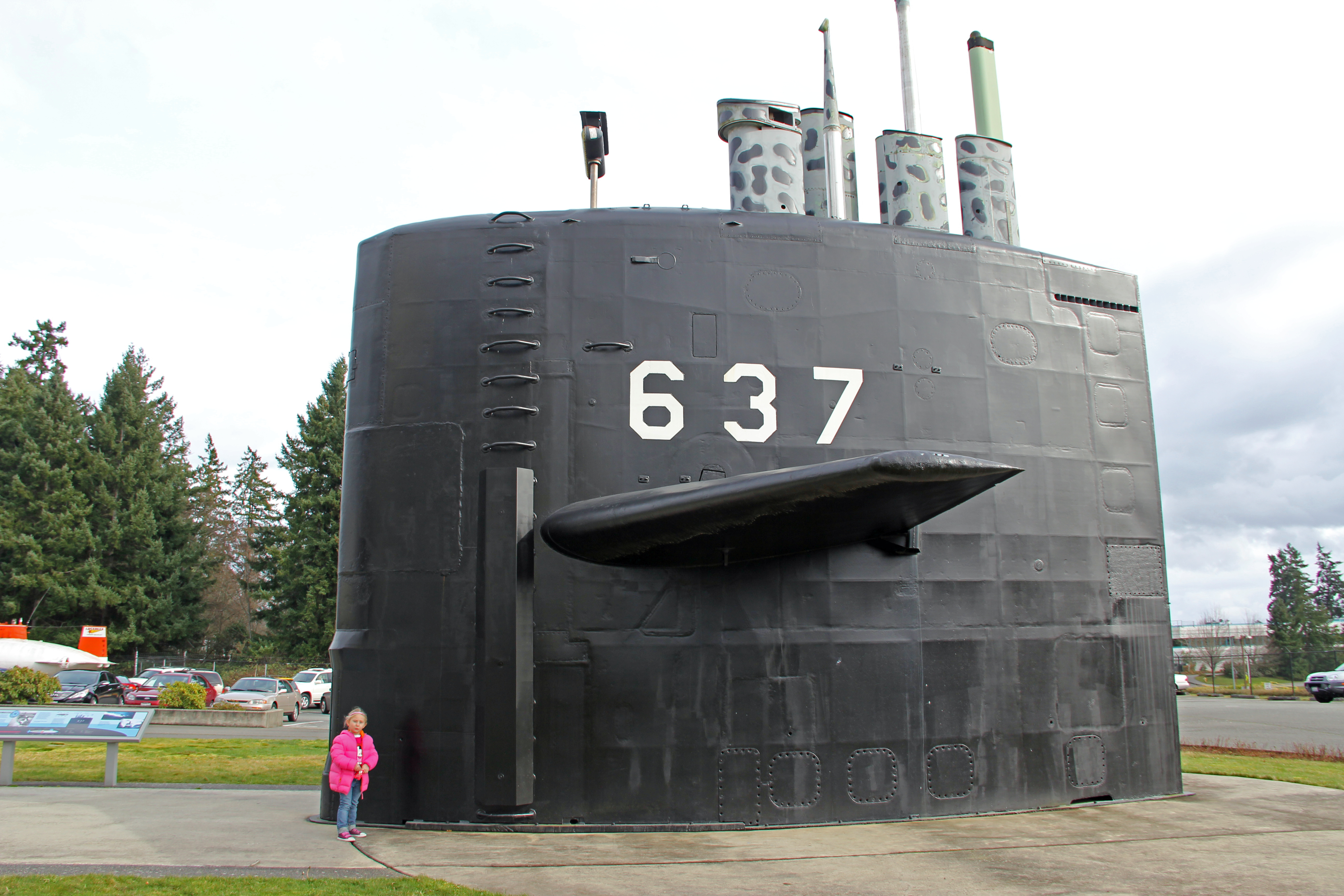
Sail outside the Naval Undersea Museum

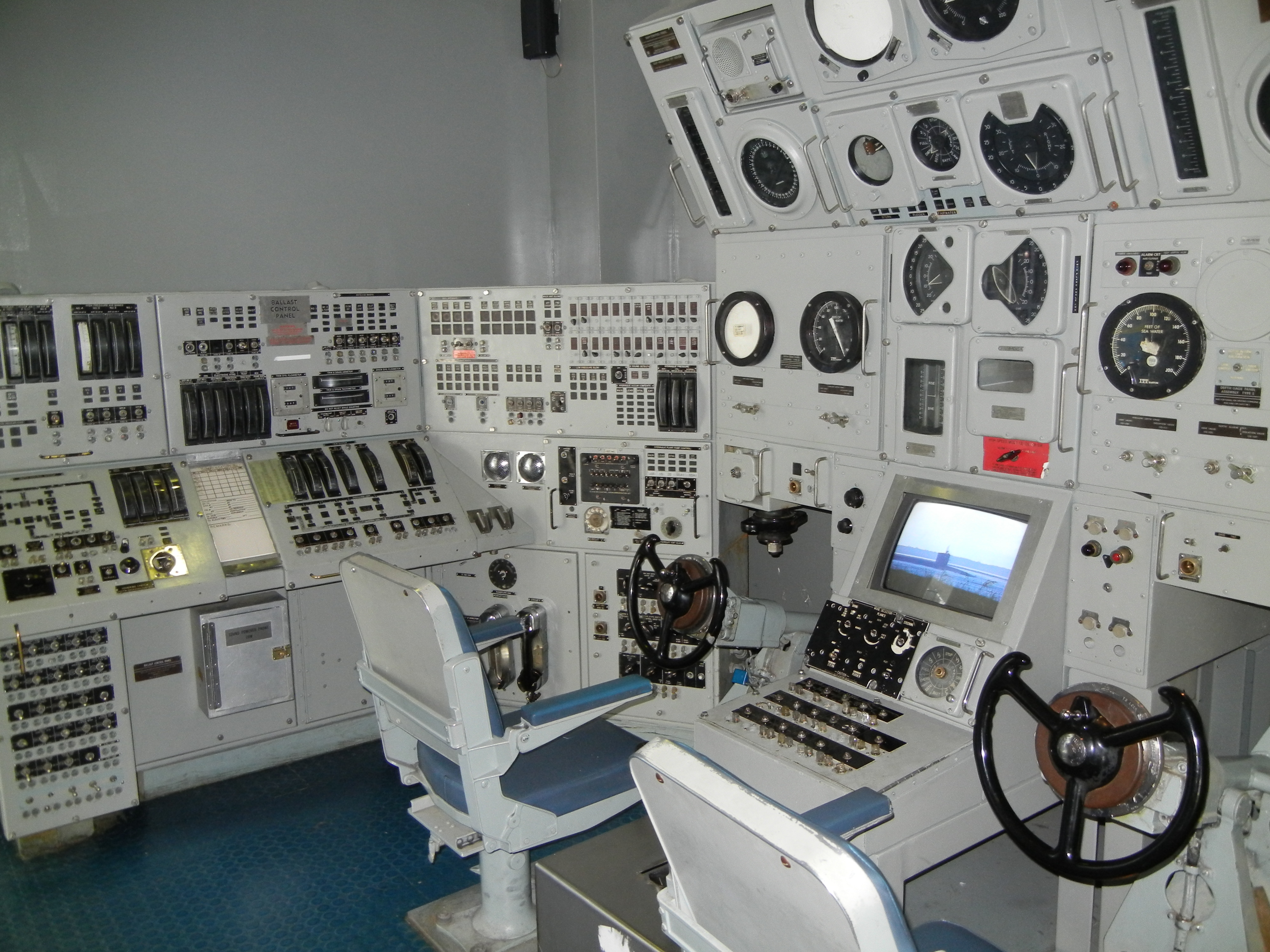
Ship Control Station at the Submarine Force Library and Museum

== Bibliography ==
- "Sturgeon II (SS(N)-637)". Naval History and Heritage Command. 24 May 2018.
- "Sturgeon (SSN-637)". NavSource.
- "Sturgeon Sail" (PDF). Archived from the original (PDF) on 14 August 2015.
