= USS Bluefish (SSN-675) =

Submarine of the United States

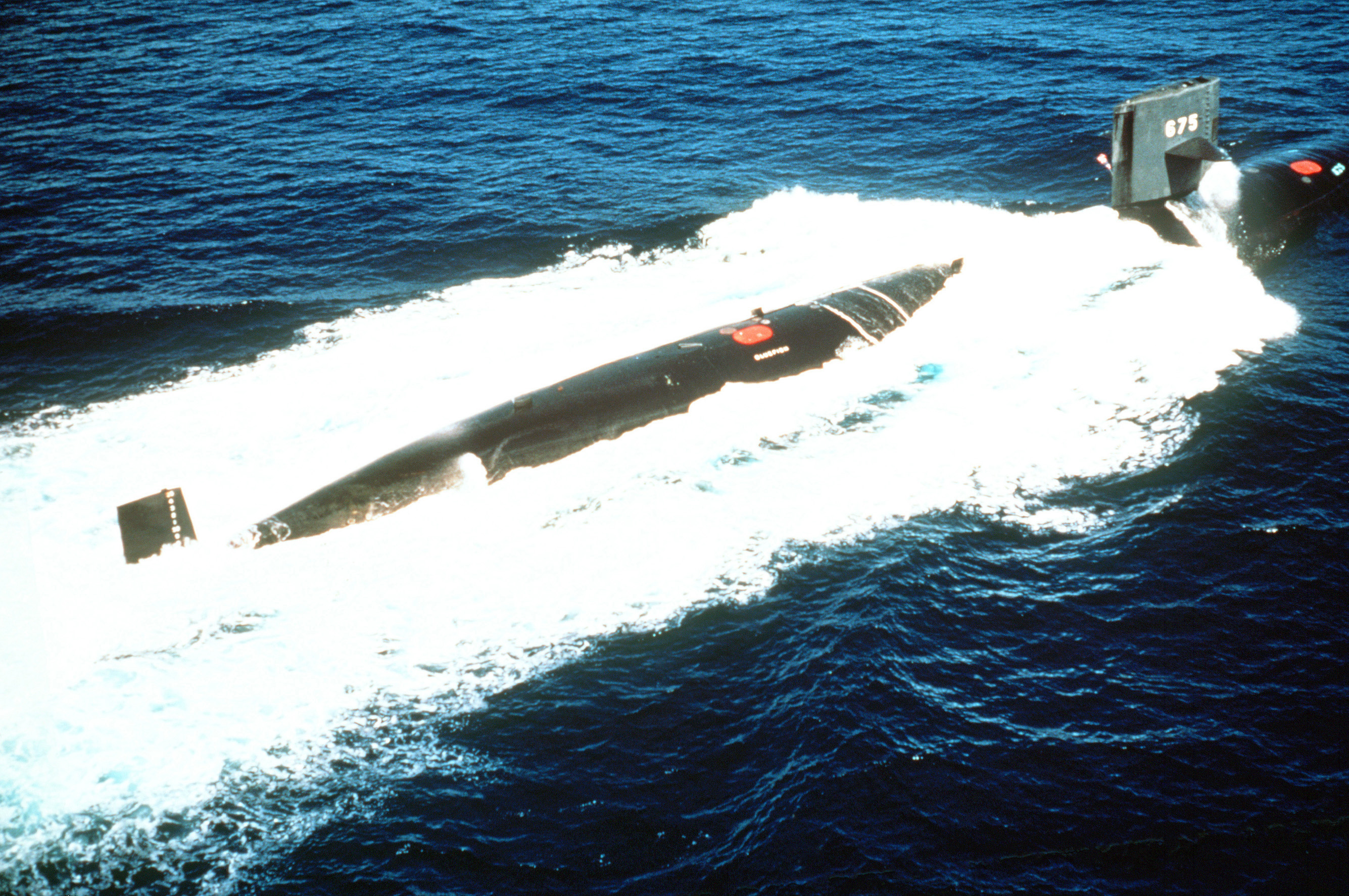
- USS Bluefish (SSN-675) off Puerto Rico on 1 February 1991.

History

United States
- Name: USS Bluefish
- Namesake: The bluefish
- Ordered: 15 July 1966
- Builder: General Dynamics Electric Boat, Groton, Connecticut
- Laid down: 13 March 1968
- Launched: 10 January 1970
- Sponsored by: Mrs. David Packard
- Commissioned: 8 January 1971
- Decommissioned: 31 May 1996
- Stricken: 31 May 1996
- Motto: Blue Thunder from Down Under!
- Fate: Scrapping via Ship and Submarine Recycling Program completed 1 November 2003

General characteristics
- Class & type: Sturgeon-class attack submarine
- Displacement: 3,978 long tons (4,042 t) light; 4,270 long tons (4,339 t) full; 292 long tons (297 t) dead
- Length: 292 ft 3 in (89.08 m)
- Beam: 31 ft 8 in (9.65 m)
- Draft: 28 ft 8 in (8.74 m)
- Installed power: 15,000 shaft horsepower (11.2 megawatts)
- Propulsion: One S5W nuclear reactor, two steam turbines, one screw
- Speed: 15 knots (28 km/h; 17 mph) surfaced; 25 knots (46 km/h; 29 mph) submerged
- Test depth: 1,300 feet (396 meters)
- Complement: 109 (14 officers, 95 enlisted men)
- Armament: 4 × 21-inch (533 mm) torpedo tubes amidships aft of bow; Mark 48 torpedoes; UUM-44A SUBROC missiles; UGM-84A/C Harpoon missiles; Mark 57 deep-water mines; Mark 60 CAPTOR mines

USS Bluefish (SSN-675), a Sturgeon-class attack submarine, was the second ship of the United States Navy to be named for the bluefish.

== Construction and commissioning ==
The contract to build Bluefish was awarded to the Electric Boat Division of General Dynamics Corporation in Groton, Connecticut, on 15 July 1966 and her keel was laid down there on 13 March 1968. She was launched on 10 January 1970, sponsored by Mrs. David Packard, and commissioned on 8 January 1971.

== Propulsion Methods ==
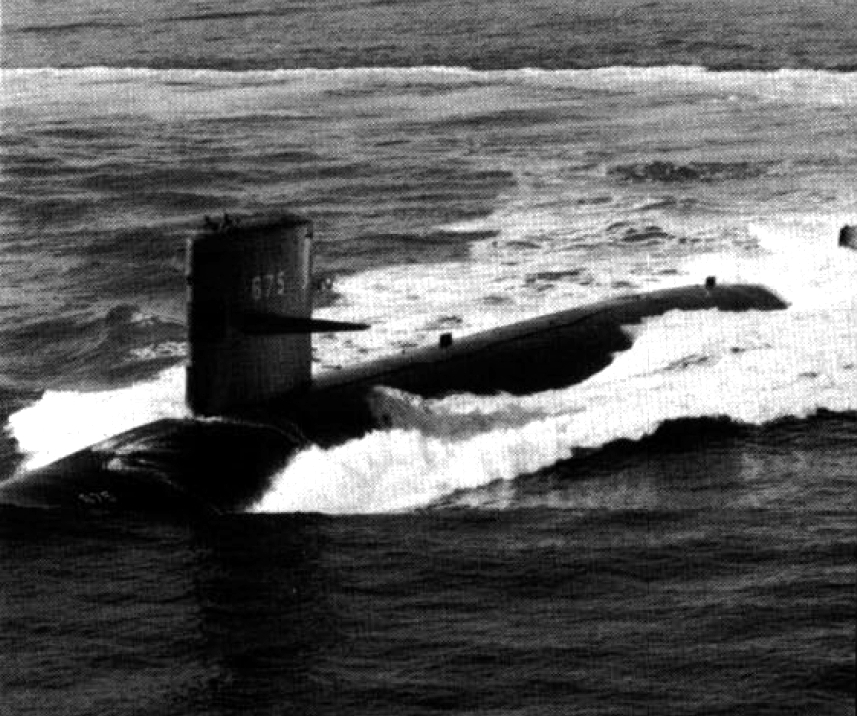
USS Bluefish Underway

The USS Bluefish was propelled by one S5W Nuclear reactor. S5W stands for S = Submarine Platform, 5 = Fifth Generation Core and W = Westinghouse as the contracted designer. The S5W is a high speed submarine reactor with the average power of 78 MWth (MegaWatt thermal) or 15,000 SHP (Shaft Horse Power). From the time the submarine was laid to its scrapping, the S5W core lifetime would last 5,500 hours at full power for older model S5Ws to 10,000 hours at full power for newer core models.

== Armament ==
The USS Bluefish had a wide variety of weapons systems available for its use. The armament included 4 x 21-inch (533 mm) torpedo Tubes, Mark 48 torpedoes; UUM-44 SUBROC anti-submarine missiles; UGM-84A/C Harpoon missiles (anti-ship), Mark 57 deep-water mines (anti-ship/submarine), and Mark 60 CAPTOR mines (anti-submarine).

The Mark 48 torpedo has been in the U.S. Navy since 1972. Each 19 feet (5.8 m), 3,434 pounds (1,558 kg) torpedo has a piston engine and pump jet capable of accelerating it past 28 knots (32 mph). The official range is greater than 5 miles (8.0 km) and it can be fired at depths down to 3,000 feet (910 m) underwater. The torpedo is guided by passive/aggressive accusative homing or wire guidance to deliver its 650 pounds (290 kg) warhead to the target. Each unit costs an average of 2.5 million dollars to produce.

The UUM-44A SUBROC missile is an anti-submarine missile. Unlike your average anti-submarine missile, the UUM-44A is designed to be fired out of the submarine into the air where it calculates its targets position and flies 55 kilometers to impact point. This weapon is so powerful it doesn't have to have a direct impact to cause significant damage to its target with its 39-inch, 460 pound W-55 thermonuclear warhead. This missile is propelled by Thiokol TE-260G solid-fuel and has the capabilities to go supersonic. The weight of each unit is 4000 pounds (1800 kg).

The UGM-84A/C Harpoon missiles are the dedicated anti-ship missiles used in the US Navy. Each unit is propelled by a Teledyne/CAE J402-CA-400 turbojet and has the range of approximately 220 km. The traveling speed of this anti-ship missile is Mach 0.85. Its warhead weights 488 pounds (221 kg) and is officially called a WDU-18/B penetrating blast-fragmentation warhead.

The Mark 57 deep-water mines were deployed beginning in 1966. The detection system to cause the fatal explosion was a total field magnetic exploder. The warhead was a HBX-3 warhead that weighed 340 pounds. The whole mine weighed 2000 pounds (909 kg) and could be laid at up to 1000 feet (305 meters).

Mark 60 CAPTOR mines begin being deployed in 1979. It is powered by a two-speed, reciprocating external combustion engine, and has a range of 8,000 yards at 28 knots. The mine weighs 2056 pounds (935 kg) with a 98-pound PBXN-103 high explosive bulk charge warhead. Its detection system is reliable acoustic path (RAP) sound propagation with a snake or circle search pattern in launch mode.

== Service history ==
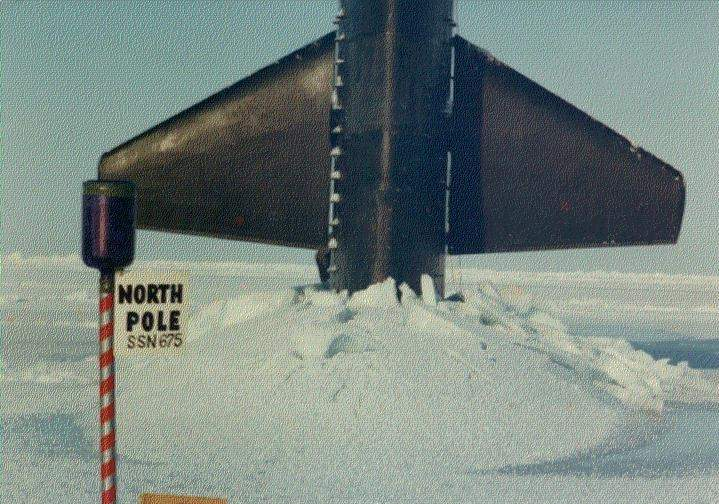
Bluefish surfacing at the North Pole on 4th May 1975.

Bluefish went on operations as a part of the U.S Sixth Fleet during the increased tensions caused by the Yom Kippur War during September 1973, in which Bluefish was then awarded the Battle Efficiency Award for its excellent operational readiness.

Bluefish circumnavigated the globe near the North Pole on 3 May 1975 and surfaced at the North Pole on 4 May 1975.

In 1977, Bluefish completed its second deployment to the Mediterranean, and, during it, became the first nuclear-powered submarine to visit Israel.

Bluefish may have been the only Sturgeon class submarine to circumnavigate the globe during extended patrol in the Indian Ocean in 1982. Bluefish was designed for stealth and surveillance, and was an integral part of the US NAVY's strategic defense during the height of the Cold War.

== Decommissioning and disposal ==
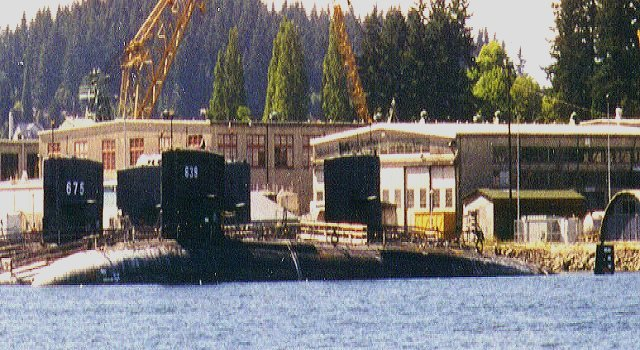
Bluefish alongside Drum (SSN-677), Ray (SSN-653), Lapon (SSN-661) and Richard B. Russell (SSN-687), awaiting scrapping at Puget Sound Naval Shipyard, Bremerton, Washington in 8 October 2001.

Bluefish was decommissioned with Commander Richard C. West in command on 31 May 1996 and stricken from the Naval Vessel Register the same day. Her scrapping via the Nuclear-Powered Ship and Submarine Recycling Program at Puget Sound Navy Yard in Bremerton, Washington, was completed on 1 November 2003.
