= USS Queenfish (SSN-651) =

Submarine of the United States

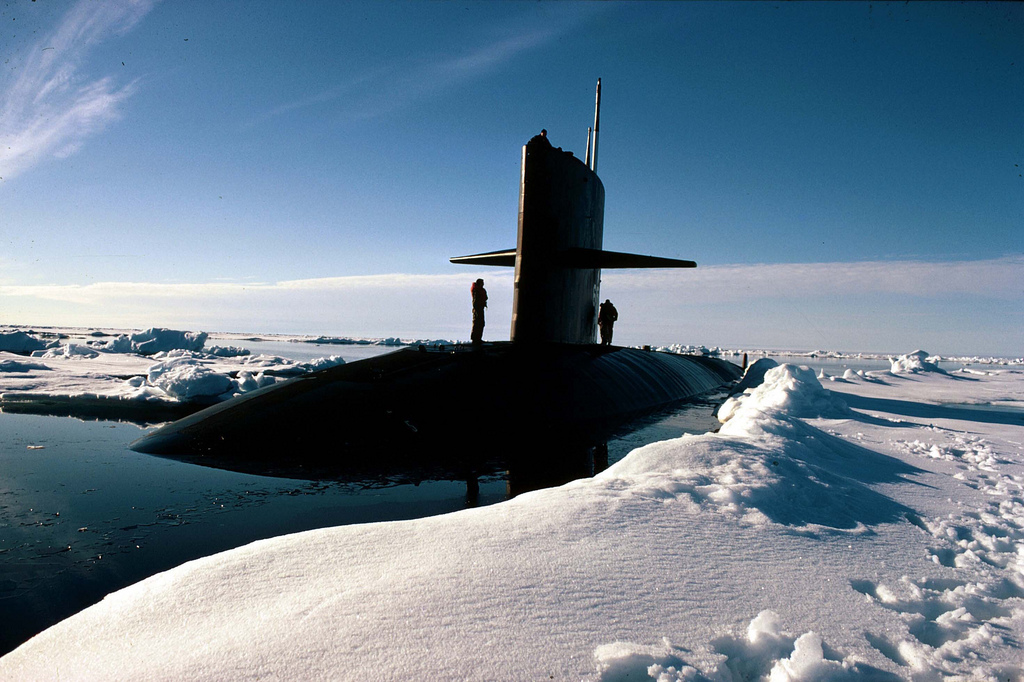
- USS Queenfish (SSN-651) at the North Pole on 6 August 1970.

History

United States
- Name: USS Queenfish
- Namesake: The queenfish
- Ordered: 26 March 1963
- Builder: Newport News Shipbuilding and Dry Dock Company, Newport News, Virginia
- Laid down: 11 May 1964
- Launched: 25 February 1966
- Sponsored by: Julia Butler Hansen (1907–1988)
- Commissioned: 6 December 1966
- Decommissioned: 8 November 1991
- Out of service: 21 September 1990
- Stricken: 14 April 1992
- Identification: SSN-651
- Motto: La Reine de la Mer; (French for "Queen of the Sea")
- Fate: Scrapping via Ship and Submarine Recycling Program begun 1 May 1992, completed 7 April 1993

General characteristics
- Class & type: Sturgeon-class submarine
- Displacement: 4,060 long tons (4,125 t) light
- Length: 292 ft (89 m)
- Beam: 31 ft (9.4 m)
- Draft: 25 ft (7.6 m)
- Installed power: 15,000 shp (11,000 kW)
- Propulsion: One S5W nuclear reactor, two steam turbines, one screw
- Speed: Over 20 knots (37 km/h; 23 mph)
- Test depth: 1,300 ft (400 m)
- Complement: 113 (14 officers, 99 enlisted men)
- Armament: 4 × 21-inch (533 mm) torpedo tubes; Mk-48 torpedo; UGM-84A Harpoon anti-ship missile; UUM-44A SUBROC missiles

USS Queenfish (SSN-651), a Sturgeon-class attack submarine, was the second ship of the United States Navy to be named for the queenfish, a small food fish found off the Pacific coast of North America.

== Construction and commissioning ==
The contract to build Queenfish was awarded to Newport News Shipbuilding and Dry Dock Company in Newport News, Virginia, on 26 March 1963 and her keel was laid down there on 11 May 1964. She was launched on 25 February 1966, sponsored by Julia Butler Hansen, U.S. Representative from Washington's 3rd Congressional District (1960–1974), and commissioned on 6 December 1966.

Queenfish was launched one day ahead of the lead ship of her class, the Sturgeon, despite being laid down 18 months later, and as a result of a multimillion-dollar bonus offered by the Navy to the Newport News shipyard. She was also commissioned in December 1966, three months ahead of Sturgeon.

== Service history ==
Queenfish spent the early months of 1967 practicing under-ice operations in the Davis Strait. She was assigned Pearl Harbor, Hawaii, as her home port and arrived there in late spring 1967 via Guantanamo Bay, the Panama Canal, and the Pacific Northwest.

In 1968, escorted by the Australian minehunter HMAS Curlew, USS Queenfish was the first nuclear-powered warship to visit Australia. Queenfish berthed at Station Pier, Melbourne, on 5 March 1968. The visit was a success, despite anti-nuclear protests. (These dates are incorrect. Queenfish did not go to Australia in 1968) The visit was in 1978.

Between 1968 and 1970 USS Queenfish (SSN-651) operated as part of the U.S. Pacific Cold War submarine force, carrying out routine Western Pacific deployments in line with mission profile of Sturgeon class attack submarines. The mission included intelligence gathering, anti submarine warfare and support of carrier groups, including covert surveillance and acoustic monitoring of enemy naval activity.

In mid-1970, Queenfish operated below the polar ice pack in the Arctic, mapping the Arctic Ocean's seabed for potential military purposes in the event of a war between the Soviet Union and the United States. She also surfaced at the North Pole in August 1970 and spent 20 days exploring the Siberian Shelf across the Laptev, East Siberian, and Chukchi seas.

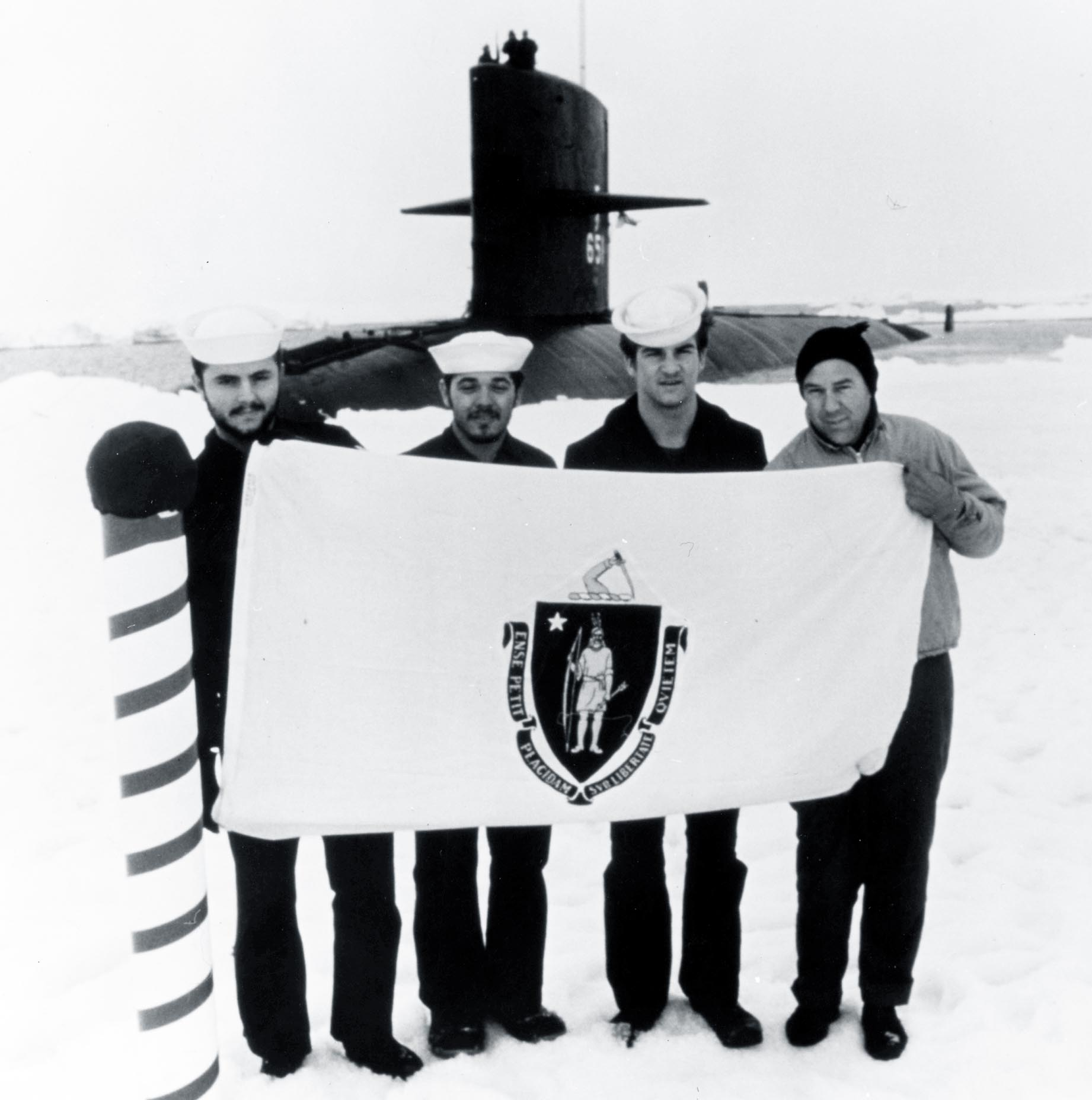
USS Queenfish crew and flag at the North Pole in August 1970

From 1970 to 1973 Queenfish completed two Pacific deployments, two Vietnam excursions, and six cold war missions. She then entered the Bremerton Navy Yard for overhaul. Queenfish revisited the North Pole in 1985 and 1988.

In the mid 1970s the Queenfish was sent to the Magnetic Silencing Facility inside of Naval Base Kitsap Bangor for deperming treatment in order to reduce its electromagnetic signature

In 1983 Hurricane Eva struck the Hawaiian Islands causing extensive damage to the infrastructure on Oahu. As per orders from COMSUBPAC all U.S. Navy submarines put to sea for the duration of the storm. Upon their return to Pearl Harbor the fleet was informed that the electrical power at Pearl had been disrupted by the hurricane. Normally, while in port, the nuclear reactors on Navy submarines are taken offline and electricity is supplied to the boats via "shore power" cables. But because of the devastation from the hurricane this was not possible. Instead, the decision was made by the U.S. Navy, in cooperation with officials from the State of Hawaii, to bring the Queenfish's reactor online, along with the reactors on two other submarines and reverse the current flow through the shore power cables. As a result, the three Navy submarines provided power to the island of Oahu for approximately 36 hours until repairs could be made to the islands power generating facilities.

July 1985 "Queenfish" deployed on a mission with the USS Aspro to the North Pole.

== Decommissioning and disposal ==
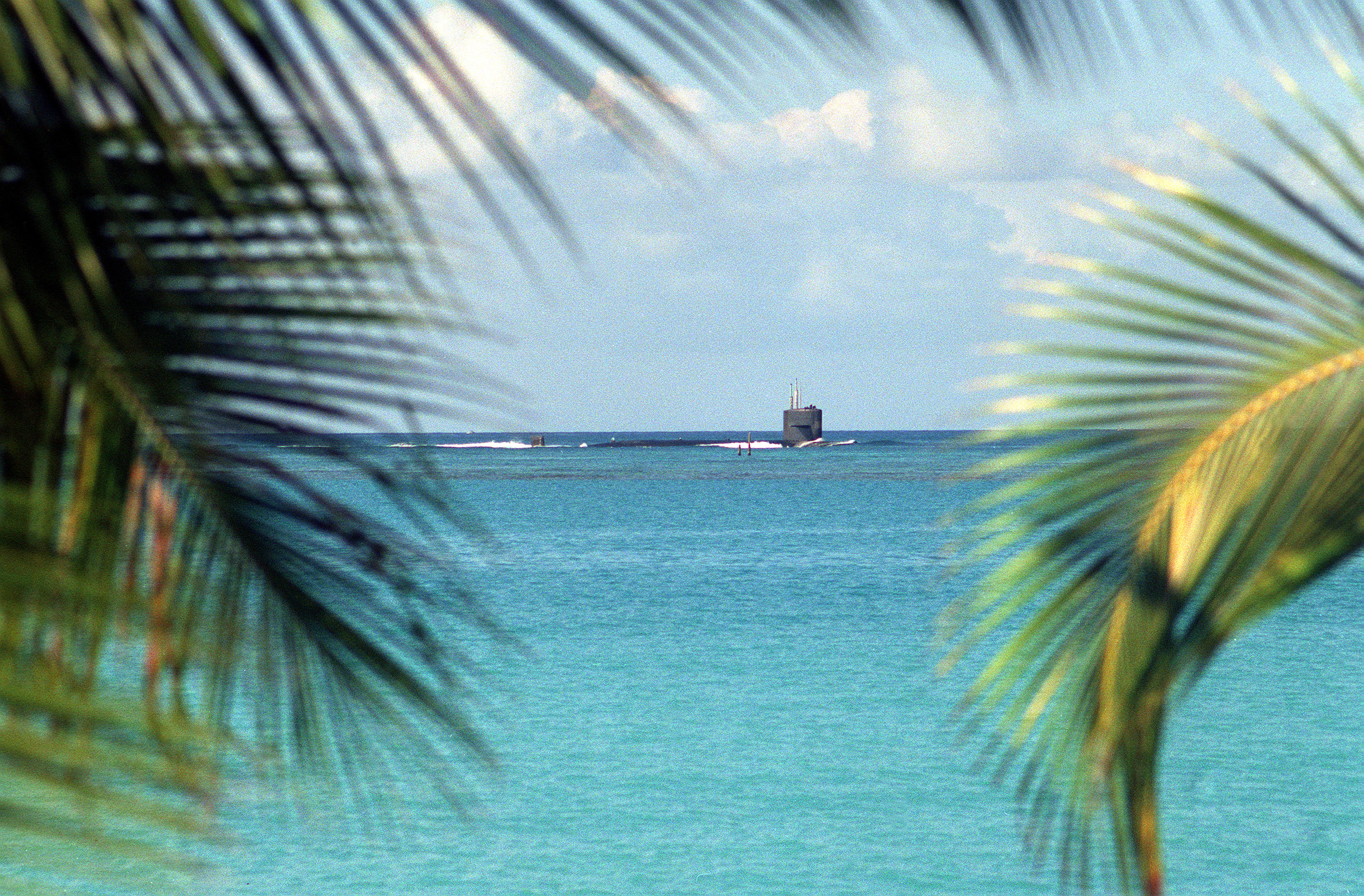
Queenfish underway near Pearl Harbor, Hawaii, on 1 June 1989.

Queenfish was deactivated on 21 September 1990, decommissioned on 8 November 1991 and stricken from the Naval Vessel Register on 14 April 1992. Her scrapping via the Nuclear-Powered Ship and Submarine Recycling Program at Puget Sound Naval Shipyard at Bremerton, Washington, began on 1 May 1992 and was completed on 7 April 1993.

The escape trunk was removed and is currently utilized at the US Army Special Forces Underwater Operations School, Key West, Florida in their Submarine Escape and Buoyant Ascent Tower.
