= USS Sand Lance (SSN-660) =

Submarine of the United States

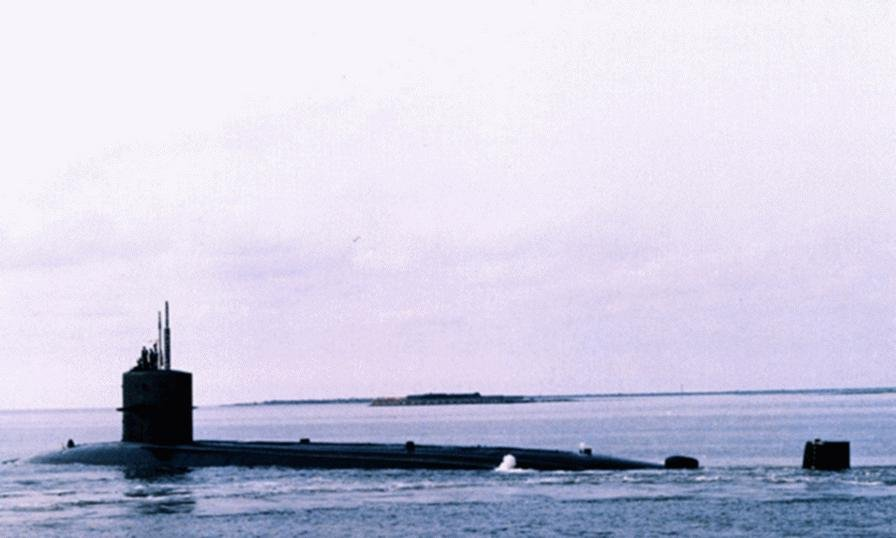
- USS Sand Lance (SSN-660) in Charleston Harbor off Charleston, South Carolina, with Fort Sumter in the background.

History

United States
- Name: USS Sand Lance (SSN-660)
- Namesake: The sand lance
- Ordered: 24 October 1963
- Builder: Portsmouth Naval Shipyard, Kittery, Maine
- Laid down: 15 January 1965
- Launched: 11 November 1969
- Sponsored by: Mrs. Thomas J. McIntyre
- Commissioned: 25 September 1971
- Decommissioned: 7 August 1998
- Stricken: 7 August 1998
- Honours and awards: Awarded Navy Unit Commendation and Navy Expeditionary Medal in 1979 for Special Operations conducted that same year.
- Fate: Scrapping via Ship and Submarine Recycling Program begun 1 April 1998, completed 30 August 1999
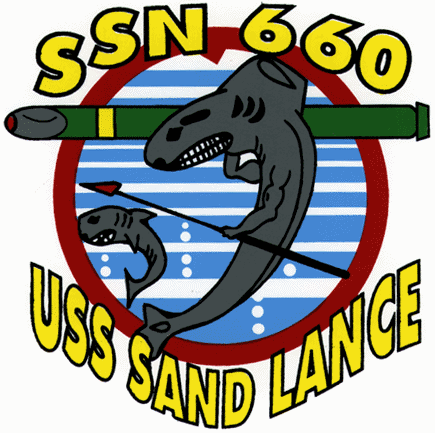
- Badge

General characteristics
- Class & type: Sturgeon-class attack submarine
- Displacement: 4,031 long tons (4,096 t) light; 4,323 long tons (4,392 t) full; 292 long tons (297 t) dead
- Length: 292 ft (89 m)
- Beam: 31 ft (9.4 m)
- Draft: 29 ft 10 in (9.09 m)
- Installed power: 15,000 shaft horsepower (11.2 megawatts)
- Propulsion: One S5W nuclear reactor, two steam turbines, one screw
- Test depth: 1,300 ft (400 m)
- Complement: 107 (12 officers, 95 enlisted men)
- Armament: 4 × 21-inch (533 mm) torpedo tubes

USS Sand Lance (SSN-660), a Sturgeon-class attack submarine, was the second ship and the second submarine of the United States Navy to be named for the sand lance, a member of the family Ammodytidae.

== Construction and commissioning ==
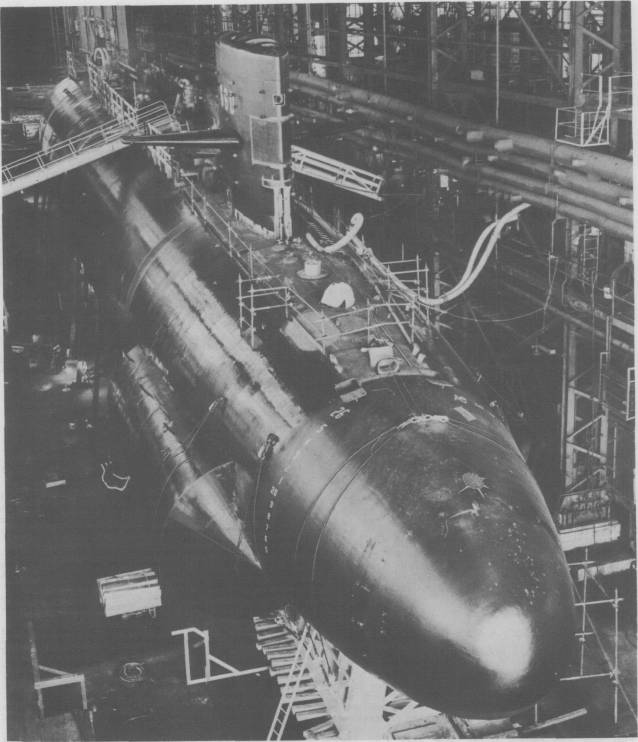
Sand Lance under construction at Portsmouth Naval Shipyard at Kittery, Maine, with temporary safety railings rigged around her deck. The external fairing on the lower hull was temporary, designed to provide added buoyancy for her bow and avoid excessive strain on her hull during her launching.

The contract to build Sand Lance was awarded to Portsmouth Naval Shipyard at Kittery, Maine, on 24 October 1963 and her keel was laid down there on 15 January 1965. She was launched on 11 November 1969, sponsored by Mrs. Thomas J. McIntyre, and commissioned on 25 September 1971. Sand Lance was the last ship to be constructed for the Navy at Portsmouth Naval Shipyard.

== Service history ==
On the day of her commissioning, Sand Lance's home port was changed from Portsmouth to Charleston, South Carolina. She spent the remainder of 1971 on shakedown. She operated in the Charleston area for the whole of 1972, then, in February 1973, stood out of Charleston for special operations. She returned to Charleston on 21 April 1973, remained in port until 11 June 1973, and then departed again on special operations. She completed these operations in August 1973 and put in at Faslane Naval Base, Scotland, on 13 August 1973. Sand Lance left Faslane on 20 August 1973 and arrived in Charleston on 5 September 1973. Sand Lance was sent to the Mediterranean to monitor shipping going through the Straits of Gibraltar during the Yom Kippur War. She then operated out of Charleston in the western Atlantic Ocean and Caribbean Sea through at least June 1974. She went through overhaul at the Norfolk Naval Shipyard in 1975 and 1976 (15 months).

In 1987, Sand Lance completed Law Enforcement Operations in the Caribbean Sea and was transferred to Portsmouth Naval Shipyard in Kittery Maine for a refueling overhaul, replacement of propeller (screw), and upgrades to hull coatings. She underwent sea trials in 1990 and returned to active service out of Charleston, SC.

In 1991, Sand Lance was deployed for six months as part of the UNITAS task force around South America. She traveled through the Panama Canal and around the southernmost tip of South America.

From October 1993 to March 1994 Sand Lance was on a Mediterranean Sea Deployment and called on ports at Naples, Italy; Monte Carlo, Monaco; U.S. Naval Support Activity Base Santo Stefano Island, Italy; Toulon, France, and Gibraltar.

In 1994 Sand Lance, while moored at Charleston – almost sank next to the pier ahead of one of her sister ships, the attack submarine USS Grayling (SSN-646), due to flooding in the engine room's lower level when a main seawater hull valve was being removed for maintenance. Plates, called blanks, had been placed over her hull penetrations by divers to avoid flooding during removal of the valve but had been placed over the wrong main seawater openings. The flooding was stopped, but not before most of the engine room's lower level was flooded.

In 1995, Sand Lance left Charleston and relocated to a new homeport in Groton, Connecticut, where she became a member of Submarine Squadron 2.

In 1996, Sand Lance was sent on a patrol to the Arctic Circle. While there, the submarine surfaced through the polar ice cap at the North Pole on 12 July.

== Decommissioning and disposal ==
Sand Lance was decommissioned on 7 August 1998 and stricken from the Naval Vessel Register the same day. Her scrapping via the Nuclear-Powered Ship and Submarine Recycling Program at Puget Sound Naval Shipyard in Bremerton, Washington, began on 1 April 1998 and was completed on 30 August 1999.

Sand Lance's Maneuvering Room Consoles, which were used to control the engines, electrical systems and nuclear reactor were displayed at the Smithsonian Institution in Washington, D.C., and are now stored there in the event of future exhibits involving nuclear submarines.
