= USS Pargo (SSN-650) =

Submarine of the United States

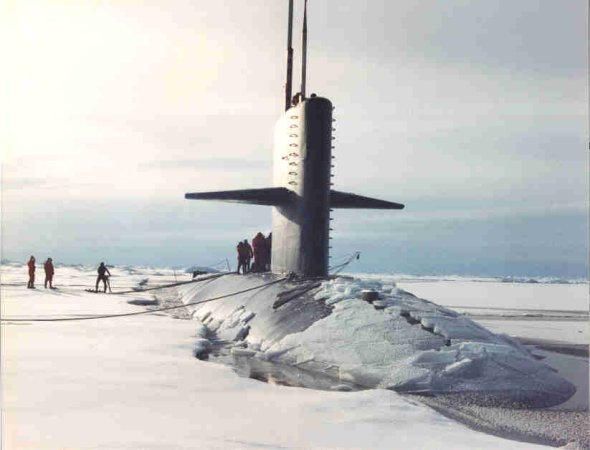
- USS Pargo (SSN-650) in the Arctic, in September 1993.

History

United States
- Name: USS Pargo (SSN-650)
- Namesake: The pargo, a fish of the genus Lutjanus also known as the red snapper
- Ordered: 26 March 1963
- Builder: General Dynamics Electric Boat, Groton, Connecticut
- Laid down: 3 June 1964
- Launched: 17 September 1966
- Sponsored by: Mrs. James L. Holloway, Jr.
- Commissioned: 5 January 1968
- Decommissioned: 14 April 1995
- Stricken: 14 April 1995
- Motto: For Land, For Honor, For Courage
- Fate: Scrapping via Ship and Submarine Recycling Program begun 1 October 1994, completed 15 October 1996

General characteristics
- Class & type: Sturgeon-class attack submarine
- Displacement: 4,600 long tons (4,674 t)
- Length: 292 ft (89 m)
- Beam: 31 ft (9.4 m)
- Draft: 28 ft 8 in (8.74 m)
- Installed power: 15,000 shaft horsepower (11.2 megawatts)
- Propulsion: One S5W nuclear reactor, two steam turbines, one screw
- Speed: Over 20 knots (37 km/h; 23 mph)
- Complement: 107
- Armament: 4 × 21-inch (533 mm) torpedo tubes; UUM-44A SUBROC missiles; Mark 48 torpedo; Tomahawk missile

USS Pargo (SSN-650), a Sturgeon-class attack submarine, was the second ship of the United States Navy to be named for the pargo, also known as the red snapper, a fish of the genus Lutjanus found in the West Indies.

== Construction and commissioning ==
The contract to build Pargo was awarded to the Electric Boat Division of General Dynamics Corporation in Groton, Connecticut, on 26 March 1963 and her keel was laid down there on 3 June 1964. She was launched on 17 September 1966, sponsored by Mrs. Jean Gordon Holloway (née Hagood), the wife of retired Admiral James L. Holloway, Jr. (1898–1984), and commissioned on 5 January 1968 with Commander Steven A. White in command.

== Service history ==
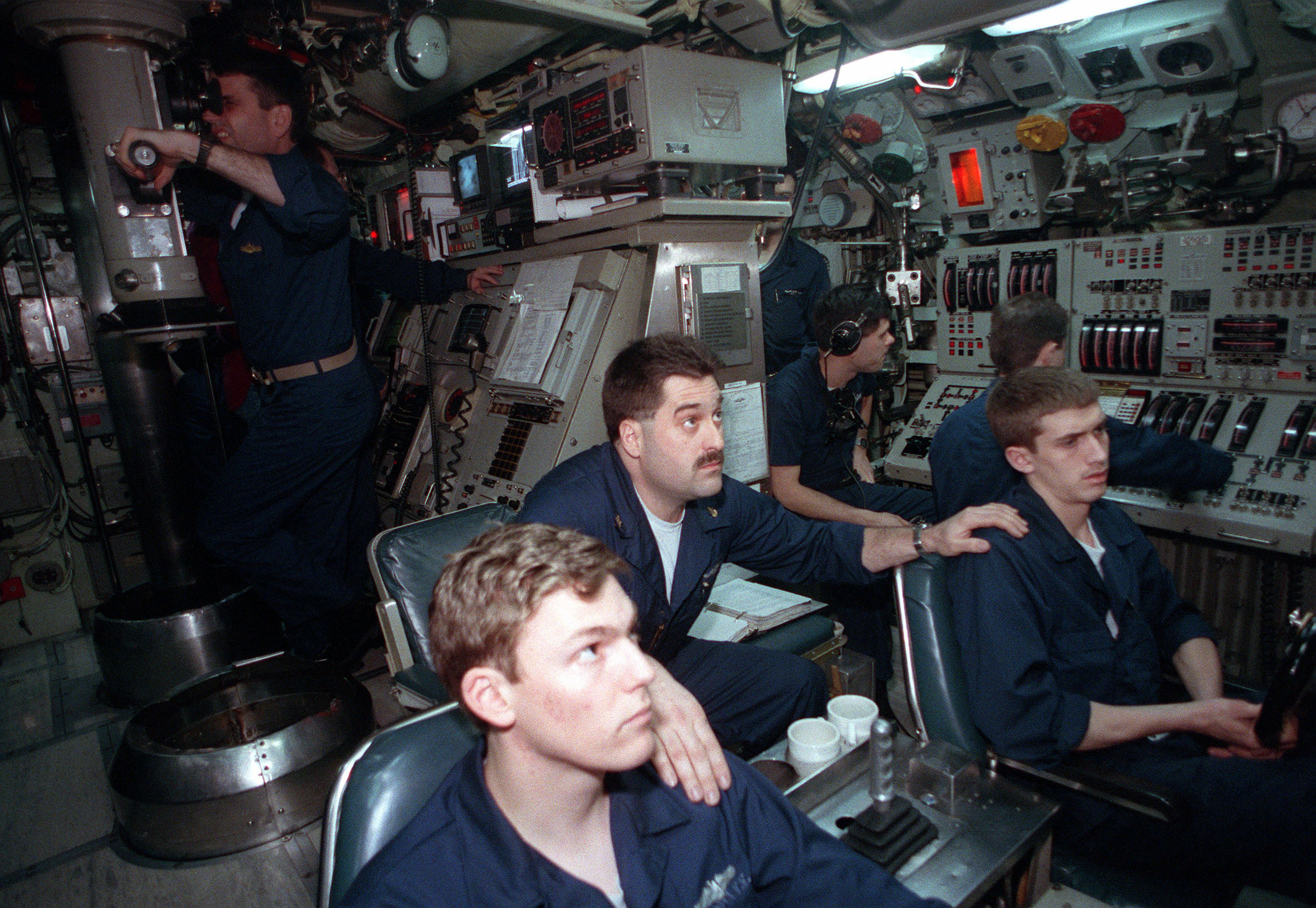
Sailors at work on the Pargo in April 1991.

=== 1960s ===
Assigned to Submarine Development Group 2 with her home port at New London, Connecticut. Pargo was altered for acoustics at Groton then was involved in acoustic trials that resulted in alterations to all U.S. submarines. After acoustic trials the Pargo spent much of its time doing arctic research, surfacing at the north pole several times. Pargo participated in the search for the missing attack submarine USS Scorpion (SSN-589) from 27 May to 7 June 1968. She spent the rest of 1968 conducting various trials in the Caribbean Sea and off New London.

=== 1970s ===
The Pargo made her 650th dive on 29 March 1978.

=== 1980s ===
The "Pargo" entered dry dock at Puget Sound Naval Shipyard (Bremerton, WA) in February 1985 for an 18-month overhaul. 30 months later the boat was back in service, having upgrades to all non-nuclear systems.

=== 1990s ===
The "Pargo" conducted the first civilian oceanographic submarine cruise of the Arctic Ocean in 1993.

== Decommissioning and disposal ==
Pargo was decommissioned on 14 April 1995 and stricken from the Naval Vessel Register the same day. Her scrapping via the Nuclear-Powered Ship and Submarine Recycling Program at Puget Sound Naval Shipyard at Bremerton, Washington, began on 1 October 1994 and was completed on 15 October 1996.

== Awards ==
- Navy Unit Citation – 4 awards (1969, 1970, 1973, 1975)
- Meritorious Unit Commendation – 4 awards (1971, 1981, 1991, 1994)
- Navy "E" Ribbon – 1 award (1980)
- Navy Expeditionary Medal
- National Defense Service Medal – 2 awards
- Sea Service Deployment Ribbon
