= USS Seahorse (SSN-669) =

Submarine of the United States

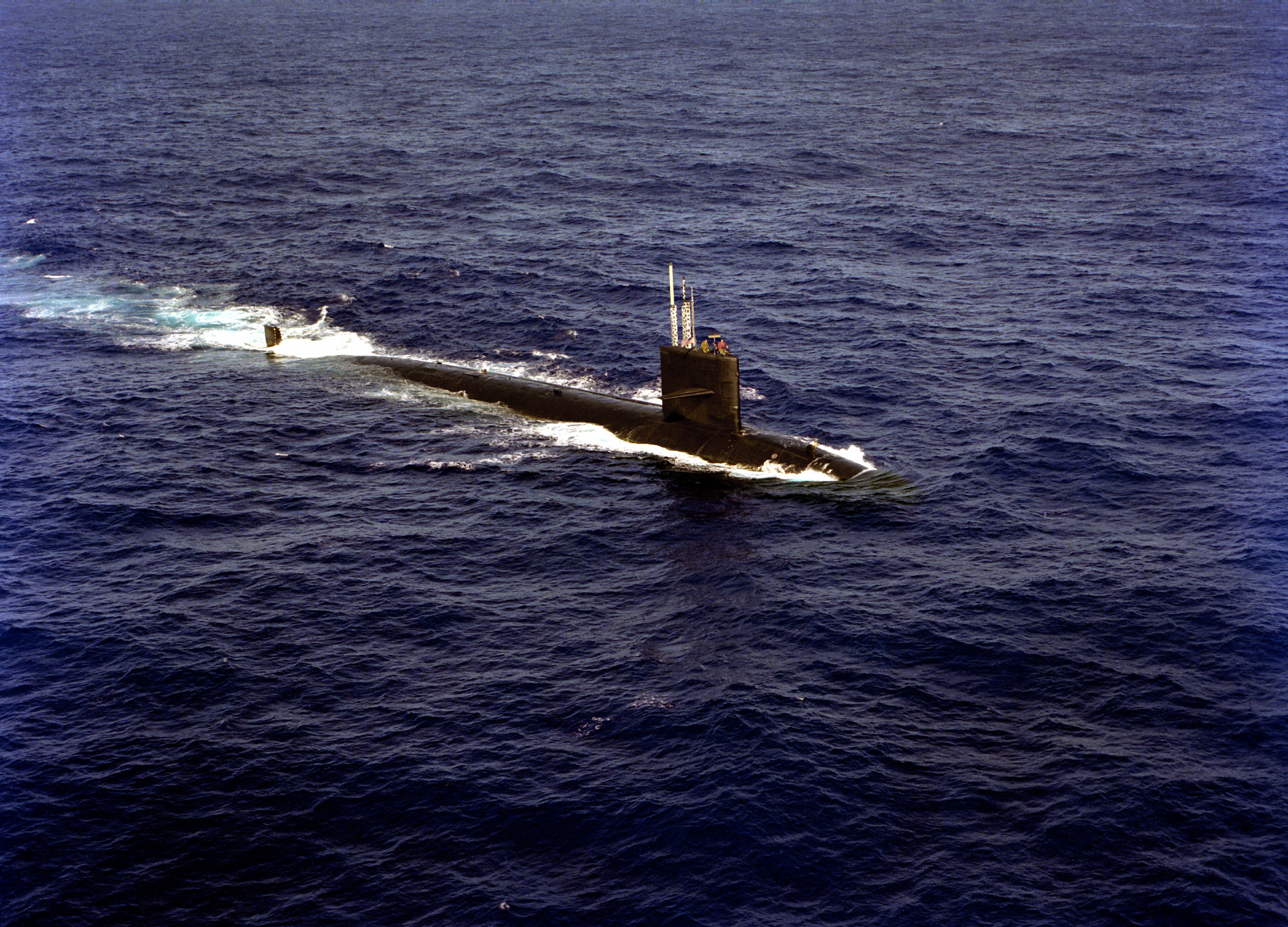
- USS Seahorse (SSN-669) on her way to the Mediterranean Sea to serve as part of the USS John F. Kennedy (CV-67) aircraft carrier battle group.

History

United States
- Name: USS Seahorse
- Namesake: The seahorse
- Ordered: 9 March 1965
- Builder: General Dynamics Electric Boat, Groton, Connecticut
- Laid down: 13 August 1966
- Launched: 15 June 1968
- Sponsored by: Mrs. Paul Ignatius
- Commissioned: 19 September 1969
- Decommissioned: 17 August 1995
- Stricken: 17 August 1995
- Motto: Thoroughbred of the Fleet
- Fate: Scrapping via Ship and Submarine Recycling Program begun 1 March 1995, completed 30 September 1996

General characteristics
- Class & type: Sturgeon-class attack submarine
- Displacement: 4,027 long tons (4,092 t) light; 4,322 long tons (4,391 t) full; 295 long tons (300 t) dead
- Length: 292 ft (89 m)
- Beam: 32 ft (9.8 m)
- Draft: 29 ft (8.8 m)
- Installed power: 15,000 shaft horsepower (11.2 megawatts)
- Propulsion: One S5W nuclear reactor, two steam turbines, one screw
- Speed: 15 knots (28 km/h; 17 mph) surfaced; 25 knots (46 km/h; 29 mph) submerged
- Test depth: 1,300 feet (396 meters)
- Complement: 108 (13 officers, 95 enlisted men)
- Armament: 4 × 21-inch (533 mm) torpedo tubes

USS Seahorse (SSN-669), a Sturgeon-class attack submarine, was the second submarine and third ship of the United States Navy to be named for the seahorse.

== Construction and commissioning ==
The contract to build Seahorse was awarded to the Electric Boat Division of General Dynamics Corporation in Groton, Connecticut, on 9 March 1965 and her keel was laid down there on 13 August 1966. She was launched on 15 June 1968, sponsored by Mrs. Paul Ignatius, and commissioned on 19 September 1969. Seahorse was the forty-seventh nuclear-powered attack submarine commissioned into the US Navy, serving until decommissioned 17 August 1995. Her ship's motto was "Thoroughbred of the Fleet."

== Service history ==
Following a shakedown cruise in the Caribbean Sea and visits to Roosevelt Roads and San Juan, Puerto Rico, and Frederiksted on St. Croix in the United States Virgin Islands, Seahorse returned to her home port, Charleston, South Carolina, joining Submarine Division 42. Through November 1970, she operated in the Atlantic Ocean and Caribbean, engaging in local operations and conducting attack submarine and antisubmarine warfare (ASW) training.

On 30 November 1970, Seahorse got underway from Charleston on her first major deployment, in which she operated in the Atlantic and visited Bremerhaven, West Germany, before returning to Charleston on 14 February 1971. For the next four months, Seahorse conducted attack submarine training, engaged in air group operations, and made final preparations for an extended Mediterranean Sea deployment. Departing Charleston on 21 June 1971, she arrived at Rota, Spain, on 2 July 1971. She continued to operate in the Mediterranean until 4 October 1971, and was awarded her first Meritorious Unit Commendation for this deployment. Upon return to home port, she operated from Charleston for the next three and one-half months.

On 24 January 1972, Seahorse ran aground and was stranded for two hours while putting out to sea from Charleston. After breaking free, she returned to port for inspection and minor repairs.

On 9 February 1972, Seahorse again departed Charleston for a North Atlantic Ocean deployment, visiting Faslane, Scotland, before returning to Charleston on 11 May 1972. During the months of June, July, and August 1972, she spent four weeks at sea in the Atlantic providing services for air groups and participating in destroyer operations. In September 1972, Seahorse departed for the North Atlantic to participate in the North Atlantic Treaty Organization Exercise "Strong Express," followed by exercises with the United Kingdom and Canada in October 1972 and with the Royal Netherlands Navy in November 1972. She returned to Charleston on 5 November 1972.

Upon the outbreak of the Yom Kippur War, Seahorse got underway on less than 24-hours notice on 25 October 1973, deploying to the Eastern Mediterranean Sea with US naval and air forces monitoring the conflict and ensuring freedom of passage.

From 16 August through 25 September 1975, Seahorse operated in company with USS Nimitz (CVN-68) and USS South Carolina (CGN-37) as part of Navy Nuclear Task Group 75. In early 1976, Seahorse again deployed to the North Atlantic for ninety consecutive days underway. On 3 November 1976, she entered the Mediterranean on a cruise which lasted until 11 May 1977.

Throughout 1978–79, Seahorse underwent nuclear refueling, overhaul, and systems update in the hands of the Charleston Naval Shipyard.

In 1980, Seahorse deployed to the North Atlantic, Norwegian Sea, and Mediterranean Sea on a five-month cruise. In July 1981, she participated in a major Second Fleet exercise that ranged from the North Atlantic to the Caribbean Sea.

Seahorse sailed for the Indian Ocean in October 1981, returning to Charleston in April 1982, after a 46,000-mile, 181-day deployment that circumnavigated the globe, and touched five of the modern Seven Seas, and all four oceans. The remainder of 1982, she deployed to the North Atlantic, conducting Deep Submergence Rescue Vehicle (DSRV) operations, and participated in the joint US-Canadian Maritime Combined Operational Training (MARCOT) 82 antisubmarine warfare exercise.

Seahorse began 1985 underway above the Arctic Circle, and spent August through October of that year deployed in the North Atlantic. In July, 1986, she again deployed to the Arctic, and surfaced through the ice at the North Pole.

Seahorse completed her second transit of the Panama Canal in early 1987, en route to Puget Sound Naval Shipyard, Bremerton, Washington for overhaul; she was in shipyard hands from February 1987 through March 1989. In May 1989 she completed her third transit of the Panama Canal, returning to her homeport of Charleston.

From March through June 1990 Seahorse again deployed to Arctic waters and the North Pole.

In 1991, Seahorse was awarded a second Meritorious Unit Commendation for operations that included under ice operations, another surfacing through the ice at the North Pole, and noteworthy operations in the North Atlantic and Mediterranean Sea. In 1993, at the midpoint of another Mediterranean deployment, Seahorse won her second Battle Efficiency 'E.'

During 1994, Seahorse deployed as the submarine element of UNITAS XXXV-94, a five-month circumnavigation of South America around Cape Horn, interoperating with Central and South American naval forces and conducting goodwill port calls. She completed her fourth transit of the Panama Canal at the conclusion of UNITAS, and returned to Charleston in December 1994.

In early 1995, Seahorse departed Charleston, her home port for twenty five years, heading to Puget Sound Naval Shipyard for deactivation. En route, she again transited the Panama Canal, and conducted Deep Submergence Rescue Vehicle operations.

USS Seahorse, the "Thoroughbred of the Fleet," was decommissioned on 17 August 1995. Over her twenty five years of service, Seahorse earned a Navy Unit Commendation, three Meritorious Unit Commendations, and two Battle Efficiency "Es."

== Commanding Officers ==
Commander George T. Harper, 19 September 1969 – 25 September 1970

Commander William E. Ratliff, 25 September 1970 – 13 December 1973

Commander Nathan A Heuberger, 13 December 1973 – 22 January 1977

Commander Henry C. McKinney, 22 January 1977 – 12 June 1980

Captain Joseph D. Sharpe Jr, 12 June 1980 – 23 August 1983

Captain Jasper B. Johnston Jr, 23 August 1983 – 11 April 1985

Commander Wynn A. Harding, 11 April 1985 – 31 August 1987

Commander Paul E. Taylor, 31 August 1987 – 22 June 1990

Commander James R. Alley, 22 June 1990 – 30 April 1993

Commander Richard N. Current, 30 April 1993 – 17 December 1995

== Decommissioning and disposal ==
Seahorse was decommissioned on 17 August 1995 and stricken from the Naval Vessel Register the same day. Her scrapping via the Nuclear-Powered Ship and Submarine Recycling Program at Puget Sound Naval Shipyard in Bremerton, Washington, began on 1 March 1995 and was completed on 30 September 1996. One of her sail planes is on public display in memorial garden at the former Sand Point Naval Air Station (now Warren G. Magnuson Park) near Seattle.
