= USS Ray (SSN-653) =

Submarine of the United States

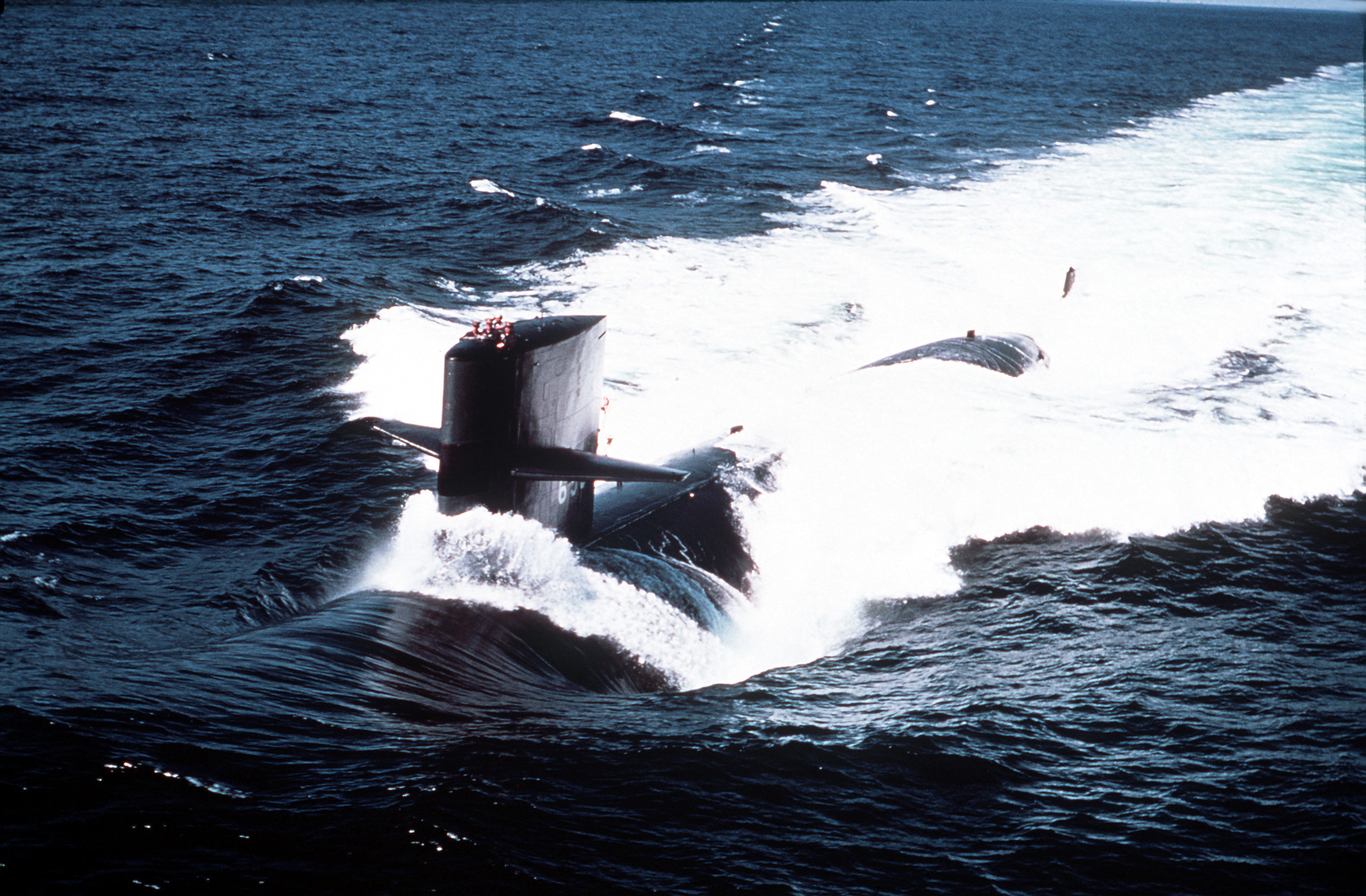
- USS Ray (SSN-653)

History

United States
- Name: USS Ray (SSN-653)
- Ordered: 26 March 1963
- Builder: Newport News Shipbuilding and Dry Dock Company
- Laid down: 4 January 1965
- Launched: 21 June 1966
- Sponsored by: Mrs. Thomas H. Kuchel
- Commissioned: 12 April 1967
- Decommissioned: 16 March 1993
- Stricken: 16 March 1993
- Fate: Scrapping via Ship and Submarine Recycling Program begun 15 March 2002, completed 30 July 2003

General characteristics
- Class & type: Sturgeon-class attack submarine
- Displacement: 3,800 long tons (3,861 t) surfaced; 4,600 long tons (4,674 t) submerged
- Length: 292 ft 3 in (89.08 m)
- Beam: 31 ft 8 in (9.65 m)
- Draft: 28 ft 8 in (8.74 m)
- Installed power: 15,000 shaft horsepower (11.2 megawatts)
- Propulsion: One S5W nuclear reactor, two steam turbines, one screw
- Speed: 20 knots (37 km/h; 23 mph)+
- Test depth: 1,300 feet (396 meters)
- Complement: 107
- Armament: 4 × 21-inch (533 mm) torpedo tubes

USS Ray (SSN-653), a Sturgeon-class attack submarine, was the second ship of the United States Navy to be named for the rays.

== Construction and commissioning ==
The contract to build Ray was awarded to Newport News Shipbuilding and Dry Dock Company at Newport News, Virginia, on 26 March 1963 and her keel was laid down there on 4 January 1965. She was launched on 21 June 1966, sponsored by Mrs. Thomas H. Kuchel, the wife of United States Senator Thomas H. Kuchel (1910–1994) of California, and commissioned on 12 April 1967.

== Service history ==
With her home port at Norfolk, Virginia, Ray underwent shakedown training and weapons and sonar testing until 6 October 1967, when she deployed to conduct Atlantic Ocean submarine operations until 12 December 1967.

In 1968 Ray again deployed for submarine operations in the Atlantic, from 8 April to 10 June and again from 13 November to 20 December.

Ray January through May 1969 in attack submarine training and fleet exercises off the United States East Coast and in the Caribbean Sea. She departed Norfolk on 6 June 1969 on a special operation before proceeding to Holy Loch, Scotland, where she arrived on 26 June 1969. She departed Holy Loch on 31 July 1969 and returned to Norfolk on 12 August. For the remainder of 1969 and into 1970, Ray trained in the Atlantic with other units of the fleet.

Ray spent most of 1970 operating in the Atlantic out of Norfolk. Her operations were concentrated primarily upon training and testing. In December 1970, she entered Norfolk Naval Shipyard at Portsmouth, Virginia, for a 14-month overhaul period. After its completion, she departed Norfolk on 5 March 1972 and engaged in various tests and exercises—notably two North Atlantic Treaty Organization exercises, "Strong Express" and "Escort Deep"—during the remainder of 1972. She returned to Norfolk on 12 December 1972.

Ray departed Norfolk in late February 1973 to conduct a Mediterranean Sea cruise which lasted until mid-summer, at which time she returned to Norfolk and normal Atlantic operations.

The Ray performed Atlantic operations until August 1975 when it was transferred to SubRon4 in Charleston SC, where it underwent an extensive 18-month overhaul and refueling. After the overhaul the Ray went to New London CT for refresher training and then for a month in the Caribbean (Puerto Rico and St. Croix) for shakedown and sonar calibration.

In August 1977 the Ray was deployed to a Med cruise. On 20 September 1977 Ray struck a coral mountain while submerged in the Mediterranean Sea 10 miles (16 km) off the coast of Tunisia due to a combination of equipment failure and crew inexperience. Her nose was blown open by a hydraulic displacement of water, making two "wings" on the port side. The sonar equipment was destroyed and there were several cracks along the hull. There was no other damage to the submarine, but quite a few crew members sustained contusions and got banged around. The worst injuries were sustained by a crew member thrown the length of Auxiliary Machinery 2, who had a dislocated hip and needed 70 stitches. The boat limped to La Maddalena, Sardinia, to cut off the wings, remove loose equipment and shore up the hull. This was followed by a surface transit back to the states for repairs that required a year of work at Charleston Naval Shipyard in Charleston, South Carolina.

From 1977 through 1988 Ray made numerous Mediterranean and North Atlantic deployments including an ICE-EX in 1986 where she surfaced at the North Pole along with sister ships USS Hawkbill (SSN-666) and USS Archerfish (SSN-678), the first time three attack submarines had ever surfaced at the pole together. In 1988 and again in 1991 she deployed north of the Arctic Circle, earning a Meritorious Unit Citation, Navy Expeditionary Medal and Arctic Service Ribbon each time.

Ray participated in a six-month Mediterranean cruise as a part of the USS Forrestal (CVA-59) aircraft carrier battle group from October 1989 to April 1990. She participated in various exercises and underwater operations which included operating in the Gulf of Sidra inside what Libya claimed was the "Line of Death" that formed the boundary of Libyan territorial waters, a territorial claim the United States did not recognize. She pulled into several liberty ports during this cruise, including La Maddalena in Italy, Cannes and Toulon in France, and Gibraltar. After her return to Charleston, she underwent routine repairs in drydock the Charleston Naval Shipyard.

At the time of Ray's deactivation in 1992, she had earned five Navy Unit Citations, six Meritorious Unit Citations, six Navy Expeditionary Medals and at least three Arctic Service ribbons, making Ray one of the most-decorated attack submarines in the Atlantic Fleet.

== Decommissioning and disposal ==
Ray was decommissioned on 16 March 1993 and stricken from the Naval Vessel Register the same day. Her scrapping via the Nuclear-Powered Ship and Submarine Recycling Program at Puget Sound Naval Shipyard at Bremerton, Washington, began on 15 March 2002 and was completed on 30 July 2003.
