= Special Hull Treatment =

Special Hull Treatment was the process, devised in the 1980s, by which defense contractors coated the outsides of the hulls of submarines with a rubberized tile that was designed to deaden noise, redirect sound waves, and absorb or contain hull noise.

The tiles, measuring about 12 inches square resemble an octopus tentacle. They are actually constructed in a quadrahedral formation, in which the bottom sides have an array of holes. The holes connect to a central port in the center of the tile. This port is where a vacuum source is applied to pull a vacuum once the hole tile has been laid on the hull and glued with an epoxy. The epoxy takes about 1 day to harden, after which the vacuum is removed to make sure the tile has a good seal indicated by the vacuum not dissipating.

The tiles' shape is like the facets of a diamond or gemstone. It has four angles, and the construction of the tile is a soft black rubber with lead shavings impregnated in it. Each tile is fitted on the hull, and a caulk is applied in the seams between the tiles. The hull has to be sandblasted to bare metal and then re-coated with a special paint. The epoxy is applied to that paint. During the process, the hull is maintained above the dewpoint and in a controlled environment so that condensation does not occur during the process.

The first sub to receive this hull treatment was the USS Batfish, c. 1980.
