= Mark 60 CAPTOR =

American antisubmarine naval mine

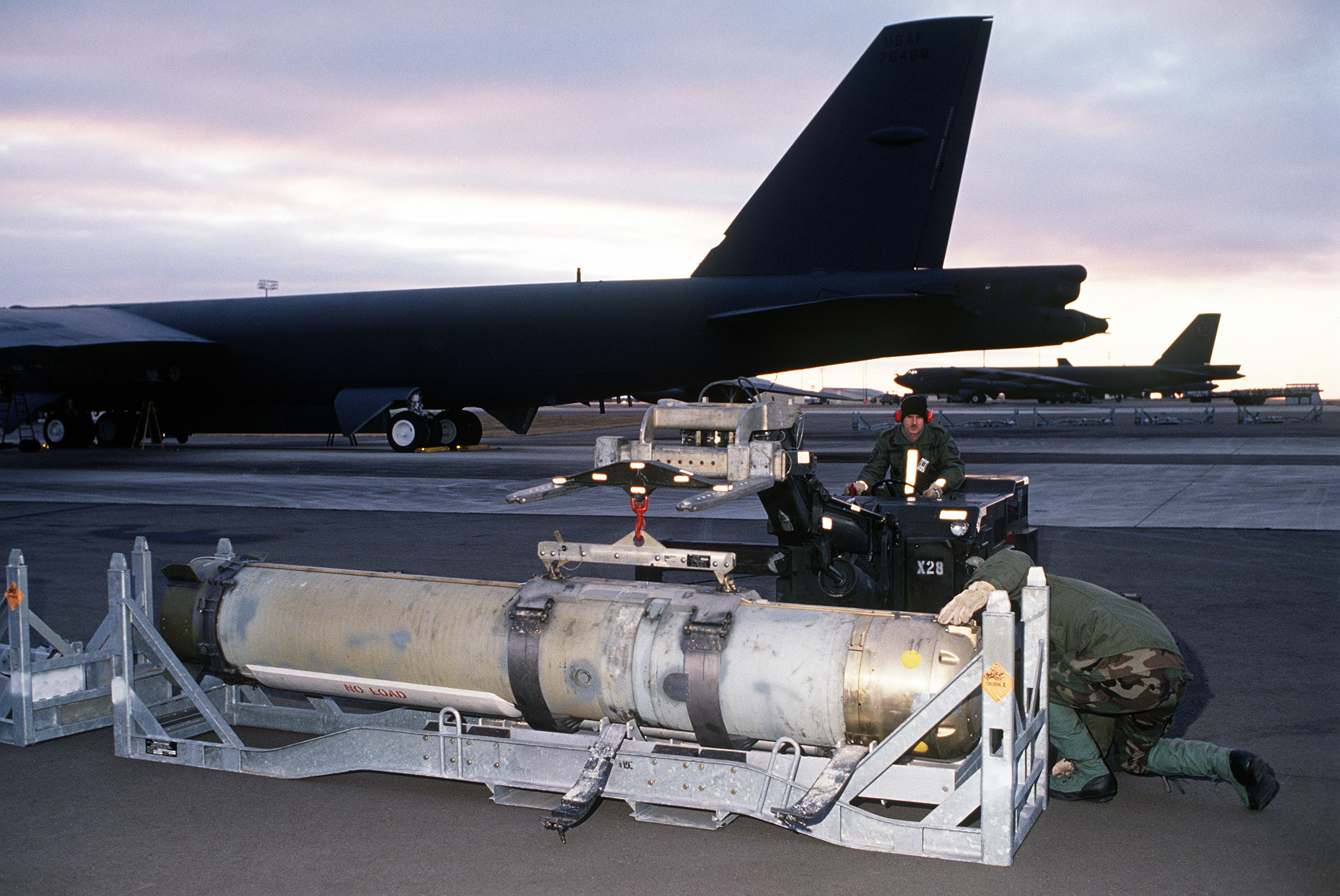
- Mark 60 mine being loaded into a B-52 Stratofortress at Loring Air Force Base in 1989
- Type: Antisubmarine naval mine
- Place of origin: United States

Service history
- In service: 1979-2001
- Used by: United States Navy
- Wars: Cold War

Production history
- Designer: Goodyear Aerospace
- Manufacturer: Goodyear Aerospace
- Unit cost: US $113,000 (FY78); US $113,000 or US $377,000 (FY86)
- Produced: 1978-1986
- Variants: Mine Mk 66, Mk 46 Mod 5 (NEARTIP)

Specifications
- Mass: Aircraft/ship-laid:1,077 kg (2,374 lb); Submarine-laid:935 kg (2,061 lb)
- Length: Aircraft/ship-laid:3.68 m (145 in); Submarine-laid:3.35 m (132 in)
- Diameter: 530 mm (21 in)
- Effective firing range: 8,000 yards (7,300 m)
- Warhead: Mark 46 torpedo
- Warhead weight: 44 kg (97 lb), PBXN-103
- Engine: Two-speed, reciprocating external combustion
- Propellant: Otto fuel II
- Maximum depth: 1,000 feet (300 m)
- Maximum speed: >28 knots (52 km/h)
- Guidance system: Active or passive/active acoustic homing, snake or circle search, reliable acoustic path (RAP) sound propagation
- Launch platform: Aircraft, surface ship and submarines

The Mark 60 CAPTOR (Encapsulated Torpedo) is the United States' only deep-water anti-submarine naval mine. It uses a Mark 46 torpedo contained in an aluminum shell that is anchored to the ocean floor. The mine can be placed by either aircraft, submarine or surface vessel. The torpedo, once placed, can last anywhere from weeks to months underwater. The original production contract of the CAPTOR mine was awarded to Goodyear Aerospace in 1972, and entered service in 1979. It was hoped to reduce minefield costs and used in the creation of a barrier of the "Greenland-Iceland-United Kingdom gap to interrupt Soviet submarines in the event that deterrence failed."

The mine uses Reliable Acoustic Path (RAP) sound propagation to passively identify and track the difference between hostile submarine signatures, surface vessels and friendly submarines. Once identified, the torpedo leaves its casing to destroy its target.

The concept of the weapon was revisited by the US Navy with the Hammerhead mine in the 21st century, which functions in the same way and is planned to be deployed by unmanned submarines.
