= S5W reactor =

United States Navy nuclear reactor

The S5W reactor is a nuclear reactor used by the United States Navy to provide electricity generation and propulsion on warships. The S5W designation stands for:

- S = Submarine platform
- 5 = Fifth generation core designed by the contractor
- W = Westinghouse was the contracted designer

== History ==
The S5W was the standard reactor for submarines of the United States Navy from its first use in 1959 on USS Skipjack until the introduction of the Los Angeles-class submarines with S6G reactor in the mid-1970s. One S5W plant was also used in the United Kingdom on the Royal Navy's first nuclear-powered submarine HMS Dreadnought.

Some time before 1971, the S5W vessel and core replaced the S1W reactor vessel and core at the S1W prototype facility. Even though operating an S5W reactor core, the facility continued to be called S1W. To use the additional power generated by the S5W reactor at higher power levels, steam dumps were constructed in the same S1W building but outside the original submarine style hull.

== Design ==
This pressurized water reactor's simplicity, overdesign, and redundancy was intended for ease of operation and tolerance of battle damage. These characteristics contributed greatly to the type's reliability, longevity, and excellent safety record.

Later-model S5W reactor plants were often refueled with a S3G core-3, the third version of the S3G core.
