= List of ship launches in 1963 =

The list of ship launches in 1963 includes a chronological list of all ships launched in 1963.

Date	Ship	Class	Builder	Location	Country	Notes
8 January	Benjamin Stoddert	Charles F. Adams-class destroyer	Lockheed Shipbuilding	Seattle, Washington	United States	
12 January	John Adams	Lafayette-class submarine	Portsmouth Naval Shipyard	Kittery, Maine	United States	
12 January	Nathan Hale	Lafayette-class submarine	Electric Boat	Groton, Connecticut	United States	
15 January	Oceanic	Cruise ship	Cantieri Riuniti dell' Adriatico	Monfalcone	Italy	For Home Lines
22 January	Queen of Esquimalt	V-class ferry	Burrad Dry Dock Co. Ltd.	North Vancouver	Canada	For BC Ferries
25 January	Lossiebank	Cargo ship	Harland & Wolff	Belfast	United Kingdom	For Bank Line.
28 January	Parahaki	Firefighting tug	Brooke Marine Ltd.	Lowestoft	United Kingdom	For Whangarei Harbour Board.
29 January	S.W.2	Sludge carrier	J. Bolson & Son Ltd.	Poole	United Kingdom	For County and City of Exeter.
30 January	U-6	Type 205 submarine	HDW	Kiel	West Germany	For German Navy
February	Primrose	Tug	N Holmans & Sons	Penzance	United Kingdom	First ship to be launched at Penzance in nearly 100 years.
22 February	Woodrow Wilson	Lafayette-class submarine	Mare Island Naval Shipyard	Vallejo, California	United States	
26 February	Waddell	Charles F. Adams-class destroyer	Todd Pacific Shipyards	Seattle, Washington	United States	
27 February	Raumanga	Firefighting tug	Brooke Marine Ltd.	Lowestoft	United Kingdom	For Whangarei Harbor Board.
2 March	Wilhelmshaven		Rolandwerft GmbH	Bremen	West Germany	For Schiffahrts-Gesellschaft "Jade" GmbH
12 March	Siyanah	Buoy tender	J. Bolson & Son Ltd.	Poole	United Kingdom	For Abu Dhabi Marine Areas Ltd.
15 March	James Madison	James Madison-class submarine	Newport News Shipbuilding	Newport News, Virginia	United States	
16 March	Guadalcanal	Iwo Jima-class amphibious assault ship	Philadelphia Navy Yard	Philadelphia, Pennsylvania	United States	
24 March	Raffaello	Ocean liner	Cantieri Riuniti dell' Adriatico	Monfalcone	Italy	For Italian Line
6 April	Richmond K. Turner	Leahy-class cruiser	New York Shipbuilding	Camden, New Jersey	United States	
7 April	Varyag	Project 58 Groznyy-class cruiser	A.A. Zhdanov	Leningrad	Soviet Union	For Soviet Navy
10 April	U-7	Type 205 submarine	HDW	Kiel	West Germany	For German Navy
24 April	Jack	Permit-class submarine	Portsmouth Naval Shipyard	Kittery, Maine	United States	
27 April	Daniel Webster	Lafayette-class submarine	Electric Boat	Groton, Connecticut	United States	
27 April	Annapolis	Annapolis-class destroyer	Halifax Shipyards	Halifax, Nova Scotia	Canada	
4 May	Hessen	Hamburg-class destroyer	H. C. Stülcken Sohn	Hamburg	West Germany	For German Navy
12 May	Marsdiep		Zaanlandsche Scheepsbouw Maatschappij	Zaandam	Netherlands	For Texels Eigen Stoomboot Onderneming
23 May	Galatea	Leander-class frigate	Swan Hunter	Wallsend	United Kingdom	
6 June	Euryalus	Leander-class frigate	Scotts Shipbuilding & Engineering	Greenock	United Kingdom	
15 June	Mars	Mars-class combat stores ship	National Steel & Shipbuilding	San Diego, California	United States	
15 June	Ivan Franko	Ivan Franko-class passenger ship	V.E.B. Mathias-Thesen Werft	Wismar	East Germany	For Black Sea Shipping Company
15 June	Ōi	Isuzu-class destroyer escort			Japan	
19 June	U-8	Type 205 submarine	HDW	Kiel	West Germany	For German Navy
21 June	Kitakami	Isuzu-class destroyer escort			Japan	
22 June	Flasher	Permit-class submarine	Electric Boat	Groton, Connecticut	United States	
21 June	Roybank	Cargo ship	Harland & Wolff	Belfast	United Kingdom	For Bank Line.
22 June	Daniel Boone	James Madison-class submarine	Mare Island Naval Shipyard	Vallejo, California	United States	
22 June	John C. Calhoun	James Madison-class submarine	Newport News Shipbuilding	Newport News, Virginia	United States	
22 June	Tecumseh	James Madison-class submarine	Electric Boat	Groton, Connecticut	United States	
7 July	PF-103	Bayandor-class corvette	Levingston Shipbuilding Company	Orange, Texas	United States	For transfer to Imperial Iranian Navy.
19 July	Brooke	Brooke-class frigate	Lockheed Shipbuilding	Seattle, Washington	United States	
20 July	Belknap	Belknap-class cruiser	Bath Iron Works	Bath, Maine	United States	
22 July	Sand Lark	Dredger	J. Bolson & Son Ltd.	Poole	United Kingdom	For South Coast Shipping Co. Ltd.
3 August	La Salle	Raleigh-class amphibious transport dock	New York Naval Shipyard	Brooklyn, New York	United States	
8 August	Fingal	Lighthouse tender	Blythwood Shipbuilding Co. Ltd.	Glasgow	United Kingdom	For Commissioners of Northern Lights.
10 August	Sylvania	Mars-class combat stores ship	National Steel & Shipbuilding	San Diego, California	United States	
19 August	Rimfonn	Tanker	Harland & Wolff	Belfast	United Kingdom	For Sigval Bergsen.
20 August	Sagar	Pilot vessel	Blyth Dry Docks & Shipbuilding Co. Ltd	Blyth	United Kingdom	For Calcutta Port Commission.
14 September	Sacramento	Sacramento-class fast combat support ship	Puget Sound Naval Shipyard	Bremerton, Washington	United States	
19 September	Methane Progress	LNG carrier	Harland & Wolff	Belfast	United Kingdom	For Methane Tanker Finance Co.
26 September	Perth	Perth-class destroyer	Defoe Shipbuilding Company	Bay City, Michigan	United States	For Royal Australian Navy
5 October	Amatsukaze	Unique destroyer	Mitsubishi Heavy Industries		Japan	
10 October	PF-104	Bayandor-class corvette	Levingston Shipbuilding Company	Orange, Texas	United States	For transfer to Imperial Iranian Navy.
15 October	Ramsey	Brooke-class frigate	Lockheed Shipbuilding	Seattle, Washington	United States	
18 October	Von Steuben	James Madison-class submarine	Newport News Shipbuilding	Newport News, Virginia	United States	
29 October	Prinsesse Elisabeth	Ferry	Aalborg Værft A/S	Aalborg	Denmark	For DSB Färjedivision
29 October	Ilmatar	Ferry	Wärtsilä Hietalahti shipyard	Helsinki	Finland	For Finland Steamship Company
31 October	Garcia	Garcia-class frigate	Bethlehem Steel	San Francisco, California	United States	
1 November	Cambridge Ferry	Train ferry	Hawthorn Leslie and Company	Hebburn	United Kingdom	For British Railways Board
2 November	Ulysses S. Grant	James Madison-class submarine	Electric Boat	Groton, Connecticut	United States	
4 November	Naiad	Leander-class frigate	Yarrow Shipbuilders	Glasgow	United Kingdom	
5 November	Arethusa	Leander-class frigate	J. Samuel White	Cowes	United Kingdom	
17 October	Carlton	Bulk carrier	Short Brothers Ltd.	Sunderland	United Kingdom	For Chapman & Willan Ltd.
29 November	Samudra	Pilot vessel	Blyth Dry Docks & Shipbuilding Co. Ltd	Blyth	United Kingdom	For Calcutta Port Commission.
30 November	Stonewall Jackson	James Madison-class submarine	Mare Island Naval Shipyard	Vallejo, California	United States	
30 November	Kinn	Kobben-class submarine	Nordseewerke	Emden	West Germany	For Royal Norwegian Navy
2 December	Josephus Daniels	Belknap-class cruiser	Bath Iron Works	Bath, Maine	United States	
3 December	Valiant	Valiant-class submarine	Vickers-Armstrongs		United Kingdom	
3 December	Queen of Nanaimo	Burnaby-class ferry	Victoria Machinery Depot Co. Ltd	Victoria	Canada	For BC Ferries
3 December	Ruwais	Tug	J. Bolson & Son Ltd.	Poole	United Kingdom	For Shell Company of Qatar Ltd.
7 December	Schofield	Brooke-class frigate	Lockheed Shipbuilding	Seattle, Washington	United States	
17 December	Apollo	Ferry	Sölvesborg Varv Ab	Sölvesborg	Sweden	For Rederi AB Slite
19 December	Fearless	Fearless-class landing platform dock	Harland & Wolff	Belfast	United Kingdom	For Royal Navy.
20 December	Sam Rayburn	James Madison-class submarine	Newport News Shipbuilding	Newport News, Virginia	United States	
27 December	Hopper Barge No.3	Hopper barge	G. & J. Weir (Holdings) Ltd.	Renfrew	United Kingdom	For Calcutta Port Commissioners.
31 December	Weybank	Cargo ship	Harland & Wolff	Belfast	United Kingdom	For Bank Line.
Unknown date	Bill Cole	Tender	J. Bolson & Son Ltd.	Poole	United Kingdom	For Pool Harbour Commissioners.
Unknown date	Vasabha	Tug	G. Brown & Co (Marine) Ltd.	Greenock	United Kingdom	For Colombo Port Commission.
Unknown date	Welsh Prince	Fishing trawler	Atlantic Shipbuilding Co. Ltd	Newport	United Kingdom	For Welsh Fisheries Ltd.
Unknown date	Welsh Princess	Fishing trawler	Atlantic Shipbuilding Co. Ltd	Newport	United Kingdom	For Welsh Fisheries Ltd.
Unknown date	401	Barge	Alabama Drydock and Shipbuilding Company	Mobile, Alabama	United States	For McPhilips Packing Corp.
Unknown date	402	Barge	Alabama Drydock and Shipbuilding Company	Mobile, Alabama	United States	For McPhilips Packing Corp.
Unknown date	403	Barge	Alabama Drydock and Shipbuilding Company	Mobile, Alabama	United States	For McPhilips Packing Corp.
Unknown date	404	Barge	Alabama Drydock and Shipbuilding Company	Mobile, Alabama	United States	For McPhilips Packing Corp.
Unknown date	405	Barge	Alabama Drydock and Shipbuilding Company	Mobile, Alabama	United States	For McPhilips Packing Corp.
Unknown date	406	Barge	Alabama Drydock and Shipbuilding Company	Mobile, Alabama	United States	For McPhilips Packing Corp.
Unknown date	407	Barge	Alabama Drydock and Shipbuilding Company	Mobile, Alabama	United States	For McPhilips Packing Corp.
Unknown date	408	Barge	Alabama Drydock and Shipbuilding Company	Mobile, Alabama	United States	For McPhilips Packing Corp.
Unknown date	501	Hopper barge	Alabama Drydock and Shipbuilding Company	Mobile, Alabama	United States	For McPhilips Packing Corp.
Unknown date	502	Hopper barge	Alabama Drydock and Shipbuilding Company	Mobile, Alabama	United States	For McPhilips Packing Corp.
Unknown date	503	Hopper barge	Alabama Drydock and Shipbuilding Company	Mobile, Alabama	United States	For McPhilips Packing Corp.
Unknown date	504	Hopper barge	Alabama Drydock and Shipbuilding Company	Mobile, Alabama	United States	For McPhilips Packing Corp.
Unknown date	505	Hopper barge	Alabama Drydock and Shipbuilding Company	Mobile, Alabama	United States	For McPhilips Packing Corp.
Unknown date	506	Hopper barge	Alabama Drydock and Shipbuilding Company	Mobile, Alabama	United States	For McPhilips Packing Corp.
Unknown date	507	Hopper barge	Alabama Drydock and Shipbuilding Company	Mobile, Alabama	United States	For McPhilips Packing Corp.
Unknown date	508	Hopper barge	Alabama Drydock and Shipbuilding Company	Mobile, Alabama	United States	For McPhilips Packing Corp.
