= Submarine Squadron 15 =

Submarine Squadron Fifteen
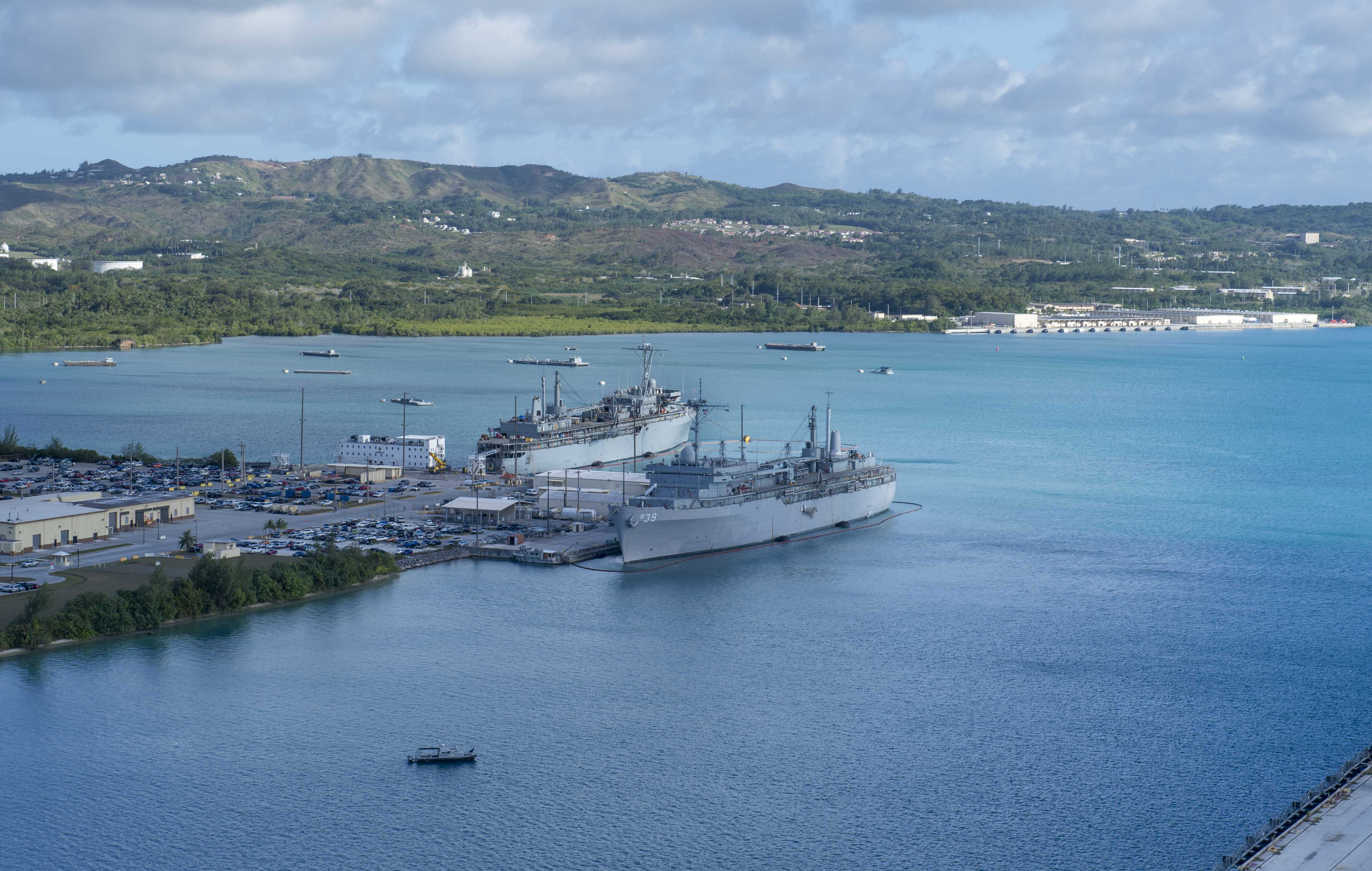
- Tenders USS Emory S. Land and USS Frank Cable at Inner Apra Harbor, Polaris Point, Naval Base Guam, the homeport of SUBRON 15, in 2018
- Active: 1963–1981, 2001–present
- Country: United States of America
- Branch: United States Navy
- Part of: United States Pacific Fleet
- Garrison/HQ: Naval Base Guam

Submarine Squadron 15 (also known as SUBRON 15) is a squadron of submarines of the United States Navy based at Naval Base Guam.

== Fleet Ballistic Missile squadron 1963–1981 ==
Submarine Squadron Fifteen was established on 1 September 1963 at Pearl Harbor, Hawaii. The squadron was formed to take over responsibility for the submarine-based nuclear deterrent in the Pacific from Submarine Squadron 1, which at the time operated submarines carrying the Regulus cruise missile. Four of the seven submarines scheduled for this squadron were being built at the time, and the submarine tender USS Proteus was undergoing overhaul at the Charleston Naval Shipyard.

During the first few months, the squadron established headquarters at Pearl Harbor and laid groundwork for Polaris Operations in the Pacific. One of the most difficult tasks was establishing and executing the vast training program required for the Blue and Gold crews of each submarine. To meet this requirement, close cooperation with the officers in charge of various schools throughout the nation and Commanding Officers and crewmen of the submarines was necessary.

On 23 April 1964, USS Daniel Boone (SSBN 629) was commissioned at Mare Island Naval Shipyard, California. She then became the squadron flagship and the first fleet ballistic missile submarine assigned to the Pacific Fleet. In the early dawn of 27 May 1964, Daniel Boone surfaced off Diamond Head, Hawaii, after completing a submerged transit from the mainland, and steamed into Pearl Harbor, where she became the first Polaris submarine ever to enter the port. Tecumseh, Ulysses S. Grant, and Stonewall Jackson were then commissioned in rapid sequence. Meanwhile, the squadron scheduled shakedown operations, type training and made ready for the first Polaris Patrol in the Pacific scheduled to commence in early 1965.

In October 1964, the permanent assignment of Commander Submarine Squadron Fifteen was changed from Pearl Harbor to Guam. A rear-echelon staff known as Commander Submarine Squadron Fifteen Representative was established in Pearl Harbor to handle the myriad of personnel and training functions connected with keeping the Polaris submarines crewed with the best-qualified and trained personnel possible.

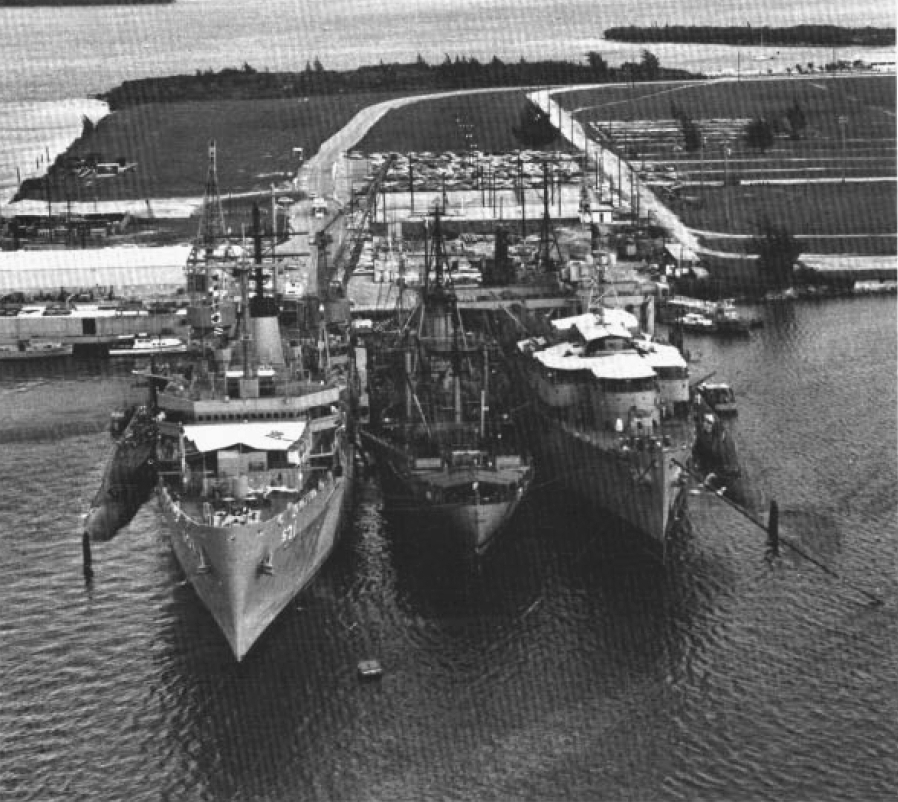
From left to right, USS Kamehameha, USS Hunley, USNS Furman, USS Proteus, and USS Stonewall Jackson at Polaris Point, Naval Base Guam, circa 1968

On the morning of 29 November 1964, Proteus entered Apra Harbor, where she commenced setting up the third FBM replenishment site to support Polaris submarines. Subsequently, seven fleet ballistic missile submarines joined USS Proteus in Guam. Benjamin Franklin and Kamehameha arrived in 1966. Mariano G. Vallejo was commissioned and assigned to Submarine Squadron Fifteen in December 1966.

The year 1970 represented a significant period in the history of the squadron. During this period, the units of the 627/640 class completed Pacific service and departed for conversion to the Poseidon Weapons System, while 616 class overhaul units reported for duty as replacements in the Pacific Fleet strategic deterrent force.

On the morning of 14 October 1971, the submarine tender USS Hunley entered Apra Harbor, Guam and immediately upon mooring at Polaris Point, set about the complex chore of relieving Proteus. On 2 November 1971, Proteus departed Guam en route to the U.S. Naval Shipyard, Mare Island, California, for an extensive shipyard overhaul.

During 1972 Hunley served as Site III support tender and flagship for Commander, Submarine Squadron Fifteen. During the summer months of 1972, Hunley conducted refit work on numerous SSNs in addition to SSBNs normally assigned. This additional workload was in direct support of an increased national readiness condition.

In January 1973, Proteus returned to Guam and relieved Hunley, which departed Guam for conversion at Puget Sound Naval Shipyard, Bremerton, Washington. The return of Proteus to Guam marked the end of the first significant time period that Proteus had been absent from Guam since establishing SSBN REFIT Site III in 1964.

The replacement of 616-class SSBNs with 598/608-class SSBNs commenced in May 1973 when Nathan Hale departed for conversion to the Poseidon Weapons System, and was relieved by George Washington. Later in 1973 Patrick Henry and Robert E. Lee replaced Woodrow Wilson and John Adams. The following units were assigned to the squadron: Proteus (flagship), George Washington, Patrick Henry, Robert E. Lee, Henry Clay, Daniel Webster, Nathan Hale, Abraham Lincoln, Thomas A. Edison and Ethan Allen.

During 1974, replacement of 616-class SSBNs was completed with the 598/608 class. The departure of James Monroe, Daniel Webster, Henry Clay, and the arrival of Theodore Roosevelt resulted in the following units assigned to the squadron: Proteus (flagship), George Washington, Patrick Henry, Theodore Roosevelt, Robert E. Lee, Abraham Lincoln, Ethan Allen, Sam Houston, Thomas A. Edison, John Marshall and Thomas Jefferson.

From 25 December 1964 when Daniel Boone departed Guam on the first Polaris deterrent patrol in the Pacific until October 1981 when Robert E. Lee returned to Pearl Harbor from the last Polaris deterrent patrol, 23 different SSBNs completed 398 Polaris deterrent patrols in the Pacific in support of the United States strategic defense. On 30 September 1981, Submarine Squadron Fifteen ended its eighteen-year existence when it was disestablished in ceremonies on board Proteus in Apra Harbor, Guam.

== Reactivation 2001 ==
In a reactivation ceremony on board USS Frank Cable on 23 February 2001, Captain Jose R. Corpus, USN, became commander of Submarine Squadron Fifteen, formerly commander of Submarine Group Seven Representative Guam. On this day, Submarine Squadron Fifteen became an operational command, providing administrative, logistics and intelligence support for submarines and submarine support ships assigned to Seventh and Fifth Fleets in response to Naval and JCS tasking.

During 2002, the staff of Submarine Squadron Fifteen provided oversight and quality-assurance monitoring during maintenance performed by the assigned tender on three forward deployed submarines prior to their emergent deployments to the Gulf region during Operations Enduring Freedom and Noble Eagle. Submarine Squadron Fifteen was also actively involved in the force protection decisions and efforts of the Naval Station on board COMNAVMARIANAS immediately following the 11 September 2001 attacks.

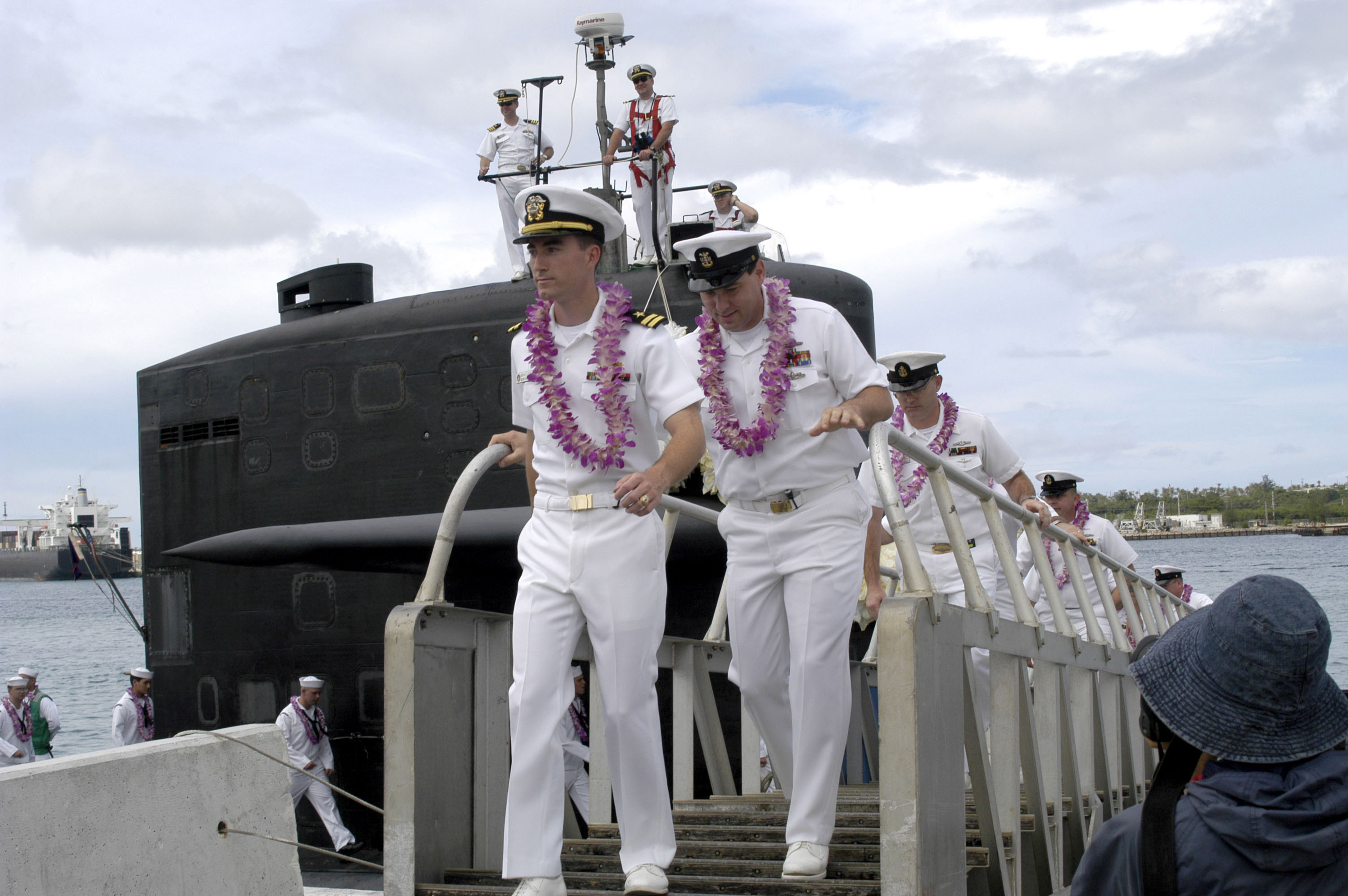
Sailors about USS City of Corpus Christi step ashore at their new Naval Base Guam homeport, 2002

On 17 October and 18 December 2002, respectively, USS City of Corpus Christi and USS San Francisco arrived in Guam, completing their 14,000 nautical miles (25,928 km) inter-fleet transfer that started at Portsmouth Naval Shipyard in Kittery, Maine.

They were the Navy's first forward-deployed and home-ported submarines. City of Corpus Christi, then commanded by CDR Robert Schmidt, was the eighteenth Los Angeles-class fast attack submarine; San Francisco, then commanded by CDR Paul Povlock, was the twenty-fourth Los Angeles-class.

On 5 July 2002, Typhoon Chataan struck Guam, with sustained winds of 115 mph (185 km/h) and gusts to 145 mph (233 km/h), causing substantial property damage. Submarine Squadron Fifteen personnel, assisted by sailors from Frank Cable, participated in post-typhoon recovery actions.

On 8 December 2002 Super-typhoon Pongsona struck Guam for a period of over 12 hours, with destructive winds in excess of 200 knots (370 km/h). The President of the United States declared Guam a disaster area shortly after the storm passed. This storm, one of the two largest to ever strike Guam, significantly impacted the island's infrastructure and damaged both civilian and military facilities. A major fire at the island's gasoline storage facility delayed the recovery effort by limiting the availability of fuel for vehicles and emergency generators. Structures throughout the island, including homes, hospitals, businesses, governmental and military facilities, airports, and harbors were damaged or destroyed. Loss of life was minimized and basic services were rapidly restored due to the timely, aggressive and selfless effort of military personnel assigned to units of Submarine Squadron Fifteen. Frank Cable steamed at Polaris Point for two weeks while supporting the home-ported submarines.

Submarine Squadron Fifteen, Frank Cable, and both assigned submarines received the Humanitarian Service Medal for their service following Typhoon Chataan and Super-typhoon Pongsona.

On 23 December 2003 City of Corpus Christi completed the first-ever mission deployment in support of Commander Seventh Fleet operations by a forward based attack submarine home-ported in Guam.

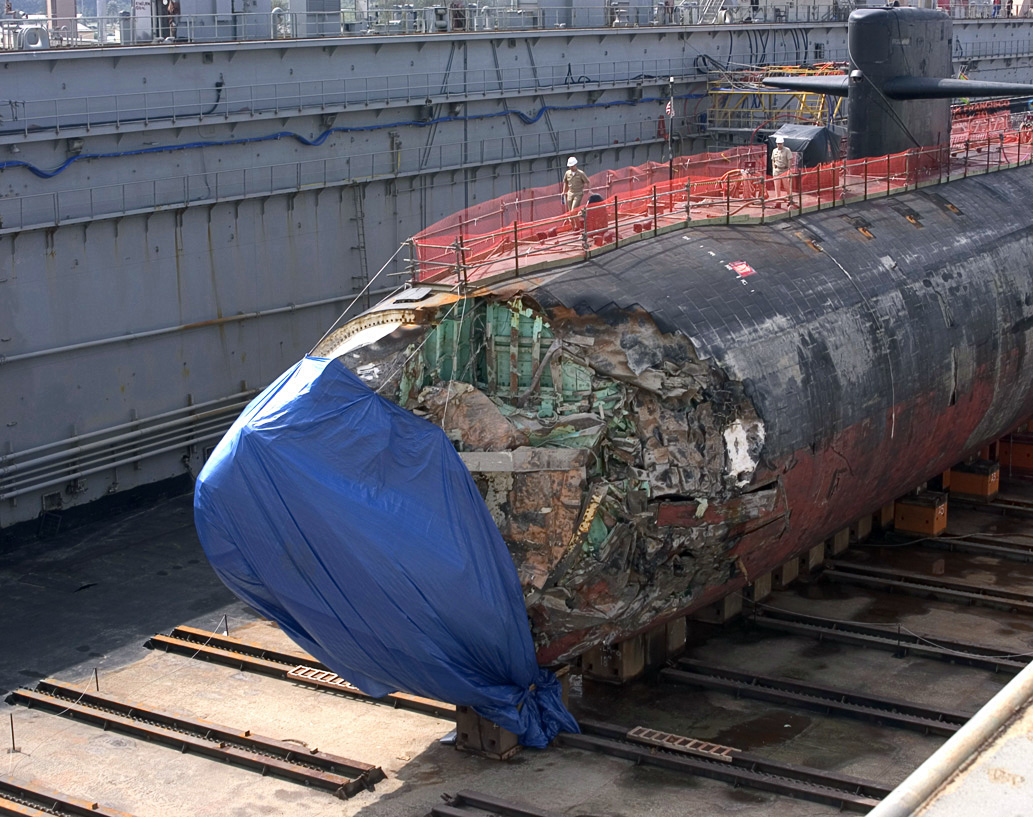
USS San Francisco in drydock on Guam after running into a seamount in 2005

On 8 January 2005 at 02:43 GMT, San Francisco struck an undersea mountain about 364 nautical miles (675 km) southeast of Guam while operating at flank (maximum) speed and more than 500 feet (152 m) deep. The collision was so serious that the vessel was almost lost; accounts detail a desperate struggle for positive buoyancy to surface after the forward ballast tanks were ruptured. Twenty-three crewmen were injured, and one crew member died of his injuries on 9 January. Other injuries to the crew included broken bones, lacerations, and a back injury. San Francisco's forward ballast tanks and her sonar dome were severely damaged, but her inner hull was not breached, and there was no damage to her nuclear reactor. She surfaced and, accompanied by USCGC Galveston Island, USNS GYSGT Fred W. Stockham, and USNS Kiska, as well as MH-60S Knighthawks and P-3 Orion maritime patrol aircraft, arrived in Guam on 10 January. The US Navy immediately stated that there was "absolutely no reason to believe that it struck another submarine or vessel." Later, an examination of the submarine in drydock showed unmistakably that the submarine had indeed struck an undersea mountain to which there were only vague references on the charts available to San Francisco.

Due to the damage to San Francisco, USS Houston replaced her. Houston had just arrived at her new command the previous month in December 2004. The third submarine, USS Buffalo, arrived in July 2007.

In early 2011, USS Oklahoma City relieved City of Corpus Christi, kicking off the Guam SSN rotation with Hawaii. USS Chicago relieved Houston in April 2012. The rotation completed in 2013, with USS Key West replacing Buffalo.

The squadron consists of the Los Angeles-class submarines, and has approximately 80 personnel on staff. The squadron also supports every deploying SSN in the Pacific Fleet Area of Operations, as well as the SSGNs USS Ohio and SSGNs USS Michigan, which are home-ported in Bangor, Washington.

== Assignments ==
As of September 2025, the submarines assigned to CSS 15 are:

- Commander, Submarine Squadron 15 (CSS 15):
  - Los Angeles-class submarines:
    - USS Asheville (SSN-758)
    - USS Jefferson City (SSN-759)
    - USS Annapolis (SSN-760)
    - USS Springfield (SSN-761)
  - Virginia-class submarines:
    - USS Minnesota (SSN-783)

== Commanders ==
- CAPT John Russ
- CAPT Scott Minium - March 2012 to July 2014
- CAPT Jeffrey Grimes - July 2014 to June 2016
- CAPT David Schappert - June 2016 to August 2018
- CAPT Tim Poe - August 2018 to July 2020
- CAPT Bret Grabbe - July 2020 to June 2022
- CAPT Carl Trask - June 2022 to June 2024
- CAPT Neil Steinhagen - June 2024 to Present

== See also ==
- History of the United States Navy
