= USS Tecumseh =

Four ships of the United States Navy have borne the name USS Tecumseh, in honor of Tecumseh (ca. 1768–1813), a Shawnee Indian chief.

- USS Tecumseh (1863), was a Canonicus-class monitor, commissioned on 19 April 1864. It was lost with almost all hands on 5 August, at the Battle of Mobile Bay.
- USS Tecumseh (YT-24), was a tugboat, originally named Edward Luckenbach, purchased by the Navy in 1898 and renamed. She served off and on until she was struck from the Navy list ca. 1945.
- USS Tecumseh (YT-273), was a Pessacus-class tugboat, commissioned in 1943 and struck in 1975.
- USS Tecumseh (SSBN-628), was a James Madison-class ballistic missile submarine, commissioned in 1964 and struck in 1993.
