= USS William C. Lawe (DD-763) =

Gearing-class destroyer

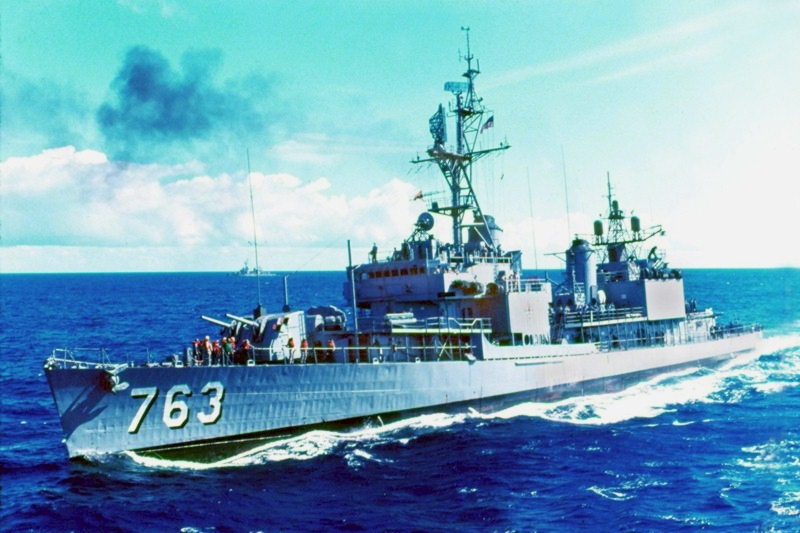
- USS William C. Lawe (DD-763) in 1967

History

United States
- Name: USS William C. Lawe
- Namesake: William C. Lawe
- Builder: Bethlehem Steel Co., San Francisco, California
- Laid down: 12 March 1944
- Launched: 21 May 1945
- Commissioned: 18 December 1946
- Modernized: 11 November 1961 (FRAM IB)
- Decommissioned: 1 October 1983
- Stricken: 1 October 1983
- Identification: Callsign: NTSA; Hull number: DD-763
- Honors and awards: 2 battle stars (Vietnam)
- Fate: Sunk as a target, 14 July 1999

General characteristics
- Class & type: Gearing-class destroyer
- Displacement: 3,460 long tons (3,516 t) full
- Length: 390 ft 6 in (119.02 m)
- Beam: 40 ft 10 in (12.45 m)
- Draft: 14 ft 4 in (4.37 m)
- Propulsion: Geared turbines, 2 shafts, 60,000 shp (45 MW)
- Speed: 35 knots (65 km/h; 40 mph)
- Range: 4,500 nmi (8,300 km) at 20 kn (37 km/h; 23 mph)
- Complement: 336
- Armament: 6 × 5"/38 caliber guns; 16 × 40 mm AA guns; 11 × 20 mm AA guns; 10 × 21-inch (533 mm) torpedo tubes; 6 × depth charge projectors; 2 × depth charge tracks

The third USS William C. Lawe (DD-763) was a Gearing-class destroyer of the United States Navy.

== Namesake ==
William Clare Lawe was born on 26 January 1910 in Carson City, Michigan. He enlisted in the Navy on 27 April 1928, in Detroit, and attained the rate of aviation metalsmith third class (AM3c). He was assigned to a part of Torpedo Squadron 8 (VT-8) which was reequipping with the new Grumman TBF Avenger torpedo bomber. This detachment from VT-8 temporarily left carrier USS Hornet to train on the TBF Avengers. They eventually arrived at Luke Field, Hawaii, for final training prior to rejoining their squadron mates on the Hornet.

Lawe volunteered to participate in a six plane detachment flight to Midway Atoll commanded by Lieutenant Langdon K. Fieberling. He flew as gunner in the Avenger flown by Ensign Charles E. Brannon, USNR. After arriving at Midway on 1 June 1942, the detachment spent the next few days in readiness until departing to attack the Imperial Japanese Navy fleet on 4 June at 06:00. Attacked by Japanese Mitsubishi A6M Zero fighters within minutes of their departure, the Avengers briefly evaded their pursuers and climbed to 4,000 feet (1,200 m). At 07:00, once the airmen sighted the Japanese fleet they dove to 150 feet (46 m). The six Avengers approached the Japanese carriers from astern, but were again met by Zeroes. One aircraft that had been badly damaged aimed its torpedo toward a light cruiser, before limping back to Midway. The five other aircraft including Ens. Brannon's with AM3c Lawe on board were shot down. He was posthumously awarded the Distinguished Flying Cross and Purple Heart.

== Construction and commissioning ==
William C. Lawe (DD-763) was laid down on 12 March 1944 by the Bethlehem Steel Co., San Francisco, California; launched on 21 May 1945; sponsored by Mrs. Nancy Lee Lawe; and commissioned on 18 December 1946.

== 1940s ==
After commissioning, William C. Lawe requested an extended fitting-out period due to the failure of the starboard reduction gear. On 29 January 1947, the ship returned to the Bethlehem Steel Co. for repairs. Lawe reported to San Diego, California for shakedown on 28 March 1947 and continued operations in the San Diego and San Francisco areas until 9 October when she set course for Pearl Harbor, Hawaii. The destroyer remained at Pearl Harbor for three months. She then departed on 16 January 1948, together with three other destroyers and aircraft carrier Valley Forge, for an around-the-world cruise for training and goodwill purposes. The ship returned to San Diego on 12 June 1948 after a five-month cruise in which the ship had steamed over 46,000 nautical miles (85,000 km).

For the next 18 months, William C. Lawe conducted local operations in the San Diego area with periods of upkeep and repair at San Francisco. In October 1949, the destroyer received word of assignment to the Atlantic Fleet and, on 5 October, proceeded to her new home port at Newport, Rhode Island, via the Panama Canal. During the same month, she left Newport to join in Second Task Fleet cold weather operations in the Arctic region. Lawe returned to Newport, Rhode Island, on 21 November 1949 and remained at her new home port for the remainder of the year.

== 1950s ==
During January 1950, William C. Lawe operated with Wright in antisubmarine exercises off Bermuda; and, during the following month, the destroyer took part in Exercise "Portrex" off Puerto Rico and Vieques Island in the Caribbean. This exercise was cut short when Lawe received orders to proceed to Norfolk, Virginia, and escort President Harry S. Truman, on board his yacht, USS Williamsburg, to Key West, Florida, arriving there on 16 March. The destroyer returned to Newport on 6 April and occupied the following weeks with local operations.

In May, the ship spent Armed Forces Day in Savannah, Georgia; and, in August, the destroyer went north to Rockland, Maine, to participate in the Maine Lobster Festival. For the remainder of the year, William C. Lawe operated out of Newport, Rhode Island, with frequent runs to Norfolk, Virginia

On 8 January 1951, William C. Lawe set sail for the Mediterranean and a 6th Fleet deployment. During the next several months, she visited ports in France, Italy, Greece, and Turkey. Upon her return to the United States on 16 May, the destroyer spent the summer months at the Boston Naval Shipyard undergoing overhaul, followed by refresher training at Guantanamo Bay, Cuba. Returning to Newport on 23 October, the ship remained in the local area for the Christmas holidays, then celebrated the New Year at Boston.

William C. Lawe conducted cold weather operations in the Atlantic during the early part of 1952. The exercises were interrupted by a visit to Halifax, Nova Scotia, on 6 February. In the spring, the destroyer spent several weeks in antisubmarine operations in the Caribbean; then, on 3 June, the ship departed Newport and, together with Power, Lawe escorted Oriskany around Cape Horn to the Pacific and up the West Coast of South America. Off Panama, the carrier proceeded alone, and the two destroyers transited the Panama Canal and returned to Newport on 22 July.

On 26 August 1952, William C. Lawe joined in the major NATO Exercise "Mainbrace" which was conducted off Norway and Denmark and took the ship to ports in Scotland, Germany, and England. Upon completion of "Mainbrace", the destroyer spent two weeks operating with units from the British Joint Antisubmarine School at Derry, Northern Ireland. She then returned to her home port on 3 November and remained in port until February 1953.

On 9 February 1953, William C. Lawe, along with five other destroyers and Salerno Bay, headed south for hunter-killer operations in the Caribbean. Continuous operations were interspersed with liberty visits at Trinidad, Puerto Rico, Virgin Islands, Barbados, and the Dominican Republic. Further antisubmarine exercises were conducted off the eastern seaboard throughout the spring of 1953, interrupted by an Armed Forces Day visit to Beaumont, Texas. In June, the ship commenced a three-month overhaul at the Boston Naval Shipyard, followed by refresher training at Guantanamo Bay, Cuba. William C. Lawe returned to Newport from the Caribbean in early December and spent the Christmas holidays in her home port.

January through March 1954 were spent in hunter-killer operations with carrier Mindoro. Maneuvers extended south to the Caribbean and back to Newport, ending in late March. In May, the ship weighed anchor once again for the Mediterranean where, in addition to visiting ports in Italy, Spain, and France, she also conducted amphibious landing exercises with units of the Greek and Turkish armies. William C. Lawe took part in Exercise "Lantflex" in November, then spent the holiday season at Newport.

The destroyer began the year 1955 with another hunter-killer operation in the Caribbean, this time with carrier Valley Forge. After visiting Puerto Rico and Jamaica, she returned to Newport, Rhode Island, in early April. William C. Lawe conducted two midshipmen cruises and then proceeded to Boston in August for a routine shipyard overhaul. One of the Midshipmen was the son of William Lawe who would retire from the Marine Corps in 1978. She returned to Newport, Rhode Island, in November for local operations which lasted to the close of the year.

William C. Lawe rang in the new year, 1956, with refresher training at Guantanamo Bay, Cuba, then visited New Orleans, Louisiana, for the Mardi Gras celebration. March and April were spent in antiair warfare exercises off the East Coast. The destroyer sailed for the Mediterranean on 1 May and spent a month in the eastern Mediterranean visiting ports in Greece, Lebanon, and Turkey. In mid-June, she headed west and made stops at Italy, France, Spain, Sardinia, and Gibraltar. Lawe returned to Newport, Rhode Island, on 25 August 1956 and conducted East Coast operations until mid-December when she berthed at New London, Connecticut, for the holidays,

In January 1957, the destroyer returned to Newport for a tender availability; and, on the 28th of that month, William C. Lawe pulled up anchor and proceeded to the Mediterranean for a five-month tour of duty. She visited ports in Greece, Sicily, Italy, and France. The ship returned to her home port for May and June, then spent eight weeks on a midshipmen cruise. William C. Lawe spent the remainder of 1957 at the Boston Naval Shipyard undergoing overhaul.

During the first half of 1958, the destroyer completed refresher training at Guantanamo Bay, then joined in antisubmarine warfare exercises in the North Atlantic. In early July, a crisis in the Middle East sent William C. Lawe to rendezvous with the 2nd Fleet. She travelled as far as the Azores before returning to the United States on 8 August. The remainder of the summer was spent preparing for a Mediterranean cruise. William C. Lawe got underway on 2 September for the western Mediterranean where she remained for the next several months. The crew enjoyed Christmas and New Year's celebrations on the French Riviera at Cannes, France.

Returning to the United States on 12 March 1959, the ship tied up alongside a destroyer tender for upkeep and repairs. In June, William C. Lawe's home port was changed to Mayport, Florida, where the ship remained in local operations throughout the year.

== 1960s ==
The first quarter of 1960 was a busy period for the destroyer. William C. Lawe served as a rescue destroyer for aircraft carrier operations, a training ship for midshipmen on their annual summer cruise, a school ship for the Fleet Sonar School, and a search and rescue destroyer along the flight route of the President of the United States during his trip to the 1960 summit conference in Europe.

She returned to Mayport, Florida, in September and commenced preparations for a material inspection prior to Mark I FRAM (Fleet Rehabilitation and Modernization) overhaul. On 12 November, William C. Lawe departed Mayport for Charleston Naval Shipyard, to commence preparations for FRAM conversion. On 5 December 1960, Lawe changed status to "In Commission In Reserve" and began FRAM overhaul.

Eleven months later, the destroyer resumed an "In Commission" status; and, on 11 November 1961, she departed Charleston Naval Shipyard for Mayport, Florida. On 4 December, she departed for Guantanamo Bay, followed by a rest period through the remainder of the year.

On 1 January 1962, the ship became a member of Destroyer Squadron 16 (Desron 16), also homeported at Mayport, Florida in early March, William C. Lawe deployed to the Mediterranean where she participated in numerous NATO and 6th Fleet operations. On 2 October 1962, the destroyer returned to Mayport for an anticipated "at home" period after almost seven months at sea. However, the Cuban Missile Crisis intervened; and, on 22 October, the ship headed for the Caribbean, returning to her home port on 6 December. Minor repairs were made in Rawls Bros. Shipyard, Jacksonville, Florida.

The destroyer completed sea trials during February 1963; and, for the next several months, William C. Lawe served as a school ship for the Fleet Sonar School and as a rescue destroyer along the flight route of the President of the United States during his trip to the 1963 Pan-American conference in Puerto Rico. Lawe then deployed to the Mediterranean on 11 August and returned to Mayport on 23 December 1963.

The new year, 1964, began with leave and upkeep. In late February, the destroyer departed for the Caribbean to participate in the annual Operation "Springboard." William C. Lawe then proceeded to Annapolis, Maryland, where she embarked midshipmen for a cruise to northern European ports. The ship returned to Mayport, Florida, on 25 July for a scheduled leave and upkeep period.

From 13 to 24 September, William C. Lawe joined the Royal Canadian Navy in a joint antisubmarine exercise, "Canus-Slamex." She then steamed for the month of October with her destroyer squadron as a member of the "Gold Group" in accordance with the new "Blue and Gold" concept for operational readiness. The destroyer returned to Mayport, Florida, in November for inspection and upkeep. On 1 December, Lawe moored at Charleston, South Carolina, for a regular three-month overhaul.

The yard period was completed on 1 April 1965, and the ship commenced refresher training on 25 April at Guantanamo Bay, Cuba. The crisis in the Dominican Republic interrupted this training; and, from 28 April to 8 May, the destroyer supported United States operations in that area.

William C. Lawe returned to Mayport on 25 June. The month of July was spent in upkeep; and, after "Blue-Gold" operations, the ship once again got underway on 26 August for the Dominican Republic where she served as flagship for Task Force 124 (TF 124). The destroyer departed for Mayport on 17 September and underwent a two-week tender availability before sailing for the Mediterranean on 14 October. The end of November found Lawe in the Middle East, and she spent the Christmas holidays at Mombasa, Kenya. She departed Kenya on 29 December for Djibouti, French Somaliland, and celebrated the arrival of the new year, 1966, at sea in the Indian Ocean.

William C. Lawe operated in the Middle East until 29 January 1966 when she rejoined the 6th Fleet. The ship arrived at Mayport, Florida, on 9 March and commenced leave and upkeep. May and June were spent in support of Gemini IX and X. For the next several months, the destroyer served as a school ship for the Fleet Sonar School at Key West, Florida; joined in "Demolex 1-66" off the coast of North Carolina; and conducted type training exercises. Lawe returned to Mayport on 19 November and remained in port for the remainder of the year.

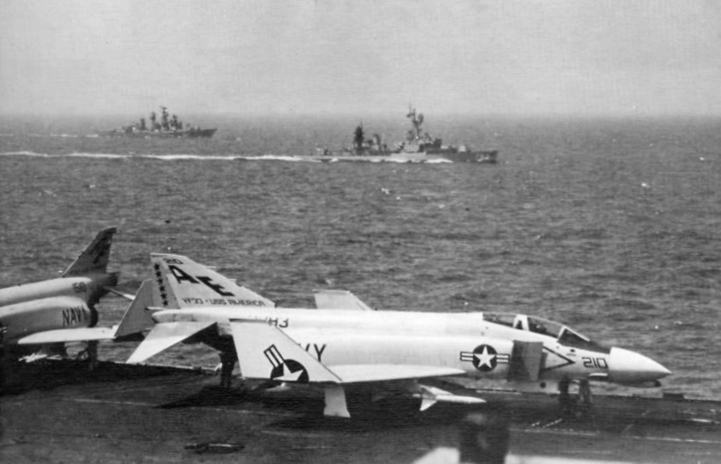
William C. Lawe screening USS America from a Soviet Kashin-class destroyer, 1967

The ship's first 1967 underway period was a three-week "Springboard" operation in the Caribbean during February. Operations with the Bureau of Commercial Fisheries in the Virginia Capes area followed. On 1 May, William C. Lawe deployed to the Mediterranean. While conducting routine exercises at Villefranche-sur-Mer, she received a 24-hour notice to speed to the eastern Mediterranean upon the outbreak of the Arab-Israeli War. She remained in the area for three weeks.

The destroyer remained in the Mediterranean and continued operations until 31 August when she departed for her home port Upon returning to Mayport, the ship spent the remainder of 1967 serving as a sonar school ship at Key West and undergoing various inspections at her home port.

January, February, and March 1968 saw William C. Lawe conducting exercises in the Caribbean with in-port periods at Mayport. Returning to her home port on 28 March, the ship prepared for an upcoming overhaul. After antisubmarine exercises and a two-week trip to Guantanamo Bay, Cuba, during May, Lawe got underway for Charleston, South Carolina, and overhaul.

After a successful sea trial in October, the destroyer returned to Mayport, Florida, on 5 November. At this time, William C. Lawe was placed in "Reduced Operational Status", and she spent the remainder of 1968 in Mayport, Florida

The ship continued in reduced operational status for the first five months of 1969. On 7 July, William C. Lawe left Mayport en route to Newport, Rhode Island, for repairs. She returned to Mayport on 19 July and began preparations for refresher training and inspections in the Caribbean which were completed in early October.

From 7 October to 10 November 1969, the destroyer prepared for deployment to the Middle East. After a refueling stop in Puerto Rico, the ship arrived at Dakar, Senegal, on 22 November. She transited the Cape of Good Hope and arrived at Lourenço Marques, Mozambique, on 11 December. The ship spent Christmas at Mombasa, Kenya, and arrived at Massawa, Ethiopia, on New Year's Day.

== 1970s ==
William C. Lawe continued her Middle East deployment until 16 May 1970 when she returned to Mayport, Florida After a month of leave and upkeep, the destroyer travelled to Panama City, Florida, to test stockpiled ASROCs (antisubmarine rockets). This was followed by a midshipmen cruise and a tender availability until 26 July. The ship conducted antisubmarine exercises and type training in the Virginia Capes area throughout August. From 3 to 25 September, Lawe took part in the surveillance of a Soviet task group in the Caribbean. She returned to Mayport on 26 September and, except for a brief period of plane guard duty with Franklin D. Roosevelt, the destroyer remained in her home port for the remainder of the year.

William C. Lawe began the year 1971 with duty as a support ship for the firing of a Poseidon missile by Von Steuben at Cape Kennedy. Two weeks of "Springboard" operations in the Caribbean followed, and the destroyer returned to Mayport on 25 February for tender availability and restricted availability at the Jacksonville Shipyard.

On 21 April 1971, the destroyer deployed to the Middle East. During the five-month deployment, the ship visited ports in Porto Grande, Cape Verde Islands; Abidjan, Ivory Coast; Luanda, Angola; Mozambique (city), Mozambique; Mombasa, Kenya; Massawa, Ethiopia; Djibouti, French Territory of the Afars and the Issas; Karachi, Pakistan; Cochin, India; Seychelles Island; Diego Garcia; Recife, Brazil; and Port of Spain, Trinidad. Lawe returned to Mayport, Florida, on 20 September. The remaining days of September and most of October were spent in leave and upkeep status.

On 8 November 1971, William C. Lawe put to sea as a member of Destroyer Squadron 16 (DesRon 16), conducting surveillance of four units of the Soviet Navy which were visiting Cuba. The destroyer returned to her home port on 30 November and prepared for an upcoming restricted availability at the Jacksonville Shipyard. On 13 December, the ship began a tender availability with Yosemite which took her through the end of the year.

The new year, 1972, ushered in William C. Lawe's first yard availability of major proportions since 1968; she was assigned restricted overhaul at the Jacksonville Shipyards, Jacksonville, Florida Upon successful completion of dock trials in late March and refresher training at Guantanamo Bay, Cuba, the destroyer performed a surveillance mission in the Caribbean until early June. The ship spent the remainder of the summer in upkeep; involvement in Operation "Pinklace", a NATO exercise; and a destroyer development group antisubmarine exercise.

In early October, William C. Lawe received word of an upcoming Southeast Asian deployment. After a month of preparation, the ship set sail for Pacific waters. On 10 December, William C. Lawe experienced her first combat action in 27 years of service during a daring night raid on North Vietnamese coastal defense sites in which she received hostile return fire. The remainder of 1972 was spent as a gunfire support unit off the coast of South Vietnam.

William C. Lawe rang in 1973 with continued gun-line duty off Vietnam. After an upkeep period at Subic Bay, Philippines, from 14 to 25 January, the ship returned to gunfire support duty until a general cease fire went into effect throughout Vietnam on 28 January 1973. The destroyer continued operations in the area as a planeguard for Enterprise and Coral Sea. She also conducted activities in support of American prisoners-of-war releases, troop withdrawals, and 7th Fleet operations. William C. Lawe left the Gulf of Tonkin on 14 May.

The destroyer arrived at Pearl Harbor, Hawaii, on 28 May, then proceeded to San Diego, California before transiting the Panama Canal. She arrived at Mayport, Florida, on 14 June and, on 20 August, shifted home port to New Orleans. For the remainder of 1973, William C. Lawe participated in various training periods at sea as well as hosting over 1,000 visitors in her new home port.

The ship continued training operations during the early months of 1974. On 23 March, William C. Lawe departed for Charleston, South Carolina, and a tender availability which lasted until 10 May. For the next several months, the destroyer operated in her home port area with exercises held at Port Everglades, Florida, and the Charleston-Jacksonville operations areas. On 15 August 1974, William C. Lawe commenced regular overhaul at Todd and Avondale Shipyards, New Orleans, La.

William C. Lawe completed sea trials on 15 April 1975 and departed for Charleston, South Carolina, on 14 May. She conducted various drills and exercises in and out of port. On 16 June, the destroyer sailed for Freeport, Bahamas, for a two-week active duty training cruise with reservists embarked. A restricted availability at Charleston, South Carolina, followed, and the destroyer returned to New Orleans on 17 August to prepare for an arduous Caribbean deployment.

On 29 August, the ship got underway for Roosevelt Roads, Puerto Rico, the first stop in a series of weapons and gunfire tests. Refresher training was held at Guantanamo Bay, Cuba, prior to returning to New Orleans on 7 October 1975. During a tender availability in Pensacola, Florida, in November, William C. Lawe had pictures of the ship and crew taken by many Navy photographers for use in recruiting posters and advertisements. Returning to New Orleans just prior to Thanksgiving, Lawe moved to the Avondale Shipyard, Avondale, Louisiana, for restricted availability which took her through the remainder of the year.

The destroyer departed for Charleston, South Carolina, on 21 February 1976 where she conducted gunnery exercises in the Jacksonville operating area. The ship got underway on 3 March for Nassau, Bahamas, and a Bicentennial port visit, returning to New Orleans on 17 March. Two months later, the destroyer returned to Mayport, Florida, for four weeks of tender availability prior to a Caribbean deployment.

On 12 June 1976, William C. Lawe got underway for Roosevelt Roads, Puerto Rico, and, after routine exercises, returned to New Orleans, Louisiana, on 30 June via Mayport, Florida. The remainder of 1976 was spent conducting local operations and undergoing routine leave and upkeep. Highlights of the year included operations with the Jeanne d'Arc and Forbin of the French Navy and Bicentennial port visits to Corpus Christi and Brownsville, Texas.

January and February 1977 were spent in New Orleans preparing for upcoming fleet exercises. William C. Lawe joined in Operation "Cleansweep" on 10 March, followed by a visit to Nassau, Bahamas, and tender availability at Pensacola, Florida The ship departed on 8 May and returned to New Orleans after a brief visit to Gulfport, Mississippi.

On 17 June, the destroyer set course for Charleston, South Carolina, where she underwent restricted availability until 21 September when she departed for her home port. Except for a three-day operation with a French destroyer and a French frigate in the Gulf of Mexico, William C. Lawe occupied the month of October with preparation for the second major fleet exercise of the year. "Comptuex 1-78" was held in the Caribbean from 3 to 12 November, followed by a port visit at Nassau, Bahamas. Departing the Bahamas on 19 November, Lawe stopped briefly at Port Everglades, Florida, before returning to New Orleans on 21 November for the holiday season.

The destroyer arrived at Mayport, Florida, on 17 January 1978 for intermediate maintenance availability. The ship returned to New Orleans on 27 March and spent from March through June in restricted availability.

On 21 June, the destroyer, in company with Davis and Robert A. Owens, departed her home port; and, after off-loading ammunition at the Naval Weapons Station, Charleston, South Carolina, she set sail for a cruise of the Great Lakes. During this cruise, over 190,000 visitors toured the three destroyers in both United States and Canadian cities. Port visits included Ogdensburg, Oswego, and Buffalo, New York; Erie, Pennsylvania; Toledo and Ashtabula, Ohio; Detroit, Michigan; Duluth, Minnesota; Montreal, Quebec, Toronto, and Halifax, Canada. William C. Lawe returned to New Orleans on 27 September.

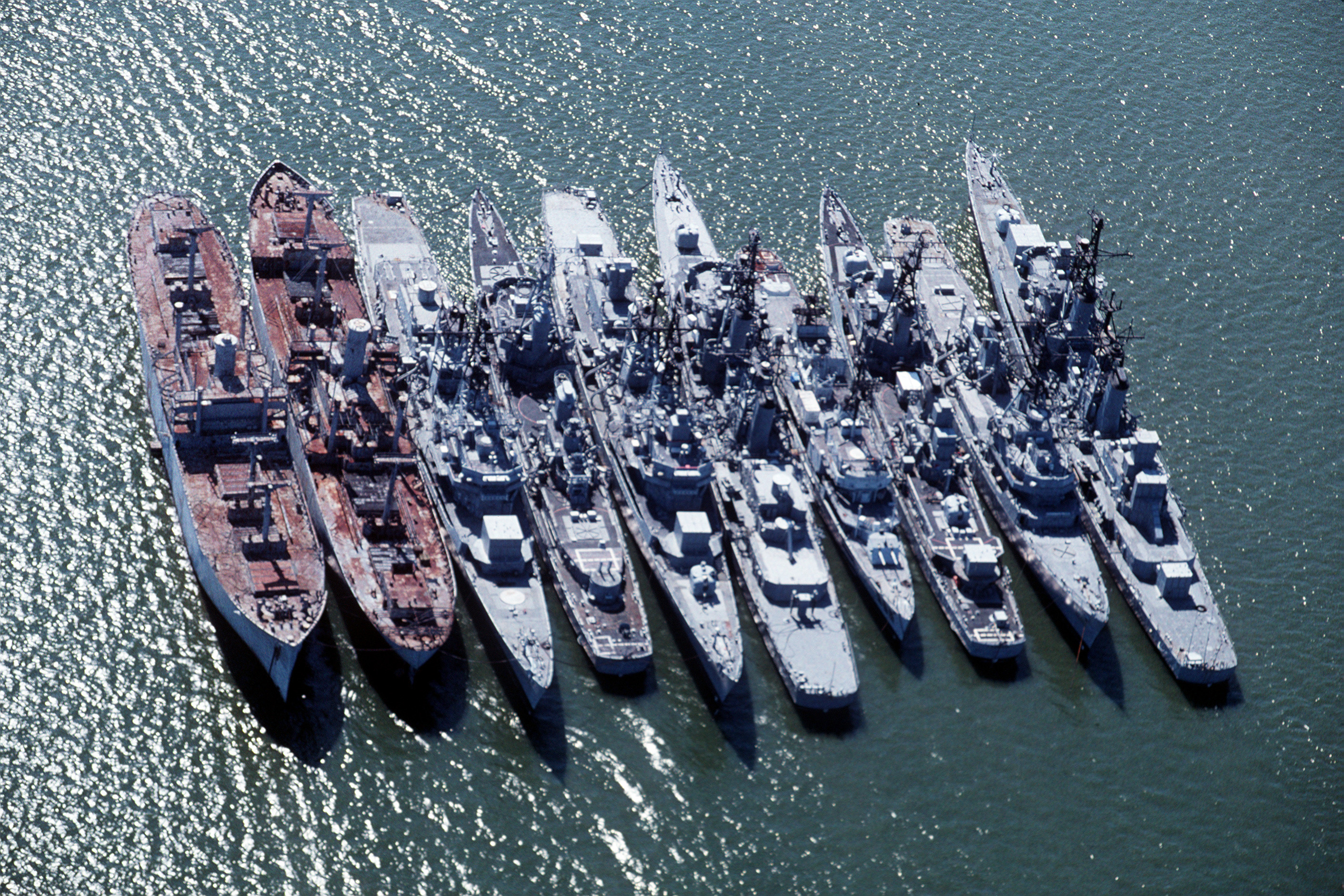
William C. Lawe (fourth from the right) on the James River, in 1993

On 21 October 1978, the destroyer set her course for Mayport, Florida, for a month-long intermediate maintenance availability, then sailed to the Caribbean for gunnery exercises. William C. Lawe returned to New Orleans on 12 December and began preparations for the upcoming Christmas leave period.

A recommendation to strike William C. Lawe from the Navy List was rescinded on 27 July 1979, and the destroyer was retained for additional active service.

On 1 October 1983, William C. Lawe was decommissioned and stricken from the Naval Vessel Register. She was disposed of as a target, effective date 14 July 1999.

== Awards ==
William C. Lawe received two battle stars for her Vietnam War service.
