= USS James Madison =

James Madison-class submarine (1963–1992)

USS James Madison (SSBN-627)
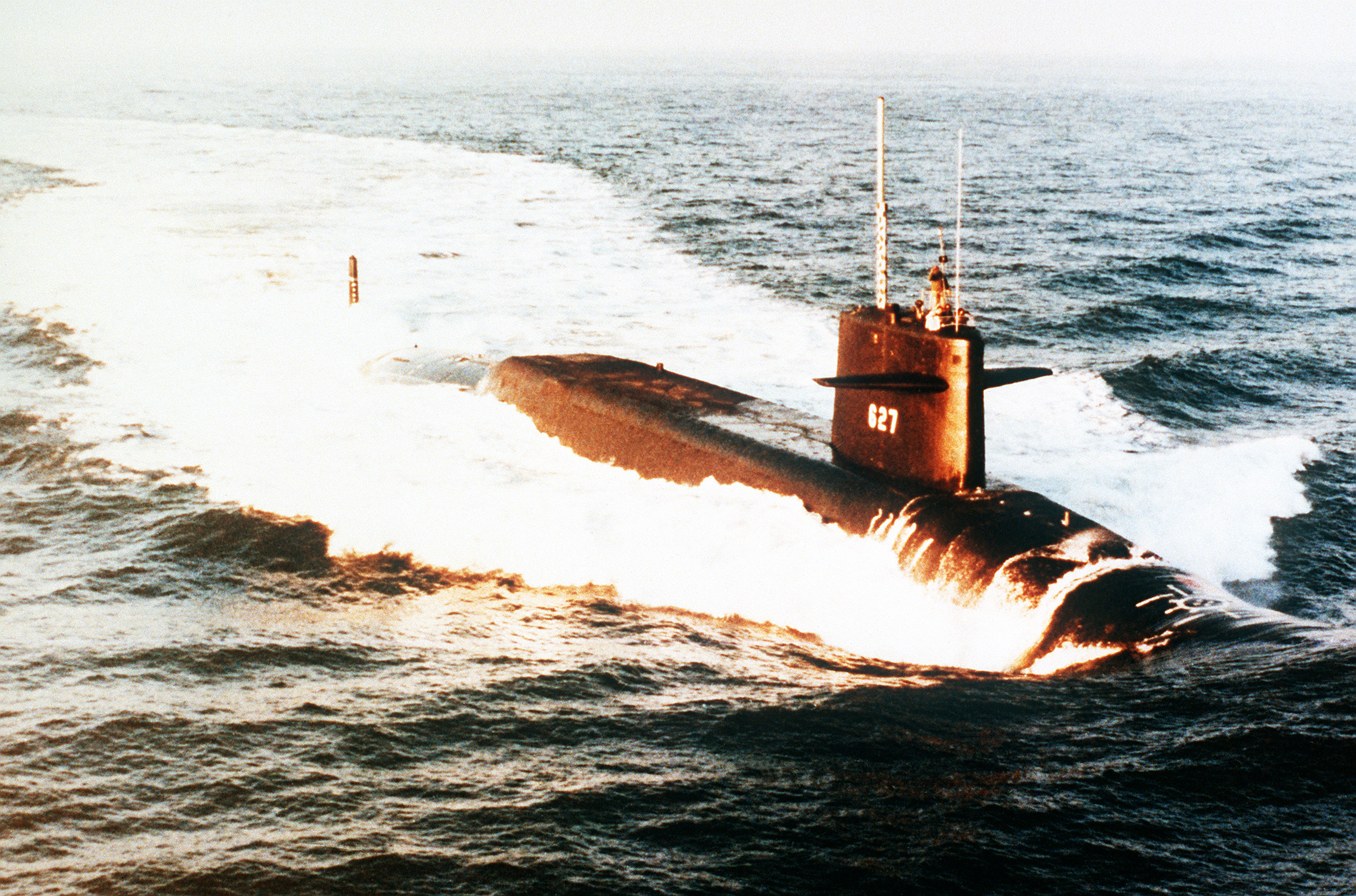
- USS James Madison (SSBN-627) at sea

History

United States
- Name: USS James Madison
- Namesake: James Madison
- Ordered: 20 July 1961
- Builder: Newport News Shipbuilding and Drydock Company
- Laid down: 5 March 1962
- Launched: 15 March 1963
- Sponsored by: Mrs. A. S. "Mike" Monroney
- Commissioned: 28 July 1964
- Decommissioned: 20 November 1992
- Stricken: 20 November 1992
- Fate: Scrapping via Ship-Submarine Recycling Program completed 24 October 1997

General characteristics
- Class & type: James Madison-class submarine fleet ballistic missile submarine (hull design SCB 216 Mod 3)
- Displacement: 7,320 long tons (7,437 t) (submerged); 8,240 long tons (8,372 t) (submerged)
- Length: 425 feet (130 m)
- Beam: 33 feet (10 m)
- Draught: 32 ft (9.8 m)
- Installed power: S5W reactor
- Propulsion: 2 × geared steam turbines 15,000 shp (11,000 kW); 1 shaft, one 7-bladed screw
- Speed: Over 20 knots (37 km/h; 23 mph)
- Test depth: Over 400 ft (120 m)
- Complement: Two crews (Blue and Gold) of 15 officers and 132 enlisted each
- Armament: 4 × 21 inches (530 mm) Mark 65 torpedo tubes (bow; Mark 48 torpedoes, 16 vertical launch missile tubes amidships, various small arms

USS James Madison (SSBN-627), the lead ship of her class of ballistic missile submarine, was the second ship of the United States Navy to be named for Founding Father James Madison (1751–1836), the fourth President of the United States (1809–1817).

== Construction and commissioning ==
The contract to build James Madison was awarded to Newport News Shipbuilding and Dry Dock Company in Newport News, Virginia on 20 July 1961 and her keel was laid down there on 5 March 1962. She was launched on 15 March 1963, sponsored by Mrs. Mary Ellen (Mellon) Monroney, wife of Oklahoma Senator A.S. "Mike" Monroney, and commissioned on 28 July 1964. Prior to her first patrol, she was loaded with sixteen Polaris A-3 ballistic missiles.

== Operational history ==
After post-shakedown repairs and modification in November and December 1964, James Madison departed on her first deterrent patrol on 17 January 1965. By the end of 1966, she had completed her 10th deterrent patrol, serving in the European area.

In November 1974 she was involved in a collision with a Soviet Victor-class submarine K-306. The incident occurred when the James Madison was departing Holy Loch in Argyll, Scotland, to take up station and collided with a Soviet submarine waiting outside the port to trail it. Eric Graham, a marine historian from the University of Edinburgh, told BBC Scotland it could have been a diplomatic incident but because it was so deep into the UK home water it was an "embarrassment" to the Royal Navy that they wanted to keep quiet.

During her first major overhaul, like the rest of her class, Madison was retrofitted with Poseidon C-3 missiles and their associated Mark 88 firecontrol system. Poseidon was replaced by Trident C-4 missiles during a comprehensive overhaul that took place at the Newport News (VA) Shipyard in the early 1980s.

== Decommissioning and disposal ==
The inactivation of James Madison at Mare Island Naval Shipyard at Vallejo, California, began on 18 February 1992. She was decommissioned on 20 November 1992 and struck from the Naval Vessel Register the same day, and her inactivation at Mare Island was completed on 8 December 1992. Her scrapping via the Nuclear-Powered Ship and Submarine Recycling Program in Bremerton, Washington, was completed on 24 October 1997.
