= USS Daniel Boone =

Submarine of the United States

USS Daniel Boone (SSBN-629)
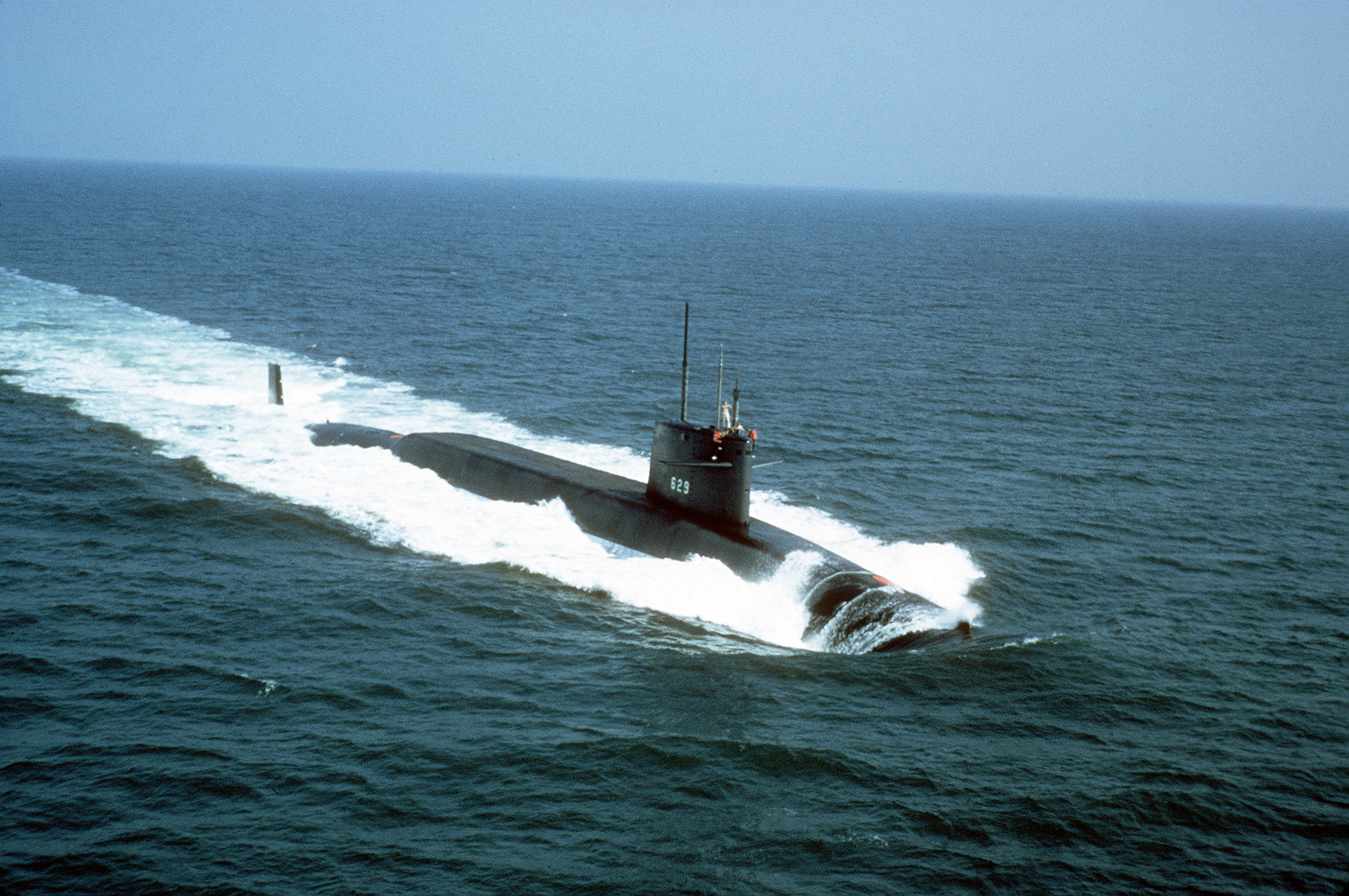
- USS Daniel Boone (SSBN-629) off Hampton Roads, Virginia, on 1 February 1991

History

United States
- Namesake: Daniel Boone (1734–1820), the American explorer and frontiersman.
- Ordered: 21 July 1961
- Builder: Mare Island Naval Shipyard, Vallejo, California
- Laid down: 6 February 1962
- Launched: 22 June 1963
- Sponsored by: Mrs. James H. Wakelin, Jr.
- Commissioned: 23 April 1964
- Decommissioned: 18 February 1994
- Stricken: 18 February 1994
- Motto: New Trails to Blaze
- Fate: Scrapping via Ship-Submarine Recycling Program completed 4 November 1994

General characteristics
- Class & type: James Madison-class submarine (hull design SCB-216 Mod 3)
- Displacement: 7,320 long tons (7,440 t) (submerged); 8,240 long tons (8,370 t) (submerged)
- Length: 425 feet (130 m)
- Beam: 33 feet (10 m)
- Draught: 32 ft (9.8 m)
- Installed power: S5W reactor
- Propulsion: 2 × geared steam turbines 15,000 shp (11,000 kW); 1 × shaft driving one 7-bladed screw
- Speed: Over 20 knots (37 km/h; 23 mph)
- Test depth: Over 400 ft (120 m)
- Complement: Two crews (Blue and Gold), 13 officers and 130 enlisted each
- Armament: 4 × 21 inches (530 mm) Mark 65 torpedo tubes bow; Mark 48 torpedoes; 16 × vertical launch missile tubes amidships, various small arms

USS Daniel Boone (SSBN-629), a James Madison-class nuclear-powered ballistic missile submarine, was the only ship of the United States Navy to be named for Daniel Boone (1734–1820), the pioneer and frontiersman.

== Construction and commissioning ==
The contract to build Daniel Boone was awarded to Mare Island Naval Shipyard at Vallejo, California, on 21 July 1961 and her keel was laid down there on 6 February 1962. She was launched on 22 June 1963 sponsored by Mrs. Margaret Smith Wakelin, wife of Dr. James H. Wakelin, Jr., a physicist who was the Assistant Secretary of the Navy (Research and Development) from 1959 until 1964. Daniel Boone was commissioned on 23 April 1964, with Commander George P. Steele, III, in command of the Blue Crew and Lieutenant Commander Alan B. Crabtree in command of the Gold Crew. Following her commissioning, Daniel Boone was assigned to Submarine Squadron 15, becoming the first ballistic missile submarine assigned to the Pacific Fleet.

== Operational history ==
During her first major overhaul, Daniel Boone was retrofitted with Poseidon C-3 missiles and the associated Mark 88 firecontrol system, as had the rest of her class, . Poseidon was replaced by Trident C-4 missiles and on 6 September 1980, Boone became the first James Madison operational with the new missile.

Daniel Boone entered the Tenneco Shipyard at Newport News, Virginia sometime in late 1985 or early 1986 for refit. During post-refit sea trials on 7 April 1987 she ran aground in the James River at Newport News. This grounding occurred primarily because the OOD (Officer of the Deck), in an attempt to counteract tidal currents, lowered the SPM (Secondary Propulsion Motor) which was quickly and violently snapped off on a sandbar. The OOD then ordered the SPM retracted which, when retracted would have opened up an unpluggable 6" diameter hole in the hull. This potentially catastrophic mistake was countermanded by watchstanders on the scene in the Machinery space. In spite direct orders from the CONN and Maneuvering, the senior watchstander on the scene prevented the SPM from being retracted, preventing the submarine from sinking in the James River. This accident, however, significantly delayed her departure from the refit yards because they had to obtain another SPM and repair the hull penetration in Tenneco Shipyard's dry dock. No ballistic missiles were on board.

== Decommissioning and disposal ==
Daniel Boone was decommissioned on 18 February 1994 and stricken from the Naval Vessel Register the same day. Her scrapping via the Nuclear-Powered Ship and Submarine Recycling Program in Bremerton, Washington, was completed on 4 November 1994.
