= USS Von Steuben (SSBN-632) =

Submarine of the United States

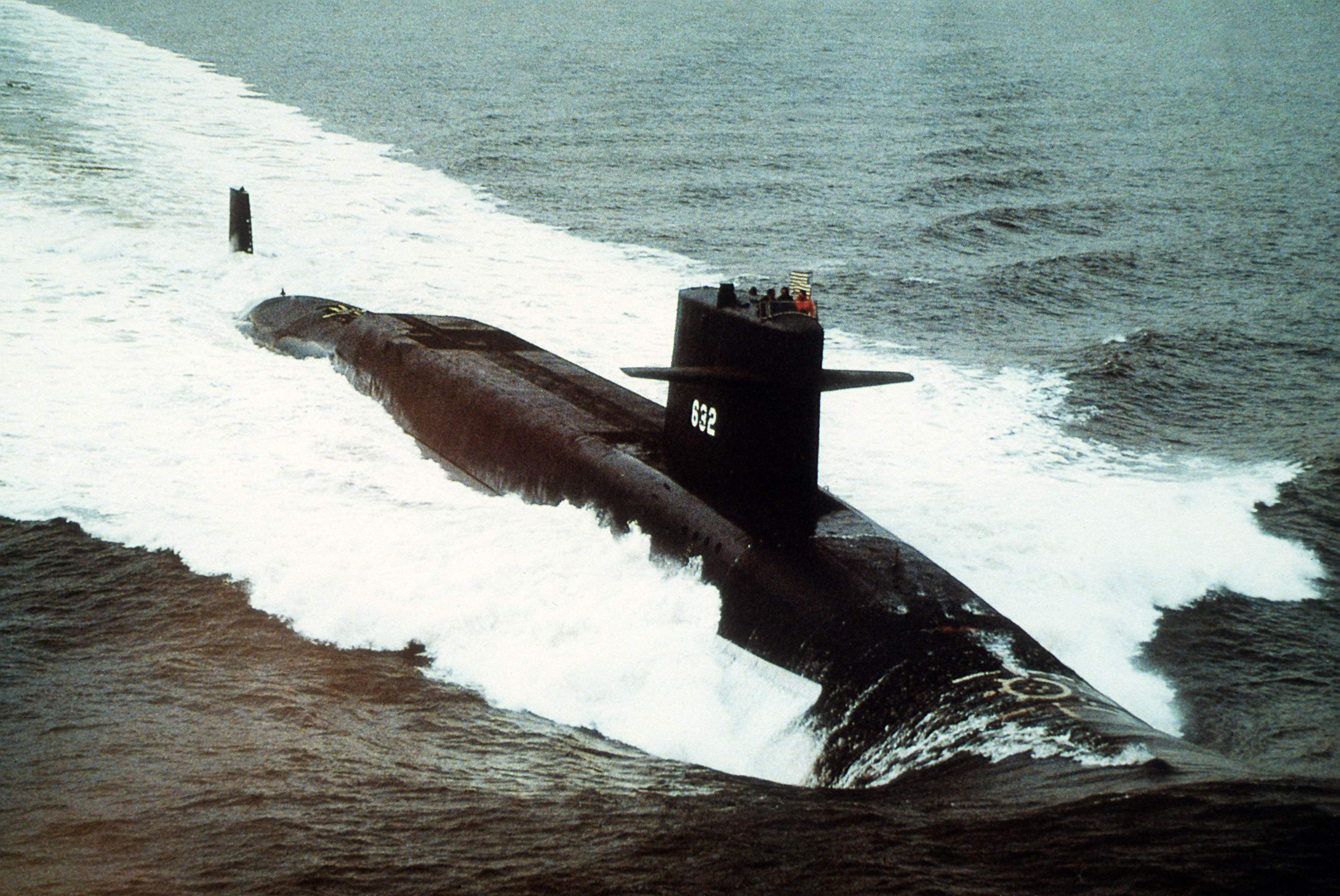
- USS Von Steuben (SSBN-632) on 15 May 1985.

History

United States
- Namesake: Baron Friedrich Wilhelm von Steuben (1730–1794), a Prussian army officer who served in the American Revolutionary War
- Ordered: 20 July 1961
- Builder: Newport News Shipbuilding and Drydock Company
- Laid down: 4 September 1962
- Launched: 18 October 1963
- Sponsored by: Mrs. Fred Korth
- Commissioned: 30 September 1964
- Decommissioned: 26 February 1994
- Stricken: 26 February 1994
- Fate: Scrapping via Nuclear Powered Ship and Submarine Recycling Program begun 1 October 2000, completed 30 October 2001

General characteristics
- Class & type: James Madison-class submarine
- Displacement: 6,504 tons (light); 7,250 tons (surfaced); 8,250 tons (submerged)
- Length: 425 feet (130 m)
- Beam: 33 ft (10 m)
- Draft: 32 ft (9.8 m)
- Installed power: S5W reactor
- Propulsion: 2 × geared steam turbines, 15,000 shp (11,185 kW) 1 shaft
- Speed: Over 20 knots (37 km/h; 23 mph)
- Test depth: 1,300 feet (400 m)
- Complement: Two crews (Blue and Gold) of 13 officers and 130 enlisted men each
- Armament: 16 × ballistic missile tubes; 4 × 21 inches (0.53 m) torpedo tubes

USS Von Steuben (SSBN-632), a James Madison-class fleet ballistic missile submarine, was the second ship of the United States Navy to be named for Baron Friedrich Wilhelm von Steuben (1730–1794), a Prussian army officer who served in the American Revolutionary War.

== Construction and commissioning ==
The contract to build Von Steuben was awarded to Newport News Shipbuilding and Dry Dock Company in Newport News, Virginia, on 20 July 1961 and her keel was laid down there on 4 September 1962. She was launched on 18 October 1963, sponsored by Vera (Connell) Korth, wife of Fred Korth, Secretary of the Navy, and commissioned on 30 September 1964, with Commander John P. Wise in command of the Blue Crew and Commander Jeffrey C. Metzel in command of the Gold Crew.

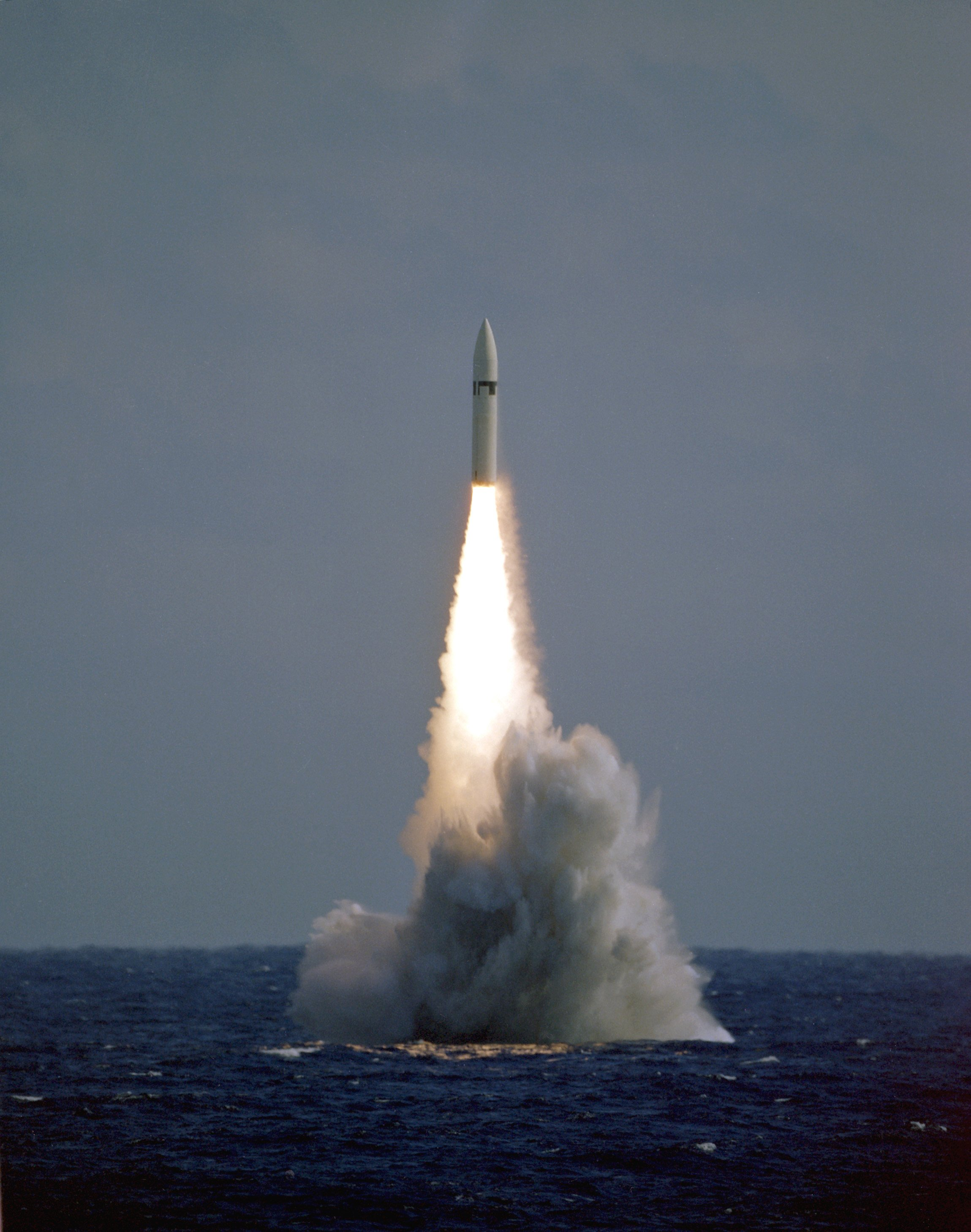
Polaris missile launch

During the autumn of 1964, the Von Steuben completed two shakedown cruises — one for each crew — and a period of antisubmarine warfare training between the two cruises. On 22 December 1964, her Gold Crew fired her first Polaris ballistic missile on the Atlantic Missile Range before returning to Newport News for Christmas. She changed crews again at the beginning of 1965, and returned to the missile range off Cape Canaveral, Florida, where the Blue Crew fired its first Polaris missile. In February 1965, after completing all initial training operations, she returned to Newport News.

In March 1965, Von Steuben headed for her first duty assignment. She joined Submarine Squadron 18 at Charleston, South Carolina, her new base of operations, and immediately began conducting strategic deterrent patrols.

At the end of her 11th deterrent patrol early in 1968, Von Steuben was reassigned to Submarine Squadron 16 and operated out of Rota, Spain, until the middle of 1969.

=== Sealady incident ===
On August 9, 1968, while operating submerged about 40 miles (64 kilometers) off the southern coast of Spain, Von Steuben was struck by a submerged tow cable connecting a tug and a merchant tanker called Sealady (Sealady was a liberty ship previously named Bengt H. Larson (1959) and before that was named Alan Seeger (1954)). Due to the merchant being under tow at the time of the collision, the ship had no engine noise for the submarine to detect its presence. When it became apparent the submarine had lost depth control and steering, but not knowing why, the submarine conducted an emergency main ballast tank blow, which resulted in the collision of the submarine and the towed ship. The submarine suffered external damage to the sail and superstructure. After local repairs at the submarine squadron facilities in Rota, she reported to Groton, Connecticut, for more detailed repairs at the Electric Boat Division of General Dynamics Corporation, after which she resumed deterrent patrols out of Rota.

This incident was revisited, when USS Greeneville, on 9 February 2001, also conducted an emergency main ballast tank blow off the coast of Oahu while hosting several civilians. Greeneville struck the 191-foot (58 m) Japanese fishery high school training ship Ehime Maru (えひめ丸), causing the fishing boat to sink in less than ten minutes with the death of nine crew members, including four high school students. Von Steuben had conducted an emergency main ballast tank blow due to its planes tangled in the submerged towline of the tug, jamming them so that the sub threatened to sink. Greenville blew her main ballast tanks merely to demonstrate a maneuver and not to escape from danger. Her captain consciously surrendered control of the vessel. The captain of Von Steuben had acted properly in ordering the emergency blow. He had lost control of his ship, his stern planes were jammed, and the possibility of an irreversible plunge to the bottom of the ocean was very real. However, Greenville's captain had to face a court of inquiry and possibly a full court-martial, until his request to retire was approved.

== Upgraded ballistic missile system ==
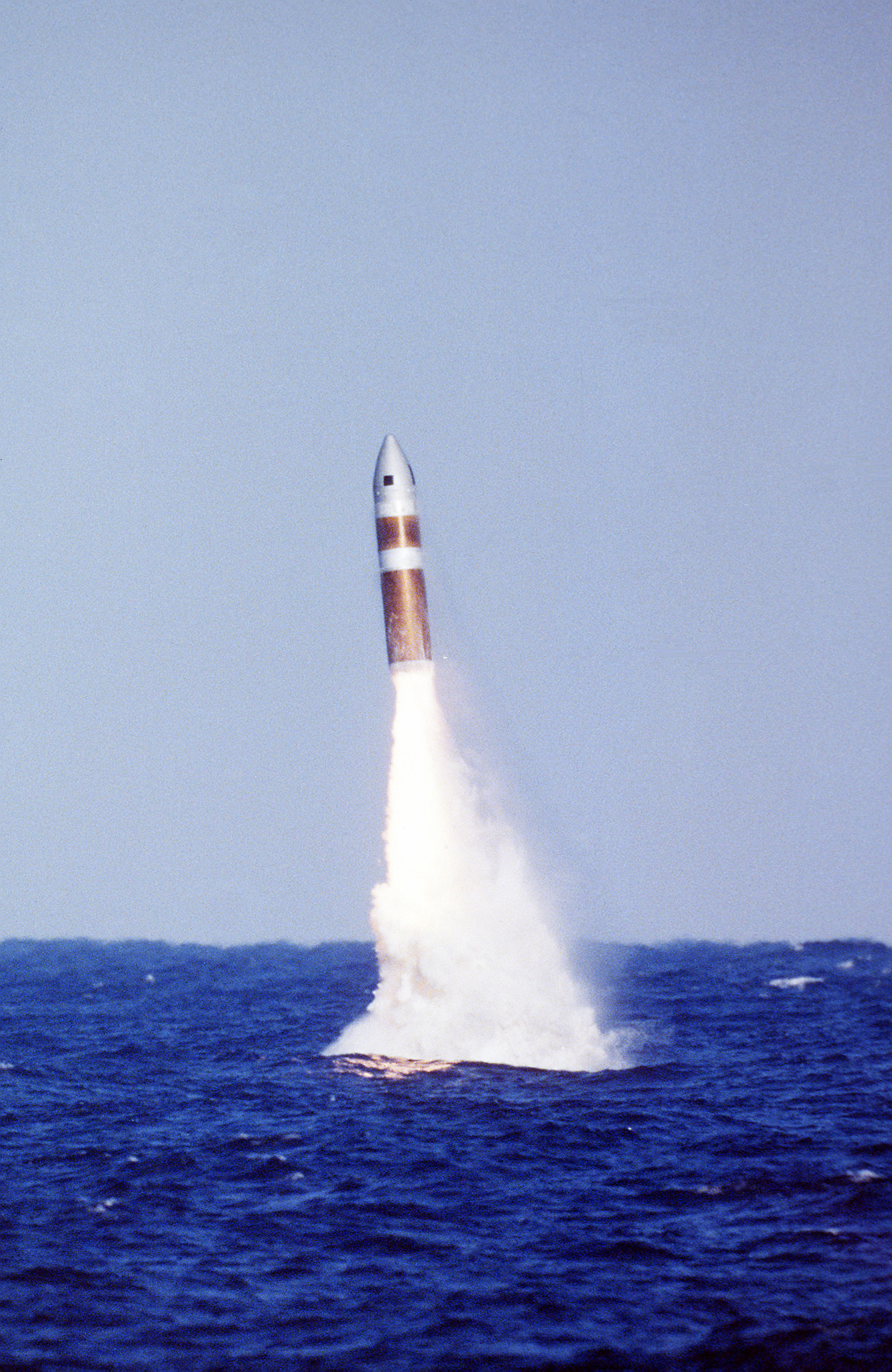
Poseidon missile launch

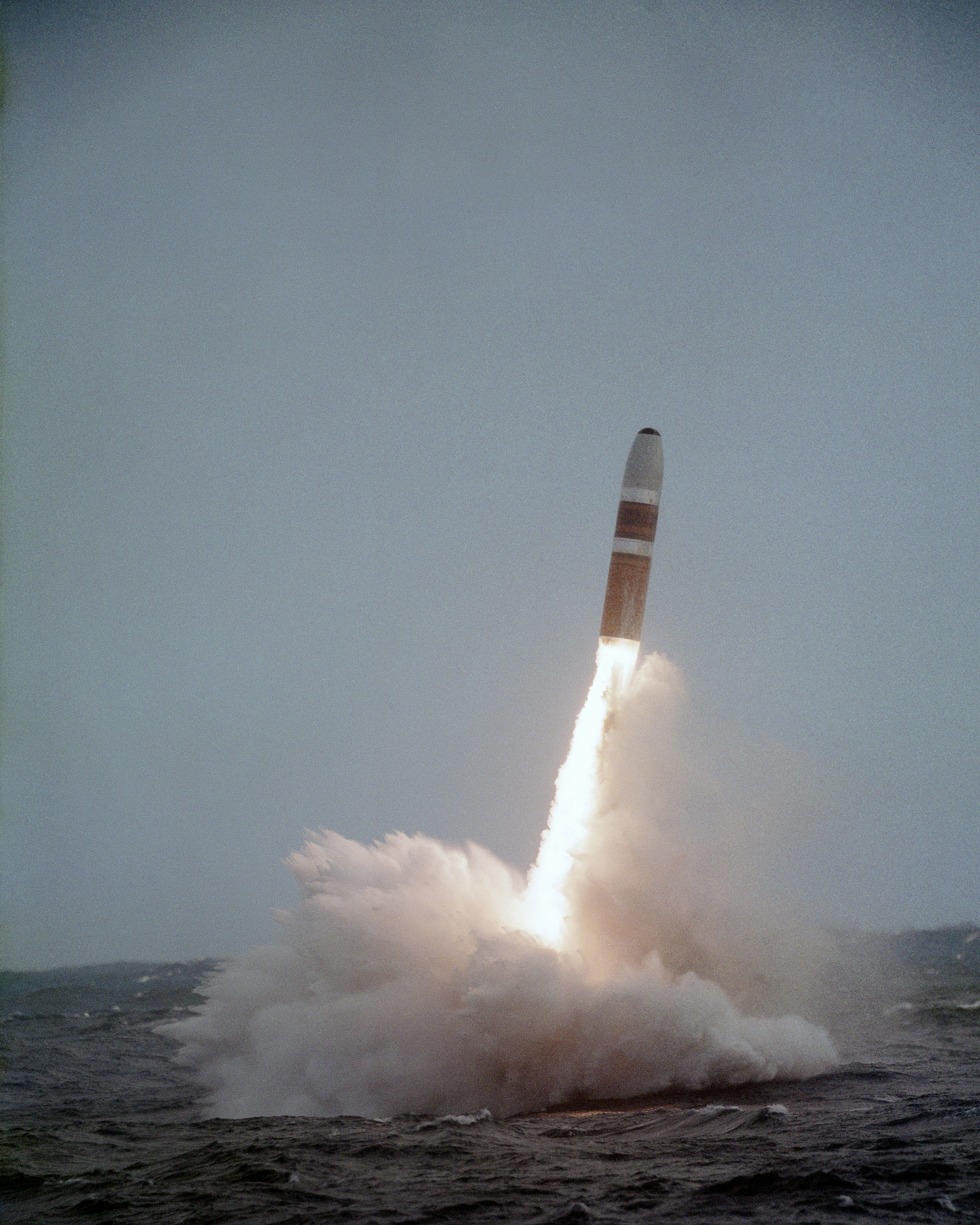
Trident I missile launch

In November 1970, Von Steuben visited Groton once again, this time near the end of a 16-month overhaul during which she was modified to carry the newly developed Poseidon C-3 ballistic missile, which boasted major advances in warhead technology and accuracy and systematically was replacing the older Polaris missiles in the Lafayette, James Madison and Benjamin Franklin-class submarines. Von Steuben conducted post-conversion shakedown during the early months of 1971 and, while escorted by the destroyer USS William C. Lawe (DD-763) for range security, conducted a two-missile Demonstration and Shakedown Operation (DASO) in which she fired her first and second Poseidon missiles in February and March 1971, respectively.

In May 1971, she returned to Charleston and resumed strategic deterrent patrols carrying the newer Poseidon missiles. She conducted an Extended Refit Period at Portsmouth Naval Shipyard between March 1978 and May 1978.

Von Steuben's ballistic missile system was upgraded a second time in the early 1980s to use Trident I (C4) ballistic missiles. These missiles were also retrofitted to 11 other SSBNs of the James Madison and Benjamin Franklin classes, replacing their Poseidon missiles, and also were the first missiles carried by the early Ohio-class submarines. Trident missiles were three-stage missiles that provided for increased range along with advances in inertial guidance systems. Von Steuben continued making strategic deterrent patrols into the early 1990s with the Trident I missile.

== Decommissioning and disposal ==
Von Steuben was decommissioned on 26 February 1994 and stricken from the Naval Vessel Register simultaneously. Her scrapping via the Nuclear-Powered Ship and Submarine Recycling Program at Bremerton, Washington, began on 1 October 2000 and was completed on 30 October 2001. Von Steuben's age from delivery to disposal was 37.2 years.

== See also ==
- 41 for Freedom
- Alan Seeger
- List of Liberty ships (A–F)
