= USS John C. Calhoun =

Submarine of the United States

USS John C. Calhoun (SSBN-630)
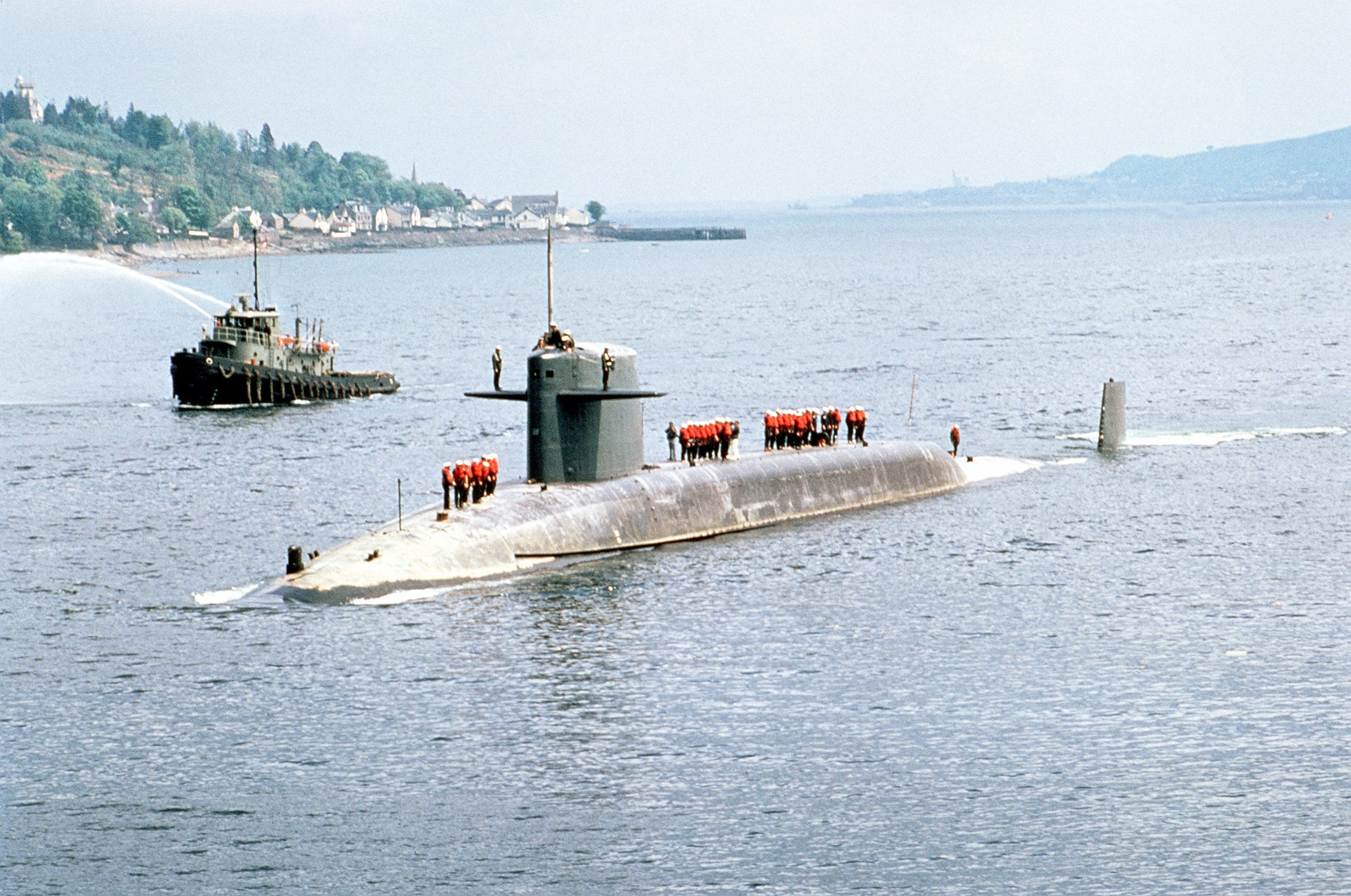
- USS John C. Calhoun (SSBN-630) in 1972

History

United States
- Namesake: John Calhoun, South Carolinian politician
- Ordered: 20 July 1961
- Builder: Newport News Shipbuilding and Dry Dock Co., Newport News, Virginia
- Laid down: 4 June 1962
- Launched: 22 June 1963
- Sponsored by: Miss Rosalie J. Calhoun
- Commissioned: 15 September 1964
- Decommissioned: 28 March 1994
- Stricken: 28 March 1994
- Motto: For Peace, Ready
- Fate: Scrapping via Ship-Submarine Recycling Program completed 18 November 1994

General characteristics
- Class & type: James Madison-class submarine
- Displacement: 7,300 long tons (7,417 t) surfaced; 8,250 long tons (8,382 t) submerged
- Length: 425 ft (130 m)
- Beam: 33 ft (10 m)
- Draft: 32 ft (9.8 m)
- Installed power: S5W reactor
- Propulsion: 2 × geared steam turbines 15,000 shp (11,185 kW), one shaft
- Speed: Over 20 knots (37 km/h; 23 mph)
- Test depth: 1,300 feet (400 m)
- Complement: Two crews (Blue and Gold) of 13 officers and 130 enlisted men each
- Armament: 16 × ballistic missile tubes (originally for Polaris missiles, later for Trident C-4 missiles); 4 × 21 in (533 mm) torpedo tubes (all forward) with Mark 48 torpedoes

USS John C. Calhoun (SSBN-630), a James Madison-class fleet ballistic missile submarine, was the only ship of the United States Navy to be named for John C. Calhoun (1782–1850), the Democratic legislator and statesman.

== Construction and commissioning ==
The contract to build John C. Calhoun was awarded to Newport News Shipbuilding and Dry Dock Company in Newport News, Virginia, on 20 July 1961 and her keel was laid down there on 4 June 1962. She was launched on 22 June 1963 sponsored by Miss Rosalie J. Calhoun, great-great-granddaughter of John C. Calhoun, and commissioned on 15 September 1964, with Commander Deane L. Axene in command of the Blue Crew and Commander Frank A. Thurtell in command of the Gold Crew.

== Operational history ==
After shakedown and training along the United States East Coast, John C. Calhoun began operational deterrent patrols on 22 March 1965, assigned to Submarine Squadron 18.

History from 1965 to 1994 needed.

From 1979 to 1982, John C. Calhoun received upgrades necessary to enable her to carry the new Trident I ballistic missiles.

== Decommissioning and disposal ==
John C. Calhoun was decommissioned on 28 March 1994 at Bremerton, Washington, and stricken from the Naval Vessel Register the same day. Her scrapping via the Nuclear-Powered Ship and Submarine Recycling Program at Bremerton, Washington, was completed on 18 November 1994.
