= James Madison-class submarine =

United States Navy class of fleet ballistic missile submarines

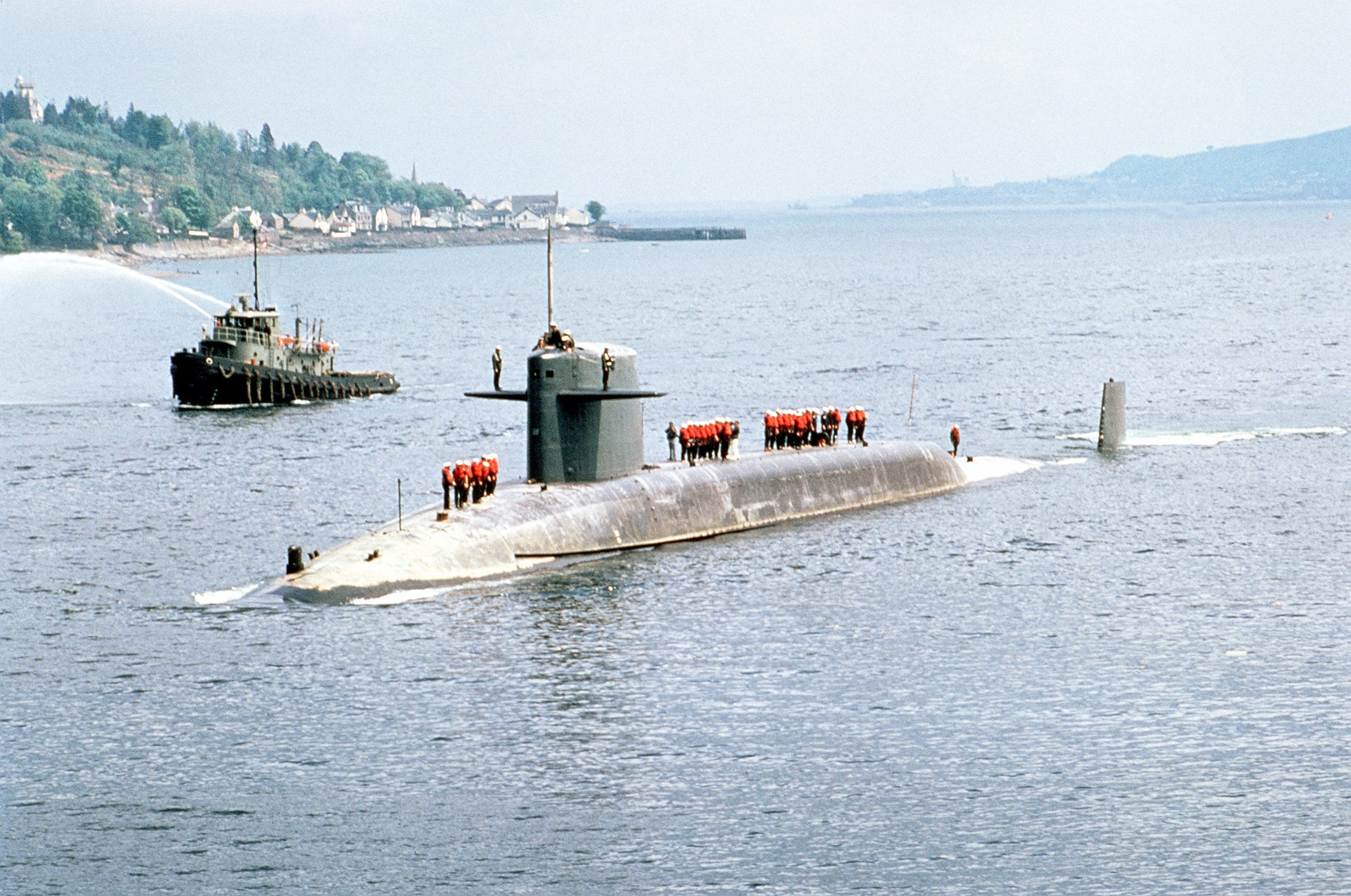
- USS John C. Calhoun (SSBN-630) entering Holy Loch, Scotland on completion of the thousandth Polaris nuclear deterrent patrol, 18 May 1972.

Class overview
- Builders: General Dynamics Electric Boat; Mare Island Naval Shipyard; Portsmouth Naval Shipyard; Newport News Shipbuilding and Drydock Company
- Operators: United States Navy
- Preceded by: Lafayette class
- Succeeded by: Benjamin Franklin class
- Built: 1962–1964
- In commission: 1964–1995
- Completed: 10
- Retired: 10

General characteristics
- Type: Nuclear-powered ballistic missile submarine
- Displacement: Surfaced: 7,325 long tons (7,443 t) Submerged: 8,251 long tons (8,383 t)
- Length: 425 ft (130 m)
- Beam: 33 ft (10 m)
- Draft: 28 ft 6 in (8.69 m)
- Propulsion: 1 × S5W PWR; 2 geared steam turbines (15,000 shp (11,000 kW)), 1 shaft
- Speed: 16 knots (30 km/h) surfaced; 21 knots (39 km/h) submerged
- Test depth: 1,300 feet (400 m)
- Complement: Two crews of 14 officers and 126 enlisted
- Armament: 16 Polaris A3 or Poseidon C3 or Trident I C4 missiles, 4 × 21-inch (533 mm) torpedo tubes, 12 torpedoes

The James Madison class of submarine was an evolutionary development from the Lafayette class of fleet ballistic missile submarine. They were identical to the Lafayettes except for being initially designed to carry the Polaris A-3 missile instead of the earlier A-2. This class, together with the George Washington, Ethan Allen, Lafayette, and Benjamin Franklin classes, composed the "41 for Freedom" that was the Navy's primary contribution to the nuclear deterrent force through the late 1980s. This class and the Benjamin Franklin class are combined with the Lafayettes in some references.

== Design ==
In the early 1970s all were modified for the Poseidon C-3 missile. During the late 1970s and early 1980s, six boats were further modified to carry the Trident I C-4 missile, along with six Benjamin Franklin-class boats. These were James Madison, Daniel Boone, John C. Calhoun, Von Steuben, Casimir Pulaski, and Stonewall Jackson.

== Fate ==
The James Madisons were decommissioned between 1986 and 1995 due to a combination of SALT II treaty limitations as the Ohio-class SSBNs entered service, age, and the collapse of the Soviet Union.

== Boats in class ==
Submarines of the James Madison class: (Submarines marked with * indicate Trident I C-4 ballistic missile conversions.)

Name	Hull number	Builder	Laid down	Launched	Commissioned	Decommissioned	Fate
James Madison*	SSBN-627	Newport News Shipbuilding and Drydock Co.	5 March 1962	15 March 1963	28 July 1964	20 November 1992	Disposed, (Note: through the Ship-Submarine Recycling Program) 1997
Tecumseh	SSBN-628	General Dynamics Electric Boat	1 June 1962	22 June 1963	29 May 1964	23 July 1993	Disposed, 1994
Daniel Boone*	SSBN-629	Mare Island Naval Shipyard	6 February 1962	22 June 1963	23 April 1964	18 February 1994	Disposed, 1994
John C. Calhoun*	SSBN-630	Newport News Shipbuilding and Drydock Co.	4 June 1962	22 June 1963	15 September 1964	28 March 1994	Disposed, 1994
Ulysses S. Grant	SSBN-631	General Dynamics Electric Boat	18 August 1962	2 November 1963	17 July 1964	12 June 1992	Disposed, 1992
Von Steuben*	SSBN-632	Newport News Shipbuilding and Drydock Co.	4 September 1962	18 October 1963	30 September 1964	26 February 1994	Disposed, 2001
Casimir Pulaski*	SSBN-633	General Dynamics Electric Boat	12 January 1963	1 February 1964	14 August 1964	7 March 1994	Disposed, 1994
Stonewall Jackson*	SSBN-634	Mare Island Naval Shipyard	4 July 1962	30 November 1963	26 August 1964	9 February 1995	Disposed, 1995
Sam Rayburn	SSBN-635	Newport News Shipbuilding and Drydock Co.	3 December 1962	20 December 1963	2 December 1964	31 July 1989	Left Norfolk on April 2, 2025, bound for Bremerton, Washington for storage and eventual recycling.
Nathanael Greene	SSBN-636	Portsmouth Naval Shipyard	21 May 1962	12 May 1964	19 December 1964	15 December 1986	Disposed, 2000

== See also ==
- List of submarines of the United States Navy
- List of submarine classes of the United States Navy
