= USS Stonewall Jackson =

Submarine of the United States

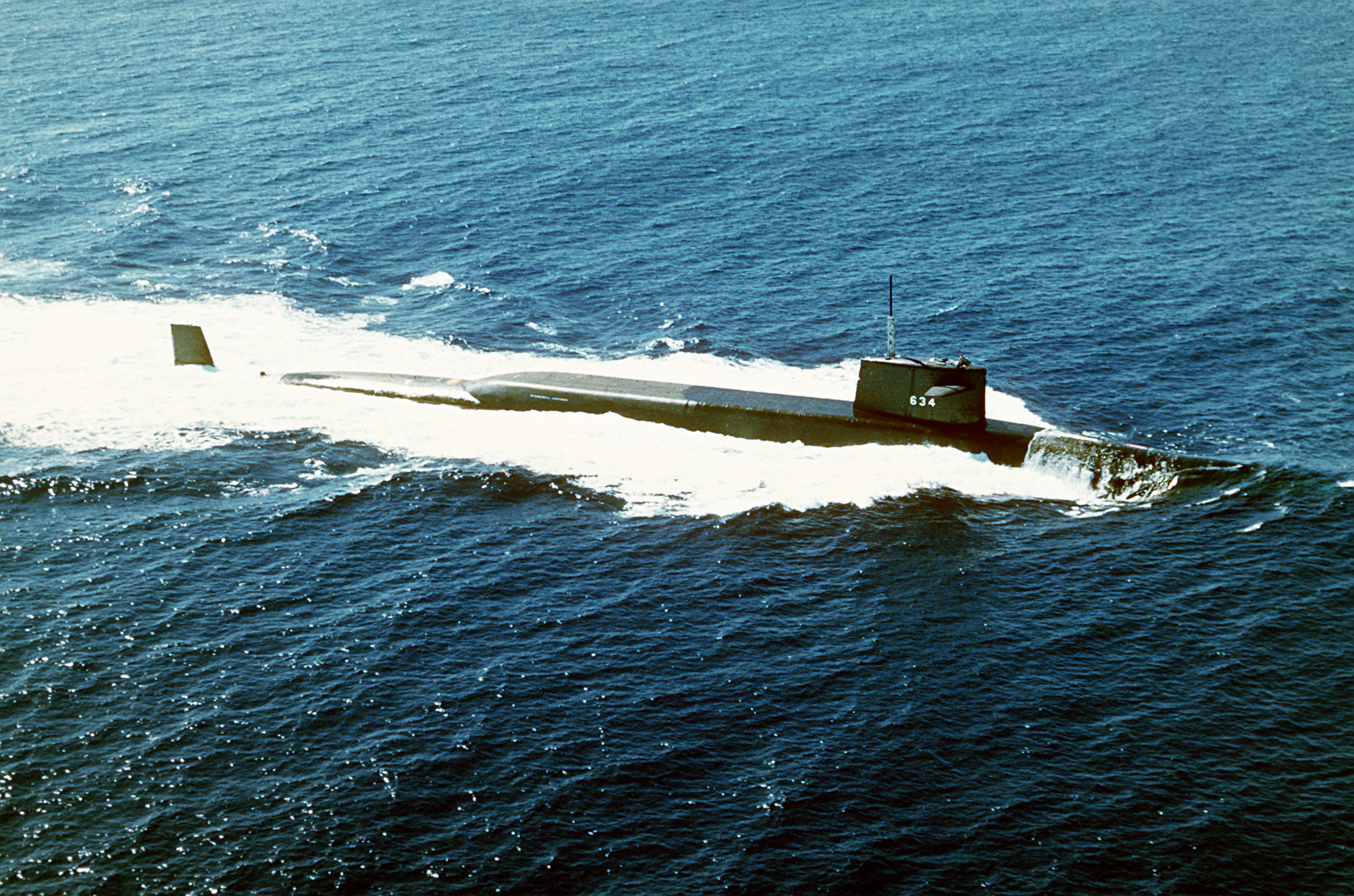
- USS Stonewall Jackson (SSBN-634) off Naval Air Station Barbers Point, Hawaii, on 1 February 1991.

History

United States
- Namesake: Thomas J. "Stonewall" Jackson
- Ordered: 21 July 1961
- Builder: Mare Island Naval Shipyard, Vallejo, California
- Laid down: 4 July 1962
- Launched: 30 November 1963
- Sponsored by: Miss Julia Christian McAfee
- Commissioned: 26 August 1964
- Decommissioned: 9 February 1995
- Stricken: 9 February 1995
- Motto: Strength - Mobility
- Nickname(s): "Stoney J"
- Fate: Scrapping via Ship-Submarine Recycling Program completed 13 October 1995

General characteristics
- Class & type: James Madison-class submarine
- Displacement: 7,300 long tons (7,417 t) surfaced; 8,250 long tons (8,382 t) submerged
- Length: 425 ft (130 m)
- Beam: 33 ft (10 m)
- Draft: 32 ft (9.8 m)
- Installed power: S5W reactor
- Propulsion: 2 × geared steam turbines, one shaft 15,000 shp (11,185 kW)
- Speed: Over 20 knots (37 km/h; 23 mph)
- Test depth: 1,300 feet (400 m)
- Complement: Two crews (Blue and Gold) of 13 officers and 130 enlisted men each
- Armament: 16 × ballistic missile tubes; 4 × 21 in (533 mm) torpedo tubes forward

USS Stonewall Jackson (SSBN-634, active 1963–1995), a James Madison-class fleet ballistic missile submarine, was the third ship of the United States Navy to be named for Confederate States Army General Thomas J. "Stonewall" Jackson (1824–1863).^{a}

== Construction and commissioning ==
The contract to build Stonewall Jackson was awarded to Mare Island Naval Shipyard at Vallejo, California, on 21 July 1961 and her keel was laid down there on 4 July 1962. She was launched on 30 November 1963, sponsored by Miss Julia Christian McAfee, great-granddaughter of General Jackson, and commissioned on 26 August 1964, with Commander John H. Nicholson in command of the Blue Crew and Commander Richard A. Frost in command of the Gold Crew.

== Service history ==
Stonewall Jackson departed Vallejo on 3 September 1964 for her shakedown cruise to Cape Kennedy, Florida. The Blue Crew completed training with a successful Polaris ballistic missile firing on 2 December 1964 and was relieved by the Gold Crew. Following the Gold Crew's successful Polaris missile launch on 16 December 1964, Stonewall Jackson returned to the Pacific Ocean to complete shakedown operations. She began post-shakedown alterations and repairs on 13 February 1965, then made final preparations at Bangor, Washington for an overseas deployment. In April 1965, she began her first strategic deterrent patrol.

In June 1965, the Gold Crew relieved the Blue Crew at Apra Harbor, Guam. For the next five years Stonewall Jackson conducted deterrent patrols from Apra Harbor.

In the spring of 1970, Stonewall Jackson was reassigned to the United States Atlantic Fleet. On 23 April 1970, she got underway from Pearl Harbor, Hawaii, to conduct a special operation, before continuing on to the Panama Canal. She transited the canal on 7 May 1970 and changed operational control from Submarine Flotilla 5 to Submarine Flotilla 6, officially joining the Atlantic Fleet. On 15 May 1970, she put into New London, Connecticut.

Stonewall Jackson spent the second half of May 1970 in upkeep at New London, then headed south on 1 June 1970. She stopped at the United States Naval Academy at Annapolis, Maryland, from 7 June to 10 June 1970 for midshipman indoctrination tours, then put to sea for special operations. She entered Charleston, South Carolina, to off-load ballistic missiles during the first week in July 1970, then shaped a course for New London, arriving on 10 July 1970. On 15 July she entered the shipyard of the Electric Boat Division of General Dynamics at Groton, Connecticut, for conversion to carry the Poseidon C-3 ballistic missile system.

The installation of the new missile system was completed by 29 October 1971, when the Blue Crew began preparations to put to sea. Between October 1971 and March 1972, both the Blue Crew and the Gold Crew conducted their shakedown cruises off the southeastern coast of the United States. Stonewall Jackson returned to Groton on 4 March 1971 and, on 8 March, commenced post-shakedown repairs and alterations at the General Dynamics shipyard.

On 7 April 1971, Stonewall Jackson got underway for Charleston for ballistic missile loading in preparation for her first post-conversion and first Atlantic deterrent patrol.

Stonewall Jackson was based at Holy Loch, Scotland, for patrol duties until mid-1978. She returned to the United States for an extensive overhaul at Portsmouth, New Hampshire Shipyard and was fitted with the Trident C-4 missile system at Pier side Port Canaveral, Florida in late 1988. 1988-1990 in Charleston, SC is where she deployed for patrols. She then operated out of Naval Submarine Base Kings Bay, Georgia, until her final patrol in 1994.

== Decommissioning and disposal ==
Stonewall Jackson was decommissioned on 9 February 1995 and simultaneously stricken from the Naval Vessel Register. Her scrapping via the Nuclear-Powered Ship and Submarine Recycling Program at Bremerton, Washington, was completed on 13 October 1995.

== Notes ==
^a The earlier two were known simply as USS Stonewall.
