= USS Ulysses S. Grant =

Submarine of the United States

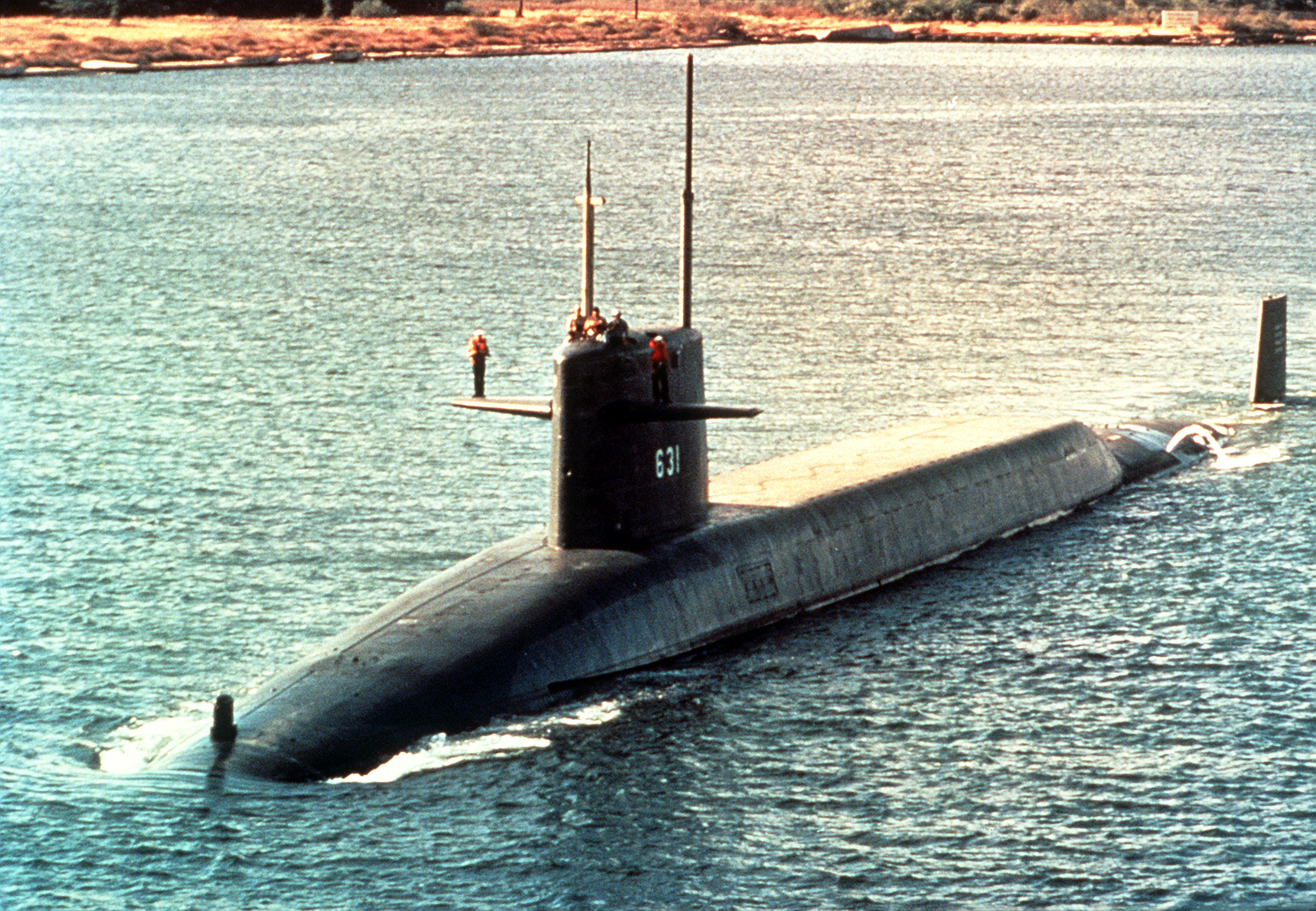
- USS Ulysses S. Grant (SSBN-631) entering point at Naval Air Station Barbers Point, Hawaii.

History

United States
- Namesake: Ulysses S. Grant (1822–1885), American Civil War general and the 18th President of the United States (1869-1877)
- Ordered: 20 July 1961
- Builder: Electric Boat, Groton, Connecticut
- Laid down: 18 August 1962
- Launched: 2 November 1963
- Sponsored by: Mrs. David W. Griffiths
- Commissioned: 17 July 1964
- Decommissioned: 12 June 1992
- Stricken: 12 June 1992
- Fate: Scrapped via Ship-Submarine Recycling Program completed 23 October 1993
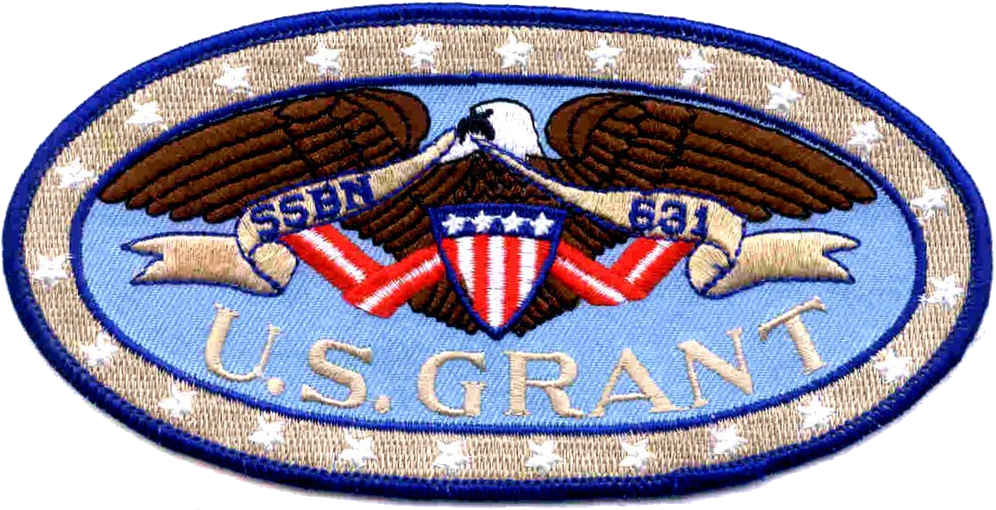
- Badge

General characteristics
- Class & type: James Madison-class submarine
- Displacement: 7,300 long tons (7,417 t) surfaced; 8,250 long tons (8,382 t) submerged
- Length: 425 ft (130 m)
- Beam: 33 ft (10 m)
- Draft: 32 ft (9.8 m)
- Installed power: S5W reactor
- Propulsion: 2 × geared steam turbines 15,000 shp (11,185 kW), one shaft
- Speed: Over 20 knots (37 km/h; 23 mph)
- Test depth: 1,300 feet (400 m)
- Complement: Two crews (Blue and Gold) of 13 officers and 130 enlisted each
- Armament: 16 × ballistic missile tubes (originally for Polaris missiles, later for Poseidon missiles; 4 × 21 in (533 mm) torpedo tubes (all forward)

USS Ulysses S. Grant (SSBN-631), a James Madison-class fleet ballistic missile submarine, was the third ship^{a} of the United States Navy to be named for Ulysses S. Grant (1822–1885), American Civil War general and the 18th President of the United States (1869–1877).

== Construction and commissioning ==
The contract to build Ulysses S. Grant was awarded to the Electric Boat Division of General Dynamics Corporation in Groton, Connecticut, on 20 July 1961 and her keel was laid down there on 18 August 1962. She was launched on 2 November 1963, sponsored by President Grant's great-granddaughter Edith (Grant) Griffiths, wife of Colonel David W. Griffiths (retired), and commissioned on 17 July 1964 with Captain J. L. From Jr., in command of the Blue Crew. In September, Commander C.A.K. McDonald took command of the Gold Crew.

== Service history ==
Following shakedown, the Ulysses S. Grant got underway from Groton in early December 1964, bound for the Pacific Ocean. Transiting the Panama Canal on 31 December 1964, she arrived at Pearl Harbor in January 1965. She was deployed to Guam, in the Mariana Islands, and conducted 18 deterrent patrols operating from there equipped with Polaris ballistic missiles before returning to the United States in 1969.

After an overhaul and conversion to carry Poseidon ballistic missiles at Puget Sound Naval Shipyard at Bremerton, Washington, Ulysses S. Grant was deployed to Holy Loch in Scotland in 1970, and operated in the European area until September 1977.

In the late 1970s, Ulysses S. Grant underwent a second refueling overhaul at Portsmouth Naval Shipyard, in Kittery, Maine. After the overhaul period, the Blue Crew, under Commander W.G. Ellis, completed what was called "The best DASO (Demonstration and Shakedown Operation) in 10 years,"^{b} which concluded with the firing of a test missile on 31 July 1980. Ulysses S. Grant then returned to Charleston, South Carolina, where, subsequent to normal change if command, the Gold Crew, under the command of Commander Michael P. McBride, took Ulysses S. Grant through a non-firing second-half DASO. During that period, the Gold Crew enjoyed a luxury for a "boomer"^{c} crew, a swim call in the Caribbean. USS Ulysses S. Grant continued to operate out of Holy Loch, Scotland, for several more years, until 1984.

In January 1984, the Ulysses S. Grant arrived at the Portsmouth Naval Shipyard for its third refueling and overhaul. On 6 April 1987, two crewmen of Ulysses S. Grant were swept off the submarine's missile deck during sea trials in heavy seas 3 miles off Portsmouth, New Hampshire. One man, Lt. David Jimenez of Groton, Connecticut, was rescued but was pronounced dead soon afterwards. The second man, Chief Torpedoman's Mate Larry Vernon Thompson of Concord, California, was searched for in the waters near the Isles of Shoals, but remained "lost at sea".A memorial service was held for both men at Portsmouth Naval Shipyard on Easter Monday April 20, 1987. Following an investigation, CDR Joseph F. Sabatini was relieved of duty.

In 1989, after the Blue Crew turned Ulysses S. Grant over to the Gold Crew while she was moored alongside the submarine tender USS Fulton, the Gold Crew took the submarine to Holy Loch, and Ulysses S. Grant operated on deterrent patrols out of Holy Loch for the remainder of her career.

== Decommissioning and disposal ==
Ulysses S. Grant was decommissioned on 12 June 1992 and stricken from the Naval Vessel Register on the same day. Her scrapping via the Nuclear-Powered Ship and Submarine Recycling Program at Bremerton, Washington was completed on 23 October 1993.

== Commemoration ==
Ulysses S. Grant's ship's bell is stored at Naval Base Kitsap, formerly Naval Submarine Base Bangor, at Bremerton, Washington. It has been used in retirement ceremonies.

== Notes ==
^a The earlier two were named simply USS U. S. Grant.
^b Quoted by SP 205.
^c United States Navy slang for a ballistic missile submarine.
