= USS Tecumseh (SSBN-628) =

United States Navy submarine (1963–1993)

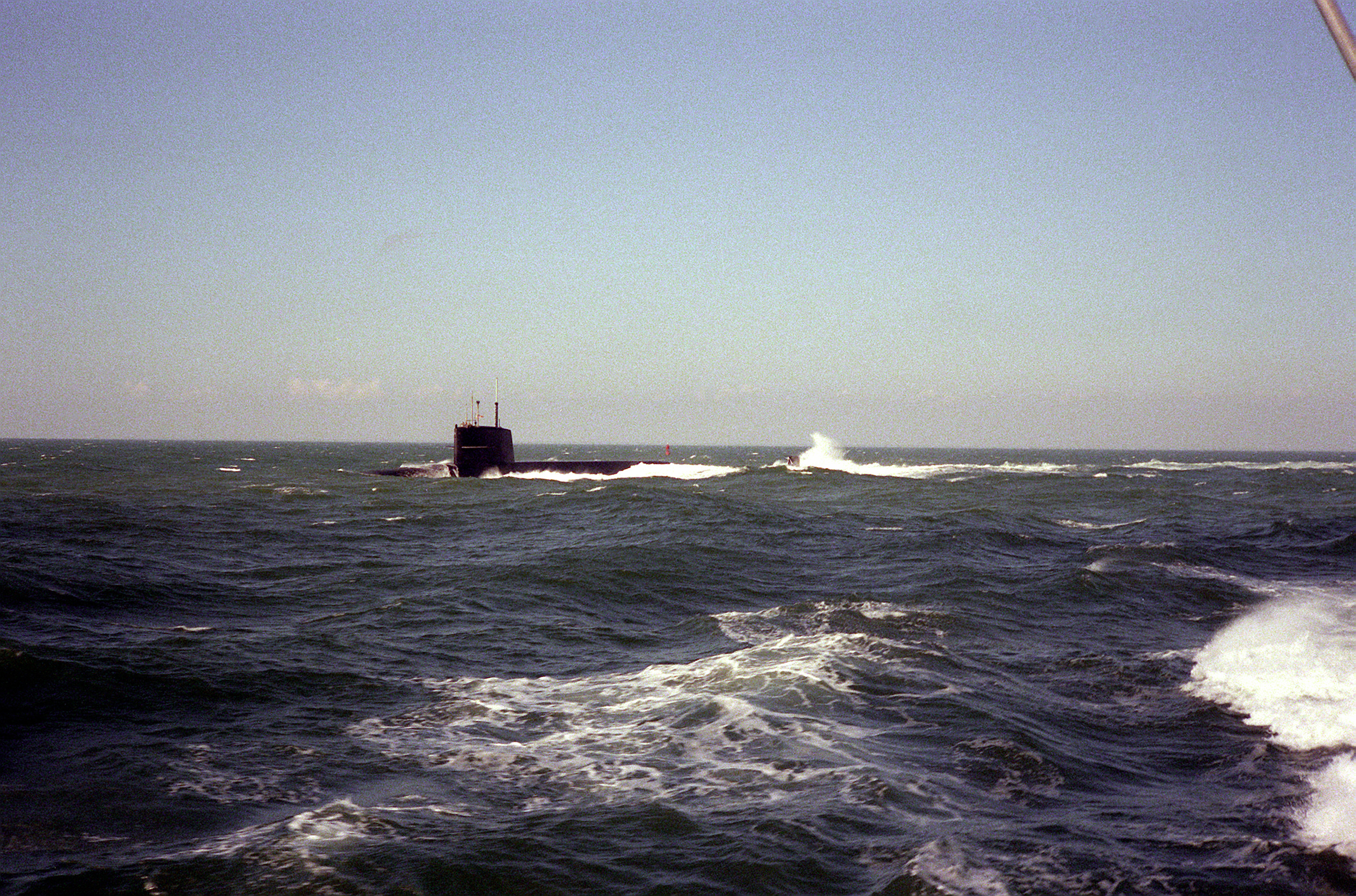
- USS Tecumseh (SSBN-628) underway east of Charleston, South Carolina, on 1 January 1986

History

United States
- Name: USS Tecumseh
- Namesake: Tecumseh (1768-1813), a Native American leader of the Shawnee
- Ordered: 20 July 1961
- Builder: Electric Boat, Groton, Connecticut
- Laid down: 1 June 1962
- Launched: 22 June 1963
- Sponsored by: Mrs. Robert L. F. Sikes
- Commissioned: 29 May 1964
- Decommissioned: 23 July 1993
- Stricken: 23 July 1993
- Motto: United for Freedom
- Fate: Scrapped via Ship-Submarine Recycling Program completed 1 April 1994

General characteristics
- Class & type: James Madison-class submarine
- Displacement: 7,300 long tons (7,417 t) surfaced; 8,250 long tons (8,382 t) submerged
- Length: 425 ft (130 m)
- Beam: 33 ft (10 m)
- Draft: 31 ft 4 in (9.55 m)
- Installed power: S5W reactor
- Propulsion: 2 × geared steam turbines, 15,000 shp (11,185 kW), 1 shaft
- Speed: 16 knots (30 km/h; 18 mph) surfaced; 21 knots (39 km/h; 24 mph) submerged
- Test depth: 1,300 ft (400 m)
- Complement: Two crews (Gold and Blue) of 140 each
- Armament: 4 × 21 in (533 mm) torpedo tubes forward; 16 × Polaris A3 missiles (replaced by Poseidon missiles in 1970)

USS Tecumseh (SSBN-628), a James Madison-class ballistic missile submarine, was the fourth ship of the United States Navy to be named for Tecumseh (c. 1768 – 1813), the leader of the Shawnee people.

== Construction and commissioning ==
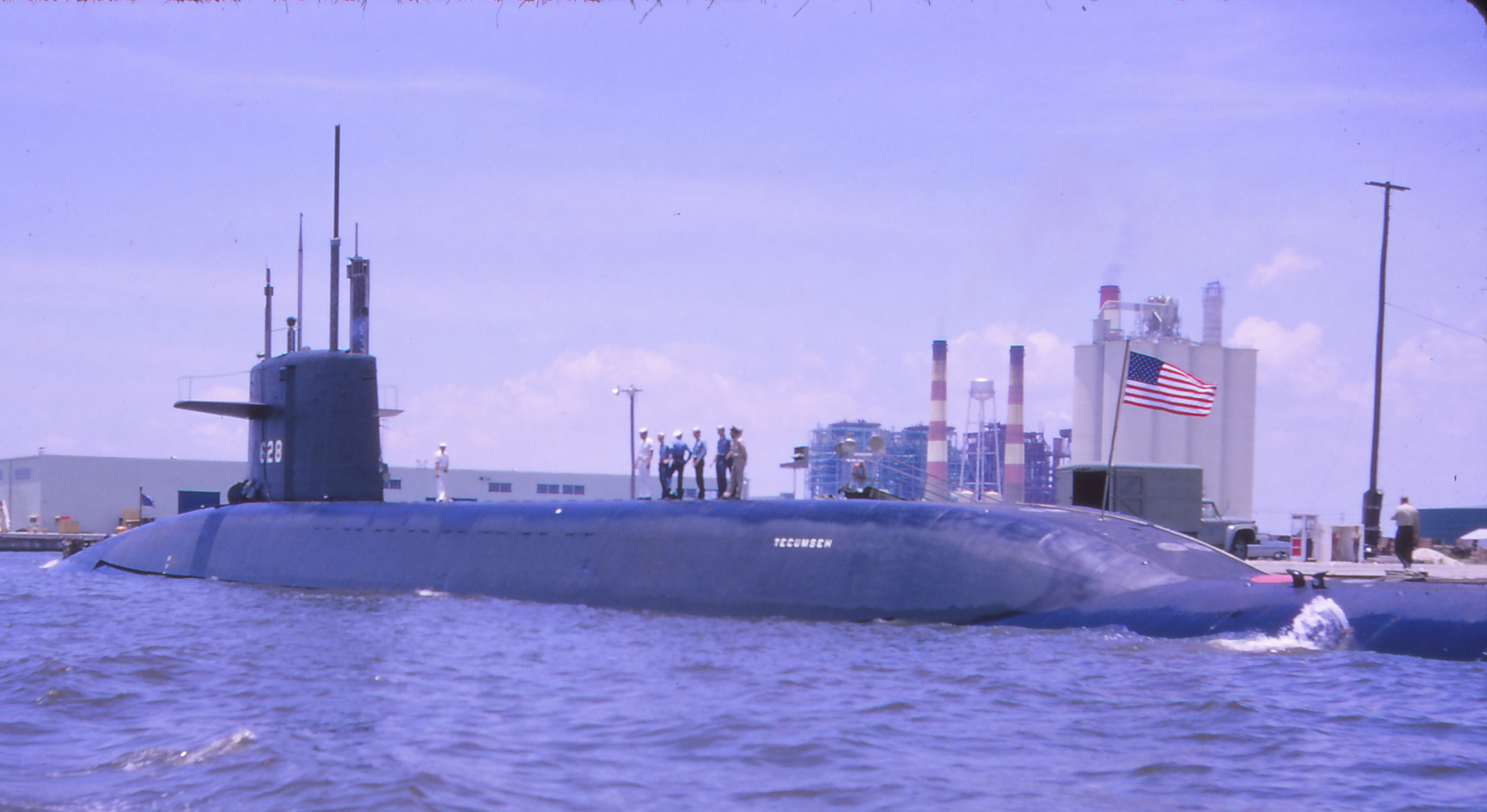
USS Tecumseh Fort Lauderdale, Florida, June 1964

The contract to build Tecumseh was awarded to the Electric Boat Division of the General Dynamics Corporation in Groton, Connecticut, on 20 July 1961. Originally, she was to have been named William Penn, and would have been the first Navy ship to bear that name, but was renamed on 11 April 1962.

Tecumseh's keel was laid down on 1 June 1962. She was launched on 22 June 1963 sponsored by Mrs. Mildred Inez (Tyner) Sikes, wife of Florida Congressman Robert L. F. Sikes, and commissioned on 29 May 1964, with Commander Arnett B. Taylor in command of the Blue Crew and Commander Charles S. Carlisle in command of the Gold Crew.

== Service history ==
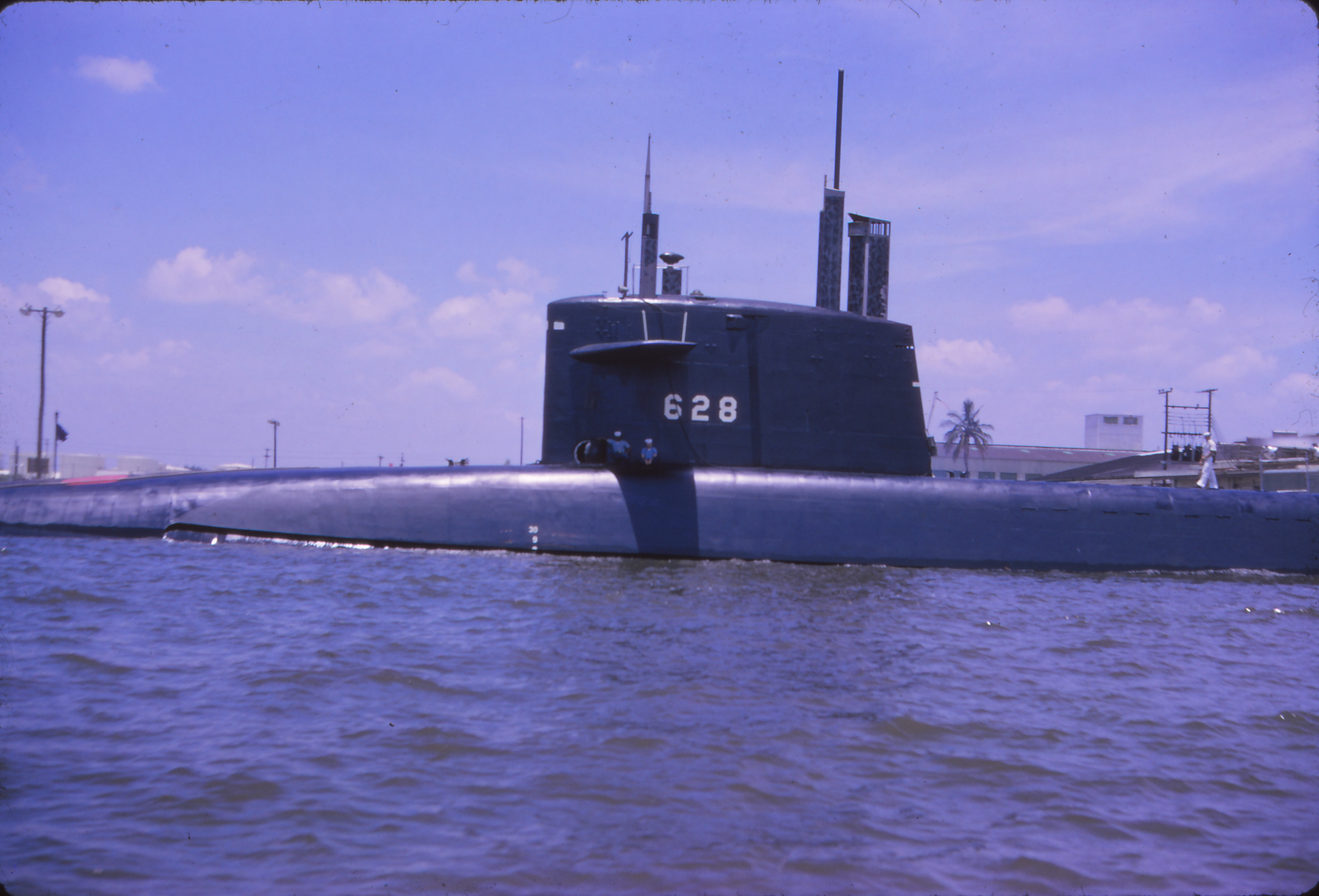
USS Tecumseh Fort Lauderdale, Florida. June 1964

Based at Pearl Harbor, Hawaii, Tecumseh deployed to the Mariana Islands on 17 December 1964, arriving at Guam on 29 December 1964 to commence deterrent patrols.

Tecumseh had conducted 21 strategic deterrent patrols in the Pacific by 1969, when she transferred to the United States Atlantic Fleet. She proceeded via Pearl Harbor and the Panama Canal to the United States East Coast and arrived at Newport News, Virginia, on 8 November 1969. Soon thereafter, she entered Newport News shipyard for a conversion which replaced her Polaris ballistic missile system with the new Poseidon ballistic missile system. Emerging from dry dock on 9 May 1970, Tecumseh underwent a thorough overhaul through that fall and winter before being assigned a new home port of Charleston, South Carolina, on 18 February 1971.

Tecumseh conducted sea trials and shakedown out of Charleston before conducting two deterrent patrols in late 1971. Subsequently deployed to Holy Loch, Scotland, Tecumseh arrived in Scottish waters on 9 February 1972. She conducted 18 more deterrent patrols out of Holy Loch through 1976.

Tecumseh was homeported in Charleston, South Carolina, at least from March 1982 until entering Newport News shipyard for a refueling overhaul in 1983. After completion of this overhaul in Spring of 1987 she successfully completed sea trials, shakedown, and a successful missile launch and returned to her home port of Charleston, South Carolina,

From 1987 to 1992 Tecumseh was homeported in Charleston, South Carolina, making patrols from both Charleston and Holy Loch Scotland. In 1992, Tecumseh off-loaded its missiles and participated in war games out of Charleston for training of attack boats and other Anti-Submarine warfare vessels or planes. In January 1993, Tecumseh transited the Panama Canal, and subsequently ported in Bremerton, Washington, for decommissioning.

== Decommissioning and disposal ==
Tecumseh was decommissioned and stricken from the Naval Vessel Register on 23 July 1993. Her scrapping via the Nuclear-Powered Ship and Submarine Recycling Program at Bremerton, Washington, was completed on 1 April 1994.

== Memorials ==
Tecumseh's starboard torpedo tubes and a large piece of pressure hull were preserved and are now on display at the Naval Undersea Museum at Keyport, Washington.
