= USS Sculpin =

Three ships of the United States Navy have borne the name USS Sculpin, named in honor of the sculpin.

- USS Sculpin (SS-191), was a Sargo-class submarine, commissioned in 1939 and stricken in 1944.
- USS Sculpin (SS-494), a submarine cancelled in August 1945 before she was laid down.
- USS Sculpin (SSN-590), was a Skipjack-class submarine, commissioned in 1961 and stricken in 1990.
