= USS Theodore Roosevelt (SSBN-600) =

George Washington-class submarine

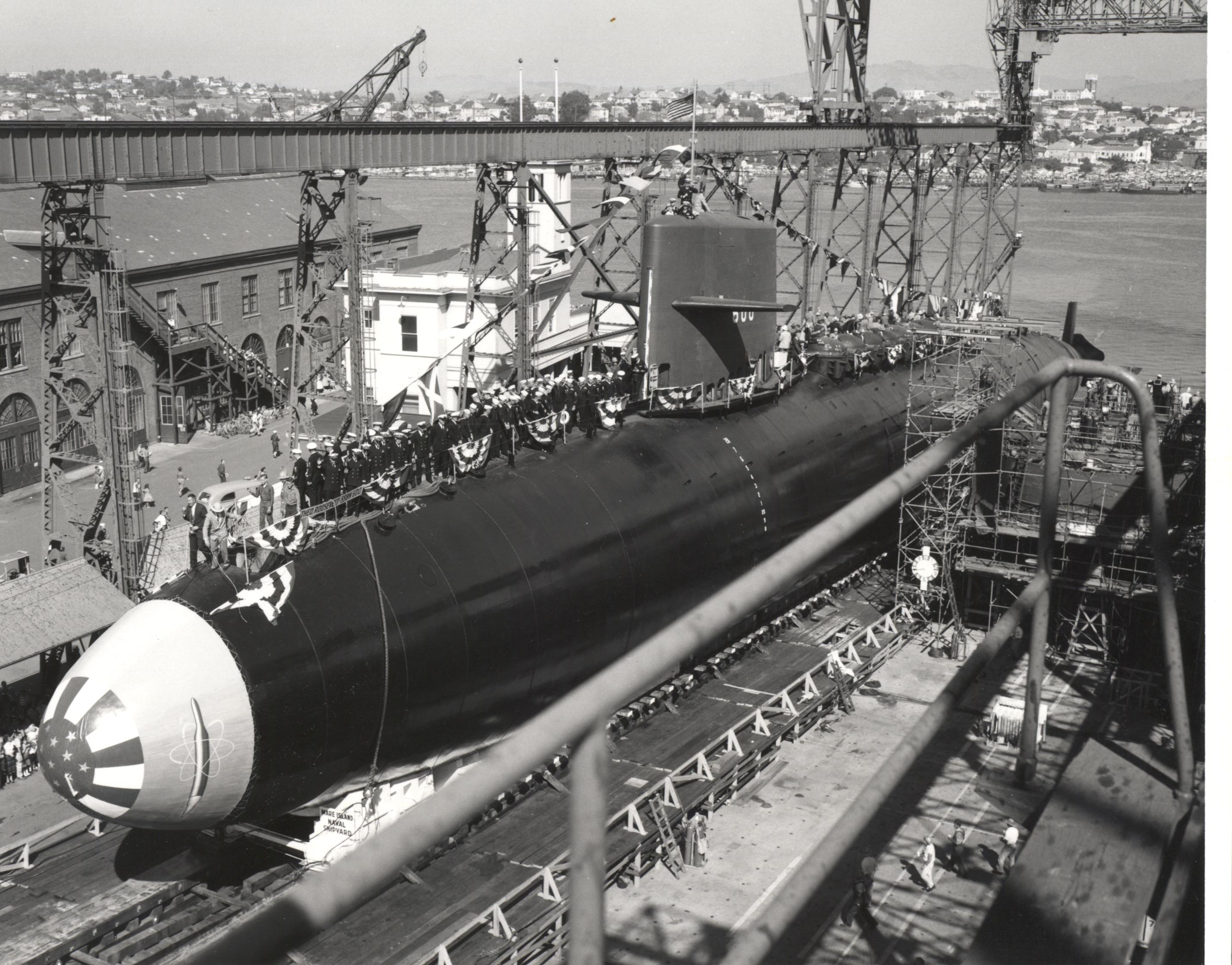
- The launching of USS Theodore Roosevelt on 1959-10-03.

History

United States
- Name: Theodore Roosevelt
- Namesake: President Theodore Roosevelt (1858–1919)
- Builder: Mare Island Naval Shipyard
- Laid down: 20 May 1958
- Launched: 3 October 1959
- Sponsored by: Alice Roosevelt Longworth
- Commissioned: 13 February 1961
- Decommissioned: 28 February 1981
- Renamed: from Scamp (SSN-600), 6 November 1958
- Stricken: 1 December 1982
- Home port: Pearl Harbor, Hawaii
- Fate: Recycling via Ship-Submarine Recycling Program completed 24 March 1995
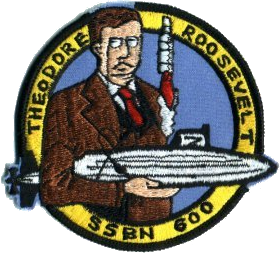
- Badge

General characteristics
- Class & type: George Washington-class submarine
- Displacement: 5400 tons light; 5959–6019 tons surfaced; 6709–6888 Approx. tons submerged
- Length: 381.6 ft (116.3 m)
- Beam: 33 ft (10 m)
- Draft: 29 ft (8.8 m)
- Propulsion: 1 S5W PWR; 2 geared turbines at 15,000shp; 1 shaft
- Speed: 20 kn (37 km/h) surfaced; +25 kn (46 km/h) submerged
- Range: unlimited except by food supplies
- Test depth: 700 ft (210 m)
- Complement: Two crews (Blue/Gold) each consisting of 12 officers, 100 enlisted
- Armament: 16 Polaris A1/A3 missiles; 6 × 21 in (530 mm) torpedo tubes

USS Theodore Roosevelt (SSBN-600), a George Washington-class submarine, was the second ship of the United States Navy to be named for President Theodore Roosevelt (1858–1919). Initially unnamed and assigned hull classification symbol SSGN-600 as a guided missile submarine, her keel was laid down on 20 May 1958 by the Mare Island Naval Shipyard using components initially assembled for the Skipjack-class submarine nuclear attack submarine USS Scamp (SSN-588). She was named Theodore Roosevelt and redesignated fleet ballistic missile submarine SSBN-600 on 6 November 1958, launched on 3 October 1959, sponsored by Alice Roosevelt Longworth, daughter of Theodore Roosevelt and widow of Nicholas Longworth III, and commissioned on 13 February 1961 with Commander William E. Sims commanding the Blue Crew and Commander Oliver H. Perry Jr. commanding the Gold Crew.

== 1960s ==
On 18 February 1961, Theodore Roosevelt departed Mare Island, California, bound for the East Coast of the United States. On 7 March, she became the first FBM submarine to transit the Panama Canal. On 11 March 1961, she arrived at Cape Canaveral, Florida. After successfully firing her first Polaris A1 missile on 20 March 1961 and completing her shakedown training, she arrived in Groton, Connecticut, on 1 May for post-shakedown repairs at the Electric Boat Company shipyard. She completed those repairs on 24 June 1961 and departed Groton, bound for Charleston, South Carolina. Theodore Roosevelt stopped at Norfolk, Virginia, along the way and arrived at Charleston on 7 July 1961. Between 7 July and 19 July 1961, she loaded Polaris missiles at the Naval Ammunition Depot, Charleston, and made all other preparations for her first deployment. On 19 July 1961, she stood out of Charleston on her first deterrent patrol. She concluded that patrol on 23 September 1961 at the FBM submarine base at Holy Loch, Scotland.

Over the next three and one-half years, Theodore Roosevelt made 15 more deterrent patrols from the Holy Loch. Late in the spring of 1965, she departed Holy Loch on her 17th and final patrol of the deployment to Holy Loch. She concluded that patrol and the deployment when she arrived in Charleston on 15 June 1965. She unloaded her 16 Polaris missiles and then departed Charleston for New London, Connecticut, where she arrived on 26 June 1965.

At New London, Theodore Roosevelt entered the shipyard of the Electric Boat Division for an extensive overhaul. Between July 1965 and January 1967, her nuclear reactor was refueled and her Polaris weapon system was modified to accept the more advanced Polaris A3 missile. She completed overhaul on 14 January 1967 and began sea trials and refresher training, all of which culminated in the successful firing of a Polaris A3 missile at the Cape Canaveral missile range late in April 1967. At the end of the training period, she returned to Charleston to load missiles and to prepare for another series of deterrent patrols out of Holy Loch. She embarked upon her 18th patrol on 1 June 1967 and completed that cruise at the Holy Loch base.

Theodore Roosevelt's second tour of duty operating from the Scotland base proved to be very brief in comparison to her first. Between mid-June 1967 and February 1968, she completed her 18th through 21st patrols. On 20 March 1968 while returning to Holy Loch from her 21st patrol, she ran aground off the western coast of Scotland. After drydocking for temporary correction of the damage, she departed Holy Loch on 5 April 1968 to return to the United States for permanent repairs. Between 18 April and 20 April 1968 she unloaded her missiles at Charleston and headed north to New London. On 23 April 1968, she arrived in the shipyard of the Electric Boat Division and commenced an extended repair period. Labor disputes caused delays, and Theodore Roosevelt did not complete her repairs until mid-October 1968. She spent the latter part of that month in sea trials and then departed New London on 2 November 1968 on her post-repair shakedown cruise. She visited Norfolk, Virginia, Puerto Rico, and St. Croix in the United States Virgin Islands before concluding the cruise at Charleston on 27 November 1968. She conducted training operations out of Charleston before deploying to Holy Loch again early in 1969.

== 1970s ==
That tour of duty lasted until May 1971. During the interim, Theodore Roosevelt conducted nine more deterrent patrols, returning to Holy Loch for refit after each. On 12 May 1971, she stood out of Holy Loch on the 31st patrol of her career. On 20 July 1971, she arrived in New London completing both the patrol and the Holy Loch deployment. She remained in New London for three weeks, during which time members of her Blue crew and her Gold crew were brought together into a single overhaul crew while other members of both crews moved on to other assignments. On 10 August 1971, she headed south to Charleston where she arrived on 13 August 1971. Over the next month, she underwent refit and then departed Charleston on 11 September 1971 for special operations. Theodore Roosevelt returned to Charleston on 30 September 1971 and remained there a week and a day before returning to sea for another three weeks of special operations. She reentered Charleston on 1 November 1971 and began preoverhaul restricted repairs. Three weeks later, she officially began her refueling overhaul, which lasted for more than two years.

Theodore Roosevelt completed her overhaul in January 1974. During the following two months, she conducted sea trials out of Charleston. In April and May shakedown training and nuclear weapons certification preparations occupied her time. In June, she conducted a one-week United States Naval Academy midshipman familiarization cruise out of New London, then underwent nuclear propulsion safety training before deperming at Norfolk. In mid-June, she received word of her reassignment to the United States Pacific Fleet with her new home port to be Pearl Harbor, Hawaii. Between July and September 1974, Theodore Roosevelt conducted another midshipman training cruise; then settled into pre-deployment training and preparations. She departed Charleston on 20 September 1974, transited the Panama Canal on 5 October, and, after a nine-day stop for missile load-out at Strategic Weapons Facility, Pacific in Bangor, Washington, continued on to Pearl Harbor, where she arrived on 4 November 1974. On 10 November, she departed Pearl Harbor, bound for the Mariana Islands. She entered port at Guam on 24 November, underwent refit at her new advanced base there, and began her first deterrent patrol in the Pacific Ocean on 31 December 1974.

Theodore Roosevelt conducted patrols out of Apra Harbor, Guam, with support from the USS Proteus (AS-19) until beginning her last patrol (Patrol 46) on 9 October 1978, which ended in Pearl Harbor. Upon arrival in Pearl Harbor, a new crew was formed from members of the former Blue and Gold crews. From November 1978 until October 1979, Theodore Roosevelt served as a "target of opportunity" for various ASW forces including ships, aircraft and submarines. During this period she made several port calls to Lahaina, Maui, Kona, Hawaii, and Nawiliwili, Kauai. On 16 October 1979, the ship got underway from Pearl Harbor for San Diego, California, arriving on 25 October. She transited from San Diego to Alameda from 29 to 31 October. On 7 November, Theodore Roosevelt transited from Alameda to Esquimalt, British Columbia, arriving on 10 November. On 14 November, the ship left Esquimalt and arrived at Carr Inlet, Washington for acoustic testing while suspended on cables. On 19 November, she transited to Bangor, Washington, and submitted the first official work request (2-Kilo) to the newly established Trident Refit Facility. On 1 December 1979, she became the first Fleet Ballistic Missile Submarine to offload her A-3 Missiles at the newly built Explosives Handling Wharf. She was the "first to do it last". Theodore Roosevelt was then officially taken out of service. The crew was reduced to 12 officers and 111 enlisted men, who were designated as the Deactivation Crew.

== Decommissioning and disposal ==
Theodore Roosevelt commenced the Deactivation Availability process on 3 January 1980 at Submarine Base Bangor. In mid-year she was moved to Puget Sound Naval Shipyard (PSNS) for drydocking alongside Abraham Lincoln, where the reactor fuel was removed and the missile compartment dismantled to comply with SALT requirements. The forward and aft ends of the hull were then re-joined at the aft bulkhead of the Operations compartment, and the forward bulkhead of the reactor compartment. The ship undocked and moved pier-side where a formal decommissioning ceremony occurred on 28 February 1981. The deactivation crew then detached and transferred to other Navy assignments. PSNS continued deactivation work pier-side, completing Deactivation Availability on 1 December 1982. The hull was placed in afloat storage at PSNS, and the ship stricken from the Naval Registry of Ships on that date. The hull remained in afloat storage in two configurations for almost 13 years, pending government decisions for the methods to dispose of de-fueled nuclear reactor compartments and the remaining hulls.

In 1988, the hull of Theodore Roosevelt was drydocked at PSNS for removal and disposal of the reactor compartment. An environmental impact study was approved in 1984 for the disposal of de-fueled submarine reactor compartments via permanent storage at the federal government reservation at Hanford, Washington. The reactor compartment was separated from the hull, placed on a barge in the drydock, and prepared for waterborne shipment to Hanford. The hull was re-joined at the aft bulkhead of the operations compartment, and the forward bulkhead of Auxiliary Machinery Space-2. Both hull and barge were undocked, with the hull returning to afloat storage and the reactor compartment transported to Hanford. The Hanford Burial Trench 94 numbering system indicates that the SSBN-600 RC was the seventh placed in that facility on 1 November 1989.

The remaining hull of Theodore Roosevelt was drydocked for the final time at PSNS in 1993, to enter the Nuclear Power Ship and Submarine Recycling Program. Final dismantling and recycling were accomplished based on a 1990 environmental impact study approving this method. On 24 March 1995, the disposal work was completed.
