= USS Skipjack (SSN-585) =

Submarine of the United States

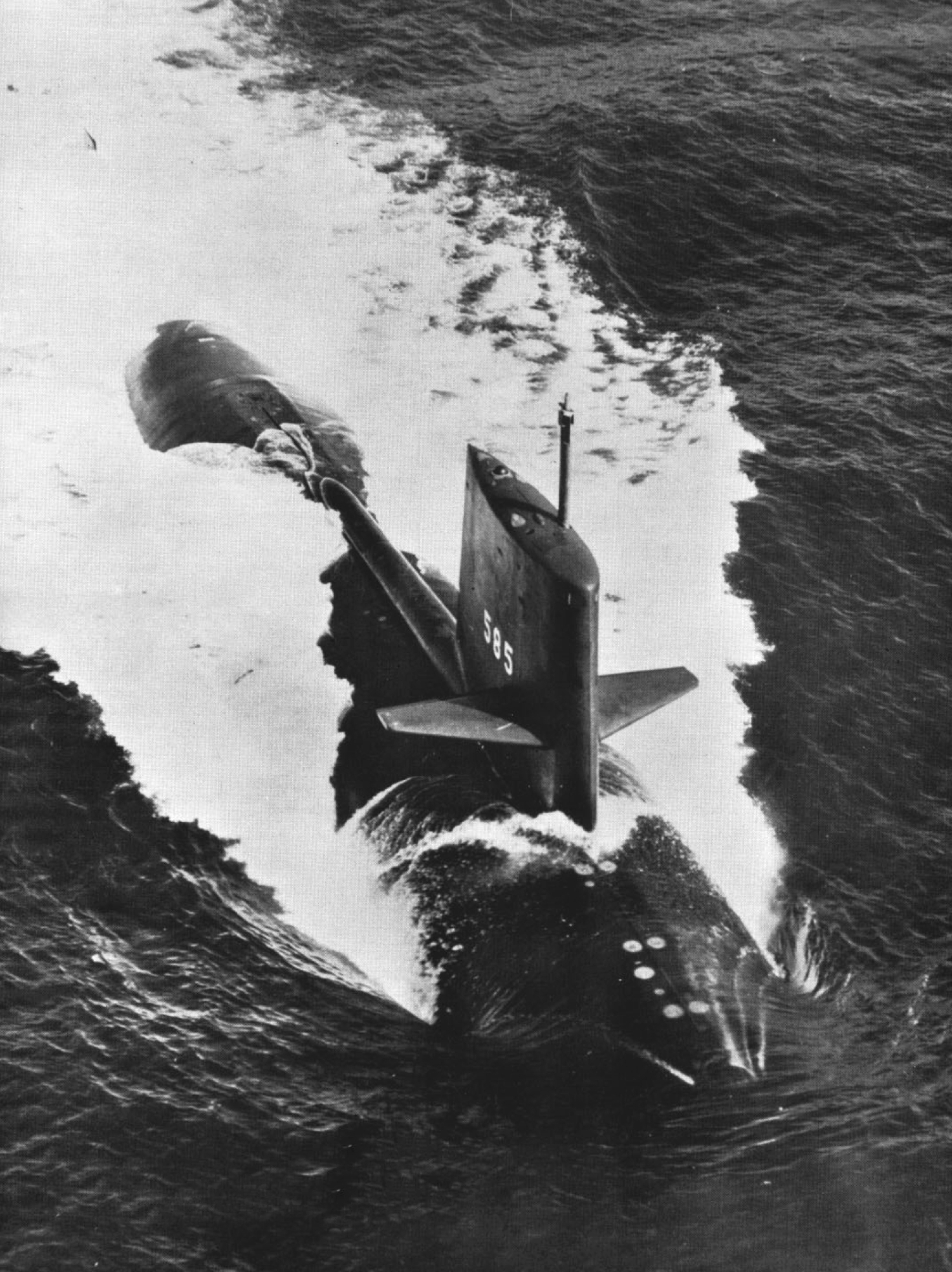
- USS Skipjack (SSN-585)

History

United States
- Name: Skipjack
- Namesake: The skipjack, a type of tuna
- Awarded: 5 October 1955
- Builder: General Dynamics Electric Boat
- Laid down: 29 May 1956
- Launched: 26 May 1958
- Commissioned: 15 April 1959
- Decommissioned: 19 April 1990
- Stricken: 19 April 1990
- Motto: Radix Nova Tridentis; (Latin for "Root of the New Sea Power")
- Fate: Entered the Submarine Recycling Program, 17 March 1996

General characteristics
- Class & type: Skipjack-class submarine
- Type: Nuclear-Powered Attack Submarine
- Displacement: 3,075 long tons (3,124 t) surfaced; 3,513 long tons (3,569 t) submerged
- Length: 251 ft 8 in (76.71 m)
- Beam: 31 ft 7.75 in (9.6457 m)
- Draft: 29 ft 5 in (8.97 m)
- Propulsion: 1 × S5W reactor; 2 × Westinghouse steam turbines, 15,000 shp (11 MW); 1 shaft
- Speed: > 20 knots (23 mph; 37 km/h) (official); ~31 kn (36 mph; 57 km/h) (theoretical); Actual values are classified.
- Complement: 93 officers & men
- Armament: 6 × 21 in (530 mm) torpedo tubes

USS Skipjack (SSN-585), the lead ship of her class of nuclear-powered attack submarine, was the third ship of the United States Navy to be named after the Skipjack tuna.

== Construction and commissioning ==
Skipjack′s keel was laid down on 29 May 1956 by the Electric Boat Division of the General Dynamics Corporation at Groton, Connecticut. She was launched on 26 May 1958, sponsored by Helen Mahon, wife of Representative George H. Mahon from the 19th district of Texas, and commissioned on 15 April 1959 with Commander W. W. Behrens, Jr., in command.

== Advances in submarine design ==
On the Skipjack, there were many design changes that were products of new scientific insight into submarine design. The submarine industry, now with nuclear power, had wanted to make a "true" submarine. This required a design in its element underwater, not solely one theoretically able to remain submerged indefinitely. The greatest alteration was the new tear-drop hull, pioneered by the conventionally powered USS Albacore, and designed for optimum performance underwater. The Albacore was the world underwater speed record holder in 1966 at 34.8 knots, around 40 mph, outpacing all nuclear powered subs. The new hull's only protrusions were the sail and diving planes. The 23-foot sail, resembling a shark's dorsal fin, rose at a point midway in the hull to keep the ship stable. The diving planes, similar in function to the wings of an airplane, were moved from the hull to this new sail, with the periscopes and antenna masts. Thus, they could be useful only when the submarine is in its natural environment—like the control surfaces on an airplane. Also, a single propeller behind the rudder now propelled Skipjack, making it more maneuverable.

Other experiments in design also benefited Skipjack by allowing the vessel to be built with improved steel. Areas from the control room (featuring push-button control of pneumatic and trim systems), to the anchor (streamlined to reduce drag and flow noise) were changed in the development of the new submarine. To power the new class, the Westinghouse S5W reactor plant was introduced, the third generation of submarine reactors since the launch of the USS Nautilus (SSN-571). The improved core life allowed the ship to travel at full power for 90,000 to 100,000 miles (161,000 km). Nuclear power had already been employed on the Nautilus and the follow-on Skate class, but the 15,000 SHP plant was such an advance that it entirely changed a submarine's capability. Furthermore, although the S5W reactor was thirty percent bigger than the S1W plant on Nautilus, the reactor compartment on Skipjack occupied but twenty feet of the ship's 252 feet (77 m) total length. (This reactor proved so successful that it became the "standard" reactor plant for almost all submarines until the Los Angeles class.) Finally, the design of the core was such that it became the new standard of accessibility.

Skipjack had such advanced underwater capabilities that her path could be compared to an airplane in flight. As earlier private inventors like John P. Holland had envisioned, the submarine was designed as having its natural environment underwater, and became capable of things never before seen.

== After launch ==
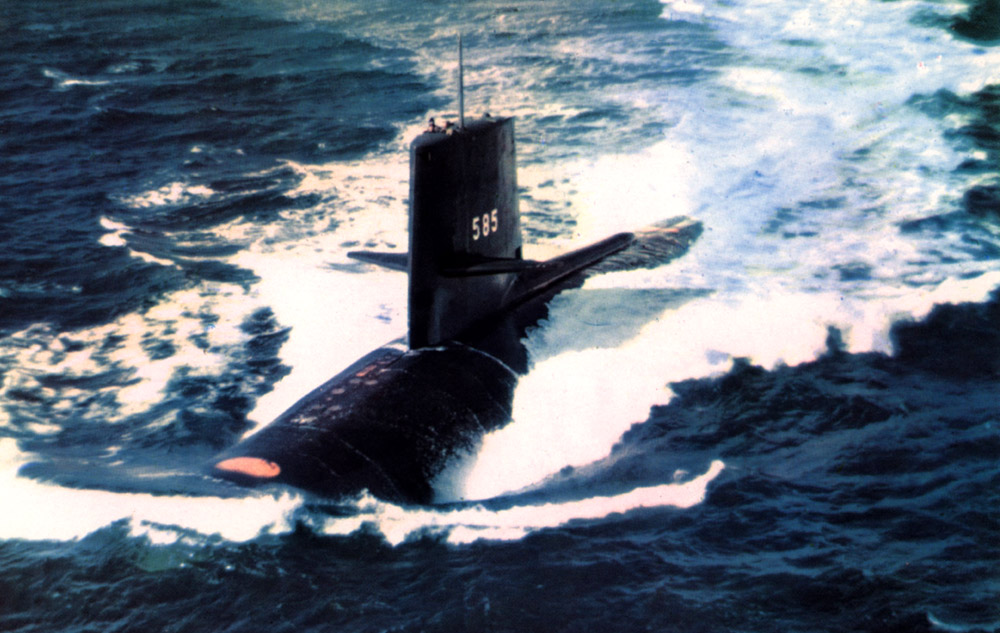
The most commonly found public relations photo of Skipjack

The boat's motto was Radix Nova Tridentis, meaning "Root of the New Sea Power"; and correctly so, as every US attack submarine until 1988 (when the diving planes moved back to the bow on the improved Los Angeles class) turned out to follow the Skipjack's design.

After being launched 26 May 1958, Skipjack was soon dubbed the "world's fastest submarine", after setting the speed record on sea trials in March of the following year. It was designed to have a speed in excess of 20 knots, but its actual speed was a guarded secret. However, the rated reactor power in shaft horsepower (15,000 shp) and reasonable assumptions about the hull's coefficient of drag, cross sectional area, and appendage drag can be combined via algebra to show that the vessel should have reached 31 knots submerged. This speed was some 9 knots faster than the Nautilus made using the same basic reactor, and only 2 knots shy of the Albacore's best theoretical submerged speed (33 kn).

Skipjack's maneuver capabilities, furthermore, added a whole different dimension to ASW problems as she could reverse direction in the distance of her own length, and were referred to as "flying", as Skipjack and her sister ships climbed, dove, and banked like an airplane. The antisubmarine warfare (ASW) problems created by such maneuverability and high sustained speeds took several decades to resolve to parity.

Shorter than following classes, Skipjack lacked the space to be upgraded with newer systems, meaning that in her later years she had second-class sonar equipment and fire-control systems. Despite these limitations, she remained an effective attack submarine through to the end of her career. She received a new seven-bladed propeller during a refit between 1973 and 1976—replacing the noisier five-bladed propeller with which she had set a trans-Atlantic underwater crossing record in an early return from a forward deployment in the Mediterranean – quieted her considerably but also reduced her speed noticeably.

== 1960s ==
During her shakedown cruise in August 1959, she became the first nuclear ship to pass through the Strait of Gibraltar and operate in the Mediterranean. Following post-shakedown availability at Groton, Connecticut, the nuclear submarine conducted type training and participated in an advanced Atlantic submarine exercise from May through July 1960, which earned the submarine a Navy Unit Commendation, and also a Battle Efficiency "E" award, an award it would receive three more times.

In late 1960, Skipjack violated Soviet territorial waters by sailing up Kola Bay while submerged. She passed within 30–40 yards (27–37 m) of a pier at Murmansk. The submarine's location data recorder was deliberately disabled to prevent the incursion from producing an official record. Upon returning from this mission, Skipjack spent the remainder of 1960 in a restricted yard of availability and upkeep.

Skipjack commenced her 1961 operations by participating in two weeks of type training followed by anti-submarine warfare exercises through August, visiting Mayport, Florida, before returning to Groton.

In January 1962, Skipjack operated out of Key West, Florida, for two weeks before entering the Portsmouth Naval Shipyard in Maine for extensive overhaul, lasting four and one-half months. Following her return to New London, Connecticut, the submarine operated locally prior to departing in October for duty in the Mediterranean with the Sixth Fleet. During this tour, Skipjack participated in various fleet and NATO exercises and visited Toulon, France; and La Spezia and Naples, Italy, before returning to New London. In this year, the Skipjack also conducted the fastest submerged transit of the Atlantic Ocean on record, which is a record that still stands.

The year 1963 was occupied in submarine attack operations and ASW exercises, all designed to test the capabilities of the nuclear-powered attack submarine. The highlight of 1964 was two months of duty with NATO forces, participating in exercises "Masterstroke" and "Teamwork" and visiting Le Havre, France, and the Isle of Portland, England, before returning to New London in October.

After devoting most of 1965 to training exercises, the submarine ended the year by entering the Charleston Naval Shipyard in South Carolina for an overhaul that lasted until 18 October 1966. Skipjack then got underway for sea trials off Charleston, before joining Shark for four days of type training in the Jacksonville, Florida, area. She then sailed to her new home port, Norfolk, Virginia, before participating in Atlantic Fleet exercises.

Early in February 1967, Skipjack got underway for sonar and weapon tests and then participated in Atlantic submarine exercises from March through June. July and August were spent in restricted availability at the Newport News Shipbuilding and Dry Dock Company following which Skipjack took part in FIXWEX G-67, an exercise designed to evaluate fixed wing ASW aircraft against a submarine with Skipjack's characteristics. Following an extended deployment in October and November, the submarine returned to Norfolk to prepare for major operations of that year which she completed on 25 February 1968. The remainder of 1968 was spent in local operations in the Norfolk area.

On 9 April 1969, Skipjack commenced an overhaul in the Norfolk Naval Shipyard which was completed in the fall of 1970. After sea trials in December 1970, Skipjack returned to her regular duties.

== 1970s ==
Highlights of 1971 were sound trials and weapons system tests at the Atlantic Fleet Range, Puerto Rico, from 25 January through 5 March and NATO exercise "Royal Night" from 15 September to 9 October. On 22 October, Skipjack returned to Norfolk, where she remained through January 1972.

Skipjack spent most of 1972 in tests and type training out of Groton, Connecticut and Norfolk, VA as well as the Caribbean. The submarine returned to Norfolk in late 1972.

Toward the end of spring in 1973, Skipjack returned to the Mediterranean Sea and conducted several exercises with the Sixth Fleet. During that time Skipjack was home ported at La Maddalena on the NE corner of Sardinia. Returning to Norfolk in September Skipjack crossed paths with Hurricane Ellen during the Atlantic transit. Down in the subsurface calm, the crew were hardly even aware of the turbulence above them.

After returning to Norfolk, Skipjack conducted several exercises with ASW aircraft flying from air bases in Virginia and North Carolina. In these exercises Skipjack played the role of a Russian submarine; ASW forces were to locate, track and conduct simulated attacks against the Skipjack. During the exercise, Skipjack was placed under certain handicaps that would not have been present in normal operations; for instance, she was restricted to a designated operating area measuring 20 miles by 10 miles. Also, at that time, Skipjack had a noise problem in her reduction gears. ASW crews were provided the sound profile of the reduction gears; in addition, Skipjack was required to generate a unique sound signal at all times. This was done so the ASW crews could be certain they were targeting the right submarine and not accidentally launch a simulated attack on a real Russian submarine. As a result of all these safety measures and restrictions, the ASW forces were able to locate Skipjack nearly 50 percent of the time.

At the end 1973 Skipjack was transferred to the submarine base at Groton in preparation for a refueling overhaul at General Dynamics' Electric Boat Division. After conducting a few more exercises, Skipjack entered the shipyard for overhaul in the summer of 1974.

Skipjack completed the overhaul and a follow-on dry docking by the summer of 1977. Following a change of command, Skipjack proceeded to the Autec range for a series of shakedown and certification exercises. Skipjack then deployed to the Mediterranean in October, 1977, returning in March 1978.

Later that year, Skipjack completed a 59 day ASW exercise northern Atlantic, with a stop in Holy Loch, Scotland. The ship then conducted a surface transit down Irish Sea to Plymouth, England, before returning to Groton.

Late in 1978, Skipjack again deployed to the Mediterranean, returning late spring of 1979. During this period, Skipjack was awarded the Comsubron 2 Battle Efficiency “E.”

== 1980s ==
From early December 1979 to mid-February 1980, Skipjack engaged in NATO exercises in the North Atlantic and stopped in Halifax, Nova Scotia for Christmas 1979. During these operations, Skipjack survived a major North Atlantic hurricane that resulted in some loss of life among the NATO fleet with which she operated. After returning to her homeport of Groton in late February 1980 for a short time, she then deployed for further ASW exercises in February with the Atlantic Fleet and for her Mark 48 qualifications in the Caribbean stopping in Cocoa Beach, Florida (Cape Canaveral) and Roosevelt Roads, Puerto Rico. The remainder of the Spring of 1980 was spent in short ops and a short drydock refit in Groton.

In June 1980, Skipjack deployed to the Caribbean, the South Atlantic, and the South Pacific as part of UNITAS that year. During UNITAS, she engaged in ASW operations with ships of the Atlantic Fleet and from various South American Navies requiring she transit the Panama Canal into the Pacific and then return. She stopped in Port Everglades, Fl.(Ft. Lauderdale, Fl.); Roosevelt Roads, Puerto Rico; Rodman, Panama; Callao, Peru; Manta, Ecuador; Puerta La Cruz, Venezuela; Barbados; St. Kitts; and Curaçao. It was while operating in the Caribbean that Skipjack collided with an underwater mound. After an in-port inspection by divers and an official Navy inspection team sent down from Groton, she was allowed to complete her UNITAS run. However, because the mound was on sea charts, Commander Plath was removed from command and the run was completed by her new commanding officer Petersen.

After returning from UNITAS to Groton in September 1980, she spent the rest of the year in short ops and a refit including a short drydock in preparing for her transit to the Pacific Fleet for overhaul at Mare Island Naval Shipyard in Vallejo, CA. She left for the Pacific Fleet in early December, engaging in some ASW exercises along the way. During this transit she stopped in Fort Lauderdale and Rodman again and then at San Diego, CA before arriving at Mare Island in late January 1981. She spent the rest of 1981 and into 1982 in extensive overhaul at Mare Island.

In 1986, Skipjack deployed on a "Northern Run" to the North Atlantic Ocean.

In 1987 Skipjack deployed to the Mediterranean Sea, returning in early September and entering dry-dock for the September – November time frame. In early 1988, Skipjack visited St. Croix, Port Canaveral, Florida, Bermuda, and Halifax Harbour, Nova Scotia; the last two port calls conducted during an exercise. In late April, Skipjack departed Groton, traveling to the south. During this underway, sister diesel submarine USS Bonefish (SS-582) experienced a disastrous fire. TV news broadcast reports of the fire with film; however, news studio editors failed to identify the submarine televised. Wives of the Skipjack's crew noticed the sub bore strong resemblance to the Skipjack, leading many to believe it was the Skipjack suffering the casualty.

Skipjack had a change of command during the summer of 1988 and the crew prepared for a UNITAS cruise to South America. Skipjack left in September and visited the Naval Base in Puerto Rico; Caracas, Venezuela (anchored out); Cartagena, Colombia and then transited the Panama Canal. While at a Naval Base on the Pacific side, one motor-generator suffered an unrepairable casualty. Skipjack left UNITAS, re-transited the canal and headed to Groton, where she entered dry-dock for repairs.

Skipjack's authorization to dive expired in March 1989 since it was not cost efficient to inspect the hull in 1987 for a ship scheduled to be decommissioned. She had just been to St. Croix and some of the return trip was conducted on the surface. From March thru June, Skipjack provided bridge training to students at the Submarine Officer Basic School in Groton, mostly running up and down the river. During one trip out of the sound the anchor got stuck. Divers were called out from Groton to cut the anchor chain and retrieve the anchor. Skipjack entered dry-dock for the third time in three years to have the anchor fixed, at a cost of about $75K. Skipjack left Groton in early July to transit to Norfolk. After arrival Skipjack provided support vessel services for another submarine's sea trials. Following this mission, Skipjack entered NNSDDCO in October for decommissioning.

== Decommissioning in 1990 ==
Skipjack was decommissioned and stricken from the Naval Vessel Register on 19 April 1990, having served for 31 years in the US Navy. ex-Skipjack entered the Nuclear Powered Ship and Submarine Recycling Program in Bremerton, Washington, on 17 March 1996. Recycling was completed on 1 September 1998.

== Awards ==
- Navy Unit Commendation
- Navy E Ribbon (4 awards)
- Navy Expeditionary Medal
- National Defense Service Medal
