= February 1987 nor'easter =

Winter storm in the United States

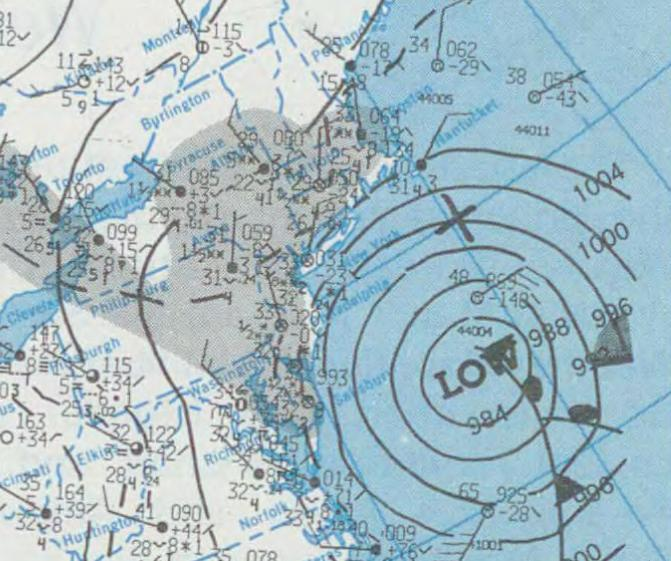
- A surface weather analysis of the nor'easter

Category 2 "Minor" winter storm
- Regional snowfall index: 5.53 (NOAA)

The February 1987 nor'easter was a significant winter storm in the US that impacted the Mid-Atlantic States around the end of the month. It delivered 8–12 hours of heavy, wet snowfall to several states from West Virginia to New York between February 22 and February 24. The storm was preceded by relatively warm temperatures and followed by a period of similar warmth, causing the snow to rapidly melt. The mild conditions were the result of a moderate anticyclone over the region that deteriorated as the nor'easter approached. Cold air damming likely took place prior to the storm's formation.

The nor'easter evolved from a complex series of low pressure areas. Eventually, the multiple center consolidated and a primary cyclone took hold along the Carolina coast. This low rapidly strengthened as it tracked northeastward. Upon reaching the Maryland coast, it turned more towards the east and intensified further to attain a minimum barometric pressure of 964 millibars by 1800 UTC on February 23. The heaviest precipitation, occasionally accompanied by thunder and lightning, along with gusty winds, occurred between 0000 and 1800 UTC.

Snowfall accumulations exceeding 10 in (25 cm) were reported across eastern West Virginia, northern Virginia, north-central Maryland, northern Delaware, southern Pennsylvania, central and southern New Jersey, and Long Island. Most of the interior Northeast was spared a substantial impact from the storm. However, lighter totals extended as far north as central Massachusetts.

The weight of the wet snow caused extensive damage to trees and power lines, and hundreds of thousands were reportedly left without power. At Washington, D.C., 11 in (28 cm) of snow fell, resulting in widespread effects. Limited states of emergency were declared in certain areas.

MV Balsa 24, a 345-foot (105 m) long freighter, was lost on February 25, 1987 after it capsized in the storm. Eighteen sailors were killed and there was 1 survivor, who was rescued by the nuclear submarine USS Scamp (SSN-588). Fishing vessel Delores Marie was also lost, killing 3.

== See also ==
- Climate of the United States
