= Teardrop hull =

Submarine hull design

A teardrop hull is a submarine hull design which emphasizes submerged performance over surfaced performance. It was somewhat commonly used in the early stages of submarine development, but was gradually abandoned in the early 20th century in favour of designs optimized for high performance on the surface as a result of changes in operational doctrine. Although naval doctrine changed, design practices remained until the later parts of World War II when the German Kriegsmarine suffered ever-growing losses of submarines in the Battle of the Atlantic.

In an attempt to combat the growing threat of allied anti-submarine efforts, experimental design concepts dating back to the late interbellum were shoehorned into the existing submarine design process, resulting in a small number of hydrogen peroxide-powered submarines as well as the Elektroboot family of diesel-electric submarine classes. Although too late and too few to turn the war around, examination of these boats in the immediate post-war period heavily disrupted the institutional inertia which had kept the navies of the world focused on the "diving torpedo boat" in the previous decades, and led to an increased focus on submerged performance. This led to the eventual reintroduction of the teardrop hull in submarines, being employed in various forms on virtually all large undersea military vessels today.

== History ==
Because the term refers not to any exact shape, but rather to the abstract concept of a hull shape optimized for underwater travel, and more specifically the physical manifestation of this idea in actual submarines as limited by material sciences and the design requirements placed upon the vessel, whether or not any specific vessel exhibits a teardrop hull depends on the subjective interpretation of the term itself. Depending on this interpretation, several of the submarines shown below may be considered to have been a "first attempt" or a "milestone" of some description.

A collection of submarines arranged in roughly chronological order to show the progression of submarine hull design.

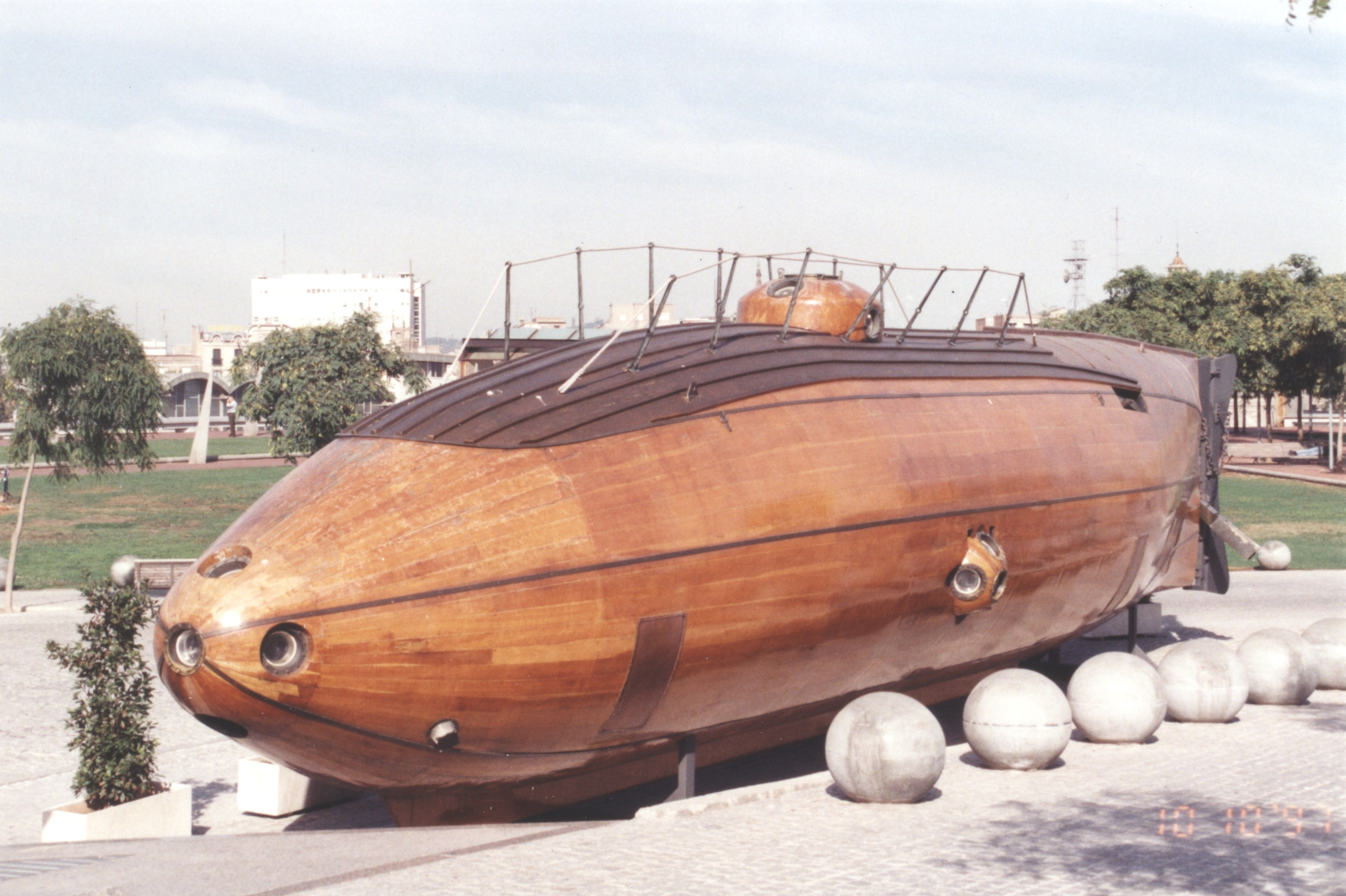
This replica of the Ictíneo II of the mid-to-late 1860s may represent one of the earliest attempts at a hull shape optimized for underwater travel.

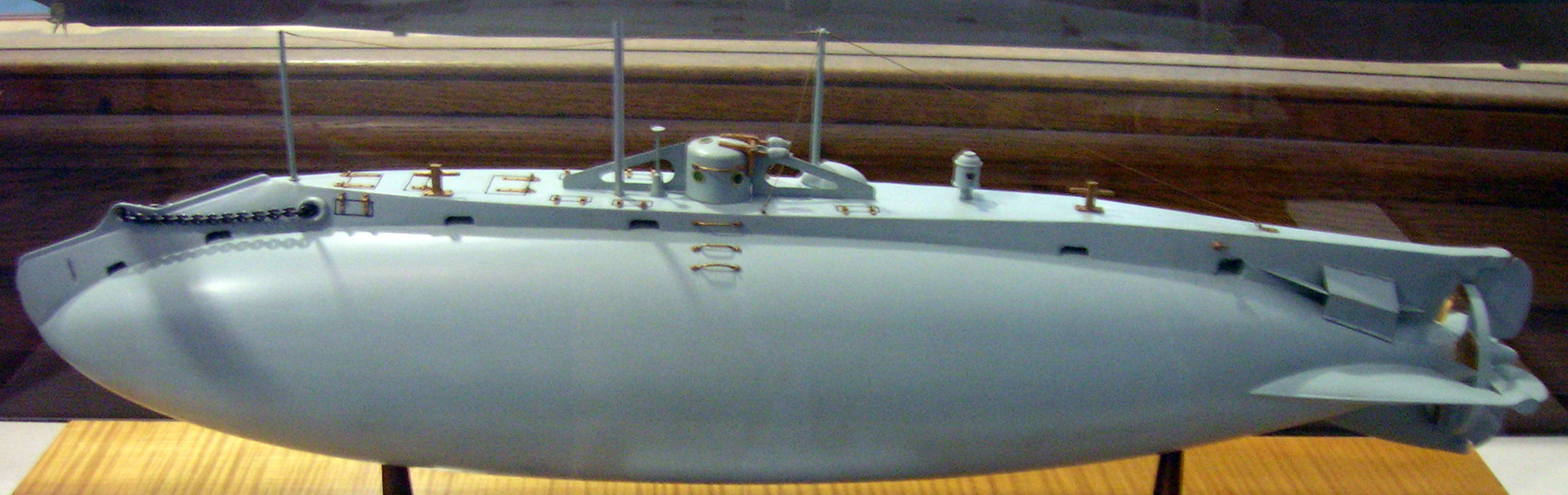
A model of one of John Phillip Holland's designs from the late 19th or early 20th century, showing a very clean hull and relatively modern rudder arrangement.

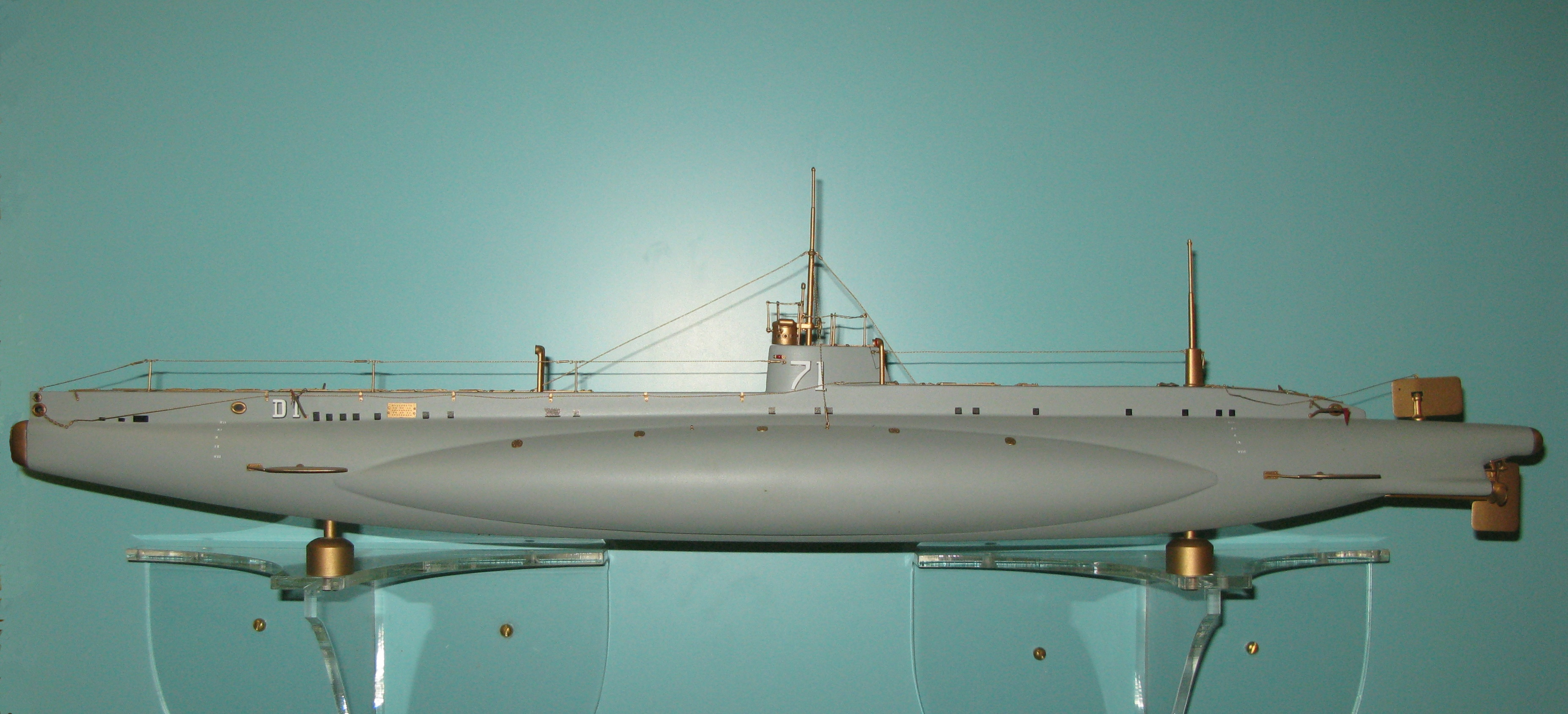
Less than 10 years after HMS Holland 1 entered service, the British B-class submarine shows the transition in hull form from submarine to diving surface vessel. The bow is slightly raised, as is the stern above the two propellers.

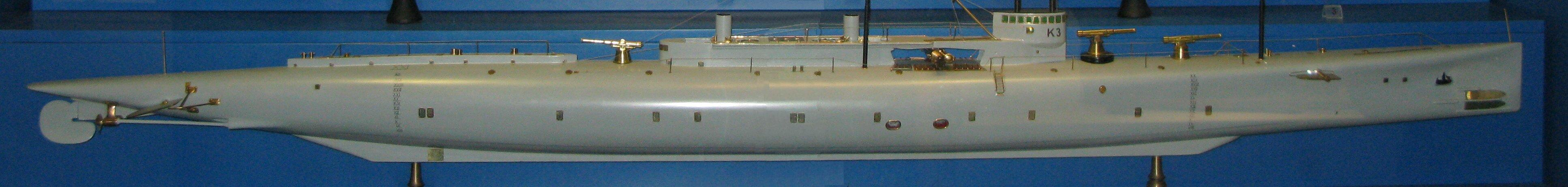
Entering service in 1917, the steam-powered British K-class may be seen as the peak of surface-optimized submarines in WWI. They achieved 24 kn (44 km/h) and in an emergency could submerge in just shy of five minutes, although a half hour was a more reasonable timeframe in normal operation. 103 m long, and with an estimated maximum diving depth of 61 m, they were 4 m short of being able to reach their crush depth without leaving the surface. Combined with an extreme turning radius, poor submerged depth control, and a habit of shipping water through the boiler funnels, it is no wonder that they gained the reputation of "K for Kalamity", with several boats being lost to flooding of the boiler rooms, collisions, reaching crush depth, and one being recorded as having sunk itself, without human assistance, at its mooring in the middle of the night.

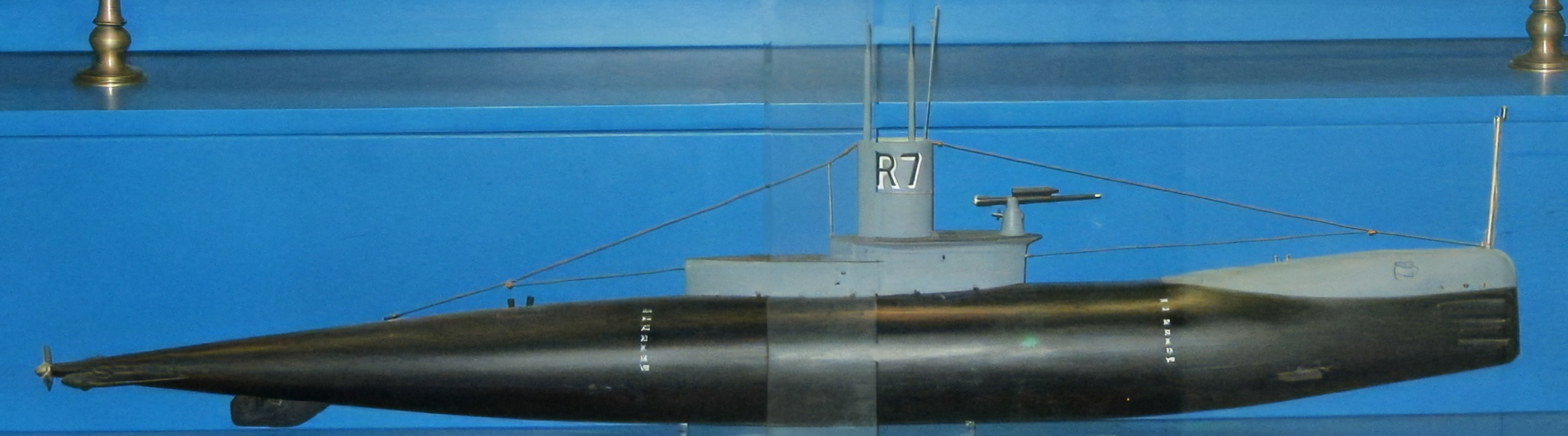
The world's first hunter-killers, the British R-class submarine of 1918 was a drastic return to the concept of the high-speed undersea warship. Made to hunt enemy submarines, they featured extensive streamlining, a virtually nonexistent casing, and the ability to make 14 kn (26 km/h) for a full hour. Only the knife-like bow shape betrays the expectation of the designer that these boats would not operate continuously submerged, only breaking the surface to charge their batteries. They were instead to transit slowly on the surface using their diesel engine, only submerging once they reached their patrol areas.

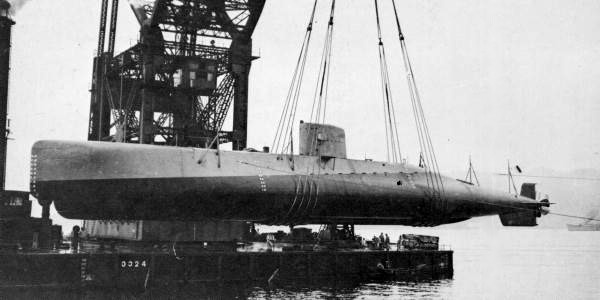
Unrelated to the later German Elektroboot program, the Japanese Submarine no. 71 was launched in 1937 and achieved just over 21 kn (39 km/h) submerged, a feat only exceeded by japan's smaller Ko-hyoteki midget submarines at the time, until the German V-80, powered by hydrogen peroxide, achieved 28 kn (52 km/h) during testing 1940-1941.

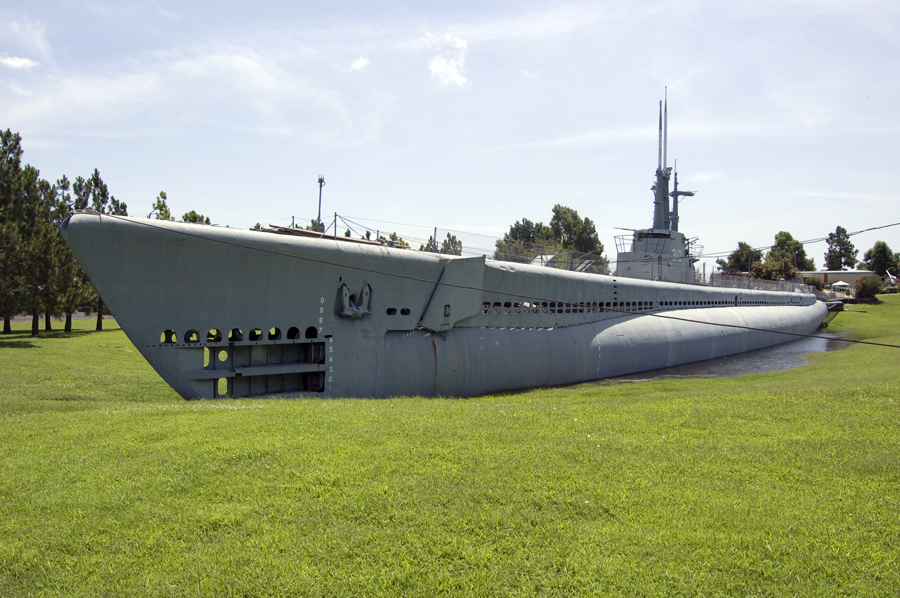
Universally optimized for surface cruising, most submarines used in the second world war featured high, somewhat flared bows, as well as propeller and rudder arrangements similar to that of a contemporary cruiser, albeit with an extra set of rudders for depth and pitch control. Here a US Navy Balao-class Fleet Submarine from the early 1940s converted to a museum.

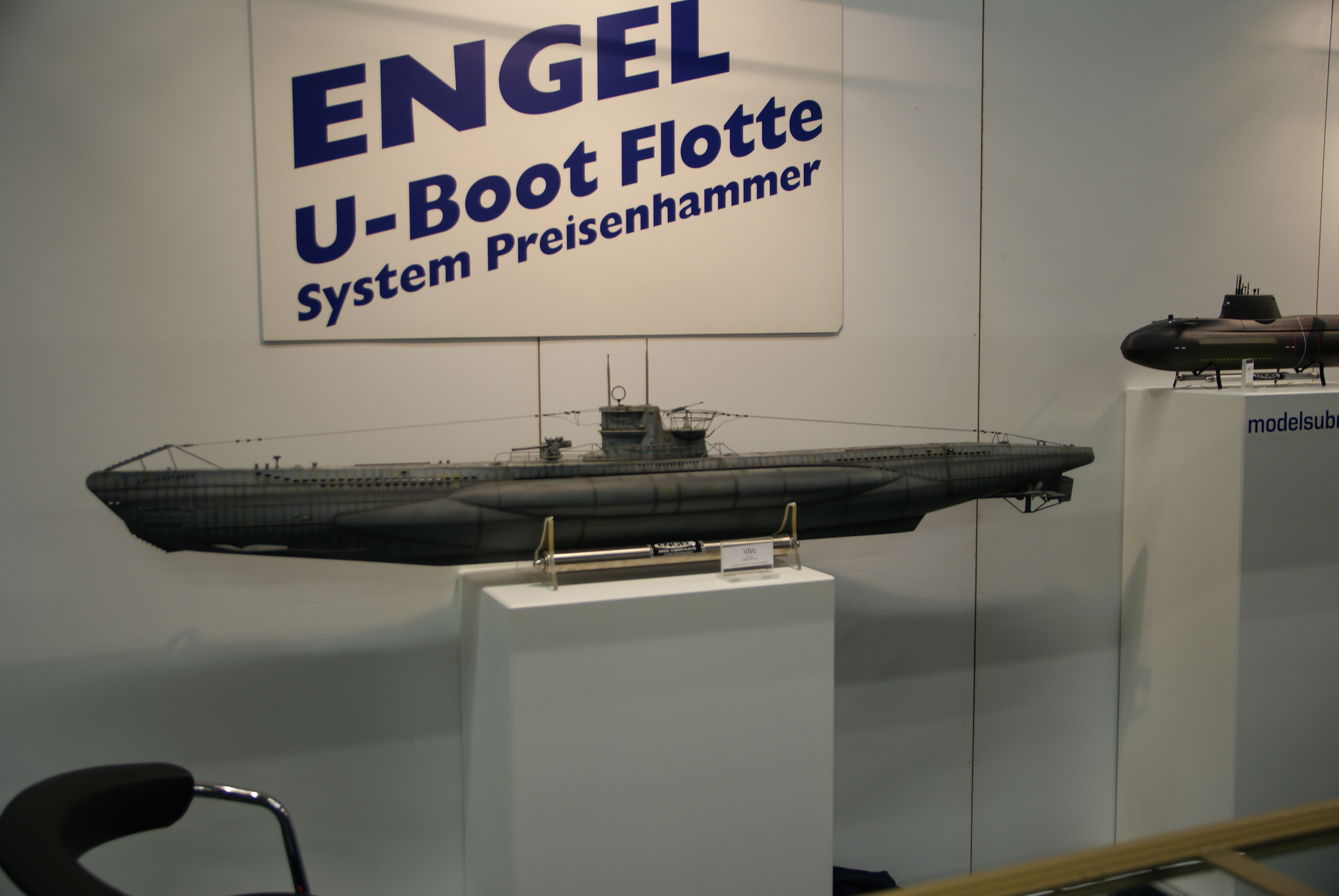
German boats, such as this Type VII, featured an overall appearance similar to the Balao, while being substantially smaller (~750 tonnes as opposed to ~1500). The model clearly shows the submarine's pressure hull, its forward and aft ends being enclosed in the lighter casing which contain the boat's forward and aft main ballast tanks. The long cigar-shaped bulge along the submarine's upper side is an external fuel tank. Entering service in 1936–37, the Type VII and the larger Type IX both followed the same "diving torpedo boat" concept that had also spawned the American and British fleet boats and patrol submarines, and facing increasingly effective allied patrol vessels and aircraft, they were operationally obsolete by mid-1941 to 1942, yet remained the mainstay of the increasingly desperate German submarine force throughout the war.

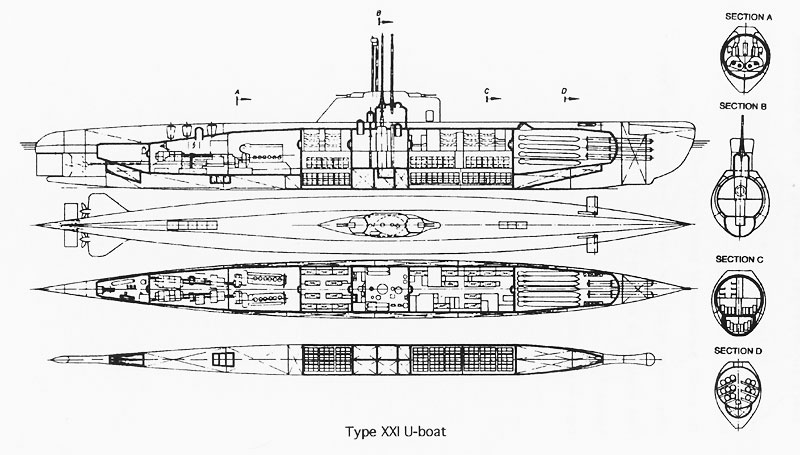
As steady improvements to allied anti-submarine warfare resulted in rapidly increasing German losses throughout the second half of WWII, attempts were made to build submarines with hydrogen peroxide turbine propulsion. While the turbine was far from ready to enter service, the submarines were shoehorned into production as regular diesel-electric boats with vastly increased battery capacity replacing the peroxide tanks. Although heavily streamlined, the hull of the late-war German Type XXI (21) remained influenced by previous designs, clearly being expected to operate on the surface in a limited capacity. Even so, it set a new standard for underwater speed, range, and detectability for submarines in the post-war world.

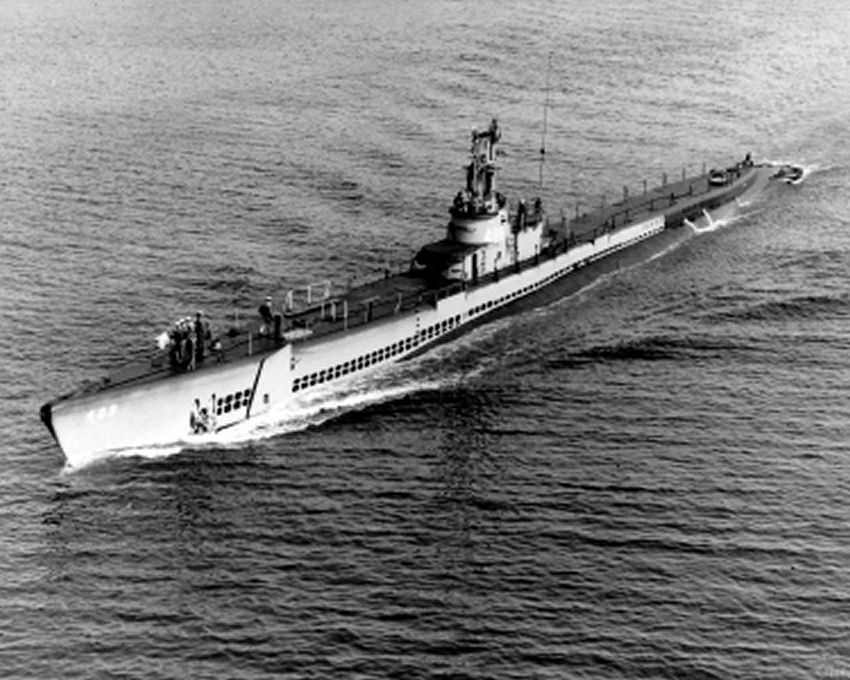
Due to neglect of the merchant navy in favour of increased numbers of large surface combatants, in part fueled by an American tendency to downplay the successes of their submarines and overstate the effectiveness of Japanese ASW efforts, the American "Silent Service" faced a comparatively tame Japanese resistance, resulting in great successes against the Japanese merchant fleet. Because of this, American fleet boats saw no serious improvement in overall design throughout the war, with emphasis instead being focused on technical details such as improvements to pressure hull strength and electronics eventually including quieter electric motors, as well as improvements to crew comfort for long patrols in the Pacific. Thus, American boats such as this Tench-class left the war looking almost indistinguishable from the classes which were in service at its start.

Entering production in 1950, the Soviet Project 613 patrol submarines were heavily influenced by the Type XXI. The deck gun and anti-aircraft autocannon turret were absent on later versions. Although heavily streamlined, like the Type XXI its design made concessions to surfaced operation such as the sharp knife-like bow and stern.

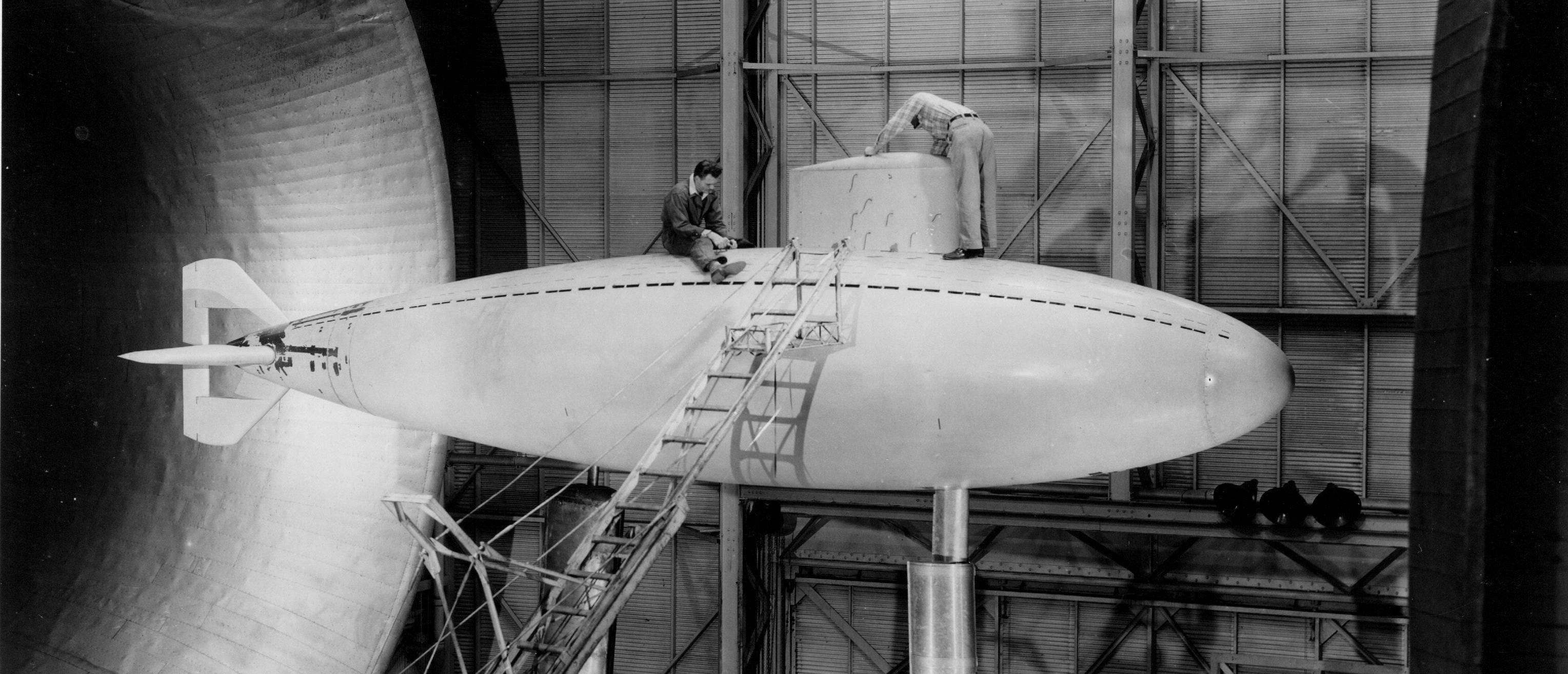
A scale model of the USS Albacore undergoing wind-tunnel testing. Apart from the rudder arrangements at its stern and the sail, its general shape is similar to that of the Ictineo II despite the designs being separated by nearly a century.

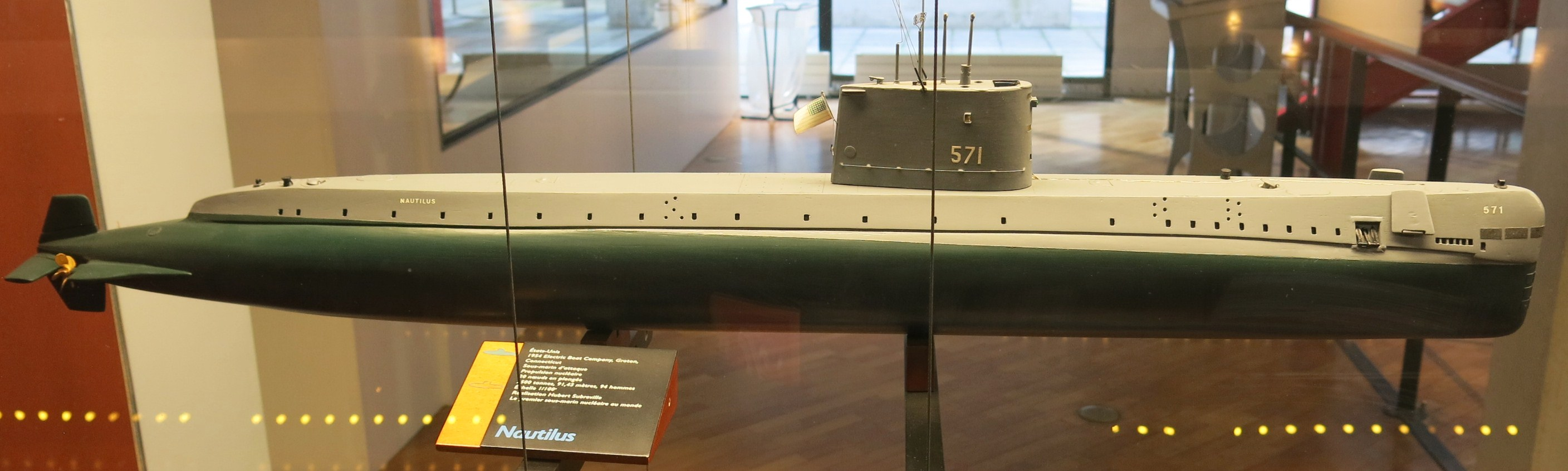
The world's first nuclear submarine, the USS Nautilus (SSN-571) of 1954, shows a very clean stern section, while the bow is clearly to some extent inspired by the Type XXI. Her test depth of 210 m was comparable to the German boat, but at 23 kn (43 km/h) submerged she was faster by far, even faster than any previous US fleet boat had been on the surface. Unfortunately, serious design flaws in her bow and sail resulted in extreme vibrations at high speed, and worsened over time. At the end of her life 4 kn (7 km/h) was enough to deafen her sonar, and the noise drastically increased the risk of detection.

Commissioned on 17 January 1959, the Soviet Union's first SSN, of the Project 627-class, reached 30 kn (56 km/h) with a test depth of 300 m. As different from the Nautilus as was possible while still being both a submarine, nuclear powered, and useful as combat vessels, they featured a far more efficient bow and sail shape while still showing the fish-tail of the Type XXI, and where the Nautilus used a nuclear reactor, the Soviet boats mounted two in tandem. Apart from improved hydrodynamics, the rounded bow shape also provided plenty of room for a very large sonar array above the torpedo tubes.

Commissioned less than three months after the first Project 627, the USS Skipjack was the first combat vessel in the US Navy to use a "pure" teardrop hull since it was abandoned almost half a century earlier. Because of the high cost of forging large sections of pressure hull in complex shapes, following boats have incrementally "strayed" from this design.

One of several new Soviet submarine classes entering service in 1967, the Project 671 was among the first mainline Soviet submarine classes to replace the fish-tail with the more torpedo-like shape that has become as a sign of emphasis on underwater performance.

As the Project 611 (Zulu) and Project 641 (Foxtrot) approached obsolescence, the early 1970s saw the USSR beginning construction of a series of 18 Project 641b -class boats. These inherited the three-screw knife-tail arrangement that had been carried down through the 641 from the 611, and which originated in the Type XXI. In stark contrast to their outdated propulsion layout, they were fitted with anechoic tiles and sonar equipment similar to that used by contemporary Soviet nuclear attack submarines.

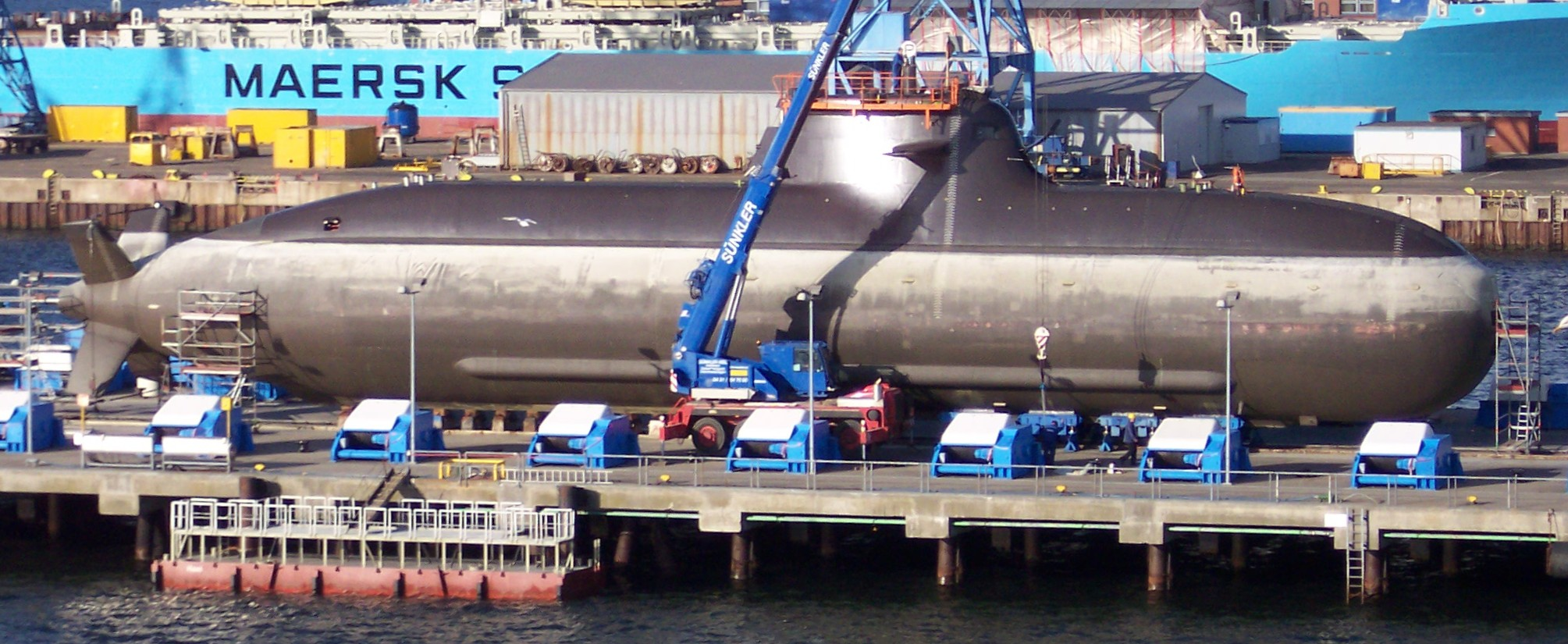
This German Type 212 submarine uses a single hull along part of its length, but is double-hulled throughout its rear half to provide safe stowage space outside the pressure hull for the hydrogen tanks used by its fuel cell-based air-independent-propulsion.

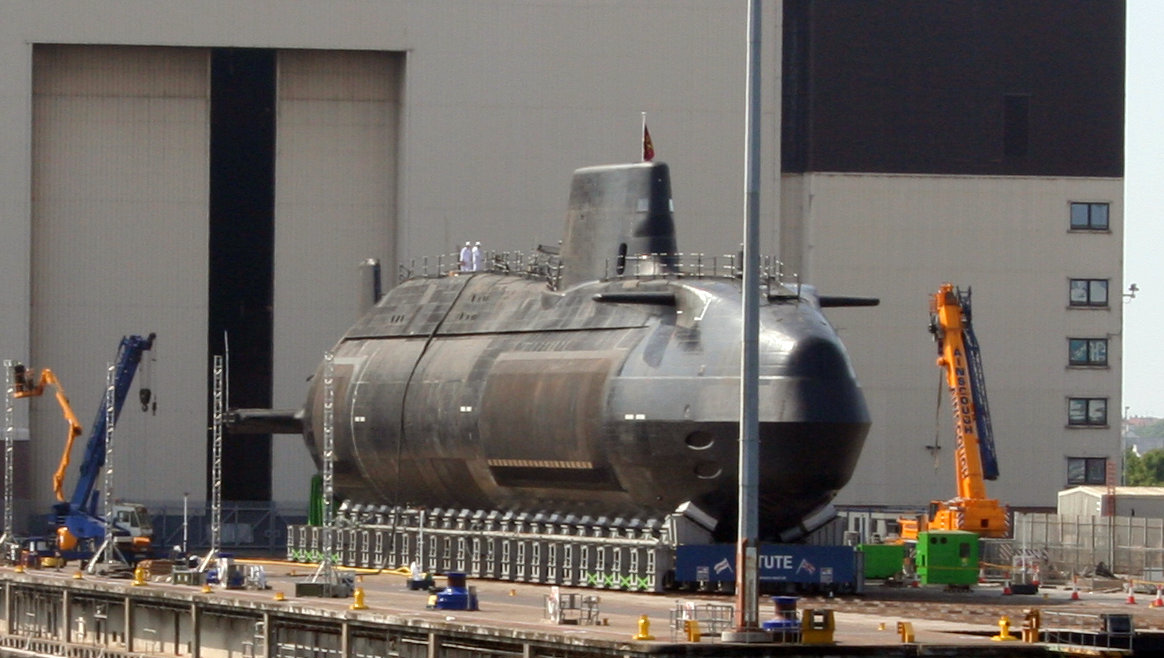
On the way to her launch in the late 2000s or 2010s, this Astute-class vessel clearly shows the compromise made by most modern western designs. Instead of completely optimizing the hull for submerged performance, hydrodynamically efficient bow and stern sections made from thinner and more easily shaped steel are welded to the front and rear ends of a constant-diameter pressure hull. Such designs are almost inherently modular as new hull sections can comparatively cheaply and easily be inserted anywhere along the pressure hull's length to provide additional space and weight capacity without seriously impacting the hydrodynamic performance of the design.

== In modern use ==
Although the overarching theme of the teardrop hull is that of maximizing submerged performance at the cost of surfaced performance, the exact outcome of this process depends on several factors, in no specific order as the order of importance of these concerns is in itself variable:

- The size of the submarine, being a function of the requirements placed upon by the designer in terms of operational endurance, weapons capacity and fitted sensors.
- The arrangement of external and internal equipment.
- Economic factors, primarily related to the expensive process of designing, shaping, and assembling hull sections with 3D curves, and then fitting machinery inside.

=== Single or double hull ===
Starting with the end of WWII, western and eastern submarines were overall similar, being double or partial double-hull designs with large fuel and ballast tanks between the inner and outer hulls as reserving large volumes inside the pressure hulls for the storage of pressure-insensitive fuel was seen as uneconomical. The use of double hulls allows for a large degree of freedom in shaping a boat's exterior and permits room for insensitive equipment to be placed outside the pressure hull, thus allowing a smaller pressure hull and, by extension, a smaller boat. It does however carry with it a high construction and maintenance cost.

Nuclear boats, by virtue of their propulsion system, have little use for this in-between space, and are thus more likely to either use single hulls or, as was the case for soviet submarines, use the "free" space for expanded ballast tanks and equipment. Because of this, western nuclear submarines tend to appear as long tubes closed off by the bow and stern, while eastern nuclear submarines tend to have an overall more hydrodynamically efficient shape and extreme amounts of reserve buoyancy, with some numbers suggesting a reserve buoyancy fraction of >45% for the Project 941 (Shark)-class SSBN. There also exists an option for a hydrodynamically optimized single hull nuclear submarine such as the Skipjack-class, but creating large 3D-curved plates out of thick, high-strength metal remains prohibitively expensive.

=== Bow shape ===
Apart from the choice between single and double hulls, there are also several choices relating to the placement of sonar equipment, torpedo tubes, and the forward dive planes. In smaller coastal boats, typically with two decks inside the pressure hull, locating the torpedo tubes and torpedo handling room on the lower deck with the sonar mounted higher up in the bow, potentially above the waterline as on German Type 206 and Swedish Sjöormen, Västergötland, and more recent classes, offers easy access to the sonar for maintenance. Another option is to place the torpedo room on the upper deck with the array in the lower half of the bow as on the British Upholder-class and the Soviet/Russian Kilo, which leaves space behind the bow for large battery banks, and may allow easier restocking of torpedoes by loading them through the upper torpedo tubes instead of through a dedicated torpedo loading hatch. Both of these options tend to result in somewhat blunt bows, and the former option may require moving the forward dive planes from the hull up to the sail so as to reduce flow noise that might otherwise disturb the sonar.

As size increases, the greater beam of the boat allows for the use of angled torpedo tubes firing through the sides of the hull while leaving room in the bow for a much larger sonar array. This is the option chosen for many US nuclear submarines since the middle of the cold war, and is also employed on the new Russian Yasen-class boats. As before, the drive to minimize flow noise may encourage moving the forward dive planes to the sail, but this may be a disadvantage when surfacing through the arctic ice, requiring reinforcements and high-angle tilting mechanisms to prevent bending of the planes. A more complex solution is to replicate the German Type XXI by folding the forward dive planes flush into the hull when not in use, preferably using an additional set of doors to cover the opening in the hull sides. A third option commonly used by the British is to simply leave the forward dive planes on the upper part of the bow permanently, occasionally with the ability to fold upward so as to not foul harbour structures, and reshape the bow at the dive plane's point of attachment so as to create the least possible amount of turbulence.

=== Propulsion and stern control surfaces ===
In terms of propulsion, western submarines of this type end in a single propeller so as to minimize drag; the Soviet navy was slower to adopt this practice, their designs continuing to use two propellers to provide either greater power or safety. The Type 206 has a long, fine taper abaft the sail, again to minimize drag, but the British Upholder class has a more economical design, having a short taper at the extreme aft of the hull so as to maximize internal volume, and perhaps provide greater strength to the hull. The German Type VII submarine pictured on this page has the aft of her hull tapering abruptly for this purpose, though its propeller axis follows that of the rest of the hull.

The Albacore studied several positions of the afterplanes. American designers settled on a modified version of the Delphin's cruciform arrangement (a Greek cross viewed from behind); they rejected the alternative of an x-arrangement for its complexity, but it was accepted and used by the Dutch, Swedish, Australian and German navies among others, for its ability to snuggle closer to a shallow seabed without striking the rudder on the sea floor. The Soviets often repeated a conventional arrangement, similar to that of the Type XXI U-boat.

== The "Albacore hull" ==
On the first of August 1953, the US launched an experimental vessel, Albacore, which featured a hull shape largely based on the "Lyon Shape" named for Hilda Lyon. Following successful maneuvering trials and tests of various rudder and propeller arrangements, the same overall hull shape was used for the Skipjack- and Barbel-classes, and most modern US submarines today use a variation of that shape with a central extended cylinder constituting the main pressure hull. Because of the large amount of attention paid to the Albacore in the time before the dawn of the internet made information on the subject of submarine history more accessible to the general public, it is likely that any design which at all resembles it may be referred to as an "Albacore hull", regardless of whether it was inspired by Albacore, was developed independently at a similar moment in time, or predated Albacore outright.
