= W. W. Behrens Jr. =

United States admiral (1922–1986)

William Wohlsen Behrens Jr.
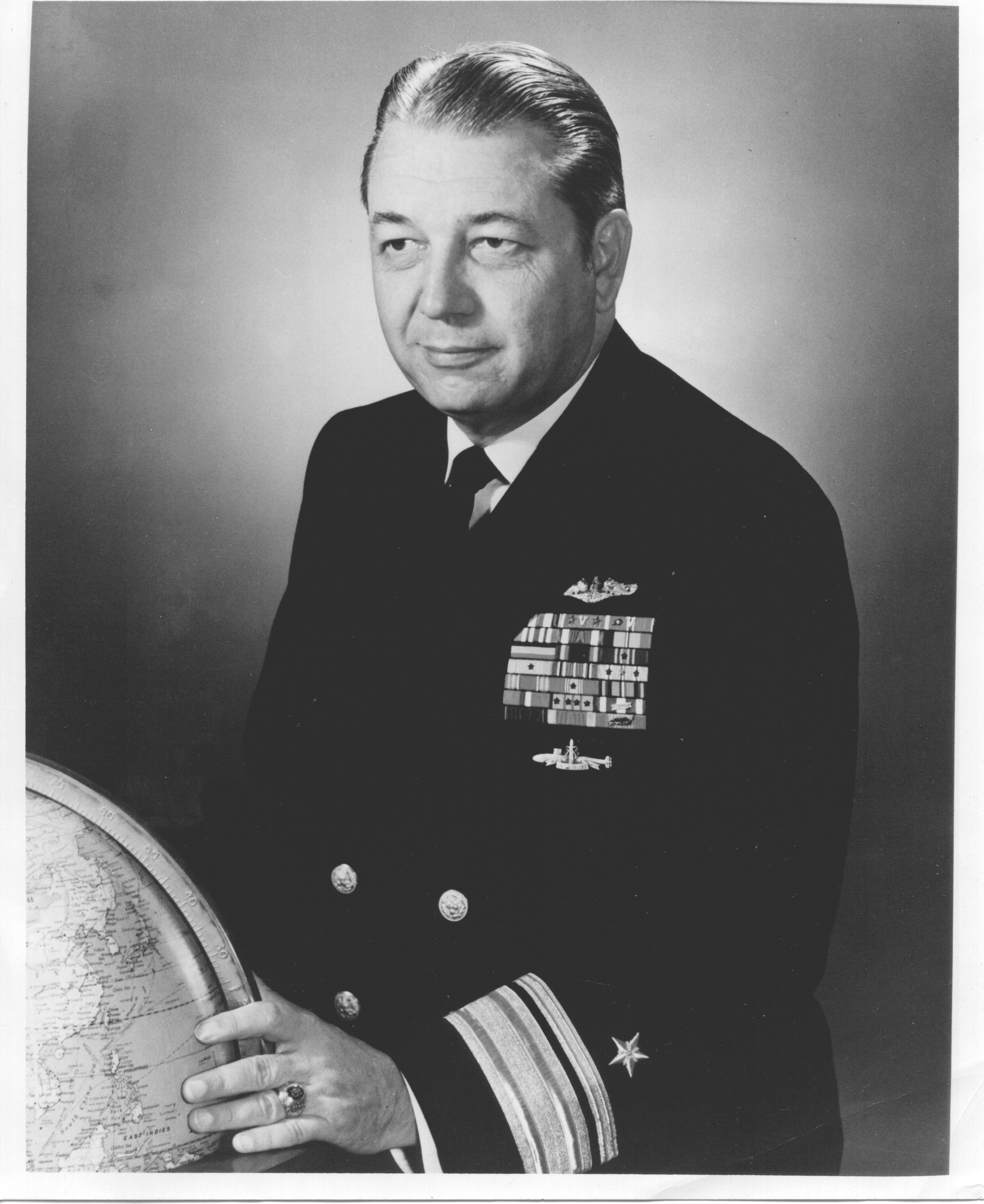
- William Wohlsen Behrens Jr.
- Born: September 14, 1922; Newport, Rhode Island, U.S.
- Died: January 21, 1986 (aged 63)
- Military career
- Allegiance: United States
- Branch: United States Navy
- Service years: 1943–1973
- Rank: Vice Admiral
- Commands: USS Balao (SS-285); USS Harder (SS-568); USS Skipjack (SSN-585); USS Ethan Allen (SSBN-608)
- Conflicts: World War II; Vietnam War
- Awards: Navy Distinguished Service Medal; Silver Star; Bronze Star Medal (2); Legion of Merit (5); Vietnam Presidential Unit Citation; Meritorious Unit Citation (Vietnam); Gallantry Cross (Vietnam)

Vice Admiral William Wohlsen Behrens Jr. (September 14, 1922 – January 21, 1986) was an American naval officer and oceanographer who was instrumental in establishing the National Oceanic and Atmospheric Administration.

== Biography ==
Behrens was born at Newport, Rhode Island, the son of Rear Admiral (then Lieutenant) William W. Behrens Sr. and Nellie Vasey Behrens. He graduated from Friends Select Academy in Philadelphia, from Rutherford Preparatory School in Long Beach, California and then from the United States Naval Academy in the class of 1944 (graduated early in June 1943), where he attended via a presidential appointment.

=== 1940s ===
Behrens graduated from the Submarine School, New London, Connecticut, in 1943, and was assigned to the Sand Lance (SS-381) as gunnery officer, for two war patrols, and was awarded Presidential Unit Citation. He was then assigned to the Picuda (SS-382), as a communications and engineer officer, on four war patrols, and was awarded Navy Unit Citation, Silver Star, Bronze Star with "V", with personal citations for "conspicuous gallantry and intrepidity". He was credited with conceiving electronic slip rings allowing for continuous, non-reversing trainability of submarine sonar, as well as developing the first short form code for use in submarine "wolfpack" communications.

From July 1946 to August 1948 he was assigned to the Quillback (SS-424) as engineer officer. From September 1948 to March 1950 to the Clamagore (SS-343) as executive officer, operations officer and navigator. He was awarded a Navy "E".

Behrens was then the project officer for the navy's first underwater telephone (UQC-1) for voice communications between ships and submerged submarines. Then he was project officer for first U.S. scanning sonar (QHB-1).

=== 1950s ===
From 1950 to 1952, he was at the U.S. Fleet Sonar School, as an ASW instructor and officer in charge in the C Pro-Submarine Sonar Instruction Section; from 1952 to 1953, he was assigned to the Odax (SS-484) as executive officer and navigator, again being awarded a Navy "E". From 1953 to 1954 he was assigned to the Balao (SS-285) as commanding officer and received another Navy "E"; from 1954 to 1955, he was assigned to the Harder (SS-568) as commanding officer; and in 1955, he was assigned to the U.S. Submarine School as head of the Engineering Department. He began a study of nuclear physics and engineering.

From 1955 to 1957, he was director of the first Nuclear Power School, and acquired a qualified faculty, where he wrote curricula for both officer and enlisted courses and set requirements for operation of nuclear reactors under rigid guidelines later adopted by the U.S. Atomic Energy Commission (AEC).

From March 1957 to December 1957, he was at the Naval Reactors Branch, AEC, and was Special Advisor to the Chief, Naval Reactors, Admiral Hyman G. Rickover. He then completed nuclear physics study through the doctorate level and qualified as Nuclear Reactor Operator, License Number 5.

From 1958 to December 1960, he was assigned to Construction and Commissioning, Command of the Skipjack (SSN-585), the first modern submarine (designed from the keel up with improved marine nuclear reactor, fast attack, whale shaped, sail diving planes, high test steel, true submersible). Again he was awarded a Navy "E" and the Navy Unit Citation as well as the Legion of Merit Award for "completion of a mission of great value to the United States."

=== 1960s ===
From January 1961 to March 1961 he was at the Guided Missile School, Dam Neck, Virginia in the Polaris Command Course. From March 1961 to May 1963 he was assigned to the Ethan Allen (SSBN-608) as commanding officer (Gold) and again awarded a Navy "E". From 1963 to 1964 he attended the National War College as a student. His dissertation there was Nuclear Power for the U.S. Merchant Marine. Behrens also attended George Washington University, where he was awarded an MA degree in international affairs.

From August 1964 to January 1966 he was OpNav, NATO Nuclear Force Plans, Office of Strategic Plans. He received another Navy Unit Commendation (star for second award) for service aboard the USS Claude V. Ricketts (DDG-5), a NATO multi-national manned ship for "planning to identify NATO nuclear force requirements and in his coordination with participating governments".

In 1966 he was nominated by Secretary of Defense and chosen by the Secretary of State for assignment to the Policy Planning Council, Department of State, with rank of Deputy Assistant Secretary of State with additional duty with the National Security Council staff from January 1966 to August 1967. Additionally, he developed Fish protein concentrate and the legislation which was adopted to finance Fish Protein Concentrate factories in Southeast Asia and Latin America with the pilot program in Washington. In June 1967, he was selected for promotion to rear admiral.

From 1967 to 1969, he was assigned to COMPHIBGRU ONE and COM PHIBFORSEVENTH FLT, where he served as commander (this command was composed of approximately 65 ships, including two LPH carriers with embarked Marine Landing Force Battalions). In this capacity, he served in 28 Vietnam amphibious operations, including the longest (Tet 1968) and the largest (January 1969) with both army division and air force support flights. He received the Legion of Merit (his 3rd award) with Combat V, the Bronze Star with Army Oak Leaf Cluster (second award), and was three times decorated by Vietnamese government with the Presidential Unit Citation, Meritorious Unit Citation, and Gallantry Cross.

In July 1969, he was appointed Director, Politico-Military Policy and was awarded his fourth Legion of Merit.

=== 1970s ===
In September 1970 he was Oceanographer of the Navy, with collateral duty as Federal Coordinator for Ocean Mapping and Prediction. He then worked on the establishment of the National Oceanic and Atmospheric Agency (NOAA) within the Department of Commerce as well as service on international and on various Oceanographic committees – including the initiation of talks on law of the sea, and as a presidential speechwriter on oceanographic policy.

Admiral Behrens was awarded a doctor of science degree (DSci) by Gettysburg College, Gettysburg, Pennsylvania in 1971.

He was the author of U.S. policy The Treasure of the Deep Ocean is the Property of all Mankind. He also worked with United Nations environmental committees. For this service he was awarded his fifth Legion of Merit.

In 1972 he served as deputy administrator of NOAA. During August 1973, he received medical retirement with 100 percent disability and was awarded the Distinguished Service Medal and the permanent rank of vice admiral, United States Navy.

== Later career ==
From 1974 to 1975 he worked at J. Watson Noah Associates, Inc., Falls Church, Virginia, as a corporate vice president; from 1975 to 1976 at Wheeler Industries, Washington, D.C., as a science advisor. In 1975, he co-founded Services National Bank, Arlington, Virginia.

In 1976, he was appointed by the State of Florida to establish the Florida Institute of Oceanography under the Board of Regents. He acquired a 110-foot (34 m) vessel for conversion to a research ship, refitted a 60-foot (18 m) research vessel and set up the coordinating structure for oceanographic instruction and research at all Florida universities through the graduate level.

He then established guidelines for acquisition of contracts in oceanographic research with cooperative participation by contributing universities and initiated the oceanographic programs for community colleges and secondary schools, with "at sea" time donated by the university research vessels.

As a Bioneering Professional Engineer (nuclear), he authored many professional articles and journals.

He was a member of the Explorers Club of New York, New York Yacht Club, Army-Navy Club, Washington, D.C., Army & Navy Country Club, Arlington, Virginia, Rotary Club, the Florida Tiger Bay Club, the St. Petersburg Progress Club, among others.

== Family ==
Rear Admiral Behrens and Betty Ann Taylor Behrens of Tampa, Florida, were the parents of four children.

His son William W. Behrens III, was co-author, with Donella H. Meadows, Dennis L. Meadows and Jørgen Randers, of The Limits to Growth in 1972.
