= Skipjack-class submarine =

Early cold-war US nuclear attack submarine

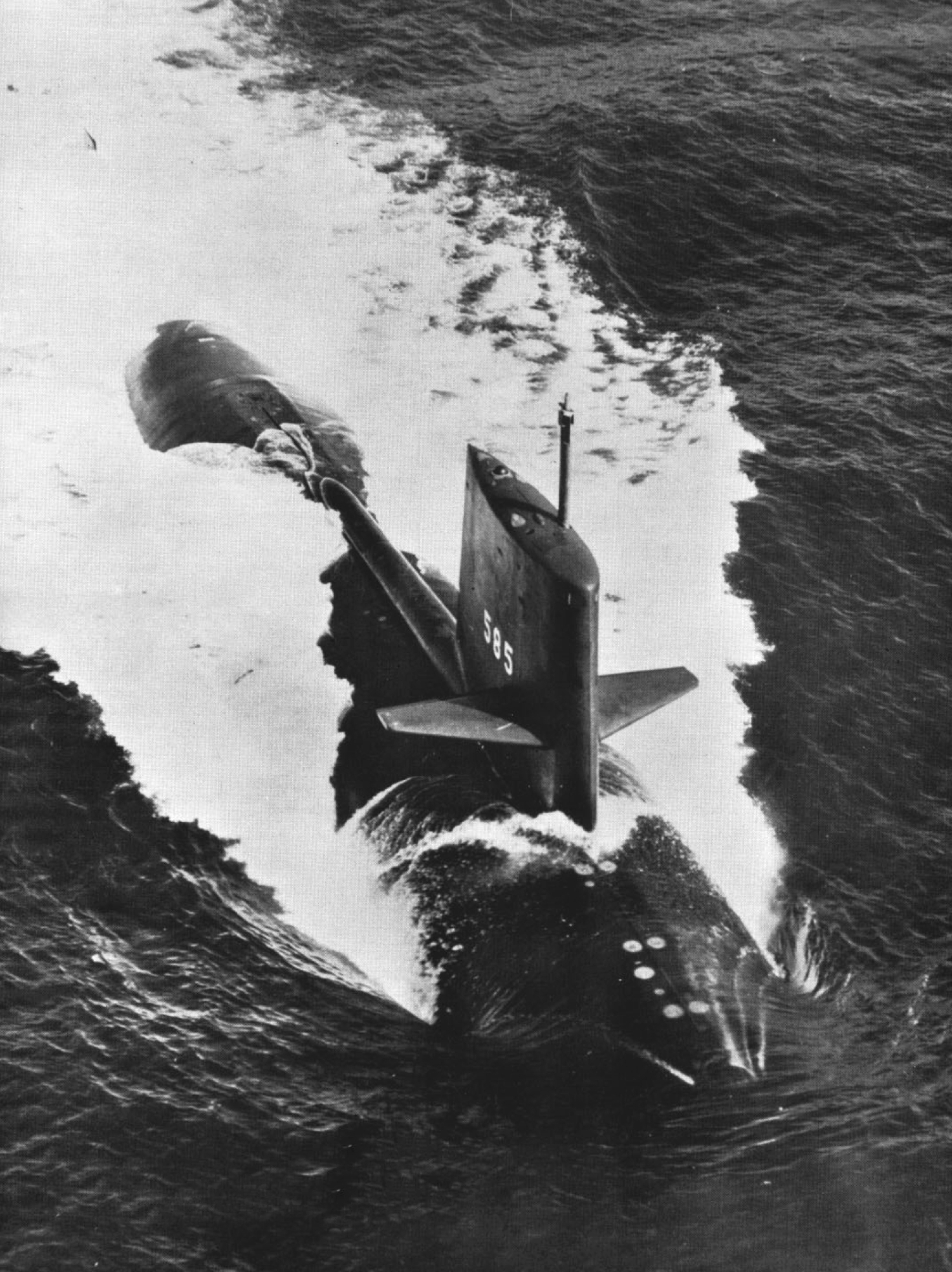
- USS Skipjack

Class overview
- Builders: General Dynamics Electric Boat; Mare Island Naval Shipyard; Ingalls Shipbuilding; Newport News Shipbuilding
- Operators: United States Navy
- Preceded by: Skate class
- Succeeded by: Permit class; USS Halibut
- Built: 1956–1961
- In commission: 1959–1990
- Completed: 6
- Lost: 1
- Retired: 5

General characteristics
- Type: Nuclear-powered fast attack submarine
- Displacement: Surfaced: 3,075 long tons (3,124 t); Submerged: 3,513 long tons (3,569 t)
- Length: 251 ft 8 in (76.71 m)
- Beam: 31 ft 7.75 in (9.6457 m)
- Propulsion: 1 S5W reactor, geared steam turbines (15,000 shp (11,000 kW)), 1 shaft
- Speed: 15 knots (28 km/h; 17 mph) surfaced; 33 knots (61 km/h; 38 mph) submerged
- Range: unlimited except by food.
- Test depth: 700 ft (210 m)
- Complement: 93
- Armament: 6 × 21-inch (533 mm) torpedo tubes (bow); 24 × Mark 37 torpedoes, Mark 14 torpedoes, Mark 16 torpedoes, Mark 45 ASTOR nuclear torpedoes, and/or Mark 48 torpedoes.

The Skipjack class was a class of six United States Navy nuclear submarines (SSNs) that entered service from 1959 to 1961. This class was named after its lead boat, USS Skipjack. The new class introduced the teardrop hull and the S5W reactor to U.S. nuclear submarines. The Skipjacks were the fastest U.S. nuclear submarines until the Los Angeles-class submarines, the first of which entered service in 1974.

== Design ==
Profile, USS Skipjack

The Skipjacks' design (project SCB 154) was based on the USS Albacore's high-speed hull design. The hull and innovative internal arrangement were similar to the diesel-powered Barbel class that were built concurrently. The design of the Skipjacks was very different from the Skate-class submarines that preceded the Skipjacks. Unlike the Skates, this new design was maximized for underwater speed by fully streamlining the hull like a blimp. This required a single screw aft of the rudders and stern planes. Adoption of a single screw was a matter of considerable debate and analysis within the Navy, as two shafts offered redundancy and improved maneuverability. The so-called "body-of-revolution hull" reduced her surface sea-keeping, but was essential for underwater performance. Also like Albacore, the Skipjacks used HY-80 high-strength steel, with a yield strength of 80,000 psi (550 MPa), although this was not initially used to increase the diving depth relative to other US submarines. HY-80 remained the standard submarine steel through the Los Angeles class.

Control room of Skipjack class; the bow is at the top.

Another Barbel-like innovation was the combination of the conning tower, control room, and attack center in one space. This was continued in all subsequent US nuclear submarines. Combining the functions in one space was facilitated by the adoption of "push-button" ballast control, another feature of Albacore. Previous designs had routed the trim system piping through the control room, where the valves were manually operated. The "push-button" system used hydraulic operators on each valve, remotely electrically operated (actually via toggle switches) from the control room. This greatly conserved control room space and reduced the time required to conduct trim operations. The overall layout made coordination of the weapons and ship control systems easier during combat operations.

Cutaway drawing of Skipjack class1: 1. Sonar arrays; 2. Torpedo room; 3. Operations compartment; 4. Reactor compartment; 5. Auxiliary machinery space; 6. Engine room

Much of the overall internal arrangement was continued in the subsequent Thresher- and Sturgeon-class submarines. The Skipjacks' five compartments were called the Torpedo Room, Operations Compartment, Reactor Compartment, Auxiliary Machinery Space (AMS), and Engine Room. With the addition of a missile compartment, the arrangement of the first 41 US nuclear-powered ballistic missile submarines (SSBNs) was similar. The design was primarily single-hull, with a double hull around the torpedo room and AMS for ballast tanks. The design was improved on the Threshers, the one-off Tullibee, and subsequent attack submarines by relocating the torpedo room into the operations compartment via angled midships torpedo tubes to make room for a large sonar sphere in the bow. The George Washington class, the first SSBNs, were derived from the Skipjacks, with USS George Washington (SSBN-598) rebuilt from the incomplete first Scorpion. The hull of Scorpion was laid down twice, as the original hull was redesigned to become the George Washington. Also, the material for building Scamp was diverted into building Theodore Roosevelt, which delayed Scamp's progress.

The bow planes were moved to the massive sail to cut down on flow-induced noise near the bow sonar arrays. They were known as sail planes (fairwater planes). The Skipjacks were the first class built with sail planes; they were later backfitted on the Barbels. This design feature would be repeated on all U.S. nuclear submarines until the improved Los Angeles-class submarine, the first of which was launched in 1988. The small "turtleback" behind the sail was the exhaust piping of the auxiliary diesel generator.

The Skipjacks also introduced the S5W reactor to U.S. nuclear submarines. It was known as ASFR (Advanced Submarine Fleet Reactor) during development. The S5W was used on 98 U.S. nuclear submarines of 8 classes and the first British nuclear submarine, HMS Dreadnought, making it the most-used US Navy reactor design to date.

The design of the prototype HMS Dreadnought is closely related to the Skipjack class. The entire aft section of HMS Dreadnought was identical to the Skipjack class as the hull was built around the reactor and could not be changed, but since the fore section was based on earlier British studies into nuclear submarine design, great care had to be taken to marry the two designs' alignment.

== Service ==
Skipjack was authorized in the FY 1956 new construction program and commissioned in April 1959. Each hull cost around $40 million. Skipjack was certified as the "world's fastest submarine" after initial sea trials in March 1959, although the actual speed attained was classified. The Skipjacks remained the fastest US nuclear-powered submarines until the first of the Los Angeles class entered service in 1974. This was due to the increased size of the Thresher and Sturgeon classes, which retained Skipjack's S5W power plant, plus the introduction of the skewback screw, which was quiet but mechanically inefficient. The Skipjacks saw service during the Vietnam War and most of the Cold War. The Skipjack-class submarines were withdrawn from service in the late 1980s and early 1990s except for Scorpion, which sank on 22 May 1968 southwest of the Azores while returning from a Mediterranean deployment, with all 99 crewmembers lost.

== Boats in class ==
The gap in the hull-number sequence was taken by the two one-of-a-kind submarines USS Triton (SSRN-586) and USS Halibut (SSGN-587).

Name	Hull number	Builder	Laid Down	Launched	Commissioned	Decommissioned	Period of service	Fate
Skipjack	SSN-585	Electric Boat	29 May 1956	26 May 1958	15 April 1959	19 April 1990	31.0	Recycled, (Note: via the nuclear Ship and Submarine Recycling Program) 1 September 1998.
Scamp	SSN-588	Mare Island Naval Shipyard	23 January 1959	8 October 1960	5 June 1961	28 April 1988	26.9	Recycled, 9 September 1994.
Scorpion	SSN-589	Electric Boat	20 August 1958	29 December 1959	29 July 1960	—N/a	7.8	Lost with 99 crewmembers between 22 May and 5 June 1968, 400 nautical miles (740 km) southwest of the Azores in the North Atlantic Ocean, cause unknown
Sculpin	SSN-590	Ingalls Shipbuilding, Pascagoula, Mississippi	3 February 1958	31 March 1960	1 June 1961	3 August 1990	29.1	Recycled, 30 October 2001.
Shark	SSN-591	Newport News Shipbuilding	24 February 1958	16 March 1960	9 February 1961	15 September 1990	29.6	Recycled, 28 June 1996.
Snook	SSN-592	Ingalls Shipbuilding, Pascagoula, Mississippi	7 April 1958	31 October 1960	24 October 1961	14 November 1986	25.0	Recycled, 30 June 1997.

== Export ==
=== Netherlands ===
During the 1960s the Royal Netherlands Navy (RNLN) had the desire to build nuclear submarines. One of the options the RNLN considered in 1966 was acquiring knowledge from the United States Navy (USN) to build submarines based on the Skipjack class. The idea was that the technology of the Skipjack class dated back to 1956 and if submarines based on this technology were to be built in the Netherlands they would enter service in 1973, making them no longer top secret technology that the USN would be reluctant to share. Nonetheless, the USN believed that construction and maintenance of four Skipjack class submarines would be too costly for the RNLN and suggested other alternatives.

== See also ==
- List of submarines of the United States Navy
- List of submarine classes of the United States Navy
- List of lost United States submarines
