= USS Shark (SSN-591) =

Submarine of the United States

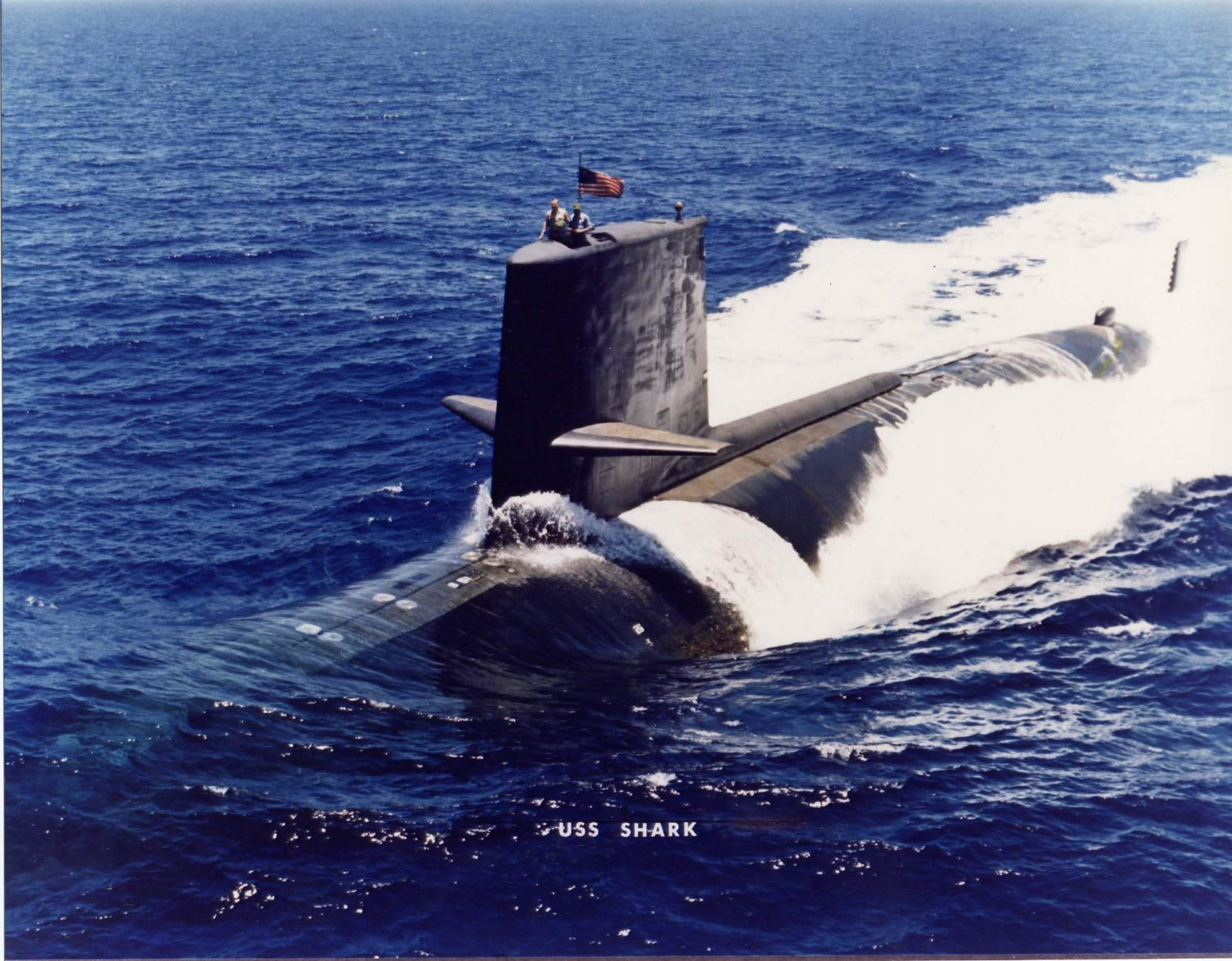
- USS Shark (SSN-591) in the early 1980s.

History

United States
- Name: Shark
- Ordered: 31 January 1957
- Builder: Newport News Shipbuilding and Dry Dock Company
- Laid down: 24 February 1958
- Launched: 16 March 1960
- Commissioned: 9 February 1961
- Decommissioned: 15 September 1990
- Stricken: 15 September 1990
- Fate: Entered the Submarine Recycling Program on 1 October 1995

General characteristics
- Class & type: Skipjack-class submarine
- Displacement: 2,880 long tons (2,930 t) surfaced; 3,500 long tons (3,600 t) submerged
- Length: 251 ft 8 in (76.71 m)
- Beam: 31 ft 7.75 in (9.6457 m)
- Draft: 30 ft (9.1 m)
- Propulsion: 1 × S5W reactor; 2 × Westinghouse steam turbines, 15,000 shp (11 MW); 1 shaft
- Speed: 16 knots (18 mph; 30 km/h) surfaced; More than 30 knots (35 mph; 56 km/h) submerged
- Complement: 83
- Armament: 6 × 21 in (530 mm) torpedo tubes

USS Shark (SSN-591), a Skipjack-class submarine, was the seventh ship of the United States Navy to be named for the shark.

== Construction and commissioning ==
Shark′s keel was laid down on 24 February 1958 by the Newport News Shipbuilding and Dry Dock Company in Newport News, Virginia. She was launched on 16 March 1960, sponsored by Mrs. Louis Shane, Jr., and commissioned on 9 February 1961 with Lieutenant Commander John F. Fagan, Jr., in command.

== Operational history ==
=== 1960s ===
After preliminary testing and fitting out, Shark sailed to the Caribbean Sea in May 1961 for her shakedown cruise. The submarine returned to her building yard for post-shakedown repairs and final acceptance by the Navy.

Shark sailed for the Mediterranean Sea and duty with the Sixth Fleet on 12 August 1961. This was the first deployment in the area for a nuclear submarine, and Shark was deployed there until 14 November 1961.

In the September–October phase of the tour, Shark visited Athens, Greece (Piraeus) and hosted the entire Greek Royal family aboard for a cruise both above and underwater.

On 29 January 1962, the submarine steamed to Bermuda in the British West Indies, for two weeks of type training. She was next deployed to the North Atlantic from 15 March to 23 May. During this period, Shark paid a one-week visit to Portsmouth, England. On 25 August, she departed for another two months in the North Atlantic. On her return trip to Norfolk, Virginia, she underwent an availability period that lasted until 7 January 1963.

Shark participated in SUBFALLEX in the North Atlantic from 7 August to 24 October, with a week spent in Faslane, Scotland. The remainder of 1963 was either spent in port, in local operations, or conducting antisubmarine warfare exercises in the Caribbean.

On 22 March 1964, Shark departed Norfolk to participate in SUBSPRINGEX and returned on 21 May. On 25 June 1964, she sailed to Charleston, South Carolina, for her first shipyard overhaul which lasted until 7 June 1965. On 7 April 1965, at the shipyard, Shark was presented the Navy Unit Commendation for meritorious service from 5 April to 9 May 1964, a period in which she "achieved results of great value and importance to the United States Navy in the field of antisubmarine warfare capabilities."

The submarine put to sea for sea trials on 7 June. One month later, she suffered damage to the forward oxygen system which necessitated additional repairs at Charleston, South Carolina. On 9 October, she passed her sea trials and sailed to Key West, Florida, for two weeks of torpedo tube tests and a wire-guided torpedo development project.

Shark returned to Norfolk on 25 October 1965 and conducted type training, individual ship exercises, and antisubmarine warfare exercises until 8 January 1966. The boat then operated in the Caribbean until 7 February. She was there again for further trials in July and October.

Shark stood out of Norfolk on 7 January 1967 for the North Atlantic and conducted special operations until 24 March. Two weeks of this period were spent at Holy Loch, Scotland. On 12 April, she was presented her second Navy Unit Commendation for operations in 1966 in which "Shark contributed significantly to the knowledge of the United States Navy in the field of antisubmarine warfare." Shark departed Norfolk on 16 May for Halifax, Nova Scotia, which was the first visit of a nuclear ship to a Canadian port. The submarine operated with Royal Canadian Navy ASW units before returning to her home port.

In 1967 Shark was used in a Naval Department educational film for training and public relations.

On 11 June 1967, Shark prepared for her first refueling period at the Norfolk Naval Shipyard and did not put to sea again until March 1968. The remainder of 1968 and 1969 was spent performing local or special operations.

=== 1970s ===
Shark was in drydock at Norfolk from 1 January 1970 to 9 August 1971. The remainder of the year and 1972 was spent in refresher training and undergoing various trials along the East Coast, with the exception of a deployment to the Sixth Fleet from 31 May to 19 November 1972.

Mare Island Naval Shipyard for overhaul September 1981 to May 1983. Returned to New London Connecticut.
History from 1972 to 1986 needed.

She would take part in another deployment with the Atlantic Fleet in 1974 before returning to Pascagoula for a reactor refueling in August. This refueling and overhaul would take more than two years.

When Shark returned to the ocean, her home port was changed to New London, Connecticut. In 1978, Shark had a busy schedule, taking part in UNITAS exercises with a number of South American navies and deploying to Mediterranean as part of the Sixth Fleet. In 1980, Shark took part in exercises with the Atlantic Fleet and the Royal Canadian Navy.

== Decommissioning ==
Shark was deactivated, in commission, and formally decommissioned and stricken from the Naval Vessel Register on 15 September 1990. Shark was the last Skipjack to be taken out of service. She entered the Nuclear Powered Ship and Submarine Recycling Program in Bremerton, Washington, on 1 October 1995 and on 28 June 1996 ceased to exist.
