= USS Scamp (SSN-588) =

Submarine of the United States

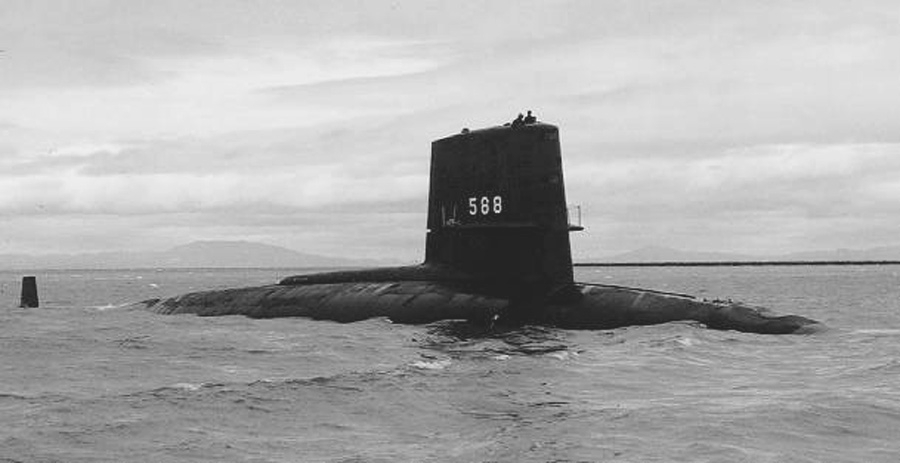
- USS Scamp (SSN-288)

History

United States
- Name: USS Scamp
- Ordered: 23 July 1957
- Builder: Mare Island Naval Shipyard
- Laid down: 23 January 1959
- Launched: 8 October 1960
- Commissioned: 5 June 1961
- Decommissioned: 28 April 1988
- Stricken: 28 April 1988
- Honors and awards: Three campaign stars for Vietnam War service
- Fate: Entered the Submarine Recycling Program in 1990
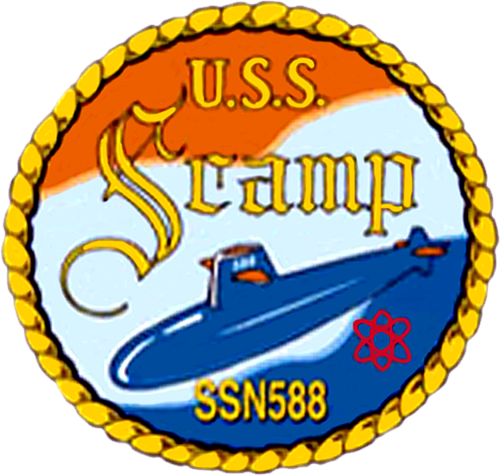
- Badge

General characteristics
- Class & type: Skipjack-class submarine
- Displacement: 2,830 long tons (2,880 t) surfaced; 3,500 long tons (3,600 t) submerged
- Length: 251 ft 8 in (76.71 m)
- Beam: 31 ft 7.75 in (9.6457 m)
- Draft: 30 ft 5 in (9.27 m)
- Propulsion: 1 × S5W reactor; 2 × Westinghouse steam turbines, 15,000 shp (11 MW); 1 shaft
- Speed: 31 knots (36 mph; 57 km/h)
- Complement: 83 officers & men
- Armament: 6 × 21 in (530 mm) torpedo tubes

Service record
- Part of: US Seventh Fleet
- Operations: Vietnam War
- Awards: 3 Battle stars

USS Scamp (SSN-588), a Skipjack-class nuclear-powered submarine, was the second ship of the United States Navy to be named for the scamp, a member of the fish family Serranidae.

== Construction and commissioning ==
Scamp′s keel was laid down on 23 January 1959 at Mare Island Naval Shipyard in Vallejo, California. She was launched on 8 October 1960, sponsored by Mrs. John C. Hollingsworth, widow of Commander John C. Hollingsworth, the commanding officer of USS Scamp (SS-277) at the time of her loss in November 1944 during World War II. She was commissioned at Mare Island Naval Shipyard on 5 June 1961 with Commander W. N. Dietzen in command.

== Operational history ==
=== 1960s ===
Scamp’s first four months in the fleet were taken up by advanced trials and training exercises in the Bremerton, Washington, San Diego, California, and Pearl Harbor, areas. Following these operations, she returned to Vallejo, California, for post-shakedown availability at Mare Island Naval Shipyard. Leaving the shipyard Scamp completed her final acceptance trials and began local operations in the San Diego area. During training the sub lost her screw off the coast of California on 4 December 1961 and was towed back to Mare Island by the Coast Guard Cutter USCGC Comananche WMEC-202 ( built for the USN as ATA-202 in 1944) In April 1962 she deployed to the western Pacific, returning to San Diego in July. She operated locally until September, when she departed on another extended training cruise. Scamp returned to San Diego and local operations until February 1963 when she entered Mare Island Naval Shipyard for interim drydocking. She refloated in March and, in April, deployed again to the western Pacific. While in the Far East, she conducted another extended period of advanced training, including operations in the Okinawa area. Scamp reentered San Diego Bay in October 1963. She resumed her West Coast operations out of San Diego until June 1964, then, she headed west again for advanced readiness training. She arrived back in San Diego in September 1964.

Scamp entered Mare Island Naval Shipyard again in January 1965 for extensive modification. In June 1966 after the installation of the SUBSAFE package and overhaul, she left Mare Island and returned to training cruises in the San Diego operating area. In November she ventured north to Puget Sound for a month of operations and returned to San Diego in December. The nuclear submarine operated out of San Diego for the first six months of 1967. On 28 June, she departed San Diego to join the Seventh Fleet in the western Pacific. She remained in the Far East, participating in fleet operations along the Vietnamese coast, until returning to San Diego on 28 December 1967.

Scamp operated out of San Diego in the local operating area from January to May 1968. On 11 May, she arrived at Pearl Harbor to conclude an extended training cruise. She returned to San Diego on 19 May and remained there until 15 June, when the submarine shifted to San Francisco to enter Mare Island Naval Shipyard for a three-week restricted availability. She returned to San Diego on 16 July and finished out the year sailing from that port on various exercises and training cruises.

Scamp continued stateside duty throughout 1969. She alternated in-port periods with training cruises until early March when she began pre-overhaul tests in the San Diego operating area. She continued preparing for overhaul and participating in exercises until 1 November when she entered Puget Sound Naval Shipyard for regular overhaul. While at Bremerton, Scamp was assigned that port as her new home port. The overhaul continued through 1970 and ended in January 1971.

=== 1970s ===
Following post-overhaul sea trials in Puget Sound, Scamp was reassigned back to San Diego, as home port on 12 February 1971, but did not enter that port until 16 April after a voyage to Pearl Harbor. On 27 July, she deployed to the western Pacific. Scamp stopped at Pearl Harbor from 2 August to 13 August, then headed on to Subic Bay, arriving on 30 August. For the bulk of 1971, she operated with the Seventh Fleet in Far Eastern waters other than off the coast of Vietnam, except for one short two-day period, 8 October and 9 October.

She returned to San Diego on 2 February 1972, but following the North Vietnamese Easter Offensive, redeployed to the Seventh Fleet in May. She operated in the South China Sea for most of the summer, returning to San Diego on 1 August. Upon arrival, she went into a two-month standdown period, followed by more than a month of restricted availability at Puget Sound Naval Shipyard. She departed Puget Sound on 28 November, conducted weapons system accuracy tests, and returned, on 11 December, to San Diego, where she remained for the remainder of the year.

Scamp operated locally around San Diego until 29 March 1973. At that time, she departed the West Coast for deployment to the Far East. She stayed at Pearl Harbor between 5 and 10 April, then headed for Yokosuka, Japan. She arrived in Japan on 23 April and operated with the Seventh Fleet until 1 September, when she departed Guam for Pearl Harbor. Scamp stopped at Pearl Harbor during the period 10 to 15 September, then set sail for San Diego. Arriving on 21 September the nuclear submarine immediately entered a period of standdown and upkeep until 1 November, when she resumed operations in the vicinity of San Diego.

Scamp participated in UNITAS XIX

=== 1980s ===
Scamp was home ported in Groton Naval Submarine Base New London, Connecticut during the early 80s. She deployed for five months to the Mediterranean Sea from October 1982, to March 1983. During this time, Scamp was sent to the Libyan coast, where she monitored the shoreline, and the military activity thereon, while protecting the aircraft carrier (possibly the JFK???) which had purposefully violated the Line of Death Muammar Gaddafi drew far into International Waters. This incursion earned many men inclusion into the VFW, whether they know it or not.

By the end of 1983, she had earned her second BATTLE EFFICIENCY SERVICE AWARD.

In July 1984, Scamp participated in UNITAS XXV with South America.

During a storm in the North Atlantic on 24 February 1987, while attempting to rescue members of the crew of the sinking Philippine freighter, MV Balsa 24, Scamp suffered flooding and damage to her sail which led to her early retirement. The sub saved the life of one crew member, 18 others perished.

== Decommissioning ==
Scamp was decommissioned and stricken from the Naval Vessel Register on 28 April 1988. ex-Scamp entered the Nuclear Powered Ship and Submarine Recycling Program in Bremerton, Washington, in 1990 and on 9 September 1994 became the first hulk to complete the program and ceased to exist.

== Honors and awards ==
- Meritorious Unit Commendation with two stars (3 awards)
- Navy E Ribbon
- Vietnam Service Medal with three campaign stars for Vietnam War service

Scamp earned her first Navy E Ribbon in 1977 and her second in 1983. She received her Meritorious Unit Commendations in 1971 and 1972 and for service on 24 February 1987.
