= USS Sculpin (SSN-590) =

Submarine of the United States

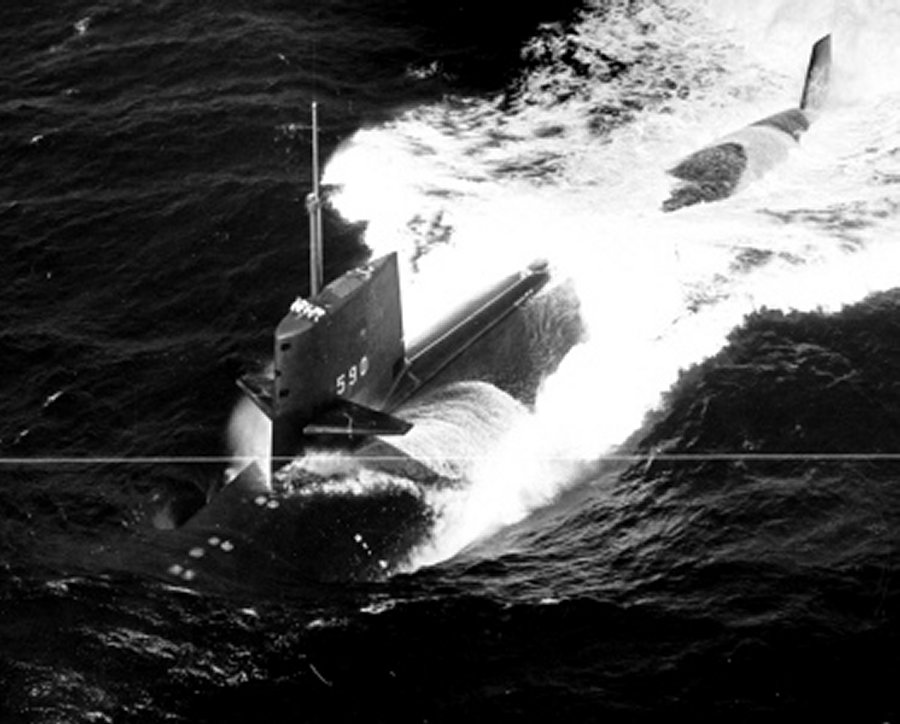
- USS Sculpin (SSN-590), underway in the Gulf of Mexico during her alpha trials, 9-1-1961.

History

United States
- Name: USS Sculpin
- Ordered: 18 January 1957
- Builder: Ingalls Shipbuilding
- Laid down: 3 February 1958
- Launched: 31 March 1960
- Commissioned: 1 June 1961
- Decommissioned: 3 August 1990
- Stricken: 30 August 1990
- Motto: "Videte eos prius" - "See 'em first"
- Fate: Entered the Submarine Recycling Program on 1 October 2000

General characteristics
- Class & type: Skipjack-class submarine
- Displacement: 2,830 long tons (2,880 t) surfaced; 3,500 long tons (3,600 t) submerged
- Length: 251 ft 8 in (76.71 m)
- Beam: 31 ft 7.75 in (9.6457 m)
- Draft: 28 ft (8.5 m)
- Propulsion: 1 × S5W reactor; 2 × Westinghouse steam turbines, 15,000 shp (11 MW); 1 shaft
- Speed: 15 knots (17 mph; 28 km/h) surfaced; More than 30 knots (35 mph; 56 km/h) submerged
- Test depth: 700 ft (210 m)
- Complement: 118
- Sensors & processing systems: BPS-12 radar; BQR-21 sonar; BQR-2 passive sonar; BQS-4 (modified) active/passive sonar
- Armament: 6 × 21 in (530 mm) torpedo tubes

USS Sculpin (SSN-590), a Skipjack-class nuclear-powered submarine, was the second ship of the United States Navy to be named for the sculpin.

== Construction and commissioning ==
Sculpin′s keel was laid down on 3 February 1958 by Ingalls Shipbuilding in Pascagoula, Mississippi. She was launched on 31 March 1960, sponsored by Mrs. Fred Connaway, widow of Commander Fred Connaway, who was killed while commanding the first USS Sculpin (SS-191) during World War II, and commissioned on 1 June 1961 with Commander C. N. Mitchell in command.

== Operational history ==
=== 1960s ===
Sculpin departed Pascagoula on 8 June for her designated home port, San Diego, California. Following her arrival there, she began a period of shakedown training. In July, she held special trials and tests in the Puget Sound area and then returned to San Diego for type training. In August, Sculpin cruised to Pearl Harbor for two weeks before returning to San Diego. She operated off the West Coast before entering the Mare Island Naval Shipyard for post-shakedown availability in October. This was completed in late March 1962, and Sculpin returned to her home port.

Following training operations, in early May she deployed for the western pacific visiting Pearl Harbor and then continued her special operations in the western Pacific, upon completing operations visited Naha, Okinawa and Pearl Harbor returning to San Diego in August. The nuclear submarine participated in local training operations, ordnance evaluation projects, and fleet exercises until entering the Mare Island Naval Shipyard in early January 1963 for a hull survey. Sculpin returned to San Diego at the end of the month, conducted type training for two months and, on 29 March, got underway for a dependents' cruise. The submarine returned to Mare Island in April for restricted availability and remained there until August when she returned to San Diego and commenced local operations. She was the first submarine leaving Mare Island after the Thresher Disaster.

Sculpin was in Pearl Harbor, in early December, en route to the western Pacific, when defective piping forced her to sail back to Mare Island for repairs. She returned to San Diego on 25 February 1964, and operated from that port until early April. On 8 April, Sculpin sailed for duty with the Seventh Fleet. Prior to reporting, she made port calls at Pearl Harbor, Sydney, and Subic Bay. For the remainder of her deployment, Sculpin operated in and out of Subic Bay, and Naha, Okinawa, with the Seventh Fleet. She returned to her home port on 20 October 1964 and was awarded the Navy Unit Commendation for her deployment. Operations and exercises along the west coast, from San Diego to Bangor, Washington, occupied the submarine for the next 25 months.

On 27 November 1966, Sculpin stood out of San Diego for Naha and another tour with the Seventh Fleet. She returned to her home port on 11 May 1967 and began conducting local operations. The submarine had an extended training cruise from 27 July to 26 October and, on 11 November, gave a demonstration dive for President of the United States Lyndon B. Johnson.

On 31 December, Sculpin was notified that she was due for drydock and overhaul at Puget Sound, and she sailed for that destination on 2 January 1968. This was Sculpin's first major overhaul and refueling since commissioning, seven years before, and she was in drydock from 30 January 1968 to 22 January 1969. Sea trials and training lasted until 26 July when she sailed to Pearl Harbor on a shakedown training cruise. She returned to the West Coast on 22 August and began an upkeep period at San Diego which lasted until 8 September. The submarine operated along the California coast until 6 February 1970 when she got underway for Pearl Harbor and deployment to the western Pacific.

=== 1970s ===
Sculpin sailed from Pearl Harbor on 21 February and entered Buckner Bay, Okinawa, on 6 March. She also visited Subic Bay, Hong Kong, and Yokosuka before returning to San Diego on 21 August. She conducted local operations until 4 January 1971 when she began a three-month restricted availability period at Mare Island. The yard work was completed on 16 April, and the submarine returned to San Diego. The only interruption of her schedule came in October when she sailed to Puget Sound to have her bottom sand blasted and painted.

Sculpin returned to San Diego on 13 November 1971 and began preparing for a secret deployment to track gun smuggling trawlers in the South China Sea. The deployment began on 5 January 1972 and on 10 April 1972 Sculpin lay in wait south of the Chinese island of Hainan. After having spotted its target the Sculpin followed the smugglers for 2,500 miles to the Southern coasts of South Vietnam, where on 24 April a South Vietnamese destroyer escort under the direction of Sculpin sank the Chinese trawler. With its mission a success the Sculpin returned to port on 24 July.

She was berthed at San Diego for the remainder of the year, with only 15 days being spent at sea.

On 2 February 1973, Sculpin entered the Mare Island Naval Shipyard for a three-month restricted availability. After leaving the yard in May, the submarine operated along the Pacific coast under the command of Captain James Joseph Pistotnik, until 12 November when it arrived at San Diego and began preparing for a deployment in early January 1974. Sculpin sailed from San Diego on 7 January for Pearl Harbor and the western Pacific on an extended cruise.

In 1975 the Sculpin entered drydock for a refueling overhaul in Bremerton, Washington and following completion of the overhaul, she returned to San Diego.

Most of 1977 was spent doing weekly operations out of San Diego and recovering from the overhaul that was completed in the early part of that year. At the completion of one such operation Sculpin had returned and tied up to the tender, and was broadsided by the USS Snook SSN 592 while Snook was trying to tie up next to Sculpin. Snook suffered damage to her bow tube outer doors and had to spend the next 6 weeks in drydock for repairs, forcing Sculpin back to sea to pick up Snook's operating schedule.

Sculpin participated in the RIMPAC exercise during April and May 1978, which included port call in Pearl Harbor. In June 1978, Sculpin left San Diego and headied south. She traversed the Panama Canal on the 2nd of July, followed by a memorable port call at Willemstad, Curaçao. From there she continued North to her new home port, Groton, Connecticut. During the fall of that year, she participated in the Northern Wedding Exercises with a stop at Holy Loch Scotland for repairs. The ship returned to Groton for the Holiday Season and the crew got their first taste of Winter in New England.

In February 1979 the boat left Groton for operations in the Mediterranean.

History from 1974 to 1981 needed.

=== 1980s ===
In 1982 the boat completed a non-refueling overhaul in Mare Island Naval Shipyard. During sea trails, it experienced severe angles while completing a crashback maneuver while submerged. It recovered and made its way to San Diego, then went to its home port in Groton, Ct. (Subron 2) via the Panama Canal. After shakedowns and short cruises in 1983, in 1984 Sculpin served in the Mediterranean performing picket duty between Syria and the USS New Jersey as the New Jersey shelled Lebanon (a consequence of the 1983 bombing of the Marine barracks in Beirut).

History from 1985 to 1990 needed.

== Decommissioning ==
Sculpin was decommissioned on 3 August 1990 and stricken from the Naval Vessel Register on 30 August 1990. Her final Captain was Cmdr. J. B. Allen. Sculpin was decommissioned at Newport News Naval Shipyard with ceremonies occurring at Norfolk Naval Base prior to the shipyard event. ex-Sculpin entered the Nuclear Powered Ship and Submarine Recycling Program in Bremerton, Washington, on 1 October 2000 and on 30 October 2001 ceased to exist.
