= USS Potomac (SSGN-814) =

US Navy Virginia-class submarine

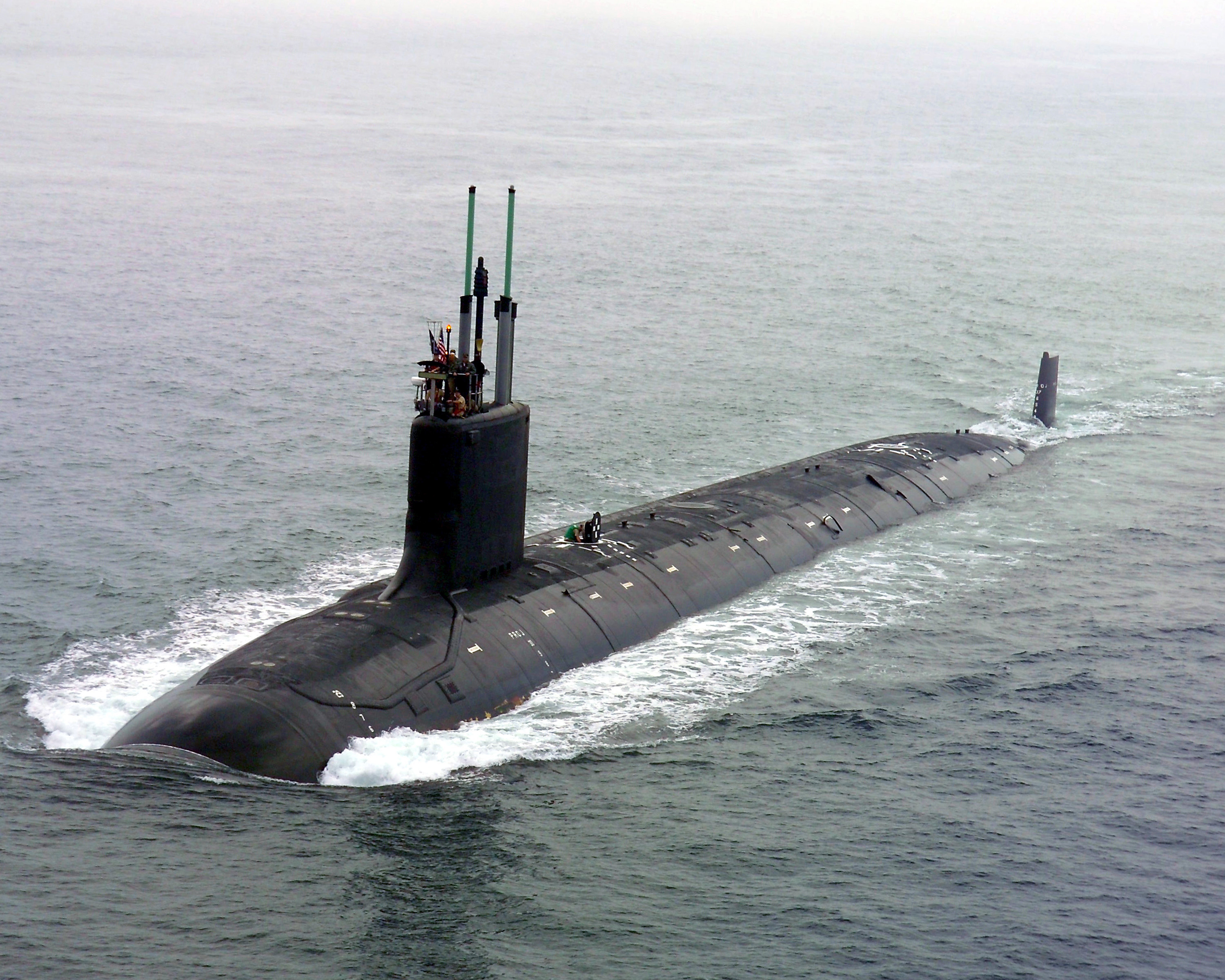
- The lead boat of the Virginia class, USS Virginia (SSN-774)

History

United States
- Name: Potomac
- Namesake: Potomac River
- Ordered: TBD
- Commissioned: 2034–2035 (estimated)
- Identification: Pennant number: SSGN-814

General characteristics
- Class & type: Virginia-class submarine
- Displacement: 10,200 tons
- Length: 460 ft (140 m)
- Beam: 34 ft (10.4 m)
- Draft: 32 ft (9.8 m)
- Propulsion: S9G reactor auxiliary diesel engine
- Speed: 25 knots (46 km/h)
- Endurance: can remain submerged for more than 3 months
- Test depth: greater than 800 ft (244 m)
- Complement: 15 officers; 120 enlisted crew
- Armament: 40 VLS tubes; four 21 inch (530 mm) torpedo tubes for Mk-48 torpedoes or BGM-109 Tomahawk

USS Potomac (SSGN-814) will be a nuclear-powered Virginia-class submarine of the United States Navy, the first Block VI attack submarine and 41st overall of her class.

== Construction ==
The submarine would be the seventh U.S. Navy vessel named for the Potomac River, an important river to Washington DC and the Chesapeake Bay.

Uniquely, Potomac was not ordered prior to her naming due to a dispute between the Navy and builder Huntington Ingalls Industries over the potential cost.

She will be sponsored by Lisa Collis, the wife of US Senator Mark Warner. The FY2026 budget allocated an additional US$1.8 billion, on top of the $4.56 billion from 2023 & 2024, for the construction of Potomac and her sister submarines, USS Norfolk (SSN-815) and USS Brooklyn (SSN-816). Potomac is estimated to completed and enter service by 2034–2035.

== Design ==
Like their Block V predecessors, Block VI submarines will incorporate previously introduced modifications to the base design, including the Virginia Payload Module (VPM). The VPM inserts a segment into the middle of the boat's hull behind the conning tower, which adds four Multiple All-up-round Canisters (MAC) with each MAC containing seven vertical launch tubes. Each tube is loaded with a Tomahawk strike missile giving the VPM a total of 28 missiles. Combined with the 12 missiles loaded in the two "six-shooter" Virginia Payload Tubes (VPT) on the bow (each VPT has six missiles), first incorporated into Block III boats, this increases her armament to a total of 40 missiles.
