= USS Atlanta (SSGN-813) =

US Navy Virginia-class submarine

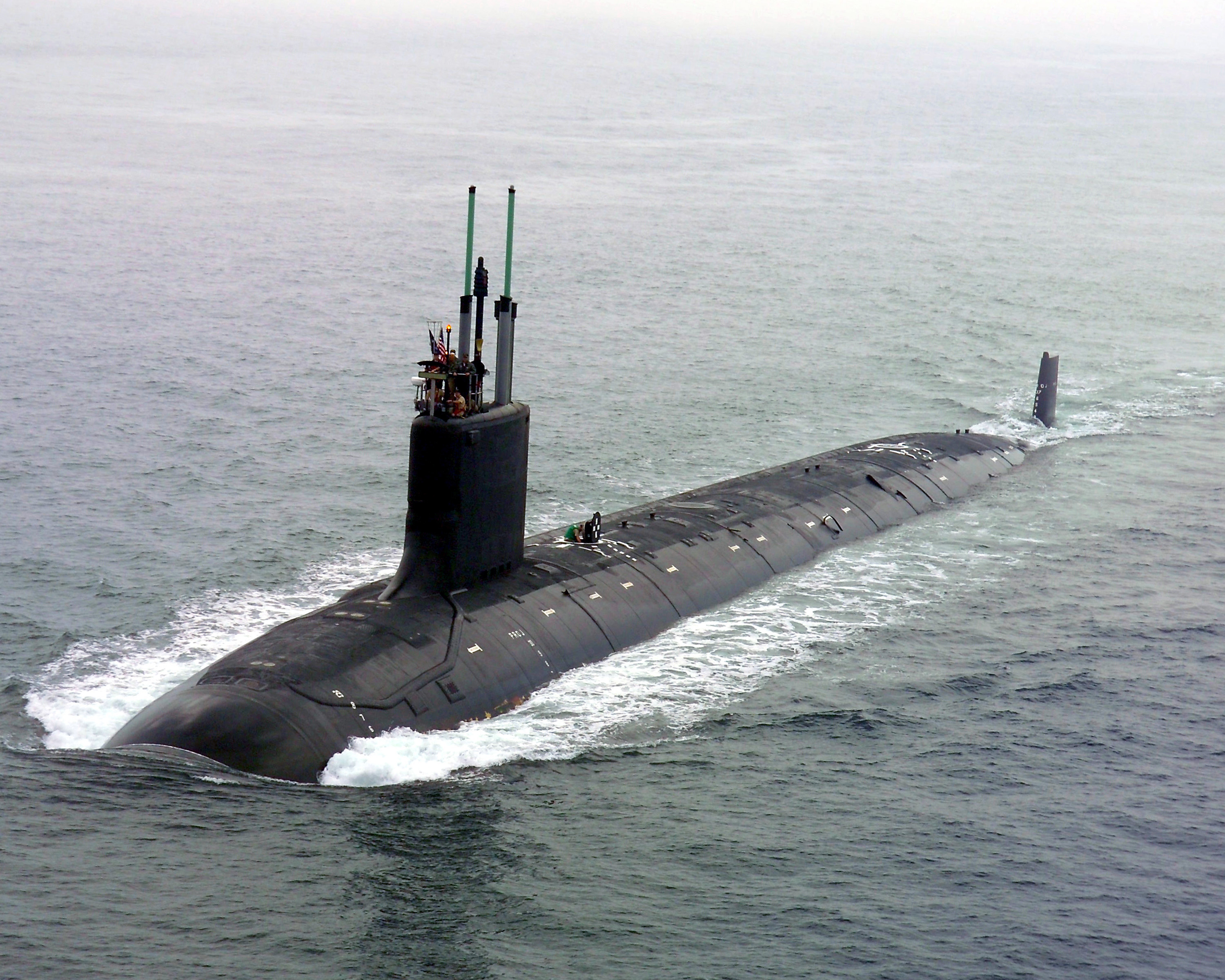
- The lead boat of the Virginia class, USS Virginia (SSN-774)

History

United States
- Name: Atlanta
- Namesake: Atlanta, Georgia
- Ordered: 2024
- Identification: Pennant number: SSGN-813

General characteristics
- Class & type: Virginia-class submarine
- Displacement: 10,200 tons
- Length: 460 ft (140 m)
- Beam: 34 ft (10.4 m)
- Draft: 32 ft (9.8 m)
- Propulsion: S9G reactor auxiliary diesel engine
- Speed: 25 knots (46 km/h)
- Endurance: can remain submerged for more than 3 months
- Test depth: greater than 800 ft (244 m)
- Complement: 15 officers; 120 enlisted crew
- Armament: 40 VLS tubes (12 forward VPT; 28 in VPM), four 21 inch (530 mm) torpedo tubes for Mk-48 torpedoes BGM-109 Tomahawk

USS Atlanta (SSGN-813) will be a nuclear-powered Virginia-class submarine of the United States Navy, the twelfth Block V attack submarine and 40th overall of her class.

The submarine will be the sixth U.S. Navy vessel named for Atlanta, Georgia.

Atlanta and sister ship Baltimore were ordered during the 2024 Fiscal Year budget at a combined cost of $9.4 billion.

== Design ==
Compared to Blocks I-IV of Virginia-class submarines, Block V vessels will incorporate previously introduced modifications to the base design in addition to a Virginia Payload Module (VPM). The VPM inserts a segment into the boat's hull which adds four vertical launch tubes. Each tube allows for the carrying of seven Tomahawk strike missiles, increasing her armament to a total of 40 missiles.
