= USS Long Island (SSGN-809) =

US Navy Virginia-class submarine

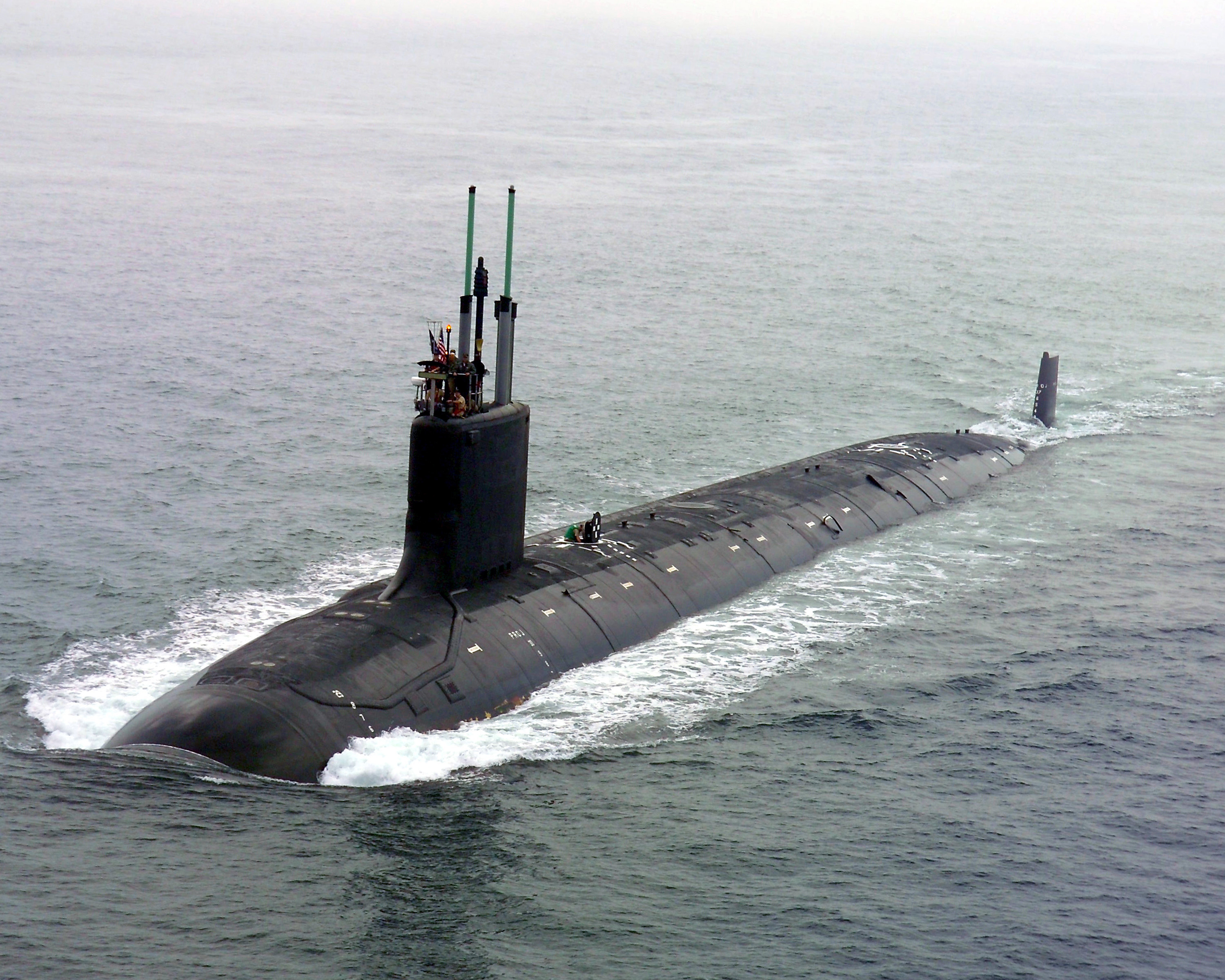
- The lead boat of the Virginia class, USS Virginia

History

United States
- Name: Long Island
- Namesake: Long Island, New York
- Ordered: 2 December 2019
- Builder: Huntington Ingalls Industries
- Identification: Pennant number:SSGN-809

General characteristics
- Class & type: Virginia-class submarine
- Displacement: 10,200 tons
- Length: 460 ft (140 m)
- Beam: 34 ft (10.4 m)
- Draft: 32 ft (9.8 m)
- Propulsion: S9G reactor auxiliary diesel engine
- Speed: 25 knots (46 km/h)
- Endurance: can remain submerged for more than 3 months
- Test depth: greater than 800 ft (244 m)
- Complement: 15 officers; 120 enlisted crew
- Armament: 40 VLS tubes (12 forward VPT; 28 in VPM), four 21 inch (530 mm) torpedo tubes for Mk-48 torpedoes BGM-109 Tomahawk

USS Long Island (SSGN-809) will be a nuclear-powered Virginia-class submarine for the United States Navy, the eighth of the Block V attack submarines and 36th overall of the class. She will be the third U.S. Naval vessel named for Long Island, New York, an island on the U.S. east coast that is part of the New York metropolitan area. The first ship to bear the name was a steam trawler purchased by the Navy during World War I and the second ship was a Long Island-class escort carrier that saw service during World War II.

The submarine's name was announced on 25 May 2023 by Navy Secretary Carlos Del Toro from the deck of USS Wasp (LHD-1) while she was in port in New York City.

== Design ==
Compared to Blocks I-IV of Virginia-class submarines, Block V vessels will incorporate previously introduced modifications to the base design in addition to a Virginia Payload Module (VPM). The VPM inserts a segment into the boat's hull which adds four vertical launch tubes. Each tube allows for the carrying of seven Tomahawk strike missiles, increasing her armament to a total of 40 missiles.
