= USS Oklahoma (SSN-802) =

US Navy Virginia-class submarine

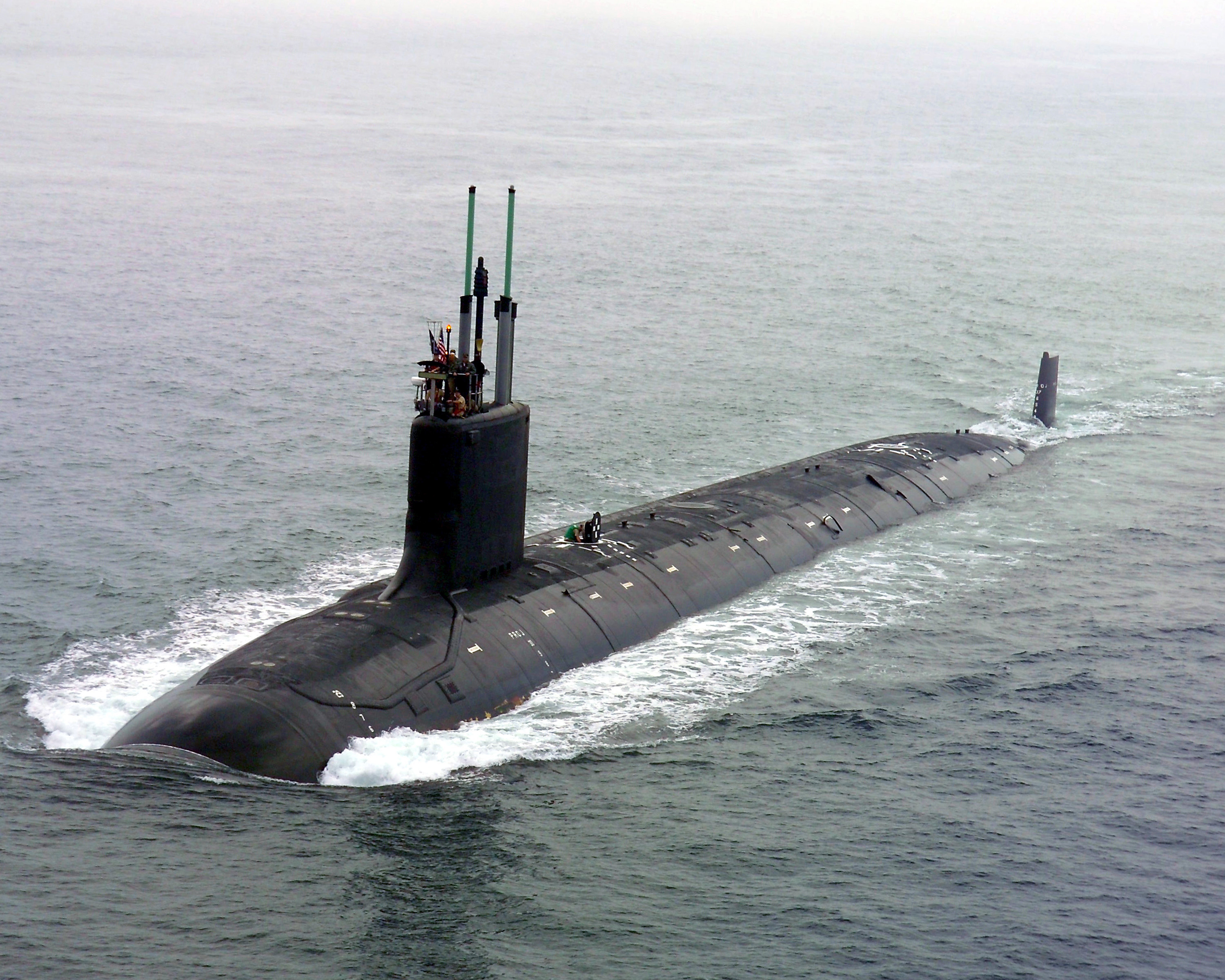
- The lead boat of the Virginia class, USS Virginia (SSN-774)

History

United States
- Name: USS Oklahoma
- Namesake: State of Oklahoma
- Ordered: 2 December 2019
- Builder: Newport News Shipbuilding, Newport News, Virginia
- Laid down: 2 August 2023
- Sponsored by: Mary “Molly” Slavonic
- Status: Under construction

General characteristics
- Class & type: Virginia-class submarine
- Displacement: 7,800 tons
- Length: 377 ft (115 m)
- Beam: 34 ft (10.4 m)
- Draft: 32 ft (9.8 m)
- Propulsion: S9G reactor auxiliary diesel engine
- Speed: 25 knots (46 km/h)
- Endurance: can remain submerged for up to 3 months
- Test depth: greater than 800 ft (244 m)
- Complement: 15 officers; 120 enlisted men
- Armament: 12 VLS tubes, four 21 inch (530 mm) torpedo tubes for Mk-48 torpedoes BGM-109 Tomahawk

Oklahoma (SSN-802) will be a Virginia-class nuclear powered attack submarine in the United States Navy. She is to be the second vessel named for the state of Oklahoma, and the first to carry the name since the loss of the battleship USS Oklahoma (BB-37) during the attack on Pearl Harbor, which led to the US involvement in World War II. Acting Secretary of the Navy Thomas Modly announced the name on 24 December 2019, in a press release. Oklahoma, first of the Virginia-class Block V boats, was authorized for construction on 2 December 2019. Unlike the following Block V boats, Oklahoma will not be equipped with the Virginia Payload Module (VPM), which will instead be fitted first to USS Arizona (SSGN-803).

== Construction and career ==
Oklahoma's keel was laid down on 2 August 2023 at Newport News Shipbuilding in Newport News, Virginia in a ceremony, with the presence of her sponsor Mrs. Mary Slavonic, wife of former acting Under Secretary of the Navy Gregory Slavonic.
