= USS John H. Dalton =

US Navy Virginia-class submarine

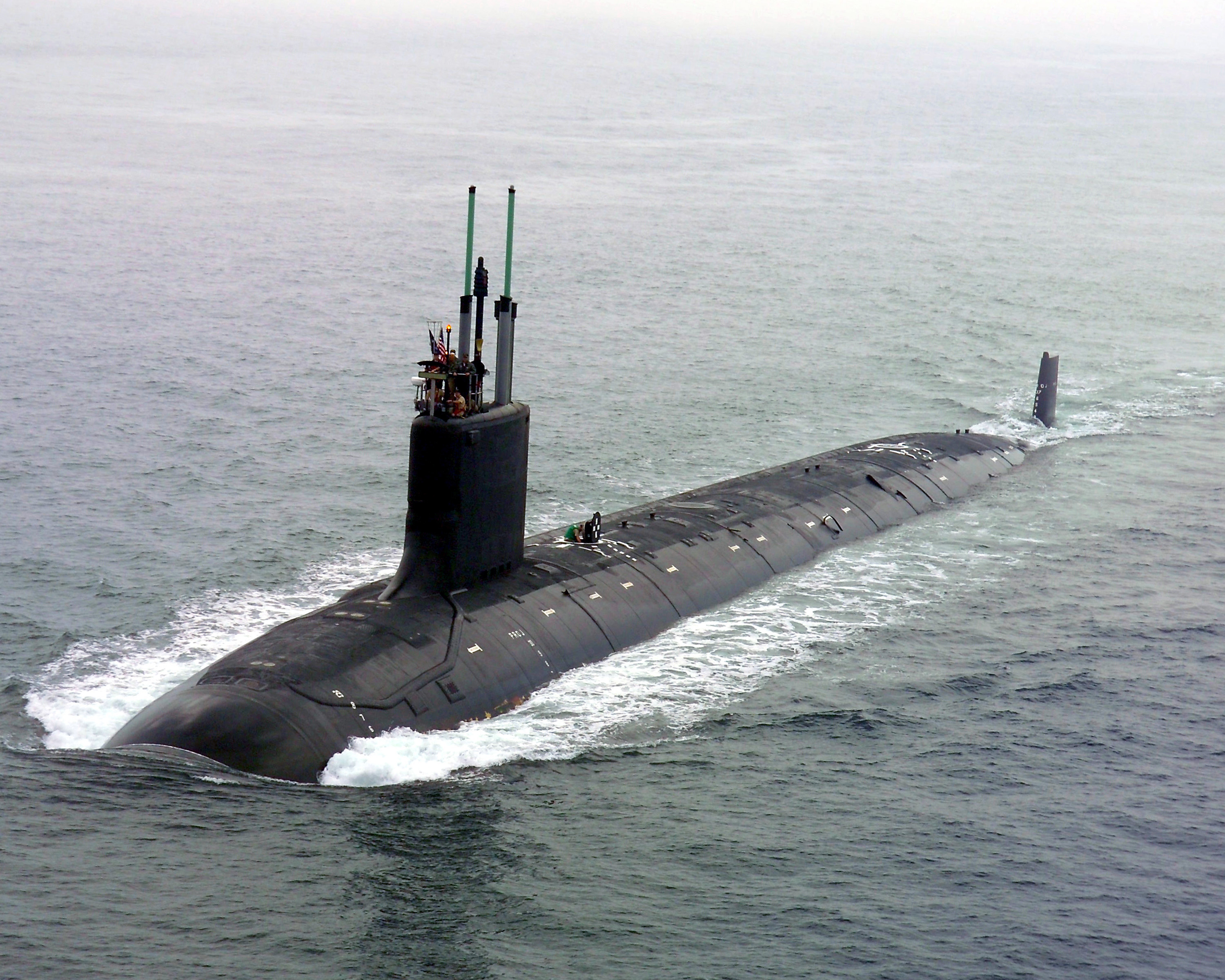
- The lead boat of the Virginia class, USS Virginia (SSN-774).

History

United States
- Name: John H. Dalton
- Namesake: John Howard Dalton
- Ordered: 2 December 2019
- Builder: General Dynamics Electric Boat
- Identification: Pennant number:SSGN-808

General characteristics
- Class & type: Virginia-class submarine
- Displacement: 10,200 tons
- Length: 460 ft (140 m)
- Beam: 34 ft (10.4 m)
- Draft: 32 ft (9.8 m)
- Propulsion: S9G reactor auxiliary diesel engine
- Speed: 25 knots (46 km/h)
- Endurance: can remain submerged for more than 3 months
- Test depth: greater than 800 ft (244 m)
- Complement: 15 officers; 120 enlisted crew
- Armament: 40 VLS tubes (12 forward VPT; 28 in VPM), four 21 inch (530 mm) torpedo tubes for Mk-48 torpedoes BGM-109 Tomahawk

USS John H. Dalton (SSGN-808) will be a nuclear-powered Virginia-class submarine for the United States Navy, the seventh of the Block V attack submarines and 35th overall of the class. She will be the first U.S. Naval vessel named for John Howard Dalton, the 70th Secretary of the Navy and a former submariner who, after graduating with distinction from the U.S. Naval Academy in 1964, served aboard the attack submarine USS Blueback (SS-581) and the ballistic missile submarine USS John C. Calhoun (SSBN-630).

The submarine's name was announced on 28 February 2023 by Navy Secretary Carlos Del Toro at the Naval Academy in Annapolis, Maryland.

== Design ==
Compared to Blocks I-IV of Virginia-class submarines, Block V vessels will incorporate previously introduced modifications to the base design in addition to a Virginia Payload Module (VPM). The VPM inserts a segment into the boat's hull which adds four vertical launch tubes. Each tube allows for the carrying of seven Tomahawk strike missiles, increasing her armament to a total of 40 missiles.
