= USS Wahoo (SSGN-806) =

US Navy Virginia-class submarine

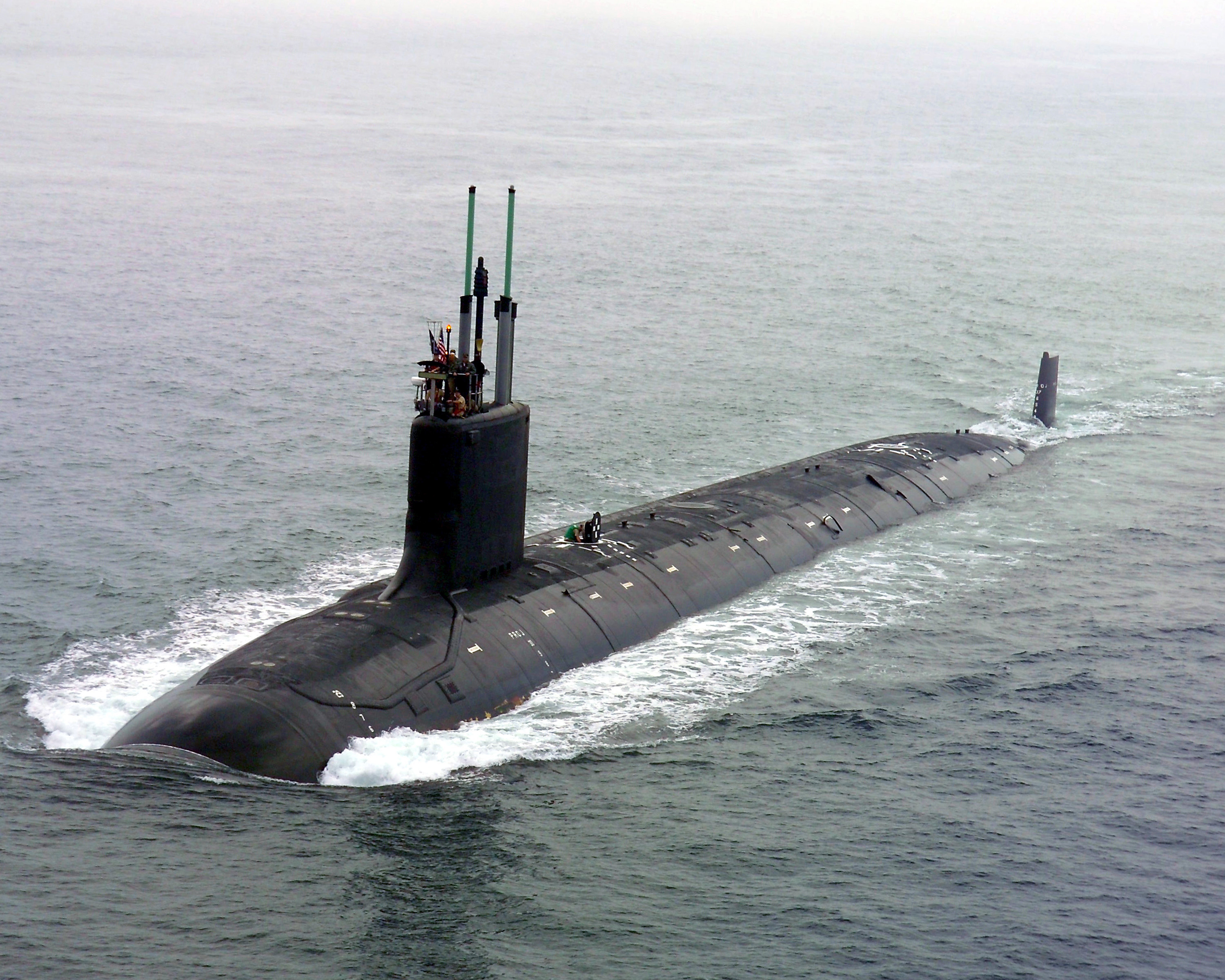
- The lead boat of the Virginia class, USS Virginia (SSN-774).

History

United States
- Name: USS Wahoo
- Namesake: Wahoo
- Ordered: 2 December 2019
- Builder: Newport News Shipbuilding, Newport News, Virginia

General characteristics
- Class & type: Virginia-class submarine
- Displacement: 10,200 tons
- Length: 460 ft (140 m)
- Beam: 34 ft (10.4 m)
- Draft: 32 ft (9.8 m)
- Propulsion: S9G reactor auxiliary diesel engine
- Speed: 25 knots (46 km/h)
- Endurance: can remain submerged for periods in excess of 3 months
- Test depth: greater than 800 ft (244 m)
- Complement: 15 officers; 120 enlisted men
- Armament: 40 VLS tubes (12 forward VPT; 28 in VPM), four 21 inch (530 mm) torpedo tubes for Mk-48 torpedoes BGM-109 Tomahawk

USS Wahoo (SSGN-806), a Block V Virginia-class submarine for the United States Navy, will be the fifth United States Navy submarine to bear the name, beginning with the World War II-era USS Wahoo (SS-238). It was ordered on 2 December 2019. Secretary of the Navy Kenneth Braithwaite officially announced the name on 17 November 2020, in a press release.

== Design ==
Compared to Blocks I-IV of Virginia-class submarines, Block V vessels will incorporate previously introduced modifications to the base design in addition to a Virginia Payload Module (VPM). The VPM inserts a segment into the boat's hull which adds four vertical launch tubes. Each tube allows for the carrying of seven Tomahawk strike missiles, increasing her armament to a total of 40 missiles.
