= USS Miami (SSGN-811) =

Future US Navy attack submarine

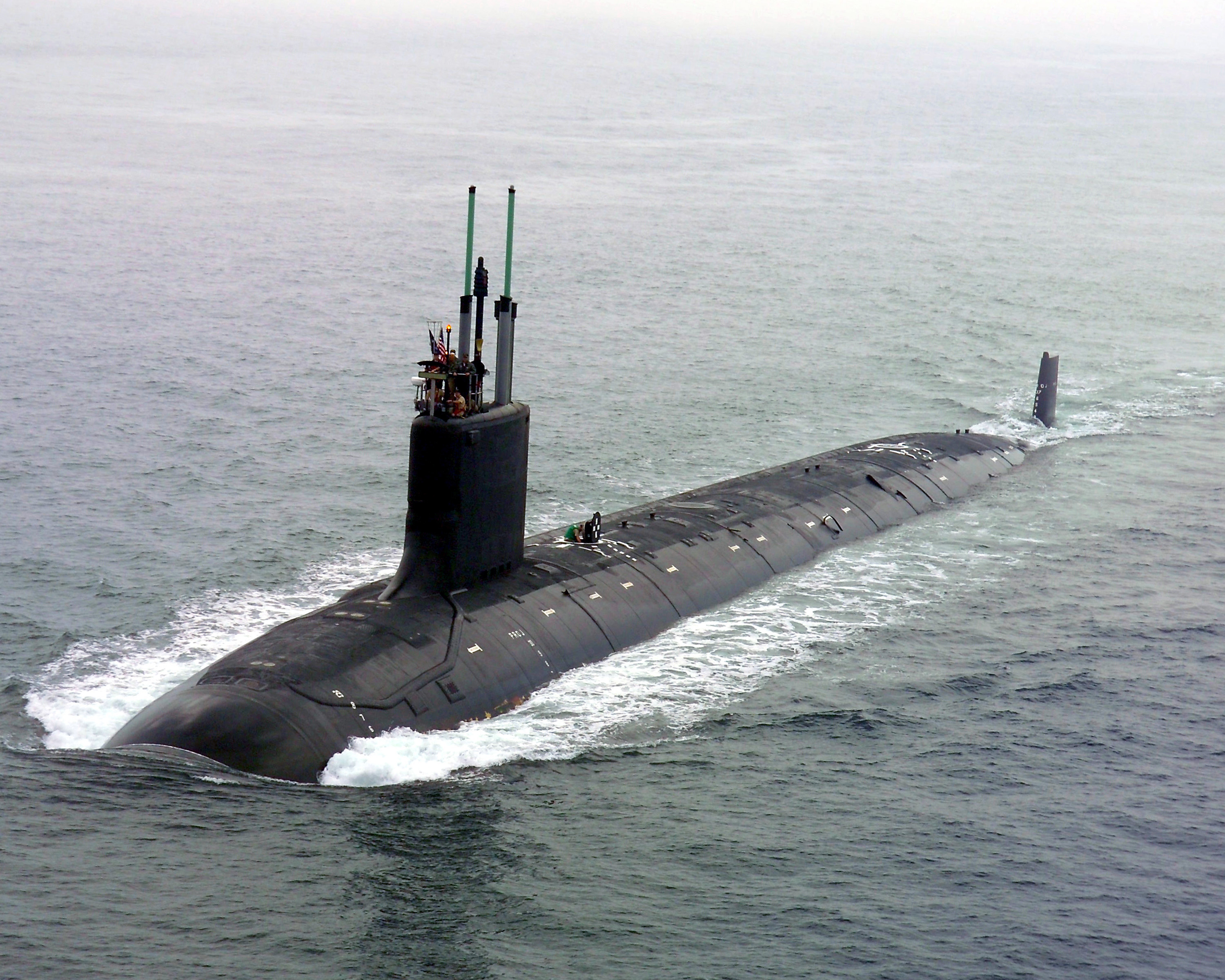
- The lead boat of the Virginia class, USS Virginia (SSN-774)

History

United States
- Name: Miami
- Namesake: Miami, Florida
- Ordered: March 2023
- Builder: General Dynamics Electric Boat
- Cost: $2.4 Billion (2021)
- Sponsored by: Gloria Estefan
- Identification: SSGN-811
- Status: Announced

General characteristics
- Class & type: Virginia-class submarine
- Displacement: 10,200 tons
- Length: 460 ft (140 m)
- Beam: 34 ft (10.4 m)
- Draft: 32 ft (9.8 m)
- Propulsion: S9G reactor, auxiliary diesel engine
- Speed: 25 knots (46 km/h)
- Endurance: can remain submerged for more than 3 months
- Test depth: greater than 800 ft (244 m)
- Complement: 15 officers; 120 enlisted crew
- Armament: 40 VLS tubes (12 forward VPT; 28 in VPM), four 21 inch (530 mm) torpedo tubes for Mk-48 torpedoes BGM-109 Tomahawk

USS Miami (SSGN-811) will be a Virginia-class nuclear-powered attack submarine of the United States Navy, the tenth of the Block V boats and the 38th of her class overall.

The submarine was ordered in March 2021 for $2.4 billion. Her name was announced on 8 May 2024 by Secretary of the Navy Carlos Del Toro during the Miami Fleet Week with city native and singer Gloria Estefan as her sponsor.

== Design ==
Compared to Blocks I-IV of the Virginia-class submarines, Block V vessels will incorporate previously introduced modifications to the base design in addition to a Virginia Payload Module (VPM). The VPM inserts a segment into the boat's hull which adds four vertical launch tubes. Each tube allows for the carrying of seven Tomahawk strike missiles, increasing her armament to a total of 40 missiles.

Her namesake Miami has been carried by four ships of the US Navy, most recently on USS Miami (SSN-755), a Los Angeles-class attack submarine that was decommissioned earlier than planned after she was set on fire in 2014.
