= USS Norfolk (SSGN-815) =

US Navy Virginia-class submarine

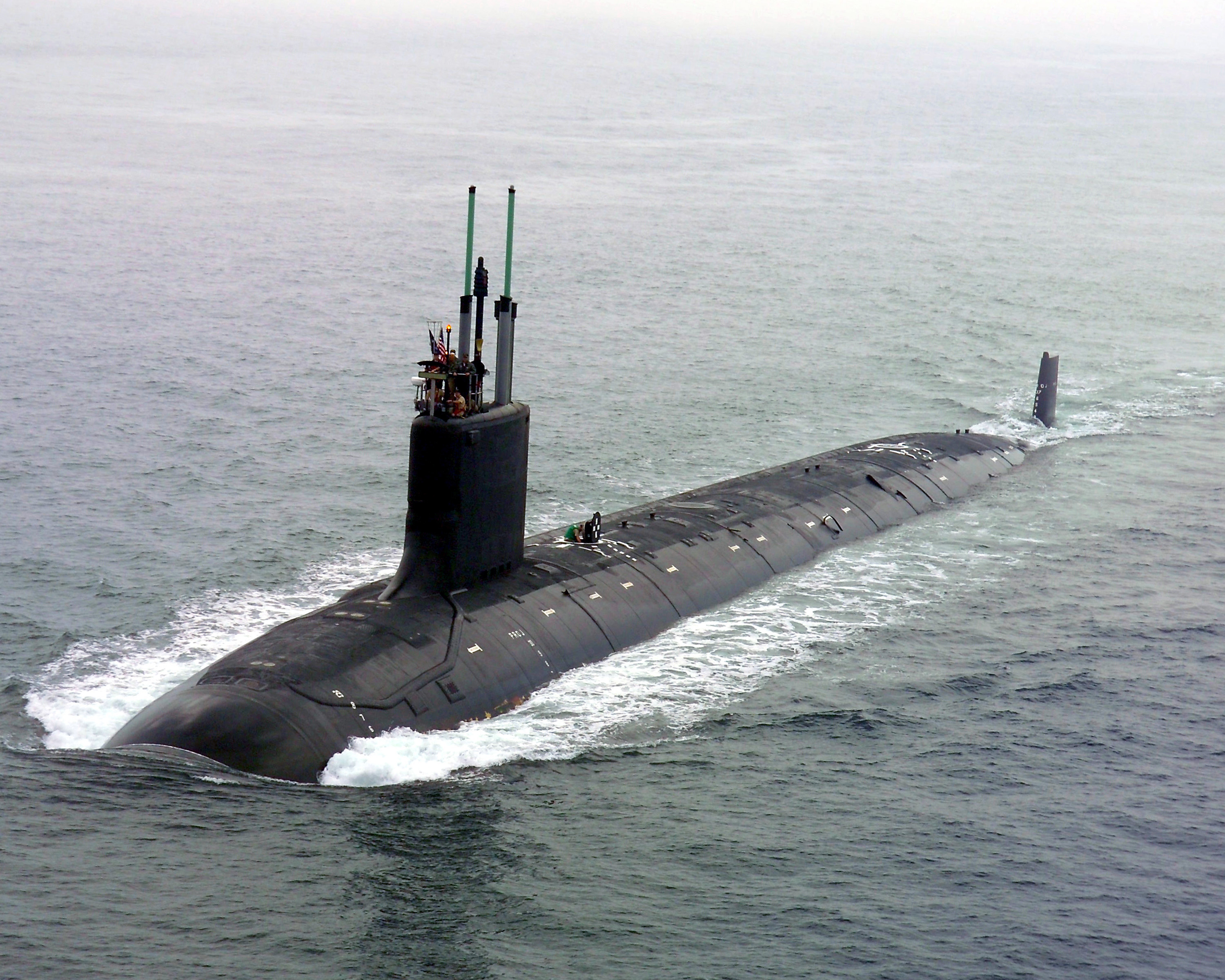
- The lead boat of the Virginia class, USS Virginia (SSN-774)

History

United States
- Name: Norfolk
- Namesake: Norfolk, Virginia
- Ordered: TBD
- Identification: Pennant number:SSGN-815

General characteristics
- Class & type: Virginia-class submarine
- Displacement: 10,200 tons
- Length: 460 ft (140 m)
- Beam: 34 ft (10.4 m)
- Draft: 32 ft (9.8 m)
- Propulsion: S9G reactor, auxiliary diesel engine
- Speed: 25 knots (46 km/h)
- Endurance: can remain submerged for more than 3 months
- Test depth: greater than 800 ft (244 m)
- Complement: 15 officers; 120 enlisted crew
- Armament: 40 VLS tubes; four 21 inch (530 mm) torpedo tubes for Mk-48 torpedoes or BGM-109 Tomahawk

USS Norfolk (SSGN-815) will be a nuclear-powered Virginia-class submarine of the United States Navy, the second Block VI attack submarine and 42nd overall of her class. She will be the fourth US Navy ship to bear the name Norfolk, the name previously belonged to a Los Angeles-class submarine.

Uniquely, Norfolk was not ordered prior to her naming due to a dispute between the Navy and builder Huntington Ingalls Industries over the potential cost.

Anne Holton, wife of prominent Virginia Senator Tim Kaine, was named as the ship's sponsor.

== Design ==
Like their Block V predecessors, Block VI submarines will incorporate previously introduced modifications to the base design in addition to a Virginia Payload Module (VPM). The VPM inserts a segment into the boat's hull which adds four vertical launch tubes. Each tube allows for the carrying of seven Tomahawk strike missiles, increasing her armament to a total of 40 missiles.
