= USS Delaware (SSN-791) =

US Navy Virginia-class submarine

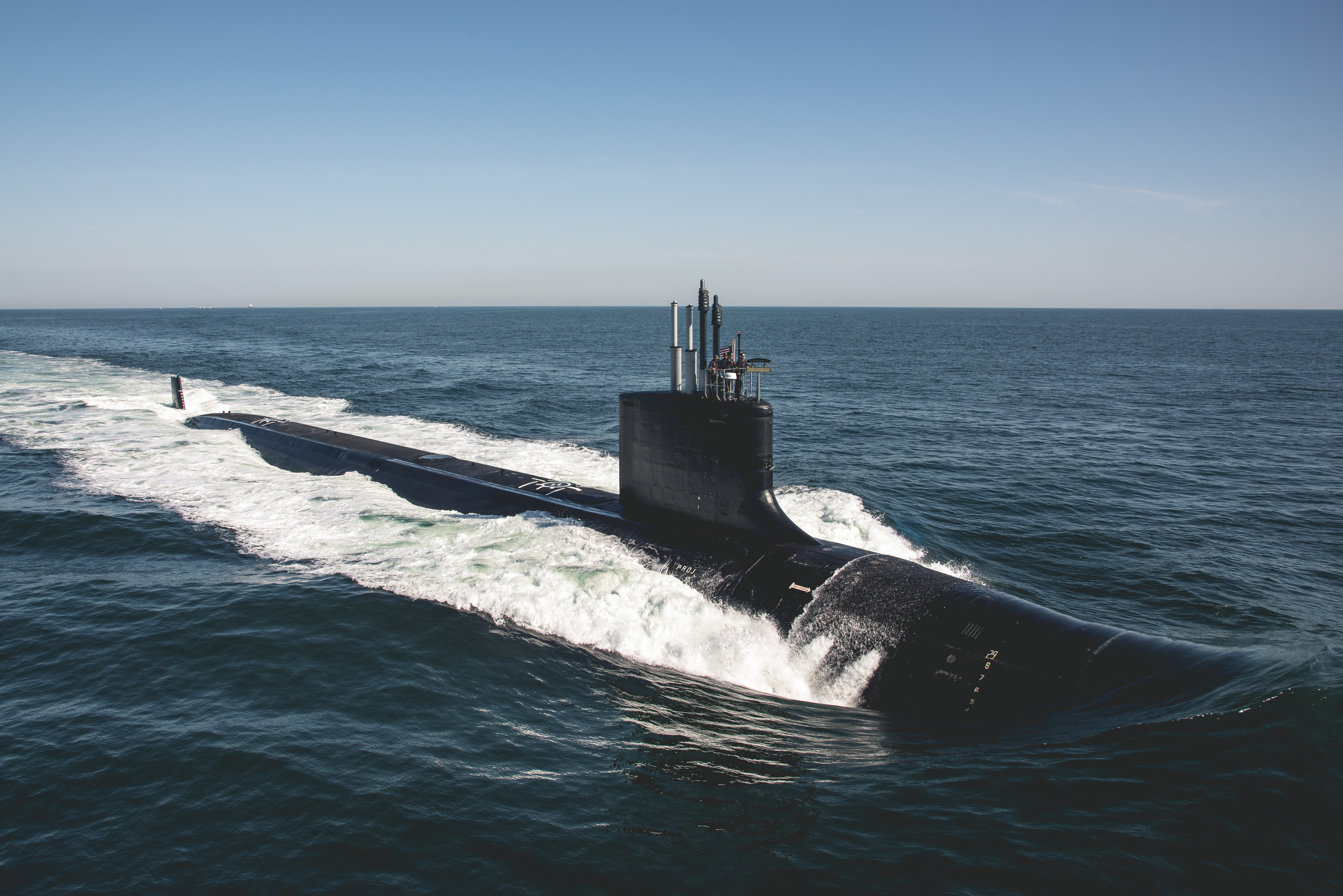
- Delaware underway during her builder's sea trials

History

United States
- Name: USS Delaware
- Namesake: State of Delaware
- Awarded: 22 December 2008
- Builder: Newport News Shipbuilding
- Laid down: 30 April 2016
- Launched: 14 December 2018
- Sponsored by: Jill Biden
- Christened: 20 October 2018
- Acquired: 25 October 2019
- Commissioned: 4 April 2020
- Home port: Groton, Connecticut
- Status: In active service

General characteristics
- Class & type: Virginia-class attack submarine
- Displacement: 7800 tons light, 7800 tons full
- Length: 114.9 m (377 ft)
- Beam: 10.3 m (34 ft)
- Propulsion: 1 × S9G PWR nuclear reactor 280,000 shp (210 MW), HEU 93%; 2 × steam turbines 40,000 shp (30 MW); 1 × single shaft pump-jet propulsor; 1 × secondary propulsion motor
- Speed: 25 knots (46 km/h; 29 mph)
- Range: Essentially unlimited distance; 33 years
- Test depth: greater than 800 ft (240 m)
- Complement: 134 (14 officers, 120 enlisted)

External videos
- on Huntington Ingalls Industries Official YouTube Channel(in English)
- Delaware (SSN 791) Delivered to U.S. Navy on YouTube

USS Delaware (SSN-791) is a Virginia-class attack submarine built for the United States Navy. The contract to build her was awarded to Huntington Ingalls Industries in partnership with the Electric Boat division of General Dynamics in Newport News, Virginia on 22 December 2008. This boat is the eighth and final of the Block III submarines that feature a revised bow, including some technology from Ohio-class SSGNs. Construction on Delaware began in September 2013. She was christened on 20 October 2018. She was commissioned administratively after the standard commissioning ceremony was cancelled due to public health concerns over the COVID-19 coronavirus pandemic. Delaware was the first ever US ship commissioned while underwater. The official commissioning ceremony occurred 2 April 2022 at the Port of Wilmington, Delaware.

== Design, complement ==
USS Delaware is 377 feet (115 m) long, 33 feet (10 m) wide, has a maximum draft of 32 feet (9.8 m) and displaces 7,800 tonnes (7,700 long tons; 8,600 short tons). She is propelled by nuclear power, has a single semi-pump jet style propulsor unit, and a complement of 15 officers and 117 enlisted crew members.

== AUKUS ==
The Delaware is likely to be one of the two extant vessels, and three submarines total (one new build submarine will also be transferred once built), to be transferred to the Australian Defence Force as part of the first stage of the flagship AUKUS submarine partnership between the US, Australia and the United Kingdom.
