= Virginia-class submarine =

US Navy fast attack submarine class

- Virginia-class SSN profile

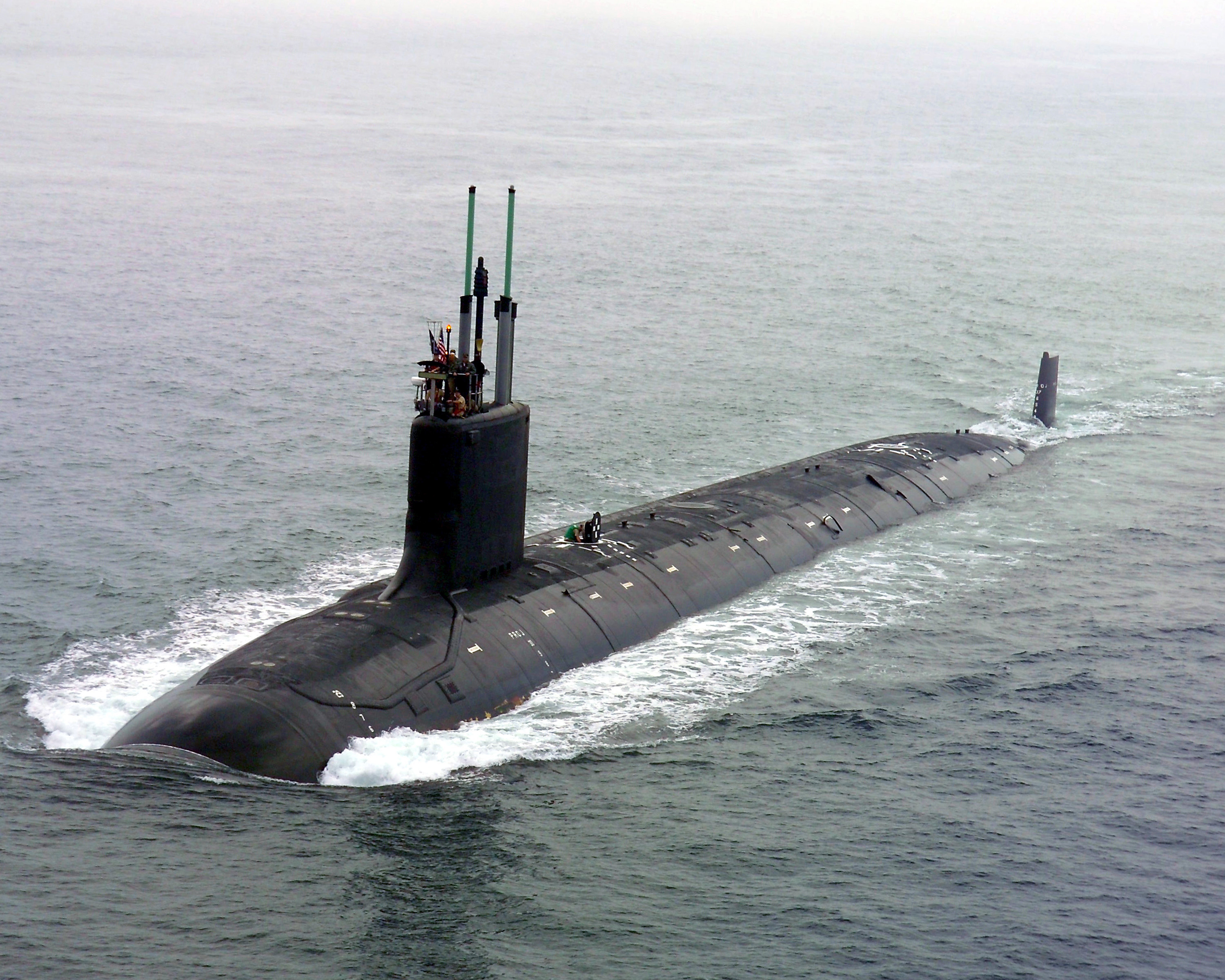
- USS Virginia underway in July 2004

Class overview
- Builders: Electric Boat; Newport News Shipbuilding
- Operators: United States Navy; Royal Australian Navy (planned)
- Preceded by: Seawolf class; Ohio class (cruise missile submarine variant)
- Succeeded by: SSN(X) class
- Cost: $2.8 billion per unit (2019); $4.3 billion per unit w/VPM (2023)
- Built: 2000–present
- In commission: 2004–present
- Planned: US Navy: 45; Royal Australian Navy: 3 (3 block IV second-hand) + option for 2 more
- On order: 4; (Block V)
- Building: 8; (2 block IV, 6 block V)
- Completed: 26; (4 block I, 6 block II, 8 block III, 8 block IV)
- Canceled: 0
- Active: 26; (4 block I, 6 block II, 8 block III, 8 block IV)

General characteristics
- Type: Nuclear-powered attack submarine (SSN)
- Displacement: Submerged: Block I–IV: 7,900 t (8,700 short tons); Block V: 10,200 t (11,200 short tons)
- Length: 377 ft (115 m); 460 ft (140 m) for Block V
- Beam: 34 ft (10 m)
- Propulsion: 1 × S9G nuclear reactor 280,000 hp (210 MW); 2 × steam turbines 40,000 shp (30 MW); 1 × single shaft pump-jet propulsor; 1 × secondary propulsion motor
- Speed: 25 knots (46 km/h; 29 mph) or over
- Range: Unlimited
- Endurance: Only limited by food and maintenance requirements.
- Test depth: Over 800 ft (240 m)
- Complement: 135 (15 officers; 120 enlisted)
- Armament: Block I–II: 12 × vertically launched missiles: 12 × VLS tubes (for Tomahawk cruise missiles); 25 × torpedo tube launched torpedoes & missiles: 4 × 21" torpedo tubes (for Mk-48 torpedoes or UGM-84 Harpoon missiles); Block III–IV: 12 × vertically launched missiles: 2 × Virginia payload tubes, each capable of launching six cruise missiles (12 × Tomahawk BGM-109); 25 × torpedo tube launched torpedoes & missiles: 4 × 21" torpedo tubes for Mk-48 torpedoes or UGM-84 Harpoon missiles; Block V-VI: 40 × vertically launched missiles: 4 × Virginia payload modules (VPM), each capable of launching seven cruise missiles (28 × Tomahawk BGM-109 and future guided cruise missiles); 2 × Virginia payload tubes, each capable of launching six cruise missiles (12 × Tomahawk BGM-109); 25 × torpedo tube launched torpedoes & missiles: 4 × 21" torpedo tubes for Mk-48 torpedoes or UGM-84 Harpoon missiles

The Virginia class, or the SSN-774 class, is a class of nuclear-powered attack submarines with vertical launching system-launched cruise missile capability in service with the United States Navy. The class is designed for a broad spectrum of open-ocean and littoral missions, including antisubmarine warfare and intelligence-gathering operations. They are scheduled to replace older Los Angeles-class attack submarines, many of which have already been decommissioned, as well as four cruise missile submarine variants of the Ohio-class submarines. Upon the 25 July 2025 decommissioning of the Los Angeles-class submarine USS Helena (SSN-725), the Virginia class became the most numerous active submarine class in the world.

The Virginia class is built through an industrial arrangement designed to maintain both General Dynamics Electric Boat and Newport News Shipbuilding, the only two U.S. shipyards capable of building nuclear-powered submarines. Under the present arrangement, the Newport News facility builds the stern, habitability, machinery spaces, torpedo room, sail, and bow, while Electric Boat builds the engine room and control room. The facilities alternate work on the reactor plant, as well as the final assembly, test, outfit, and delivery.

Virginia-class submarines will be acquired through 2043, and are expected to remain in service until at least 2060, with later submarines expected to operate into the 2070s.

On 14 March 2023, the trilateral Australian-British-American security pact known as AUKUS announced that the Royal Australian Navy would purchase three Virginia-class submarines as a stopgap measure between the retirement of their conventionally powered Collins-class submarines and the acquisition of the future SSN-AUKUS-class submarines. If SSN-AUKUS falls behind schedule, Australia will have the option of purchasing two additional Virginia-class submarines.

== History ==
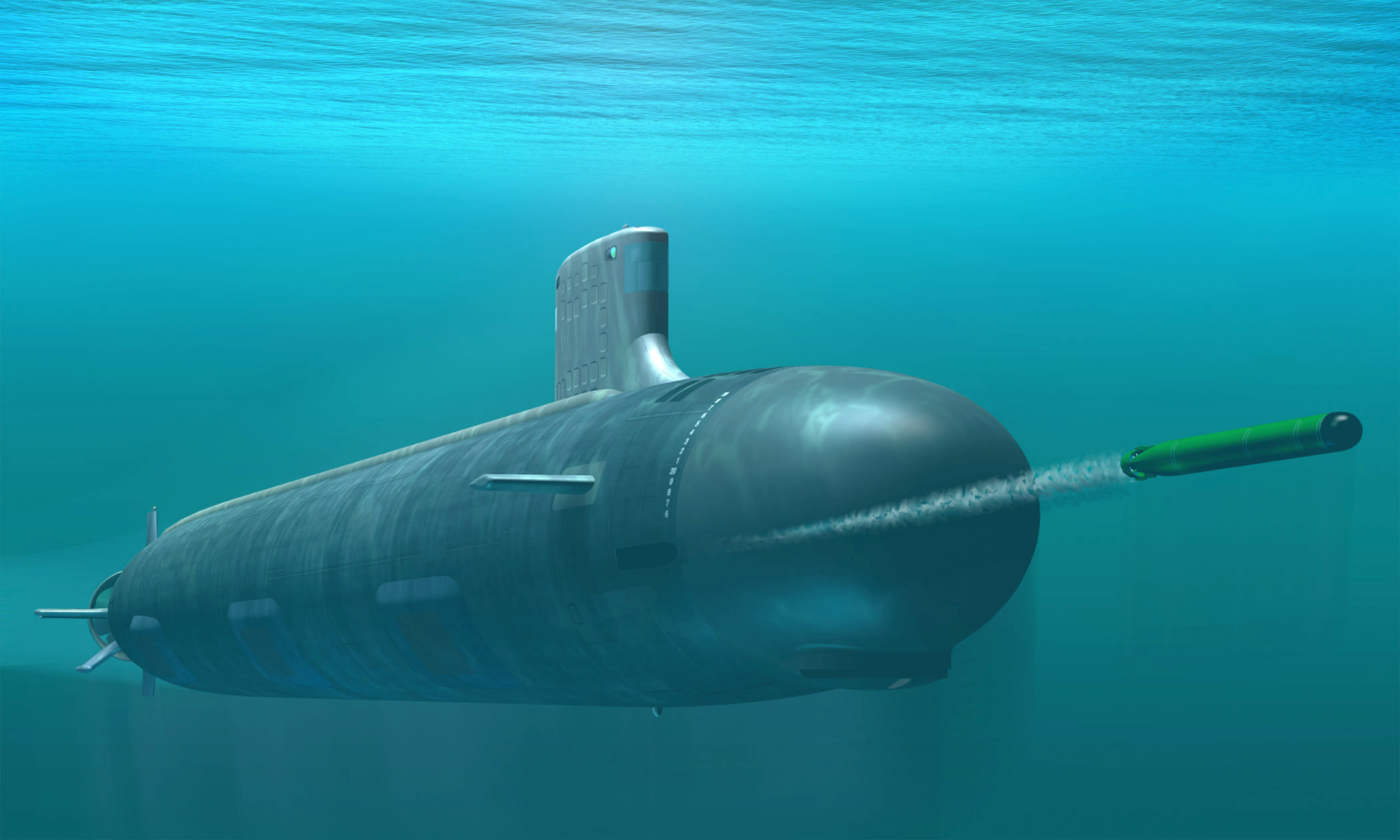
Rendering of a Virginia-class attack submarine

The class was developed under the codename Centurion, later renamed New SSN. The "Centurion Study" was initiated in February 1991. The Virginia-class submarine was the first US Navy warship with its development coordinated using such three-dimensional (3D) visualization technology as CATIA, which comprises computer-aided engineering, computer-aided design, computer-aided manufacturing, and product lifecycle management. Design problems—and maintenance problems for the Navy—ensued, nonetheless.

The Virginia class was intended in part as a less expensive alternative to the Seawolf-class submarine ($1.8 billion vs $2.8 billion), whose production run was canceled after just three boats had been completed. To reduce costs, the Virginia-class submarines use many "commercial off-the-shelf" components, especially in their computers and data networks. In 2001, Newport News Shipbuilding and General Dynamics Electric Boat built a quarter-scale version of a Virginia-class submarine dubbed Large Scale Vehicle II Cutthroat. The vehicle was designed as an affordable test platform for new technologies. By 2007, about 35 million labor hours had been spent to design the Virginia class. Constructing a single Virginia-class submarine has required around nine million labor hours, and over 4,000 suppliers. Each submarine is projected to make 14–15 deployments during her 33-year service life.

To get the submarine's price down to $2 billion each in fiscal year 2005 (FY-05) dollars, the Navy instituted a cost-reduction program to shave off about $400 million of each submarine's price tag. The project was dubbed "2 for 4 in 12", referring to the Navy's desire to buy two boats for $4 billion in FY-12. Under pressure from Congress, the Navy opted to start buying two boats per year in FY-11, meaning that officials would not be able to get the $2 billion price tag before the service started buying two submarines per year. However, program manager Dave Johnson said at a conference on 19 March 2008 that the program was only $30 million away from achieving the $2 billion price goal and would reach that target on schedule. Improvements in shipbuilding technology have trimmed production costs below the $1.8 billion projected fiscal year 2009 dollars.

The Virginia-class Program Office received the David Packard Excellence in Acquisition Award in 1996, 1998, and 2008 "for excelling in four specific award criteria: reducing life-cycle costs; making the acquisition system more efficient, responsive, and timely; integrating defense with the commercial base and practices; and promoting continuous improvement of the acquisition process".

In December 2008, the Navy signed a $14 billion contract with General Dynamics and Northrop Grumman to supply eight submarines. The contract required the delivery of one submarine in each of FY-09 and FY-10, and two submarines in each of FY-11, FY-12, and FY-13. This contract was designed to bring the Navy's Virginia-class fleet to 18 submarines. In December 2010, the United States Congress passed a defense authorization bill that expanded production to two submarines per year. Two submarine-per-year production resumed on 2 September 2011 with commencement of Washington (SSN-787) construction.

On 21 June 2008, the Navy christened USS New Hampshire, the first Block II submarine. This boat was delivered eight months ahead of schedule and $54 million under budget. Block II boats are built in four sections, compared to the 10 sections of the Block I boats. This enables a cost saving of about $300 million per boat, reducing the overall cost to $2 billion per boat and the construction of two new boats per year. Beginning in 2010, new submarines of this class were to have included a software system that can monitor and reduce their electromagnetic signatures when needed.

The first full-duration, six-month deployment was successfully carried out from 15 October 2009 to 13 April 2010. Authorization of full-rate production and the declaration of full operational capability was achieved five months later. In September 2010, urethane tiles, applied to the hull to dampen internal sound and absorb rather than reflect sonar pulses, were found to be falling off while the boats were at sea. Admiral Kevin McCoy announced that the problems with the mold-in-place special hull treatment for the early boats had been fixed in 2011, then Minnesota was built and found to have the same problem.

In 2013, just as two-per-year construction was supposed to commence, Congress failed to resolve the United States fiscal cliff, forcing the Navy to attempt to "de-obligate" construction funds.

In April 2019, the CRS reported that the Navy estimated the cost of a boat was $2.8 billion. In July 2023, the CRS reported that the Navy estimates at the present production rate of two boats per year that the cost per boat when equipped with the additional Virginia payload module midbody section was $4.3 billion.

On 14 September 2023, at a Senate confirmation hearing, Admiral Lisa Franchetti said that the Navy would have to work with builders to raise the rate of production from 1.2/year to 2.2/year to meet the AUKUS target. However, on 30 May 2026, the three vessels due for Australia in the 2030s, which would have been two second-hand of Block IV and one new of Block VII, were announced to be all second-hand of Block IV.

== Innovations ==
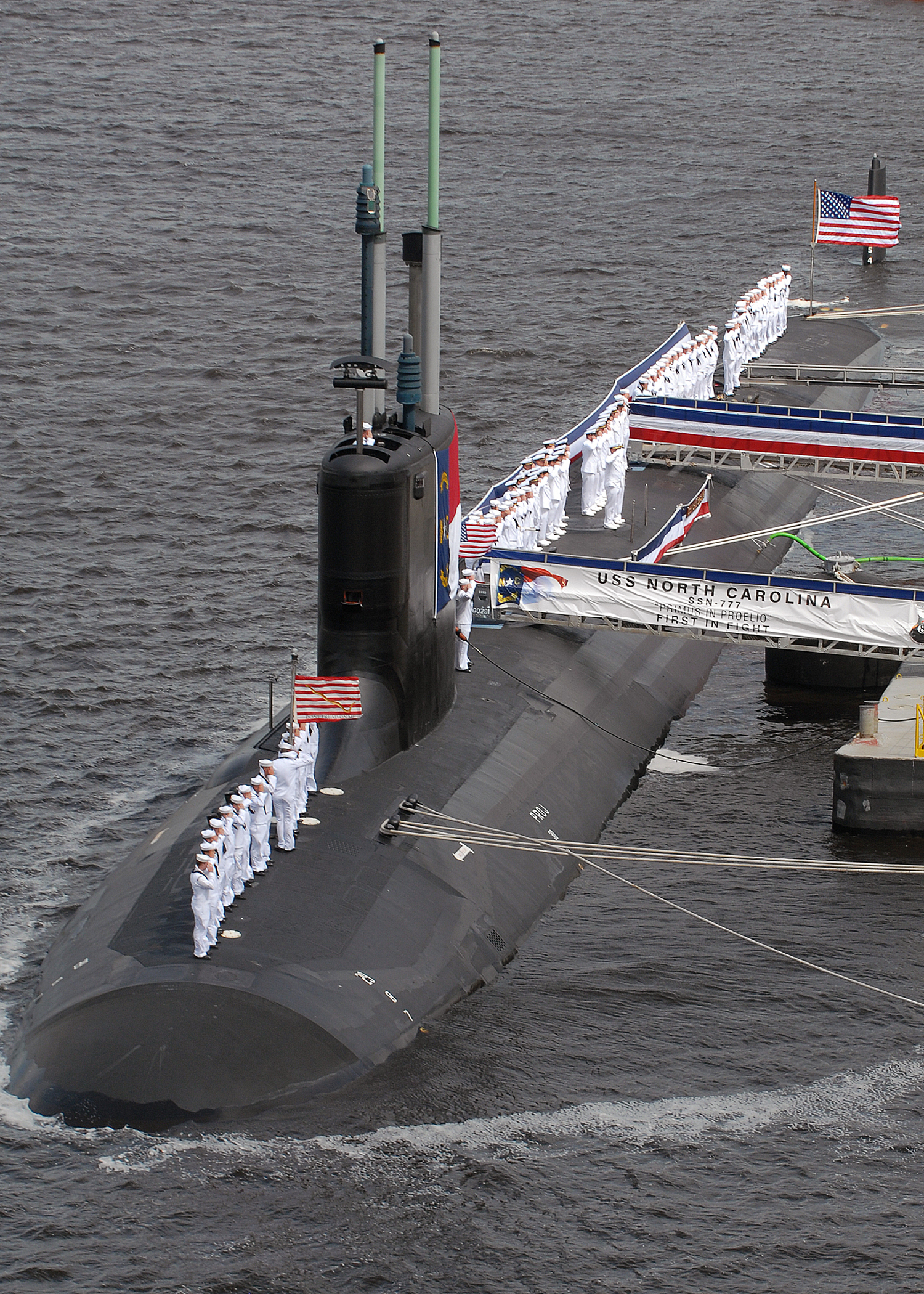
USS North Carolina, the last Block I boat, at her commissioning ceremony: Her advanced masts are visible in this image.

The Virginia class incorporates several innovations not found in previous US submarine classes.

=== Technology barriers ===
Because of the low rate of Virginia production, the Navy entered into a program with DARPA to overcome technology barriers to lower the cost of attack submarines so that more could be built, to maintain the size of the fleet.

These include:

- Propulsion concepts not constrained by a centerline shaft
- Externally stowed and launched weapons (especially torpedoes)
- Conformal alternatives to the existing spherical sonar array
- Technologies that eliminate or substantially simplify existing submarine hull, mechanical, and electrical systems
- Automation to reduce crew workload for standard tasks

=== Unified modular masts ===
Virginia-class subs are the first class where all masts share common design – the universal modular mast (UMM) designed by L3 KEO (previously Kollmorgen). Shared components have been maximized and some design choices are also shared between different masts. The first UMM was installed on USS Memphis, a Los Angeles-class submarine. The UMM is an integrated system for housing, erecting, and supporting submarine mast-mounted antennae and sensors. The UMMs are the following:

- Snorkel mast
- Two photonic masts
- Two communication masts
- One or two high-data-rate satellite communication masts, built by Raytheon, enabling communication at super high frequency (for downlink) and extremely high frequency (for uplink) range
- Radar mast (carrying AN/BPS-16 surface search and navigation radar)
- Electronic warfare mast (AN/BLQ-10 Electronic Support Measures) used to detect, analyze, and identify both radar and communication signals from ships, aircraft, submarines, and land-based transmitters

=== Photonics masts ===
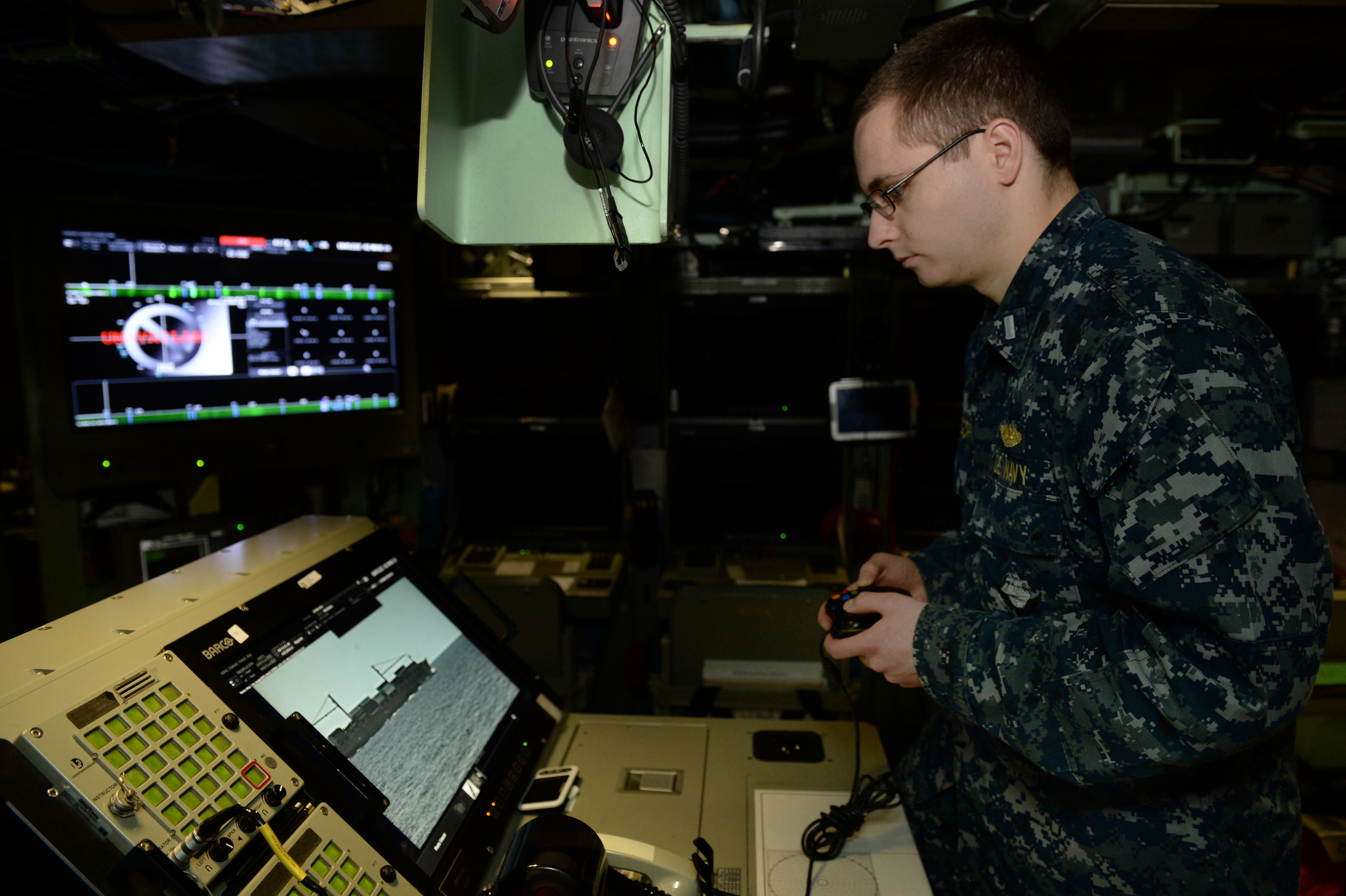
A sailor is using an Xbox 360 controller to control the photonic masts of USS Colorado in 2018, the first submarine to use this Xbox controller.

The Virginia class is the first to use photonic sensors instead of a traditional periscope. The class is equipped with high-resolution cameras, along with light-intensification and infrared sensors, an infrared laser rangefinder, and an integrated electronic support measures array. Two redundant sets of these sensors are mounted on two AN/BVS-1 photonics masts located outside the pressure hull. Signals from the masts' sensors are transmitted through optical fiber data lines through signal processors to the control center. Visual feeds from the masts are displayed on liquid-crystal display interfaces in the command center.

The design of earlier optical periscopes required them to penetrate the pressure hull, reducing its structural integrity, as well as increasing the risk of flooding, and also required the submarine's control room to be located directly below the sail/fin. Implementation of photonics masts (which do not penetrate the pressure hull) enabled the submarine control room to be relocated to a position inside the pressure hull, which is not necessarily directly below the sail.

The current photonics masts have a visual appearance so different from ordinary periscopes that when the submarine is detected, it can be distinctly identified as a Virginia-class vessel. As a result, current photonic masts will be replaced with low-profile photonics masts, which resemble traditional submarine periscopes more closely.

In the future, a nonrotational affordable modular panoramic photonics mast may be fitted, enabling the submarine to obtain a simultaneous 360° view of the sea surface.

=== Propulsor ===
In contrast to a traditional bladed propeller, the Virginia class uses pump-jet propulsors by BAE Systems, originally developed for the Royal Navy's Swiftsure-class submarines. The propulsor significantly reduces the risks of cavitation and allows quieter operation.

=== Improved sonar systems ===
Sonar arrays aboard Virginia-class submarines have an open-system architecture, which enables rapid insertion of new hardware and software as they become available. Hardware upgrades (dubbed technology insertions) are usually carried out every four years, while software updates (dubbed advanced processor builds) are carried out every two years. Virginia-class submarines feature several types of sonar arrays.

- BQQ-10 bow-mounted spherical active/passive sonar array (large-aperture bow (LAB) sonar array from SSN-784 onward)
- A wide-aperture, lightweight fiber-optic sonar array, consisting of three flat panels mounted low along either side of the hull
- Two high-frequency active sonars are mounted in the sail and bow, with the chin-mounted (below the bow) and sail-mounted high-frequency sonars supplementing the (spherical/LAB) main sonar array, enabling safer operations in coastal waters, enhancing under-ice navigation, and improving anti-submarine warfare performance.
- A low-cost conformal array high-frequency sonar is mounted on both sides of the submarine's sail to provide coverage above and behind the submarine.

Virginia-class submarines are also equipped with both a low-frequency and a high-frequency towed sonar array.

- TB-16 or TB-34 fat-line tactical towed sonar array
- TB-29 or TB-33 thin-line long-range search towed sonar array

=== Rescue equipment ===
- Submarine Escape Immersion Equipment MK11 suit(s) that enable ascent from a sunken submarine (maximum ascent depth 600 feet (180 m))
- Lithium hydroxide canisters that remove carbon dioxide from the submarine's atmosphere
- Submarine Emergency Position Indicating Radio Beacon (SEPIRB)

=== Virginia Payload Module ===
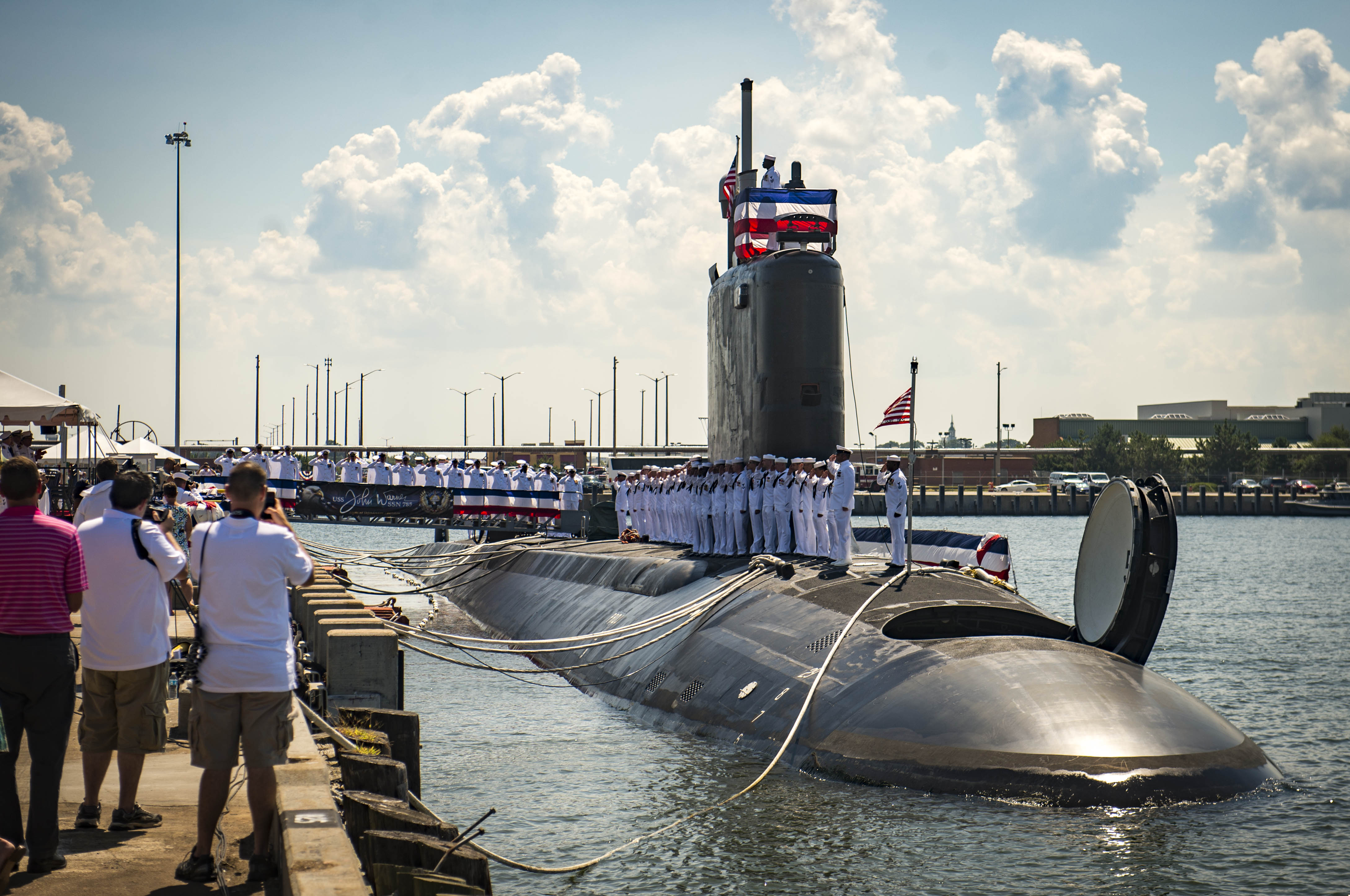
USS John Warner at her commissioning ceremony on 1 August 2015, with forward Virginia Payload Tube hatch open

The Block III submarines have two multipurpose Virginia Payload Tubes (VPT) replacing the dozen single purpose cruise missile launch tubes.

The Block V submarines built from 2019 onward will have an additional Virginia Payload Module (VPM) mid-body section, increasing their overall length. The VPM will add four more VPTs of the same diameter and greater height, located on the centerline, carrying up to seven Tomahawk missiles apiece, that would replace some of the capabilities lost when the SSGN conversion Ohio-class submarines are retired from the fleet. Initially eight payload tubes/silos were planned but this was later rejected in favor of four tubes installed in a 70-foot (21 m) long module between the operations compartment and the propulsion spaces.

The VPM could potentially carry (non-nuclear) medium-range ballistic missiles. Adding the VPM would increase the cost of each submarine by $500 million (2012 prices). This additional cost would be offset by reducing the total submarine force by four boats. More recent reports state that as a cost reduction measure the VPM would carry only Tomahawk SLCM and possibly unmanned undersea vehicles (UUV) with the new price tag now estimated at $360–380 million per boat (in 2010 prices). The VPM launch tubes/silos will reportedly be similar in design to the ones planned for the Ohio class replacement. In July 2016 General Dynamics was awarded $19 million for VPM development. In February 2017 General Dynamics was awarded $126 million for long lead time construction of Block V submarines equipped with VPM.

The VPM was designed by General Dynamics Electric Boat; however, manufacturing is undertaken by BWX Technologies and BAE Systems.

In August 2026, it was announced that the VPM-equipped boats would be redesignated SSGN.

=== High-energy laser weapon ===
According to open-source budget documents, Virginia-class submarines are planned to be equipped with a high-energy laser weapon likely to be incorporated into the photonics mast and have a power output of 300–500 kilowatts, based on the submarine's 30 megawatts reactor capacity.

=== Other improved equipment ===
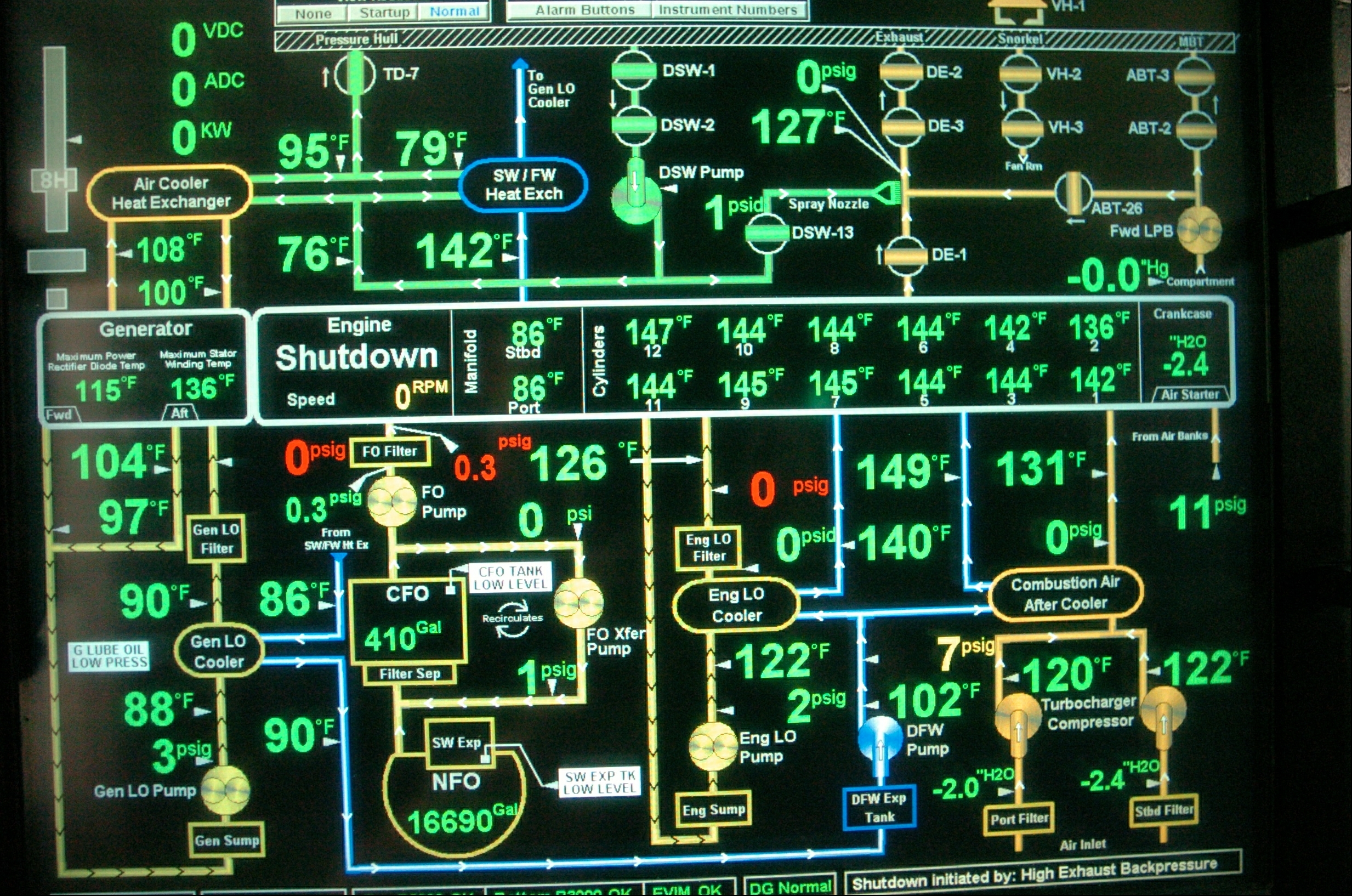
Virginia class diesel generator control panel

- Optical fiber fly-by-wire Ship Control System replaces electro-hydraulic systems for control surface actuation.
- Command and control system module (CCSM) built by Lockheed Martin.
- The auxiliary generator is powered by a Caterpillar model 3512B V-12 marine diesel engine. This replaced the Fairbanks-Morse diesel engine, which would not fit in Virginia's auxiliary machinery room.
- Modernized version of the AN/BSY-1 integrated combat system designated AN/BYG-1 (previously designated CCS Mk2) and built by General Dynamics AIS (previously Raytheon). AN/BYG-1 integrates the submarine Tactical Control System (TCS), Payload Control System (PCS) (formerly Weapon Control System (WCS)), and Information Assurance (IA).
- USS California was the first Virginia-class submarine with the advanced electromagnetic signature reduction system built into it, but this system is being retrofitted into the other submarines of the class.
- Integral 9-man lock-out diving chamber.

== Specifications ==
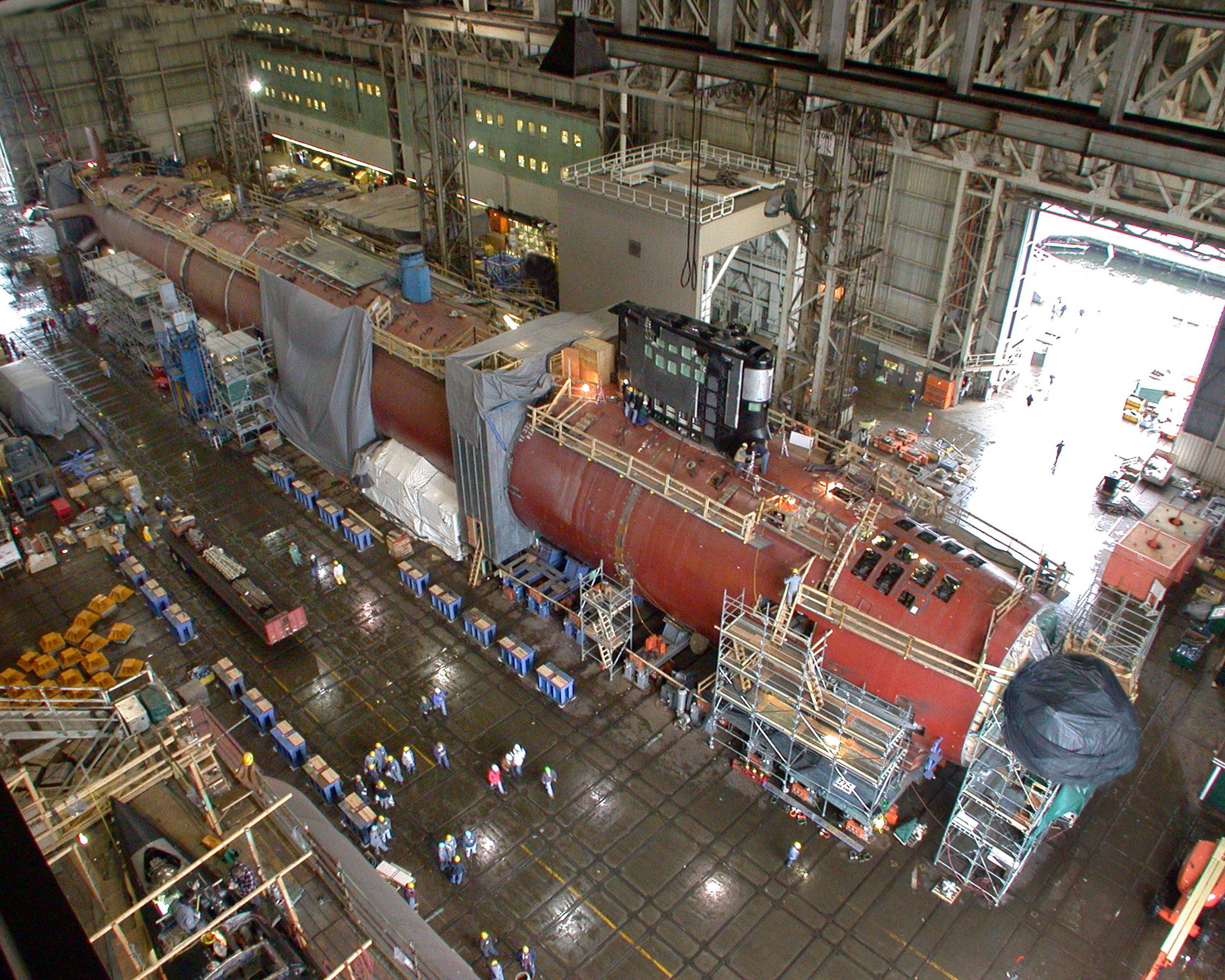
Lead boat Virginia under construction

- Builders: General Dynamics Electric Boat and HII Newport News Shipbuilding
- Length: 377 ft (114.91 m) [Block V: 460 ft (140.2 m)]
- Beam: 34 ft (10.36 m)
- Displacement: 7,800 long tons (7,900 t) [Block V: 10,200 long tons (10,400 t)
- Payload: 40 weapons, special operations forces, unmanned undersea vehicles, Advanced SEAL Delivery System (ASDS) [Block V: 40 Tomahawk cruise missiles]
- Propulsion: S9G nuclear reactor delivering 40,000 shaft horsepower (30 MW). Nuclear core life estimated at 33 years. Nuclear fuel manufactured by BWX Technologies.
- Test depth: greater than 800 ft (240 m), allegedly around 1,600 feet (490 m).
- Speed: Greater than 25 knots (46 km/h; 29 mph), allegedly up to 35 knots (65 km/h; 40 mph)
- Planned cost: about US$1.65 billion each (based on FY95 dollars, 30-boat class and two boat/year build-rate)
- Actual cost: US$1.5 billion (in 1994 prices), US$2.6 billion (in 2012 prices)
- Annual operating cost: $50 million per unit (in 2012 prices)
- Crew: 120 enlisted and 14 officers
- Armament: 12 VLS & four torpedo tubes, capable of launching Mark 48 torpedoes, UGM-109 Tactical Tomahawks, Harpoon missiles and the new advanced mobile mine when it becomes available. Block V boats will have the additional VPM module which contains four large diameter tubes which can accommodate seven Tomahawk cruise missiles each. This would increase the total number of torpedo-sized weapons (such as Tomahawks) carried by the Virginia-class design from about 37 to about 65—an increase of about 76%.
- Decoys: Acoustic Device Countermeasure Mk 3/4

== Blocks ==
=== Block I ===
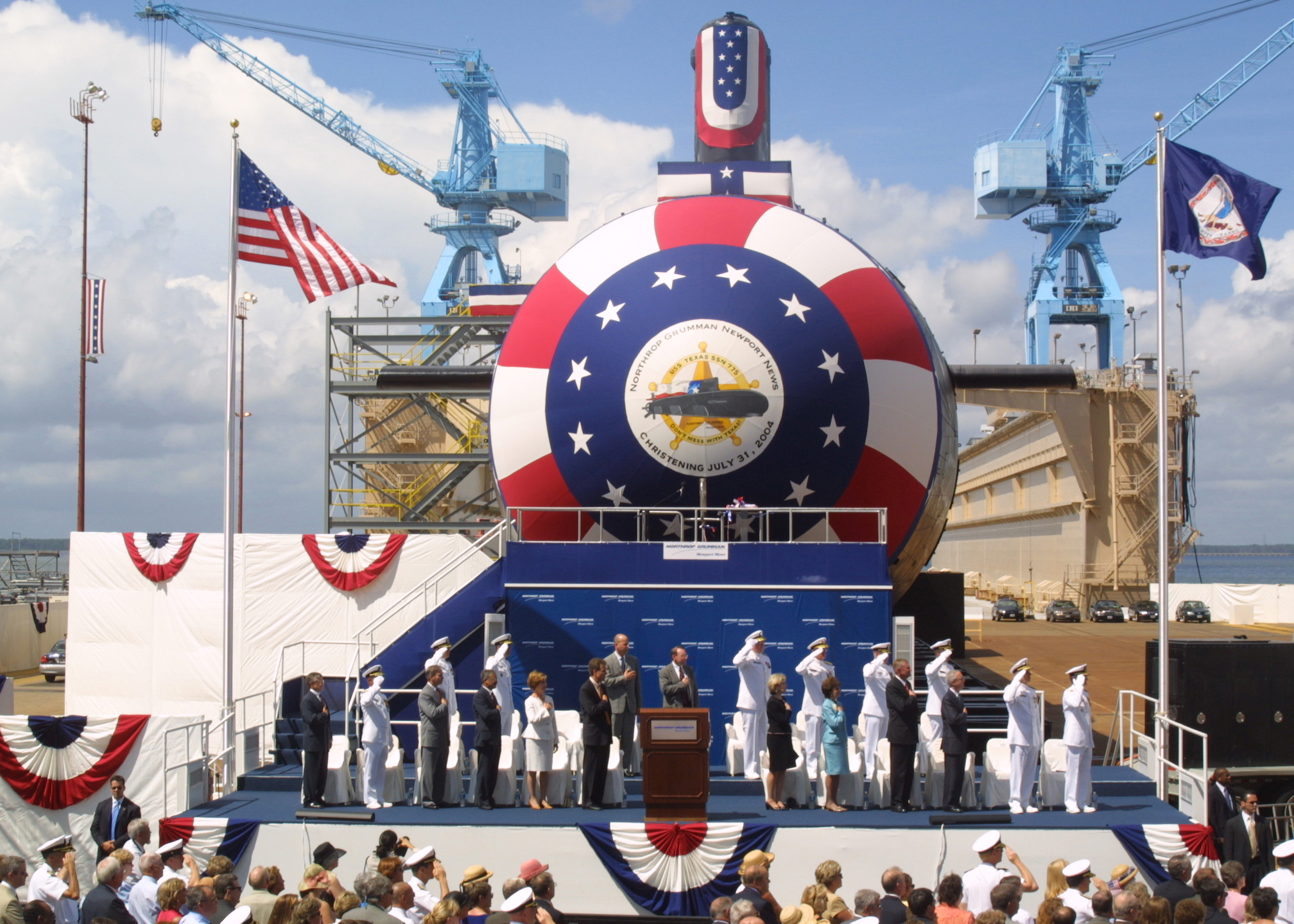
USS Texas, the second Block I boat at her christening ceremony

Block I includes 4 boats and modular construction techniques were incorporated during construction. Earlier submarines (e.g., Los Angeles-class SSNs) were built by assembling the pressure hull and then installing the equipment via cavities in the pressure hull. This required extensive construction activities within the narrow confines of the pressure hull which was time-consuming and dangerous. Modular construction was implemented in an effort to overcome these problems and make the construction process more efficient. Modular construction techniques incorporated during construction include constructing large segments of equipment outside the hull. These segments (dubbed rafts) are then inserted into a hull section (a large segment of the pressure hull). The integrated raft and hull section form a module which, when joined with other modules, forms a Virginia-class submarine. Block I boats were built in 10 modules with each submarine requiring roughly 7 years (84 months) to build.

=== Block II ===
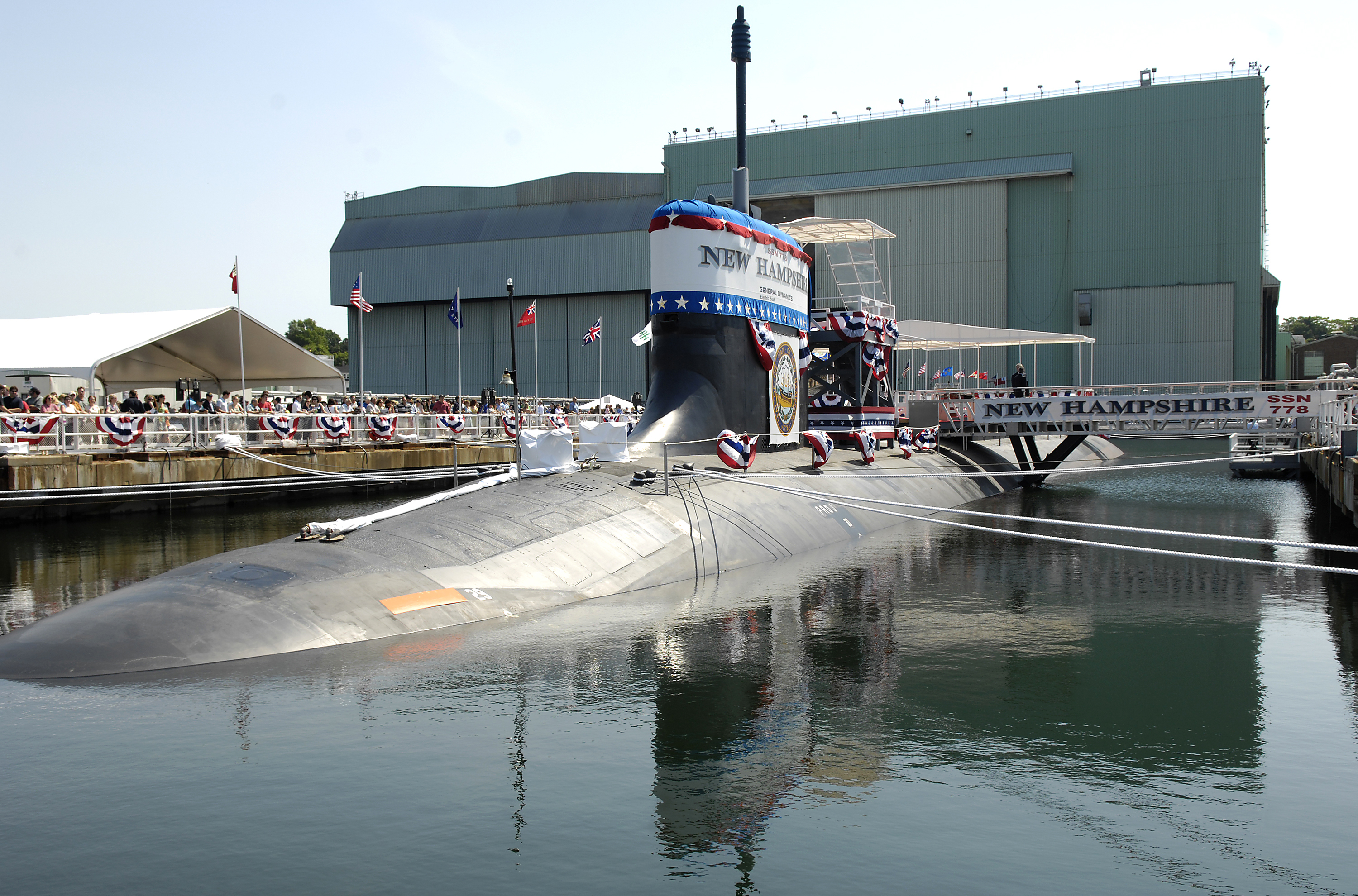
USS New Hampshire, the first of the Block II boats

Block II comprised 6 boats; they were built in four sections rather than ten, saving about $300 million per boat. Block II boats (except the New Hampshire) were also built under a multi-year procurement agreement as opposed to a block-buy contract in Block I, enabling savings in the range of $400 million ($80 million per boat). As a result of improvements in the construction process, New Hampshire (SSN-778) was US$500 million cheaper, required 3.7 million fewer labor hours to build (25% less), thus shortening the construction period by 15 months (20% less) compared to Virginia.

=== Block III ===
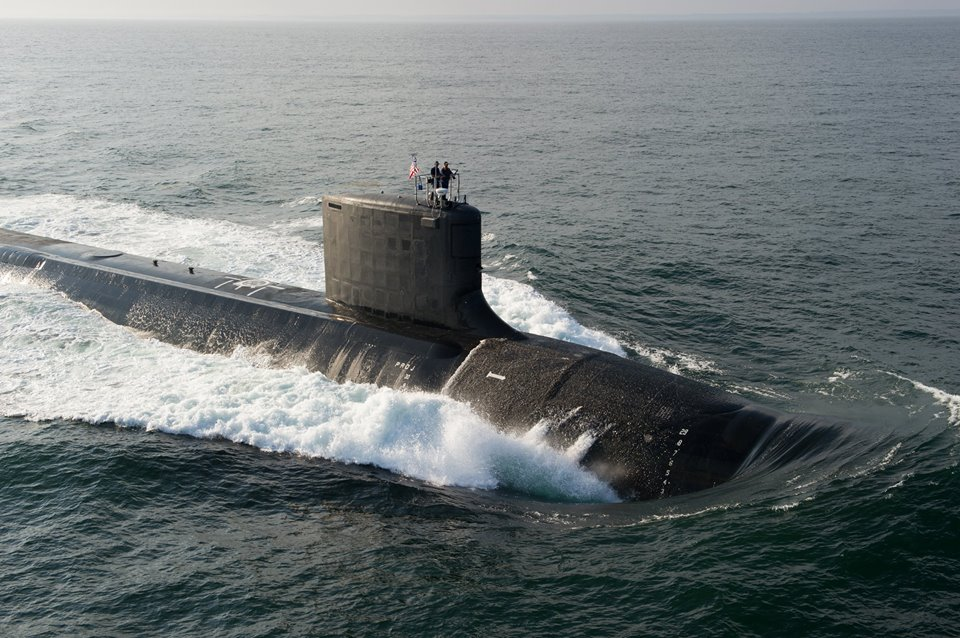
USS North Dakota, the first of the VPT-equipped Block III Virginia-class submarines

Construction of Block III, SSN-784 through SSN-791 (8 boats), began in 2009. Block III subs feature a revised bow with a Large Aperture Bow (LAB) sonar array, as well as technology from Ohio-class SSGNs (2 VLS tubes each containing 6 missiles). The horseshoe-shaped LAB sonar array replaces the spherical main sonar array which has been used on all U.S. Navy SSNs since 1960. The LAB sonar array is water-backed—as opposed to earlier sonar arrays which were air-backed—and consists of a passive array and a medium-frequency active array. Compared to earlier Virginia-class submarines about 40% of the bow has been redesigned.

South Dakota (SSN-790) will be equipped with a new propulsor, possibly the Hybrid Multi-Material Rotor (HMMR), developed by Defense Advanced Research Projects Agency (DARPA). The Hybrid Multi-Material Rotor program is an attempt to improve the design and manufacturing process of submarine propellers with an aim of reducing the cost and weight of the propeller/rotor as well as improving overall acoustic performance.

=== Block IV ===
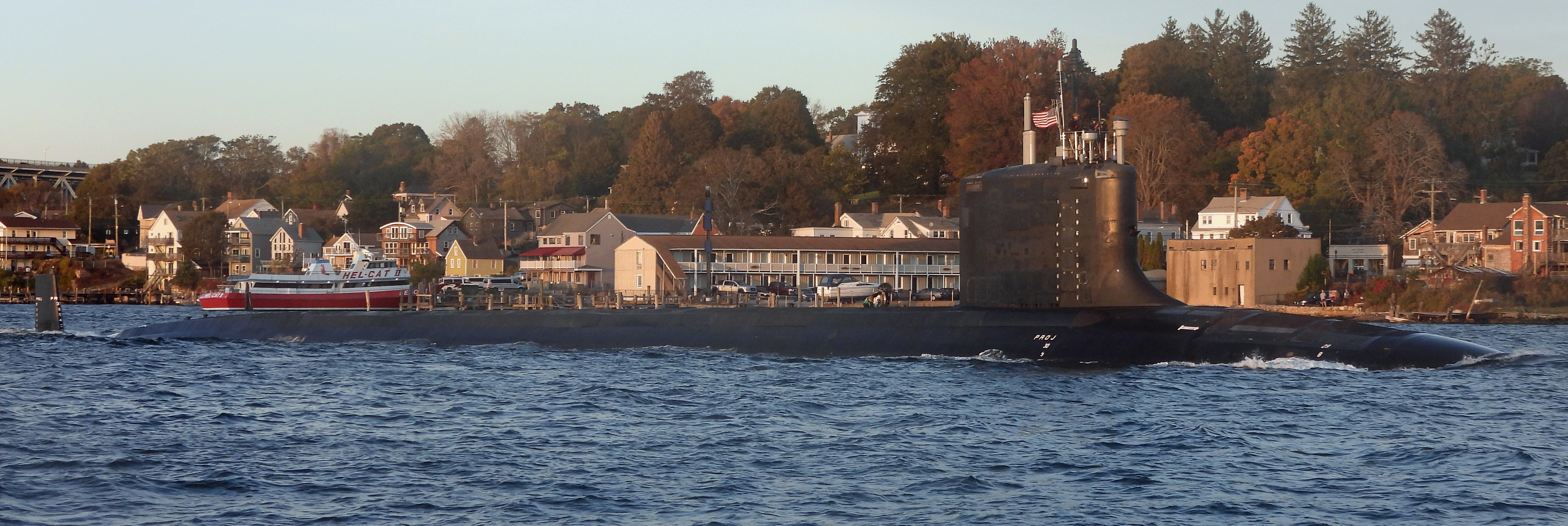
USS Vermont is the first Block IV Virginia-class submarine.

Block IV consists of ten submarines. The 2013 budget sequestration put this ten-submarine in doubt by budget sequestration that same year. The most costly shipbuilding contract in history, worth $17.6 billion, was awarded on 28 April 2014 to General Dynamics Electric Boat. The main improvement over the Block III is the reduction of major maintenance periods from four to three, increasing each boat's total lifetime deployments by one.

The long-lead-time materials contract for SSN-792 was awarded on 17 April 2012, with SSN-793 and SSN-794 following on 28 December 2012. The U.S. Navy has awarded General Dynamics Electric Boat a $208.6 million contract modification for the second fiscal year (FY) 14 Virginia-class submarine, SSN-793, and two FY 15 submarines, SSN-794 and SSN-795. With this modification, the overall contract is worth $595 million.

=== Block V ===
Block V has twelve boats and may incorporate the Virginia Payload Module (VPM), which would give guided-missile capability when the SSGNs are retired from service. The Virginia Payload Module will be included on Block V submarines starting with the second boat, SSN-803. The Block V boats with VPM are expected to triple the capacity of shore targets for each boat. Construction on the first two boats of this block was expected to begin in 2019 but was pushed back to 2020, with contracts for long lead time material for SSN-802 and SSN-803 being awarded to General Dynamics Electric Boat. HII Newport News Shipbuilding was awarded a long-lead materials contract for two Block V boats in 2017, the first Block Vs for the company.

On 2 December 2019, the Navy announced an order for nine new Virginia-class submarines—eight Block Vs and one Block IV—for a total contract price of $22 billion with an option for a tenth boat. The Block V subs were confirmed to have an increased length, from 377 ft (115 m) to 460 ft (140 m), and displacement, from 7,800 tons to 10,200 tons. This would make the Block V the second-longest US submarine, behind only the Ohio-class submarines (at 560 ft; 170 m).

On 22 March 2021, the U.S. Navy added the tenth boat of the Block V series of the Virginia-class attack submarine, issuing a $2.4 billion adjustment on the December 2019 contract. This brings the total cost of the contract with prime contractor General Dynamics Electric Boat to $24.1 billion. The net increase for the contract is $1.89 billion, according to a General Dynamics release. Huntington Ingalls Industries' Newport News Shipbuilding is the partner yard in the program.

=== Block VI ===
For the Fiscal Year 2025, the Navy announced procurement of three Block VI boats, with plans to eventually acquire nine to ten boats in total. The Navy awarded General Dynamics Electric Boat a $1.3 billion long lead materials contract for the first Block VI Virginia-class boats, with a future multi-year contract between the submarine yard and the Navy expected.

The Block VIs will be the second set of Virginia-class attack submarines to feature the Virginia Payload Module, which will meet the Navy's requirement for a large-scale land strike missile platform after the four Ohio-class guided-missile submarines are decommissioned by 2030. Block VI boats will feature six 84-foot wide Multiple All-up-round Canister (MAC) VPMs, four in the middle of the submarine and two on the bow, with each VPM holding seven TLAMs, this will give the Block VI a total capacity of over forty Tomahawk Cruise Missiles. The Navy is also planning to equip its attack submarines, including some of the Block VI's VPMs, with the new Conventional Prompt Strike hypersonic missile system starting in 2028. The Navy has said it would need twenty VPM boats to make up for the strike missile loss when the Ohios retire. Design improvements on the Block VI include improvements in stealth, propulsion, weapons and specialized technology for interacting with the water column from the surface to the seabed, allowing the Block VI to perform land strike missions, anti-submarine and surface ship warfare, special operations support, and intelligence, surveillance, and reconnaissance (ISR) missions.

Block VI boats will also be equipped with a special type of drone that can be deployed from the submarine, connected by a strong fiber optic cable, and interface with military communications networks, allowing the submarine to share data gathered by their sonar and other acoustic systems with air, surface, and land communications nodes. At least one Block VI boat is expected to be a specialized seabed warfare variant, specially designed for undersea espionage and other special missions such as deploying special operations teams, and would eventually replace the Seawolf-class submarine USS Jimmy Carter. In January, 2025 it was announced the first three Block VI boats would be named USS Potomac, USS Norfolk and USS Brooklyn; the contract to build Potomac is expected to be issued in FY2026 with delivery and commissioning in 2034 or 2035.

In July 2026, the Navy awarded a $76.6 billion-dollar contract which included nine Block VI boats. Six are to be delivered by Huntington Ingalls - Newport News Shipbuilding, and the remaining three by General Dynamics Electric Boat, along with five Build II Columbia class ballistic missile submarines.

== Boats in class ==
Name	Hull number	Block	Builder	Laid down	Launched	Commissioned	Status
Virginia	SSN-774	I	General Dynamics Electric Boat, Groton, CT	2 September 1999	16 August 2003	23 October 2004	In service
Texas	SSN-775	I	Newport News Shipbuilding, Newport News, VA	12 July 2002	9 April 2005	9 September 2006	In service
Hawaii	SSN-776	I	General Dynamics Electric Boat, Groton, CT	27 August 2004	17 June 2006	5 May 2007	In service
North Carolina	SSN-777	I	Newport News Shipbuilding, Newport News, VA	22 May 2004	5 May 2007	3 May 2008	In service
New Hampshire	SSN-778	II	General Dynamics Electric Boat, Groton, CT	30 April 2007	21 February 2008	25 October 2008	In service
New Mexico	SSN-779	II	Newport News Shipbuilding, Newport News, VA	12 April 2008	18 January 2009	27 March 2010	In service
Missouri	SSN-780	II	General Dynamics Electric Boat, Groton, CT	27 September 2008	20 November 2009	31 July 2010	In service
California	SSN-781	II	Huntington Ingalls Industries, Newport News, VA	1 May 2009	14 November 2010	29 October 2011	In service
Mississippi	SSN-782	II	General Dynamics Electric Boat, Groton, CT	9 June 2010	10 December 2011	2 June 2012	In service
Minnesota	SSN-783	II	Huntington Ingalls Industries, Newport News, VA	20 May 2011	10 November 2012	7 September 2013	In service
North Dakota	SSN-784	III	General Dynamics Electric Boat, Groton, CT	11 May 2012	15 September 2013	25 October 2014	In service
John Warner	SSN-785	III	Huntington Ingalls Industries, Newport News, VA	16 March 2013	10 September 2014	1 August 2015	In service
Illinois	SSN-786	III	General Dynamics Electric Boat, Groton, CT	2 June 2014	8 August 2015	29 October 2016	In service
Washington	SSN-787	III	Huntington Ingalls Industries, Newport News, VA	22 November 2014	25 March 2016	7 October 2017	In service
Colorado	SSN-788	III	General Dynamics Electric Boat, Groton, CT	7 March 2015	29 December 2016	17 March 2018	In service
Indiana	SSN-789	III	Huntington Ingalls Industries, Newport News, VA	16 May 2015	9 June 2017	29 September 2018	In service
South Dakota	SSN-790	III	General Dynamics Electric Boat, Groton, CT	4 April 2016	14 October 2017	2 February 2019	In service
Delaware	SSN-791	III	Huntington Ingalls Industries, Newport News, VA	30 April 2016	17 December 2018	4 April 2020	In service
Vermont	SSN-792	IV	General Dynamics Electric Boat, Groton, CT	c. February 2017	29 March 2019	18 April 2020	In service
Oregon	SSN-793	IV	General Dynamics Electric Boat, Groton, CT	8 July 2017	25 June 2020	28 May 2022	In service
Montana	SSN-794	IV	Huntington Ingalls Industries, Newport News, VA	16 May 2018	8 February 2021	25 June 2022	In service
Hyman G. Rickover	SSN-795	IV	General Dynamics Electric Boat, Groton, CT	11 May 2018	26 August 2021	14 October 2023	In service
New Jersey	SSN-796	IV	Huntington Ingalls Industries, Newport News, VA	25 March 2019	14 April 2022	14 September 2024	In service
Iowa	SSN-797	IV	General Dynamics Electric Boat, Groton, CT	20 August 2019	18 June 2023	5 April 2025	In service
Massachusetts	SSN-798	IV	Huntington Ingalls Industries, Newport News, VA	11 December 2020	23 February 2024	28 March 2026	In service
Idaho	SSN-799	IV	General Dynamics Electric Boat, Groton, CT	24 August 2020	6 August 2024	25 April 2026	In service
Arkansas	SSN-800	IV	Huntington Ingalls Industries, Newport News, VA	19 November 2022	2 July 2025	Estimated in 2027/2028	Launched
Utah	SSN-801	IV	General Dynamics Electric Boat, Groton, CT	1 September 2021	17 May 2026	Estimated in 2027/2028	Launched
Oklahoma	SSN-802	V	Huntington Ingalls Industries, Newport News, VA	2 August 2023		Estimated in 2028	Under construction
Arizona	SSGN-803	V	General Dynamics Electric Boat, Groton, CT	7 December 2022		Estimated in 2028/2029	Under construction
Barb	SSGN-804	V	Huntington Ingalls Industries, Newport News, VA	9 December 2025			Under construction
Tang	SSGN-805	V	General Dynamics Electric Boat, Groton, CT	17 August 2023			Under construction
Wahoo	SSGN-806	V	Huntington Ingalls Industries, Newport News, VA				Under construction
Silversides	SSGN-807	V	Huntington Ingalls Industries, Newport News, VA				Under construction
John H. Dalton	SSGN-808	V	General Dynamics Electric Boat, Groton, CT				Authorized
Long Island	SSGN-809	V	Huntington Ingalls Industries, Newport News, VA				Authorized
San Francisco	SSGN-810	V	General Dynamics Electric Boat, Groton, CT				Authorized
Miami	SSGN-811	V	Huntington Ingalls Industries, Newport News, VA				Authorized
Baltimore	SSGN-812	V	General Dynamics Electric Boat, Groton, CT				Announced
Atlanta	SSGN-813	V	General Dynamics Electric Boat, Groton, CT				Announced
Potomac	SSGN-814	VI					Announced
Norfolk	SSGN-815	VI					Announced
Brooklyn	SSGN-816	VI					Announced
Name	Hull number	Block	Builder	Laid down	Launched	Commissioned	Status

=== Future acquisitions ===
The Navy initially planned to acquire at least 30 Virginia-class submarines; however, more recent data provided by the Naval Submarine League (in 2011) and the Congressional Budget Office (in 2012) seems to imply that more than 30 submarines may eventually be built. The Naval Submarine League believes that up to 10 Block V boats will be built. The same source also states that 10 additional submarines could be built after Block V submarines, with 5 in the so-called Block VI and 5 in Block VII, largely due to the delays experienced with the "Improved Virginia". These 20 submarines (10 Block V, 5 Block VI, 5 Block VII) would carry VPM, bringing the total number of Virginia-class submarines to 48 (including the 28 submarines in Blocks I, II, III and IV). The CBO in its 2012 report states that 33 Virginia-class submarines will be procured in the 2013–2032 timeframe, resulting in 49 submarines in total since 16 were already procured by the end of 2012. Such a long production run seems unlikely, but another naval program, the Arleigh Burke-class destroyer, is still ongoing even though the first vessel was ordered in 1985. However, other sources believe that production will end with Block V. In addition, data provided in CBO reports tends to vary considerably compared to earlier editions.

One Block VI submarine will include an organic ability to employ seabed warfare equipment.

General Dynamics Electric Boat, a business unit of General Dynamics, announced on 5 August 2024 that it has been awarded a $1.3 billion undefinitized contract modification allowing Electric Boat to purchase long lead time materials for Virginia-class Block VI submarines.

During the Naval Submarine League's annual symposium on 13 November 2024, plans for extending the Virginia-class to Block VIII - due to SSN(X) delays - were voiced.

== SSN(X)/Improved Virginia ==
Initially dubbed Future Attack Submarine and Improved Virginia class in early Congressional Budget Office (CBO) reports, the SSN(X) will instead be a largely new design that initially supplements and eventually replaces the Virginia class submarines.

In late 2014, the US Navy began early preparation work on the SSN(X). It was planned that the first submarine would be procured in 2025. However, their introduction (i.e., procurement of the first submarine) has been pushed back to 2033/2034. The long-range shipbuilding plan is for the new SSN to be authorized in 2034, and become operational by 2044 after the last Block VII Virginia is built. Roughly a decade would be spent identifying, designing, and demonstrating new technologies before an analysis of alternatives is issued in 2024. An initial small team has been formed to consult with industry and identify the threat environment and technologies the submarine will need to operate against in the 2050-plus timeframe.

In 2019, the Congressional Budget Office estimated that the SSN(X) boats could cost up to $5.5 billion per hull. The current Virginia-class boats cost about $2.8 billion per hull, while the Block V boats with the 80-foot Virginia Payload Module will cost about $3.2 billion. "The Navy indicates that the next-generation attack submarine should be faster, stealthier, and able to carry more torpedoes than the Virginia-class, similar to the Seawolf-class submarine. CBO therefore assumed that the SSN(X) would be a Seawolf-sized SSN, which displaces about 9,100 tons when submerged, and would have an all-new design in keeping with the Navy's description of it as a fast, lethal next-generation attack submarine", the CBO wrote.

== Exports ==
=== Australia ===
On 16 September 2021, Australian Prime Minister Scott Morrison announced that Australia had canceled its contract with French shipbuilder Naval Group for 12 Attack-class diesel-electric submarines based on the French Barracuda-class nuclear submarine that were to replace Australia's diesel-electric Collins-class submarines. The AUKUS trilateral security partnership between Australia, the United Kingdom, and the United States, was announced the same day. Under the pact, the US will share nuclear propulsion technology with Australia the same as it has with the UK since 1958, as will the UK. The Royal Australian Navy (RAN) would acquire at least eight nuclear-powered submarines armed with conventional weapons with basic design and key technologies decided by an 18-month research project. On 22 November 2021, Australia, the UK and the US signed the Exchange of Naval Nuclear Propulsion Information Agreement (ENNPIA) treaty to share classified information about nuclear propulsion.

On 13 March 2023, AUKUS announced that "in the early 2030s, pending Congressional approval, the United States intends to sell Australia three Virginia-class submarines, with the potential to sell up to two more if needed". These submarines would ensure there would be no capability gap between when the Collins-class is retired and the introduction of a new class of nuclear-powered submarines, the SSN-AUKUS. AUKUS also announced on the same day that the UK's SSNR submarine design will be renamed SSN-AUKUS and be trilaterally developed and built in the UK and in Australia. The SSN-AUKUS class "will have a high degree of commonality" with the Virginia-class, including "sharing elements of the propulsion plant, combat system and weapons".

The first in-service U.S. Navy Block IV Virginia-class boat is planned to be sold to the RAN in 2032 and the second in-service Block IV in 2035. The third boat to be sold to the RAN, in 2038, was to be a new Block VII without the Virginia Payload Module. The first boat of the SSN-AUKUS class for the RAN is planned to be delivered in the early 2040s; five boats are planned to be built, with a boat built every three years. If the SSN-AUKUS build schedule falls behind, the RAN has the option of purchasing up to two additional Virginia-class boats.

On 30 May 2026, at an AUKUS Defence Minister's Meeting held in Singapore it was announced that the third boat to be sold to Australia will now be an in-service Block IV the same as the first two. This will simplify fleet training and maintenance for Australia and save them significant costs. Australian Minister for Defence Industry Pat Conroy said it had been Australia's original preference to acquire three in-service boats when negotiating the arrangement.

== See also ==
- Cruise missile submarine
- Future of the Royal Australian Navy
- List of current United States Navy ships
- List of submarine classes in service
- List of submarine classes of the United States Navy
- List of submarines of the United States Navy
- Submarines in the United States Navy
