= SSN(X)-class submarine =

Planned U.S Navy attack submarines

Class overview
- Name: SSN(X)
- Builders: General Dynamics Electric Boat (expected); Huntington Ingalls Industries Newport News Shipbuilding (expected)
- Operators: United States Navy
- Preceded by: Virginia class
- Cost: $6.7 billion to $8.0 billion per unit
- Built: 2040 (planned)

General characteristics (conceptual)
- Type: Nuclear-powered attack submarine with VLS-launched cruise missile capability
- Propulsion: Nuclear reactor
- Range: Unlimited
- Endurance: Only limited by food and maintenance requirements.
- Sensors & processing systems: Active and passive sonar; mast-mounted radar
- Armament: Torpedoes, missiles, and mines

The SSN(X) or Next-Generation Attack Submarine program of the United States Navy aims to develop a new class of nuclear-powered attack submarine with vertical launch systems for cruise missiles to succeed the Virginia and Seawolf classes. The SSN(X) program remains in the early stages of development, and no official details have been released about its design or capabilities.

This program is expected to incorporate advanced technologies and capabilities to ensure that the new submarines will be able to meet the evolving challenges of the modern maritime environment. It is believed that the SSN(X) program will focus on improving stealth, sensor capabilities, and firepower to enable the new submarines to operate effectively in a variety of missions, including intelligence gathering, special operations, and anti-submarine warfare.

Along with the Columbia-class ballistic missile submarine, the SSN(X) program is seen as a critical component of the Navy's future submarine force and is expected to play a key role in maintaining American naval superiority in the coming decades. Despite projected schedules, it is not yet clear when the SSN(X) program will be fully developed and deployed, but it is likely to be a major focus of the Navy's research and development efforts in the coming years.

== History ==
The United States Navy first publicly discussed the SSN(X) program in 2014, describing plans to complete analysis of the new design's needs by 2024 and to begin construction by 2034, with initial deployment in 2043 after the last of the planned Virginia-class submarines are put into service. Over the next several years, the Navy conducted studies and analyses to determine the capabilities and requirements for the new submarines.

The Navy's budget request for Fiscal Year 2022 included $98.0 million to continue research and development, including $29.8 million for general class development and $68.1 million for developing its nuclear propulsion. The related budget lines (0604850N and 0603570N, respectively) were included unchanged in the FY 2022 National Defense Authorization Act signed into law by President Joe Biden in December 2021.

The Navy's FY2023 budget requests included $237.0 million, including $143.9 million for general class development and $93.1 million for its nuclear propulsion. As in 2021, the requested budget lines were included unchanged in the FY 2023 NDAA signed into law by President Biden in December 2022.

For FY2024, the Navy requested substantially more money totaling $544.7 million, a 130% increase over FY2023. Of that total, $361.6 million was requested for general class development (a 151% increase) and a further $183.1 million for nuclear propulsion (a 97% increase). Congress appropriated $321.9 million for general class development and $319.7 million for nuclear propulsion.

The Navy's requests for FY2025 included $384.8 million for general class development and $238.1 million for nuclear propulsion.

== Design ==
Details about the design have not been publicly released and are likely to change because the project is still in development. The Navy described its goals in its FY2022 budget request:

Unlike the Virginia Class Submarine, which was designed for multimission dominance in the littoral, SSN(X) will be designed for greater transit speed under increased stealth conditions in all ocean environments, and carry a larger inventory of weapons and diverse payloads. It will also be designed to retain multi-mission capability and sustained combat presence in denied waters, with a renewed priority in the antisubmarine warfare (ASW) mission against sophisticated threats in greater numbers.

In September 2022, at the American Society of Naval Engineers' Fleet Maintenance and Modernization Symposium, Rear Adm. Jon Rucker stated that operational availability would be a major focus of the SSN(X), noting that, at the time, 18 out of 50 SSN attack submarines (all classes) were unavailable due to maintenance. Problems cited by Rucker and by Rear Adm. Scott Brown included planning maintenance timetables, completing maintenance work, and having necessary spare parts available. Brown cited cannibalization of one boat to get another boat ready, a circumstance that both officers described as undesirable.

The Navy expects to complete its Analysis of Alternatives in FY2024, at which time the basic requirements should be set. The Navy currently expects delivery of the first boat in 2042.

=== Capabilities ===
An initial small team was formed to consult with industry and identify the threat environment and technologies the submarine will need to operate against in the 2050-plus timeframe. One area already identified is the need to integrate with off-board systems so future Virginia boats and the SSN(X) can employ networked, extremely long-ranged weapons. A torpedo propulsion system concept from the Pennsylvania State University could allow a torpedo to be launched at a target 200 nmi (230 mi; 370 km) away and be guided by another asset during the terminal phase. Targeting information might also come from another platform like a patrol aircraft or an unmanned aerial vehicle (UAV) launched from the submarine. Researchers have identified a quieter advanced propulsion system and the ability to control multiple unmanned underwater vehicles (UUVs) at once as key SSN(X) components. The future submarines will operate through the end of the 21st century, and potentially into the 22nd century. New propulsion technology, moving beyond the use of a rotating mechanical device to push the boat through the water, could come in the form a biomimetic propulsion system that would eliminate noise-generating moving parts like the drive shaft and the spinning blades of the propulsor.

The size of the SSN(X) has not yet been publicly disclosed as of early 2023, but according to a December 2022 revision of the CRS report, the Navy wants "the speed and payload the Navy’s fast and heavily armed Seawolf (SSN-21) class SSN design, the acoustic quietness and sensors of the Virginia-class design, and the operational availability and service life of the Columbia-class design."

An updated CRS report from March 2023 included additional notes about the planned capabilities of the new submarines, taken from the Navy's budget justification documents for FY2024.

SSN(X) will conduct full spectrum undersea warfare and be able to coordinate with a larger contingent of off-hull vehicles, sensors, and friendly forces. It will retain and improve multi-mission (Anti-submarine warfare (ASW), Anti-surface warfare (ASuW), Strike, Special Operating Forces (SOF), Mine, Subsea Seabed Warfare (SSW), Intelligence, Surveillance and Reconnaissance (ISR)) capability and sustained combat presence in denied waters.

The March 2023 report also describes a Congressional Budget Office (CBO) report that estimates the submerged displacement of the SSN(X) as 11% larger than the SSN-21 (Seawolf-class) design. This suggests a submerged displacement around 10,100 tons, based on the Seawolf-class's base displacement of 9,138 tons. This estimate was present in a March 2025 revision of the report.

A March 2025 revision of the CBO report describes the general capabilities of the planned submarine:

The Navy states that the SSN(X) “will be designed to counter the growing threat posed by near peer adversary competition for undersea supremacy. It will provide greater speed, increased horizontal [i.e., torpedo-room] payload capacity, improved acoustic superiority and non-acoustic signatures, and higher operational availability. SSN(X) will conduct full spectrum undersea warfare and be able to coordinate with a larger contingent of off-hull vehicles, sensors, and friendly forces.”

== Construction ==
The United States has two yards capable of building nuclear-powered submarines: General Dynamics’ Electric Boat Division (GD/EB) of Groton, CT, and Quonset Point, RI; and Huntington Ingalls Industries’ Newport News Shipbuilding (HII/NNS), of Newport News, VA. The actual construction approach is currently undecided and may take one of two forms:

- Joint construction by the two yards, as done with the Virginia-class SSN and, with some modifications, the Columbia-class SSBN. With this approach, each shipyard takes turns building key components and performing final construction, such that each boat is built in pieces at different yards and assembled at a single yard, that yard shifting back and forth. This allows for a low rate of production while ensuring that critical skills are maintained at both yards, which theoretically should help keep costs down.
- Separate-yard approach where a given shipyard is responsible for all construction of a given boat, the traditional approach used with earlier designs such as the Los Angeles-class and Ohio-class submarines. This is more suitable for faster production rates.

== Procurement ==
The Navy has not yet disclosed the target number of vessels it intends to purchase, but in July 2022 it suggested a target of 66 nuclear-powered fast-attack submarines by 2045 made up of the Virginia-class and SSN(X) designs. A CBO report in November 2022 suggested that the Navy is looking at several alternatives for the number of boats purchased over the next 30 years. All would be a decrease from the 77 total boats planned for procurement between 2022 and 2051 in the December 2020 Plan. All three alternatives saw construction of SSN(X) submarines beginning in 2034.

US Navy Attack Submarine Purchase Alternative Plans
Submarine class	Alternative 1	Alternative 2	Alternative 3
Virginia-class submarines with the Virginia payload module	23	33	27
Virginia-class submarines	0	16	0
SSN(X) next-generation attack submarines	31	17	33
Total	54	66	60

The CBO has disputed the Navy's cost estimates in multiple reports. In April 2021, the Navy and CBO disagreed somewhat on the costs of the new design but both expected much higher costs than the $2.8 billion for Virginia-class boats, with the Navy estimating $5.8 billion and the CBO estimating $6.2 billion. According to the November 2022 report, the Navy expected costs of $5.6 billion per SSN(X) boat over the 30-year period under all three alternatives, while the CBO expected $6.3 billion, $7.2 billion, and $6.2 billion, respectively. In early 2025, the cost estimates had grown to $6.7 billion to $7.0 billion per boat by the Navy and $7.7 billion to $8.0 billion by the CBO.

In May 2024, the Navy announced that it was pushing back initial acquisition from the early 2030s to 2040 due to competing funding priorities for other projects as well as the need to fund current and near future operations.

== See also ==
- Columbia-class submarine
- Cruiser Baseline
- CG(X)
- FF(X)
- DDG(X)
- SSN-AUKUS
