= USS Baltimore (SSGN-812) =

US Navy Virginia-class submarine

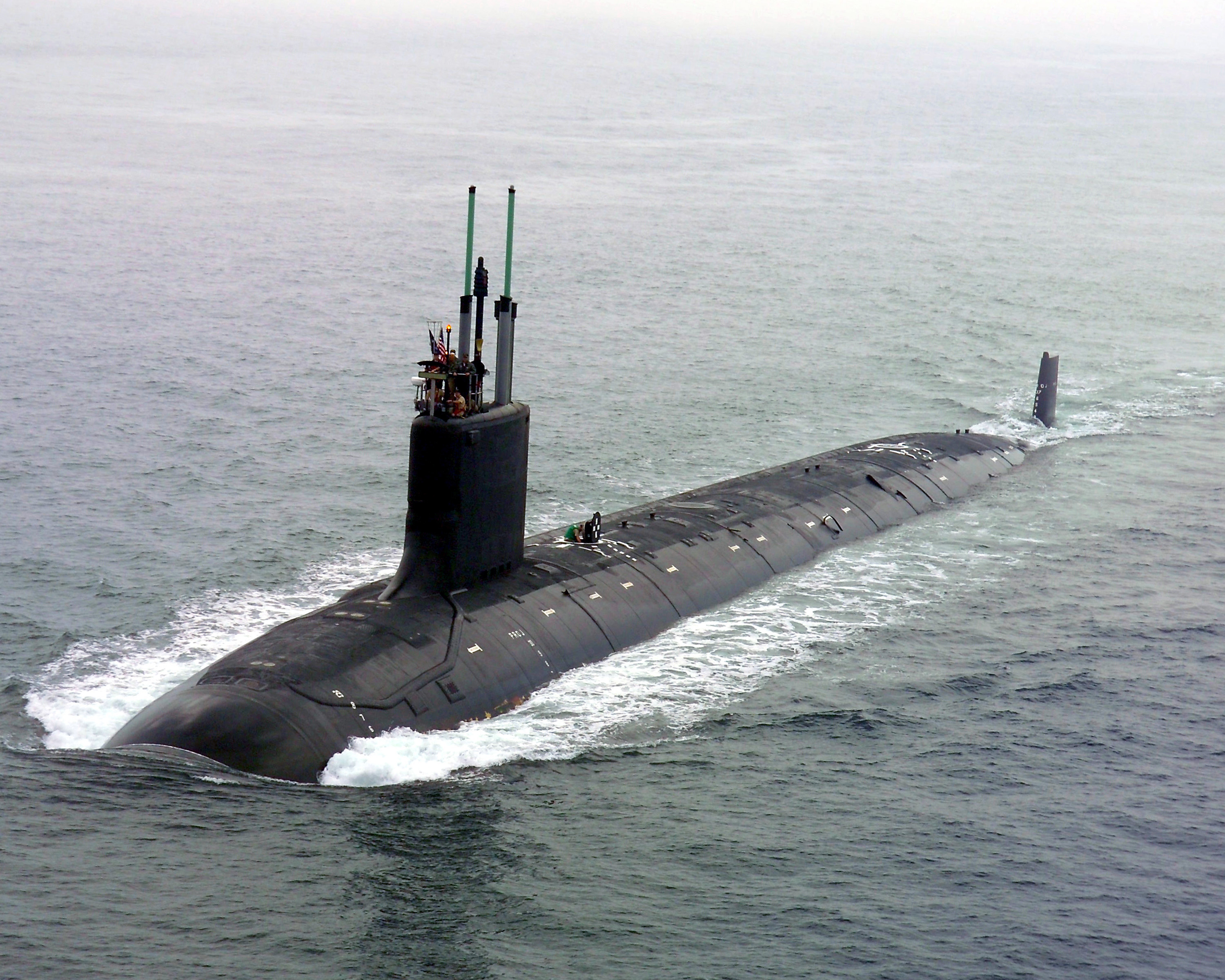
- The lead boat of the Virginia class, USS Virginia (SSN-774)

History

United States
- Name: Baltimore
- Namesake: Baltimore, Maryland
- Ordered: 2024
- Identification: Pennant number:SSGN-812

General characteristics
- Class & type: Virginia-class submarine
- Displacement: 10,200 tons
- Length: 460 ft (140 m)
- Beam: 34 ft (10.4 m)
- Draft: 32 ft (9.8 m)
- Propulsion: S9G reactor auxiliary diesel engine
- Speed: 25 knots (46 km/h)
- Endurance: can remain submerged for more than 3 months
- Test depth: greater than 800 ft (244 m)
- Complement: 15 officers; 120 enlisted crew
- Armament: 40 VLS tubes (12 forward VPT; 28 in VPM), four 21 inch (530 mm) torpedo tubes for Mk-48 torpedoes BGM-109 Tomahawk

USS Baltimore (SSGN-812) will be a nuclear-powered Virginia-class submarine of the United States Navy, the eleventh Block V attack submarine and 39th overall of her class. Unlike other members of the class, she will specialize in seabed warfare and replace the role previously carried out by USS Jimmy Carter.

The submarine will be the eighth U.S. Navy vessel named for Baltimore, Maryland. She was named after the city due to the recent Francis Scott Key Bridge collapse, and her hull number 812 is a historical reference to the War of 1812. The Bombardment of Baltimore by the Royal Navy in this conflict inspired Key to compose the "Star Spangled Banner," the national anthem of the United States.

Baltimore and sister ship SSGN-813 were ordered during the 2024 Fiscal Year budget at a combined cost of $9.4 billion.

== Design ==
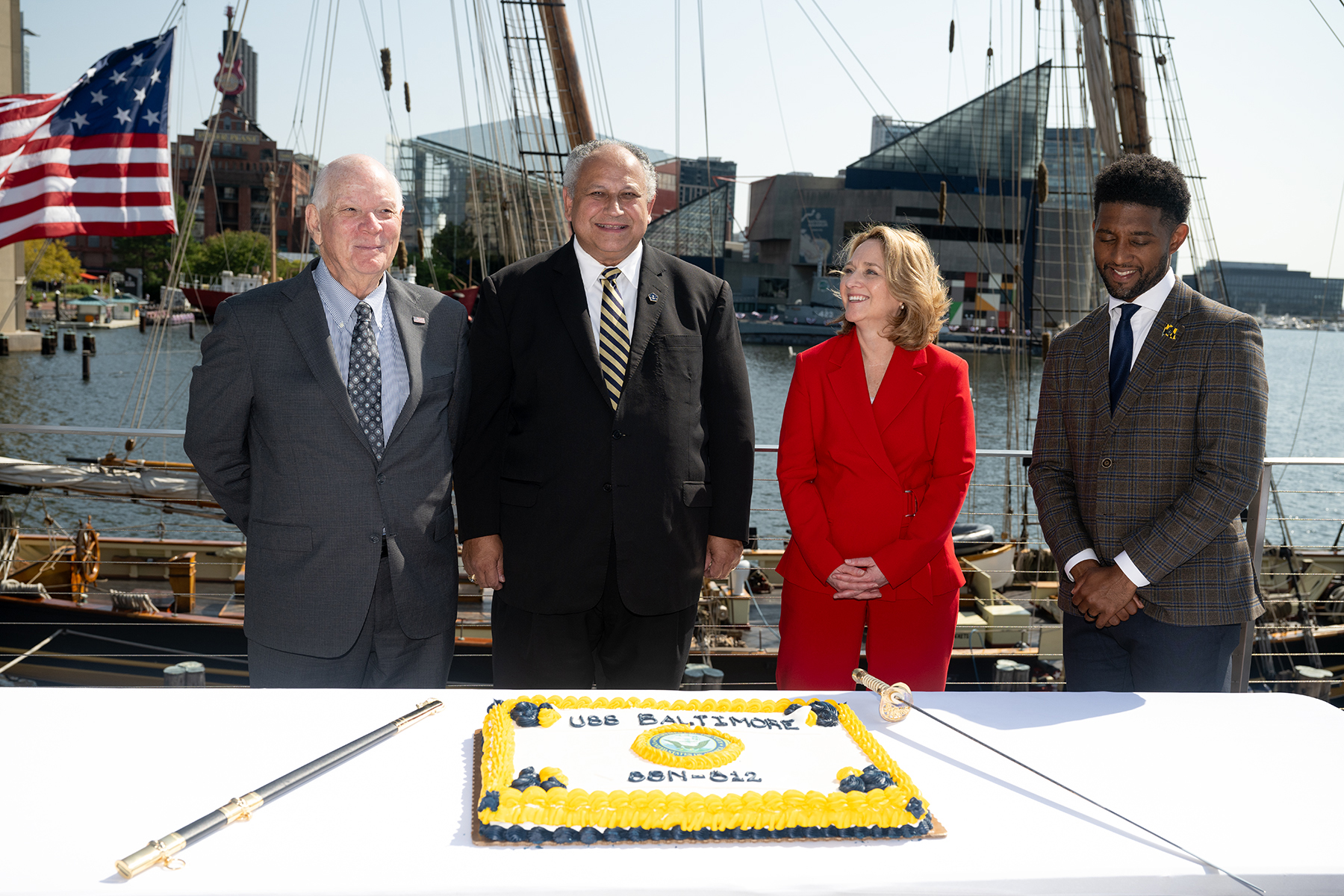
Ceremony for the future submarine USS Baltimore while aboard the USS Constellation in Baltimore, Maryland on September 20, 2024

Compared to Blocks I-IV of Virginia-class submarines, Block V vessels will incorporate previously introduced modifications to the base design in addition to a Virginia Payload Module (VPM). The VPM inserts a segment into the boat's hull which adds four vertical launch tubes. Each tube allows for the carrying of seven Tomahawk strike missiles, increasing her armament to a total of 40 missiles.

In 2026, General Dynamics and the Navy announced plans to convert her into a seabed warfare submarine to replace the older USS Jimmy Carter.
