= USS Brooklyn (SSGN-816) =

US Navy Virginia-class submarine

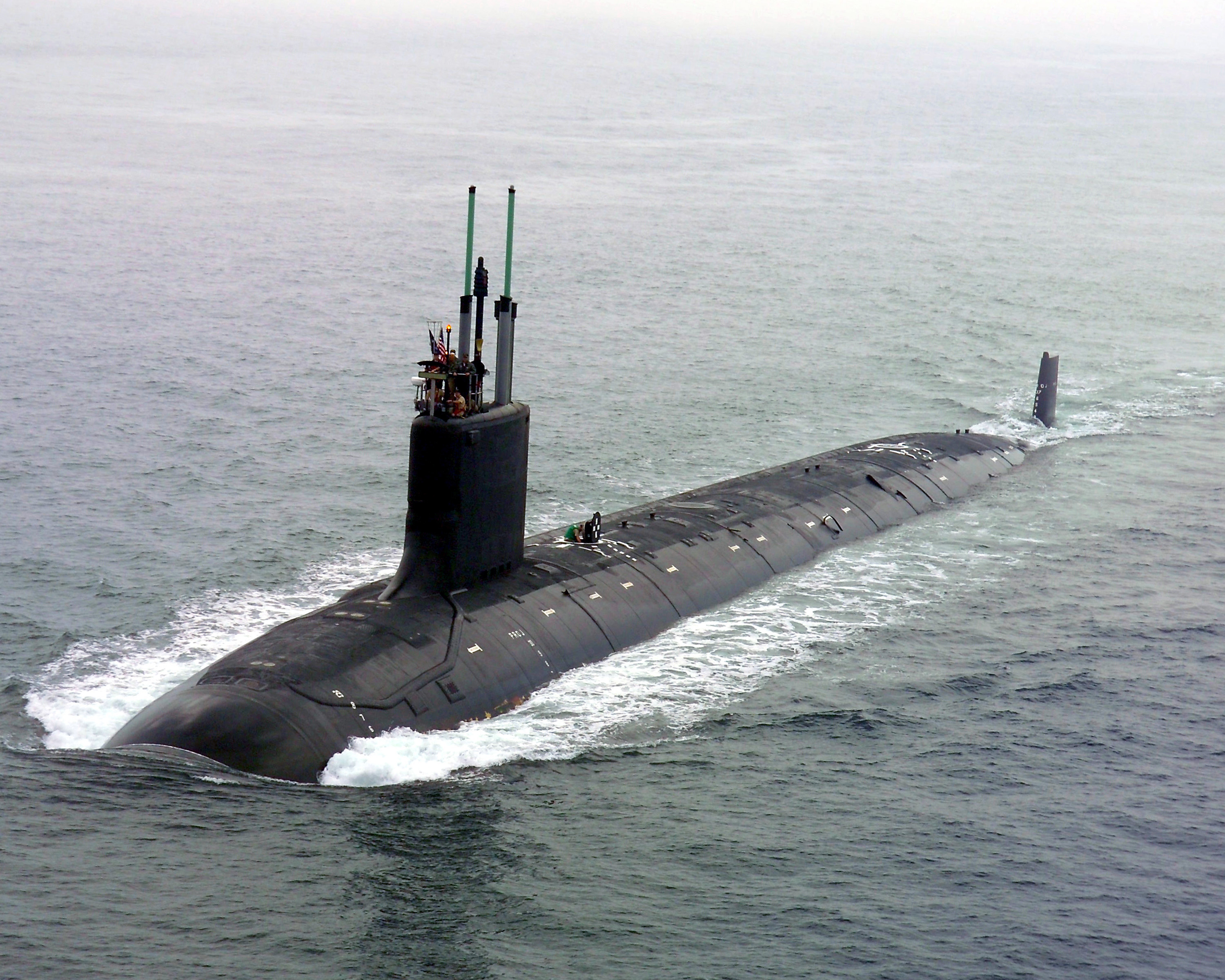
- The lead boat of the Virginia class, USS Virginia (SSN-774)

History

United States
- Name: Brooklyn
- Namesake: Borough of Brooklyn, New York City, New York
- Ordered: TBD
- Identification: Pennant number:SSGN-816

General characteristics
- Class & type: Virginia-class submarine
- Displacement: 10,200 tons
- Length: 460 ft (140 m)
- Beam: 34 ft (10.4 m)
- Draft: 32 ft (9.8 m)
- Propulsion: S9G reactor auxiliary diesel engine
- Speed: 25 knots (46 km/h)
- Endurance: can remain submerged for more than 3 months
- Test depth: greater than 800 ft (244 m)
- Complement: 15 officers; 120 enlisted crew
- Armament: 40 VLS tubes; four 21 inch (530 mm) torpedo tubes for Mk-48 torpedoes or BGM-109 Tomahawk

USS Brooklyn (SSGN-816) will be a nuclear-powered Virginia-class submarine of the United States Navy, the third Block VI attack submarine and 43rd overall of her class.

The submarine would be the fourth U.S. Navy vessel named for Brooklyn, a borough of New York City on Long Island.

Uniquely, Brooklyn was not ordered prior to her naming due to a dispute between the Navy and shipyards Huntington Ingalls Industries and General Dynamics Electric Boat over the potential cost.

== Design ==
Like their Block V predecessors, Block VI submarines will incorporate previously introduced modifications to the base design in addition to a Virginia Payload Module (VPM). The VPM inserts a segment into the boat's hull which adds four vertical launch tubes. Each tube allows for the carrying of seven Tomahawk strike missiles, increasing her armament to a total of 40 missiles.
