= S9G reactor =

Naval nuclear reactor

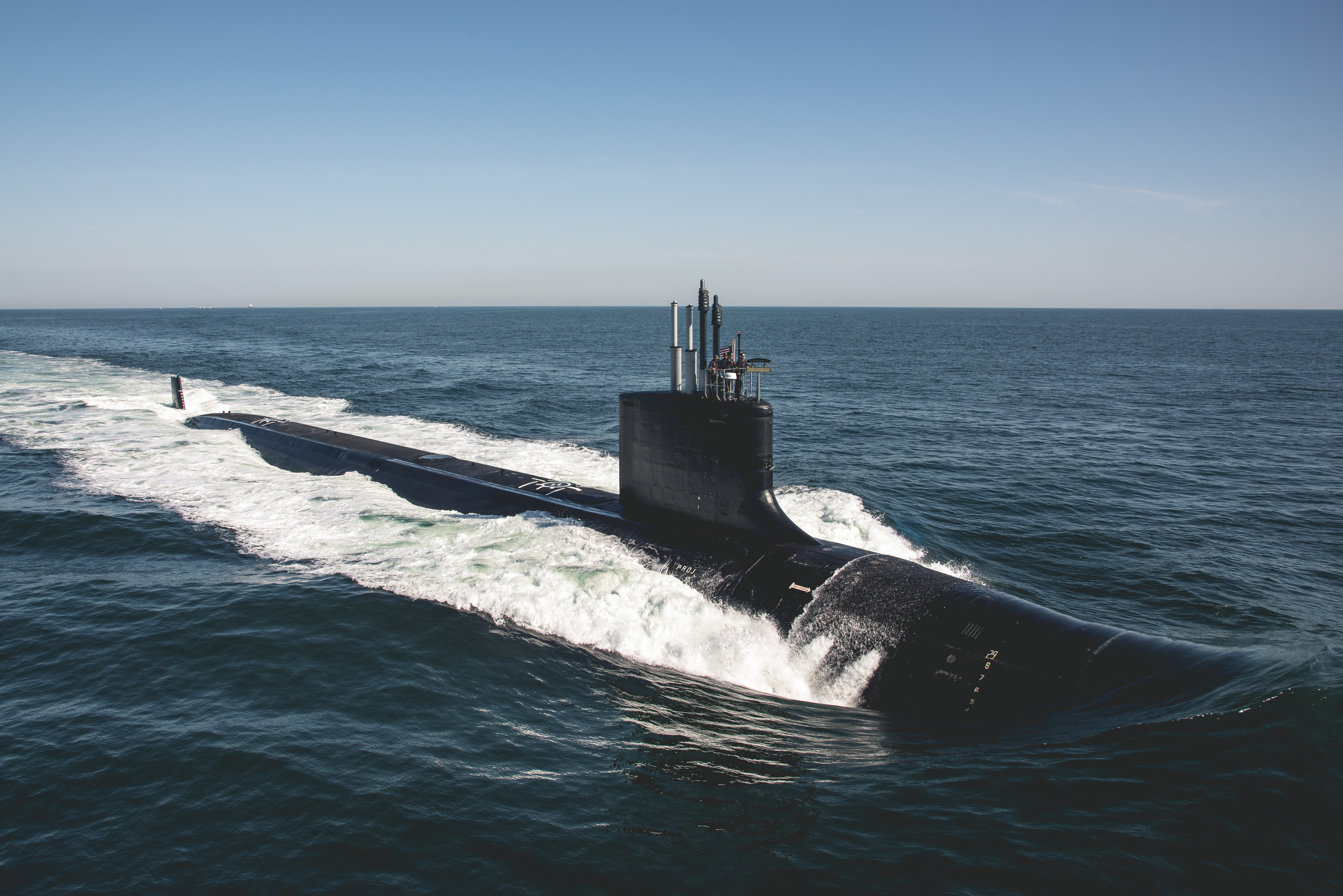
Virginia-class Block III submarine USS Delaware (SSN-791) transiting the Atlantic during her sea trials in 2019

The S9G reactor of the United States Navy is designed to generate electricity and propulsion for the Virginia-class attack submarines. The name S9G follows the designation scheme of platform type (submarines), generation (the ninth), and the contractor (General Electric).

This pressurized water reactor (PWR), developed by Knolls Atomic Power Laboratory (formerly managed by General Electric), features increased energy density, and new plant components, including a new steam generator design featuring improved corrosion resistance and reduced life-cycle costs. The steam generator will alleviate the corrosion concerns encountered in existing designs of steam generators, while reducing component size and weight and providing greater flexibility in overall arrangement. The reactor is designed to operate for 33 years without refueling.

This naval nuclear reactor is estimated to generate 210 megawatts (MWt). A secondary steam plant delivers a combined 40,000 shaft horsepower (29.8 MW) to a single pump-jet propulsion system built by BAE Systems that was designed for the Royal Navy.
