= Commander, Submarine Force Atlantic =

Type Command for U.S. Naval submarine forces operating primarily in the Atlantic

Commander, Naval Submarine Force Atlantic
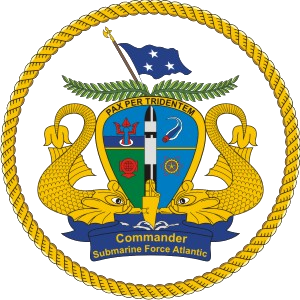
- COMSUBLANT Emblem
- Active: 1941–present
- Country: United States of America
- Branch: United States Navy
- Type: Type commander
- Role: Administrative control over specific assets
- Garrison/HQ: Naval Support Activity Hampton Roads, Virginia

Commanders
- Current commander: Vice Admiral Richard E. Seif Jr.

The Commander, Naval Submarine Forces (a.k.a. COMNAVSUBFOR; and dual-hatted as Commander, Naval Submarine Force, Atlantic or COMSUBLANT or SUBLANT) is the U.S. Submarine Force Atlantic Fleet type commander under the United States Fleet Forces Command.

The principal responsibility of the Admiral commanding is to operate, maintain, train, and equip submarines. COMSUBLANT also has additional duties as commander of NATO's Allied Submarine Command and also Commander, Naval Submarine Forces. As Commander, Naval Submarine Forces (COMSUBFOR), an additional type commander role, he also supervises Commander, Submarine Force Pacific (often known as COMSUBPAC). From the 1960s to the 1990s the commander also held the NATO post of Commander, Submarines, Western Atlantic (COMSUBWESTLANT).

== History ==
Established on 7 December 1941, Rear Admiral Richard S. Edwards was its first commander. COMSUBLANT headquarters was at Naval Submarine Base New London until 1960, when it was moved to Naval Station Norfolk. U.S. submarine operations in the Atlantic, however, date from before World War I. On January 1, 1913, Lieutenant Chester W. Nimitz was in command of the Atlantic Submarine Flotilla, with First Group consisting of submarines C-2, C-3, C-4, and C-5 under Lieutenant Lewis D. Causey, and Second Group consisting of submarines D-1, D-2, D-3, E-1, and E-2 under Lieutenant (junior grade) Claudius R. Hyatt. Nimitz was in command from May 1912 to March 1913.

In October 1945, Submarine Squadron 2 was established at Naval Submarine Base New London, Groton, Connecticut, and in February 1946, Submarine Squadron 8 was commissioned at Groton.

"In correspondence of 31 January 1949, the Chief of Naval Operations directed 'that the Fleet Commanders assign one division in each fleet to [the] sole task [of solving] the problem of using submarines to detect and destroy enemy submarines. All other operations of any nature, even type training, ASW services, or fleet tactics, shall be subordinated to this mission.' After a further exchange of correspondence, Submarine Forces Atlantic established Submarine Development Group 2, consisting of four Diesel submarines, two Guppy (Greater Underwater Propulsion Power Program) conversions and two standard fleet boats." The initial staff included Captain Roy S. Benson, two officers and two yeomen reporting directly to him.

In 1951, Submarine Squadron 10 was established at State Pier, New London, Connecticut. The squadron has the distinction of being the only unit associated with Submarine Base New London to actually be located in New London instead of Groton. In the early 1960s Squadron 10 became the first all-nuclear United States submarine squadron. The squadron was supported by USS Fulton (AS-11) for most of its existence, until both Fulton and the squadron were decommissioned in May, 1991.

In December 1969, Submarine Squadron 8 was decommissioned.

Submarine Squadron 14 operated Fleet Ballistic Missile boats from Holy Loch, Scotland, from 1961 until it was disbanded in 1992. COMSUBLANT also oversaw Submarine Squadron 22 at La Maddalena in the Mediterranean, which existed 1972–2008 and was known as Submarine Refit and Training Group La Maddalena from 1972 to the mid-1980s. Submarine Group 8 continues to operate in support of U.S. and NATO objectives there.

On 1 May 1977, Submarine Development Group 2 was officially redesignated as Submarine Development Squadron 12 in recognition of its role and responsibilities and new organizational status. In August 1979, Submarine Squadron 8 was recommissioned in Norfolk, where it remained until consolidation with Submarine Squadron 6 on April 28, 2011. On January 13, 2012, Submarine Squadron 2 similarly was disestablished, transferring its boats to Submarine Squadron 4 and Submarine Development Squadron 12.

As Commander, Task Force 42, COMSUBLANT operated Atlantic Fleet attack submarines. In addition, as Commander, Task Force 84, the previous Atlantic Fleet special surveillance and anti-submarine warfare commander, COMSUBLANT operates submarines, Maritime Patrol Aircraft, surface ships assigned by Fleet Forces Command and Integrated Undersea Surveillance System assets.

As of 2011, SUBLANT numbers 30 submarines and more than 15,000 officers, enlisted, and civilian personnel providing combat ready submarines in the Atlantic, Arctic, Eastern Pacific, and Indian Oceans and the Mediterranean Sea.

Commander, Naval Submarine Forces wrote in June 2012 on his blog: "We're not perfect. In the Submarine Force we've had some high-visibility lapses in character. You've read about them: the cheating incident on USS MEMPHIS, the fraternization between the Chief of the Boat and a female midshipman on USS NEBRASKA, an incident of hazing on USS Florida, and the financial misconduct of some Supply Officers in Kings Bay. In each case, once discovered, these incidents were thoroughly investigated, and appropriate people were held accountable. This is our approach and we'll continue to address these cases swiftly and decisively."

There have also been previous problems of this nature. Commander Michael J. Alfonso was relieved as Commander, Blue Crew, USS Florida (SSBN-728) in 1997 for ignoring his executive officer and browbeating his crew.

Rear Admiral Kenneth Perry, Commander, Submarine Group 2, retired on Friday, August 22, 2014, and the post of Commander Submarine Group 2 was disestablished that day. The responsibilities of the 45 personnel in the group headquarters have been shifted to the individual submarine squadrons. The new arrangement, with Submarine Squadrons reporting directly to the Submarine type commander for the fleet, mirrors that functioning in the Pacific.

== Units and submarines ==
These are the units and assigned submarines reporting to COMSUBLANT.

=== Naval Station Norfolk ===
Naval Station Norfolk, in Norfolk, Virginia, is home to Submarine Group 2 and the following submarine squadrons:

- Commander, Submarine Squadron 6 (CSS 6):
  - Los Angeles-class submarines:
    - USS Pasadena (SSN-752)
  - Virginia-class submarines:
    - USS New Hampshire (SSN-778)
    - USS Oregon (SSN-793)
    - Pre-Commissioning Unit (PCU) USS Barb (SSN-804)
- Commander, Submarine Squadron 8 (CSS 8):
  - Los Angeles-class submarines:
    - USS Columbus (SSN-762)
    - USS Boise (SSN-764)
    - USS Montpelier (SSN-765)
  - Virginia-class submarines:
    - USS John Warner (SSN-785)
    - USS New Jersey (SSN-796)
    - USS Massachusetts (SSN-798)
    - Pre-Commissioning Unit (PCU) USS Arkansas (SSN-800)
    - Pre-Commissioning Unit (PCU) USS Oklahoma (SSN-802)

=== Naval Submarine Base New London ===
Naval Submarine Base New London in Groton, Connecticut, is home to the Undersea Warfighting Development Center and the following submarine squadrons:

- Commander, Submarine Squadron 4 (CSS 4):
  - Virginia-class submarines:
    - USS Virginia (SSN-774)
    - USS South Dakota (SSN-790)
    - USS Hyman G. Rickover (SSN-795)
    - USS Iowa (SSN-797)
    - USS Idaho (SSN-799)
    - Pre-Commissioning Unit (PCU) USS Tang (SSN-805)
- Commander, Submarine Squadron 12 (CSS 12):
  - Los Angeles-class submarines:
    - USS Newport News (SSN-750)
    - USS Hartford (SSN-768)
  - Virginia-class submarines:
    - USS Texas (SSN-775)
    - USS California (SSN-781)
    - USS Delaware (SSN-791)
    - Pre-Commissioning Unit (PCU) USS Utah (SSN-801)
    - Pre-Commissioning Unit (PCU) USS Arizona (SSN-803)

=== Portsmouth Naval Shipyard ===
Portsmouth Naval Shipyard in Kittery, Maine, is home to the following submarine squadron:

- Commander, Submarine Squadron 2 (CSS 2):
  - Los Angeles-class submarines:
    - USS Columbia (SSN-771)
    - USS Cheyenne (SSN-773)
  - Virginia-class submarines:
    - USS New Mexico (SSN-779)
    - USS Washington (SSN-787)

=== Naval Submarine Base Kings Bay ===
Naval Submarine Base Kings Bay in St. Marys, Georgia, is home to Submarine Group 10 and the following submarine squadrons:

- Commander, Submarine Squadron 16 (CSS 16):
  - Ohio-class submarines:
    - USS Florida (SSGN-728)
    - USS Georgia (SSGN-729)
  - Columbia-class submarines:
    - Pre-Commissioning Unit (PCU) USS District of Columbia (SSBN-826)
- Commander, Submarine Squadron 20 (CSS 20):
  - Ohio-class submarines:
    - USS Alaska (SSBN-732)
    - USS Tennessee (SSBN-734)
    - USS West Virginia (SSBN-736)
    - USS Maryland (SSBN-738)
    - USS Rhode Island (SSBN-740)
    - USS Wyoming (SSBN-742)

=== Naval Support Activity Naples ===
Naval Support Activity Naples in Naples, Italy, is home to Submarine Group 8.

== Officers serving as COMSUBLANT ==
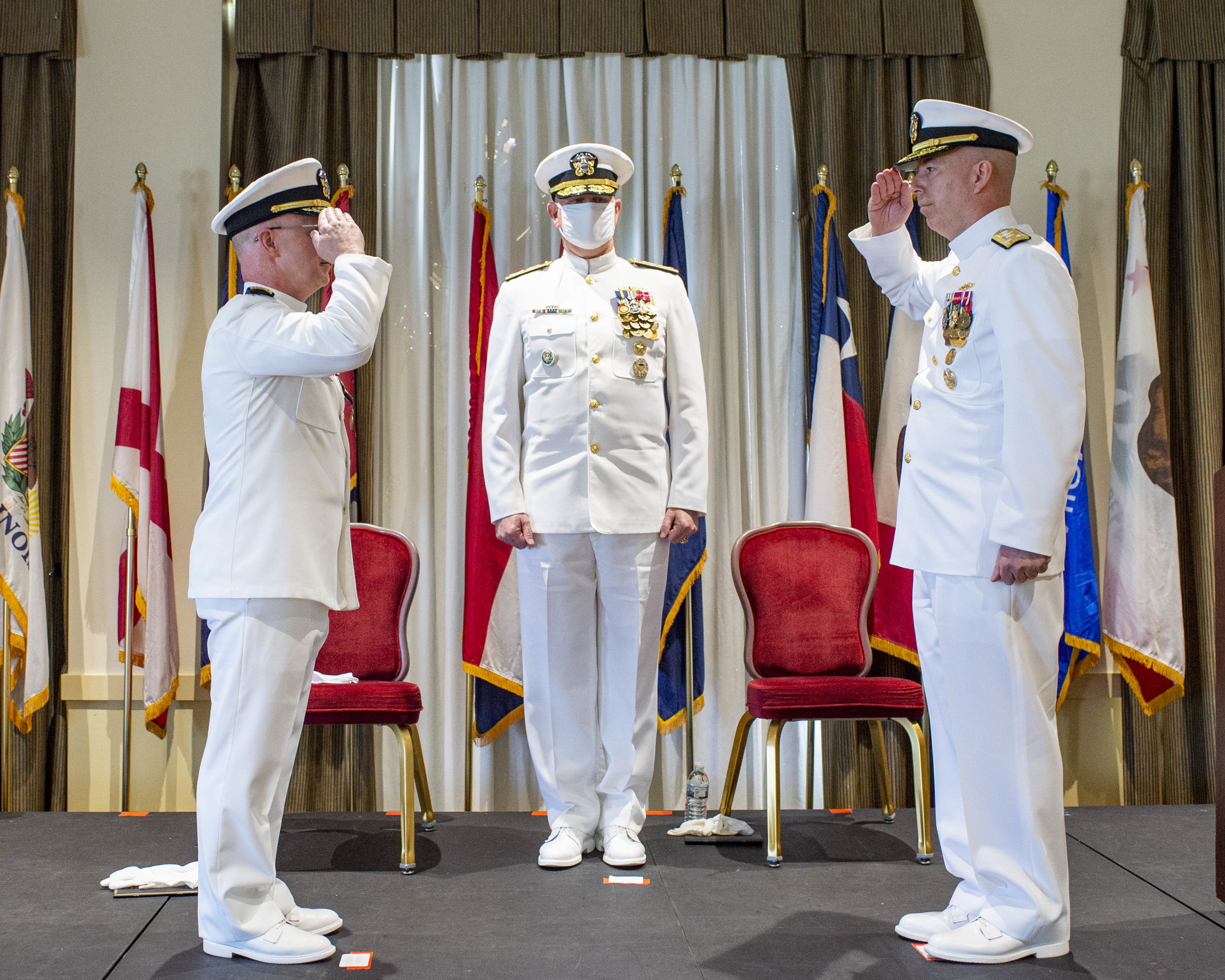
Adm. Christopher W. Grady, commander, U.S. Fleet Forces Command, center, looks on as Vice Adm. William Houston, right, relieves Vice Adm. Daryl Caudle during the Commander, Submarine Forces change of command ceremony in Norfolk, Va., September 10, 2021.

The following is an incomplete list:

- Rear Admiral Richard S. Edwards, 1941–1942
- Rear Admiral Freeland A. Daubin, 1942–1944
- Rear Admiral Charles W. Styer, 1944–1946
- Rear Admiral John Wilkes, 1946–1947
- Rear Admiral James Fife, Jr., 1947–1950
- Rear Admiral Stuart S. "Sunshine" Murray, 1950–1952
- Rear Admiral George C. "Turkey Neck" Crawford, 1952–1954
- Rear Admiral Frank T. Watkins, 1954–1957
- Rear Admiral Charles W. "Weary" Wilkins, March–September 1957^{†}
- Rear Admiral Frederick B. Warder, September 1957 – 1960^{†}
- Rear Admiral Lawrence R. "Dan" Daspit, January–September 1960^{†}
- Vice Admiral Elton W. "Joe" Grenfell, September 1960 – 1964^{†} (also COMSUBPAC, 1964–1966)
- Vice Admiral Vernon L. "Rebel" Lowrance, 1964–1966^{†}
- Vice Admiral Arnold F. Schade, 1966–1970^{†}
- Vice Admiral Eugene P. Wilkinson, 1970–1972 (last WW2 submarine officer to hold the position)
- Vice Admiral Robert L. J. Long, 1972–1974
- Vice Admiral Joe Williams, Jr., 1974–1977
- Vice Admiral Kenneth M. Carr, 1977–1980
- Vice Admiral Steven A. White, 1980–1983
- Vice Admiral Bernard M. Kauderer, 1983–1986
- Vice Admiral Daniel 'Dan' L. Cooper, 1986–1988
- Vice Admiral Roger F. Bacon, 1988–1990
- Vice Admiral Henry "Hank" G. Chiles, 1990–1993
- Vice Admiral George W. Emery, 1993–1996
- Vice Admiral Richard W. Mies, 1996–1998
- Vice Admiral Edmund P. Giambiastiani, 1998–2000
- Vice Admiral John J. Grossenbacher, 2000–2003
- Vice Admiral Kirk H. Donald, 2003–2004
- Vice Admiral Charles L. Munns, 2004–2007
- Vice Admiral John J. Donnelly, 2007–2010
- Vice Admiral John Richardson, 2010–2012
- Vice Admiral Michael J. Connor, 2012–2015
- Vice Admiral Joseph E. Tofalo, 2015–2018
- Vice Admiral Charles A. Richard 2018–2019
- Vice Admiral Daryl Caudle 2019-2021
- Vice Admiral William J. Houston 2021–2023
- Vice Admiral Robert Gaucher 2023–2026
- Vice Admiral Richard E. Seif Jr. 2026–present

^{†} Wartime submarine commander
