= James P. Waters =

U.S. Navy admiral

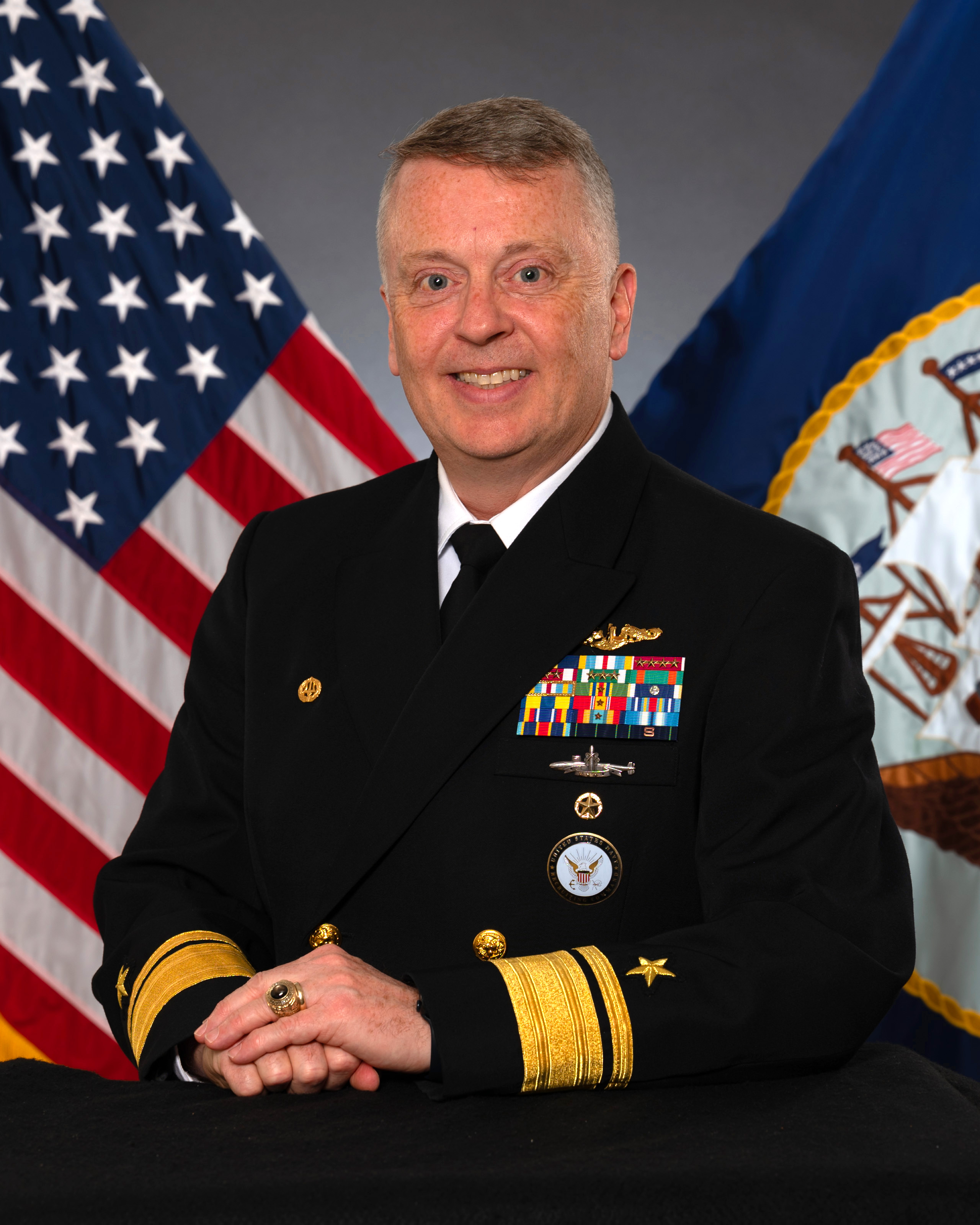
- Official portrait, 2024
- Born: 1967 (age 58–59)
- Military career
- Allegiance: United States
- Branch: United States Navy
- Service years: 1989–present
- Rank: Rear admiral
- Commands: Navy Recruiting Command; Submarine Group 2 Submarine Squadron 4 USS Virginia (SSN-774)

James Preston Waters III (born 1967) is a United States Navy rear admiral who has served as commander of the Navy Recruiting Command since March 27, 2024.

== Early life and education ==
Raised in Ellington, Connecticut, Waters earned a B.S. degree in systems engineering from the United States Naval Academy in 1989. Awarded a W.H.G. FitzGerald Scholarship, he continued his education at Oxford University until 1991.

== Career ==
Waters discussing eSports

Prior to taking over command of U.S. Navy Recruiting, Waters most recently served as the Director of Military Personnel Plans and Policy of the U.S. Navy from 2021 to 2024. Previously, he served as the Commander of Submarine Group 2 from 2019 to 2021.

Military offices
Preceded by Michael P. Holland	Director of Maritime Headquarters of the United States Pacific Fleet; 2017–2019	Succeeded by Robert Gaucher
New office	Commander of Submarine Group 2; 2019–2021	Succeeded by Brian L. Davies
Preceded by Jeffrey Jablon	Director of Military Personnel Plans and Policy of the United States Navy; 2021–2024	Vacant
Preceded by Alexis T. Walker	Commander of the Navy Recruiting Command; 2024–present	Incumbent
