= Worrall Reed Carter =

American naval officer and historian

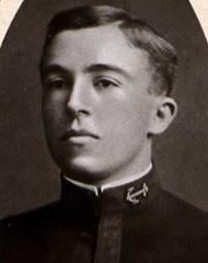
- As a midshipman at Annapolis
- Born: 11 January 1885; At sea
- Died: 21 July 1975 (aged 90) Portsmouth, Virginia, United States
- Allegiance: United States
- Branch: United States Navy
- Service years: 1908–1947, 1949–1954
- Rank: Rear Admiral
- Commands: USS C-5; USS D-3; USS L-11; USS Osborne; USS Nokomis; Submarine Squadron 4; USS Marblehead; Guantanamo Bay Naval Base; Service Squadron Ten
- Conflicts: World War I; Atlantic U-boat campaign of World War I; World War II; Guadalcanal campaign; Aleutian Islands campaign; Gilbert and Marshall Islands campaign; Mariana and Palau Islands campaign; Philippines campaign; Volcano and Ryūkyū Islands campaign
- Awards: Distinguished Service Medal; Legion of Merit
- Spouse: Mary Cary Ambler Willcox
- Children: 3

Worrall Reed Carter (11 January 1885 – 21 July 1975) was an American naval officer during World War I and World War II. A graduate of the United States Naval Academy, the Naval Postgraduate School and Columbia University, his early career was in submarines. In World War I, he served on the staff of the commander of US Naval Forces in Europe, Rear Admiral William S. Sims, as an expert on submarine detection devices. During World War II, as commander of Service Squadron Ten, he was responsible for naval logistics in the Pacific Theater. After the war he wrote Beans, Bullets, and Black Oil (1953) about naval logistics in the Pacific, and co-wrote Ships, Salvage, and Sinews of War (1954), about naval logistics in the Atlantic and Mediterranean.

== Early life and career ==
Worrall Reed Carter was born at sea on the sailing ship Storm King on 11 January 1885. He was educated at Bath, Maine, High School, and at the United States Naval Academy in Annapolis, Maryland, which he entered in June in 1904. He graduated in June 1908, ranked 169th in his class of 201.

After graduation, Carter joined the crew of the battleship USS Minnesota, serving with the Great White Fleet and the Atlantic Fleet. In those days, midshipmen had to serve at sea for two years before being commissioned as an ensign, which he duly was on 6 June 1910. In April 1911, he was assigned to the submarine tender USS Castine for instruction in submarines. He commanded the submarine USS C-5 from November 1911 to September 1912, and then the submarine USS D-3 until September 1913, with the rank of lieutenant (junior grade) from 6 June 1913.

Carter studied mechanical engineering at the Naval Postgraduate School in Annapolis and then at Columbia University in New York City, where he earned a Master of Science degree in June 1915. He help fit out the new submarine USS L-11, which was commissioned on 15 August 1915, and was promoted to lieutenant on 29 August 1916. He was its commander until June 1917, when he left to become an instructor in mechanical engineering on the submarine tender USS Fulton at the Naval Submarine Base New London. In January 1918, with the United States now involved in World War I, Carter was assigned to the staff of the commander of US Naval Forces in Europe, Rear Admiral William S. Sims, as an expert on submarine detection devices.

== Between the wars ==
After the Armistice of 11 November 1918 that ended the war, Carter returned to the United States. From January to August 1919, he was the engineer officer on the battleship USS Nevada. He was then assigned to the Norfolk Navy Yard. He had held the temporary rank of lieutenant commander during the war, and this became substantive on 1 January 1921. In June 1922, he became the executive officer of the cargo ship USS Procyon. He then served as executive office of the battleship USS Mississippi from September 1923 and to January 1925.

Carter served afloat with the Brazilian Navy as part of the US Naval Mission to Brazil from February 1925 until December 1926. He was promoted to commander on 4 June 1925. Then followed duty ashore in the Office of Naval Intelligence in Washington, D.C., and at the Naval Station Norfolk in Virginia and Naval Air Station Pensacola in Florida.

Following the usual pattern of duty afloat alternating with duty ashore, he commanded the destroyer USS Osborne in the Atlantic from September 1927 until June 1929 and then spent two years as an instructor in the Department of Engineering and Aeronautics at the Naval Academy. He commanded the hydrographic survey vessel USS Nokomis in the Caribbean Sea from July 1931 to May 1933 and then returned to the Naval Norfolk, Virginia as its executive officer from February 1934 until September 1936.

Carter commanded the cruiser USS Marblehead from October 1936 to April 1938, and the Guantanamo Bay Naval Base in Cuba from June 1938 until August 1940, with the rank of captain from 1 February 1937. His next assignment was as commander of Submarine Squadron 4 and the submarine base at Pearl Harbor in the Territory of Hawaii. In January 1941, he became Chief of Staff and Aide to the Commander, Battleships, Battle Force, Rear Admiral Walter S. Anderson.

== World War II ==
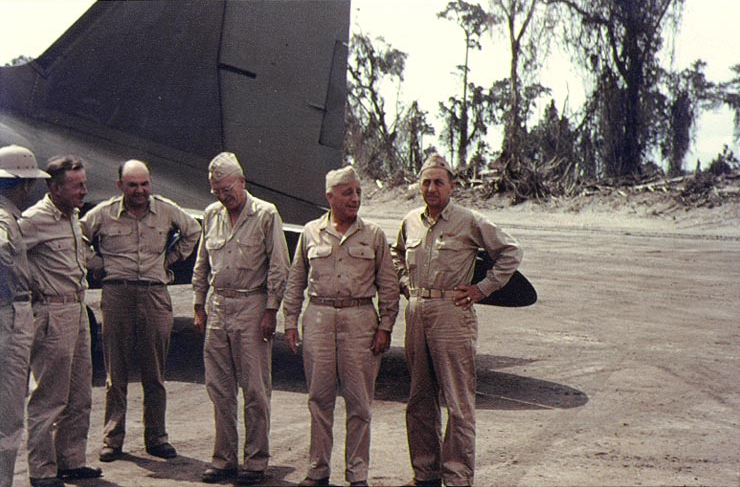
At Piva Airfield, Bougainville, in late 1943 or early 1944. Carter is third from left.

His experience commanding naval bases led to his first active assignment in World War II in October 1942, as commander of the Navy's advanced base in the South Pacific Area. In June 1943, he went to the North Pacific Area, where he oversaw logistical arrangements for the Aleutian Islands campaign. In October, he organised Service Squadron Ten, which provided logistical support for the naval forces in the Gilbert and Marshall Islands campaign.

As the aircraft carriers of Task Force 58 moved forward, so too did Service Squadron Ten, displacing to Eniwetok to support the Mariana and Palau Islands campaign, to Ulithi to support the Philippines campaign, and Leyte for the Volcano and Ryūkyū Islands campaign, flying his flag on the barracks ship USS Ocelot. He was promoted to the wartime rank of commodore on 1 June 1944.

For his services, Carter was awarded the Legion of Merit. His citation read:

For exceptionally meritorious conduct in the performance of outstanding service to the Government of the United States as a Task Group Commander with Flag in USS Prairie, under Commander Third Fleet, during operations against enemy Japanese forces in the Caroline Islands, 26 August 1944 to 26 January 1945. Thoroughly understanding the complex problems of the combatant forces, Commodore Carter planned with foresight and vigorously executed the activities of the Service Forces under his command to support most fully the Third Fleet operations. Effectively overcoming great difficulties and handicaps in replenishing the Fleet during brief and frequently stormy periods, and despite a concentrated attack by Japanese Midget submarine on the Task Group Anchorage at Ulithi, he achieved miracles of battle-damage repairs toward keeping the maximum fighting strength at sea. By his forceful and skilled leadership while operating in forward combat areas, Commodore Carter upheld the highest traditions of the United States Naval Service.

He was also awarded the Navy Distinguished Service Medal. His citation read:

For exceptionally meritorious service to the Government of the United States in a duty of great responsibility as Commander of Service Squadron Ten during operations against enemy Japanese forces in the Central and Western Pacific Areas, from January to August 1944, and from February to May 1945. Responsible for Fleet repairs and logistics at forward mobile bases, Commodore Carter effectively organized his limited facilities to support Fifth Fleet operations during the capture of the Marshall and Marianas Islands, Iwo Jima and strategic positions in Okinawa Gunto and also, provided excellent services for our Fast Carrier Task Forces conducting raids against Truk Atoll, the Palau Group, Tokyo and Kyushu. Foresighted and resourceful, he kept pace with the raid expansion and forward movements of the Fleet, handling all logistic demands in the brief periods permitted by combat operations, effecting all types of operational and battle damage repairs despite the current requirements with overtaxed his facilities, and simultaneously making effective preparations to meet still greater future demands upon Squadron Ten. His inspiring leadership, determination, professional ability and steadfast devotion to the fulfillment of an exacting assignment were important factors in the success of Fifth Fleet operations against the enemy and reflect the highest credit upon Commodore Carter and the United States Naval Service.

On 31 July 1945, Carter was relieved as commander of Service Squadron Ten. His final assignment was in the Bureau of Naval Personnel, with the Board of Medals and Awards. He left active duty on 8 December 1946.

== Later life ==
Carter was promoted to rear admiral on his retirement from the Navy on 21 February 1947 but returned to active duty in May 1949 to write about wartime logistics. He produced two books on the subject, about logistics in the Pacific in Beans, Bullets, and Black Oil (1953) and in the Atlantic in Ships, Salvage, and Sinews of War (1954), which he co-wrote. The title of Beans, Bullets, and Black Oil refers to a 1945 New Year dispatch by Admiral William Halsey Jr. in which he praised the Service Squadron Ten's work and noted that "beans, bullets, black oil, bulk stores, and even bulkheads have been promptly forthcoming on each request". Carter died at Portsmouth Naval Hospital on 21 July 1975. He was survived by a sister, a son and a daughter.

== Dates of rank ==
Ensign	Lieutenant Junior Grade	Lieutenant	Lieutenant Commander
O-1	O-2	O-3	O-4
6 June 1910	6 June 1913	29 August 1916	1 January 1921

Commander	Captain	Commodore	Rear Admiral
O-5	O-6	O-7	O-8
4 June 1925	1 February 1937	1 June 1944	21 February 1947

== Bibliography ==
- Carter, Worrall Reed; Duvall, Elmer Ellsworth (1954). Ships, Salvage, and Sinews of War: The Story of Fleet Logistics Afloat in Atlantic and Mediterranean Waters during World War II. Washington: Department of the Navy. OCLC 191169.
- Carter, Worrall Reed (1953). Beans, Bullets, and Black Oil: The Story of Fleet Logistics Afloat in the Pacific During World War II. Washington, D.C.: Department of the Navy. OCLC 781884.
