= Submarine Squadron 4 =

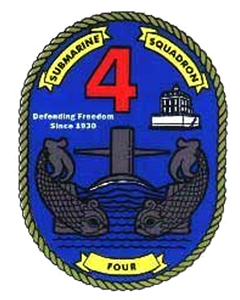
- Active: 1930–1995; 1997–present
- Country: United States of America
- Branch: United States Navy
- Type: Submarine Squadron
- Part of: Submarine Force Atlantic(COMSUBLANT)
- Garrison/HQ: Naval Submarine Base New London
- Equipment: Nuclear Attack Submarines

Commanders
- Current Commodore: Capt. Jason Grizzle

Submarine Squadron 4 ( SUBRON 4, also known as CSS-4) is a US Navy unit of submarines.

Raised by the United States Navy in 1930, since 9 July 1997, the squadron has been based at the Naval Submarine Base New London, Groton, Connecticut, United States of America.

== Current organization ==
- Commander, Submarine Squadron 4 (CSS 4):
  - Virginia-class submarines:
    - USS Virginia (SSN-774)
    - USS South Dakota (SSN-790)
    - USS Hyman G. Rickover (SSN-795)
    - USS Iowa (SSN-797)
    - Pre-Commissioning Unit (PCU) USS Idaho (SSN-799)
    - Pre-Commissioning Unit (PCU) USS Tang (SSN-805)

== History ==
=== Pearl Harbor 1930 to 1945 ===
In 1930, the squadron was raised at the Pearl Harbor submarine base. Its commanding officers to 1945 included the following captains:

- W. K. Wortman (1930 - 1932),
- H. W. Osterhas (1932 - 1934),
- R. A. Kock (1934 - 1936),
- R. S. Culp (1936 - 1938),
- Francis W. Scanland (1938 - November 1940),
- Worrall R. Carter (November 1940 - 7 December 1941),
- Freeland A. Daubin (7 December 1941 - 6 February 1942),
- Robert H. English (19 March 1942 - 10 May 1942),
- John M. Haines (18 May 1942 - 24 June 1942),
- John H. Brown Jr. (14 July 1942 - 4 November 1943),
- Charles D. Edmunds (12 May 1943 - 31 August 1943),
- Leon J. Huffman (11 September 1943 - 27 September 1943),
- Charles B. Momsen (12 November 1943 - 2 July 1944),
- Clarence E. Aldrich (1 December 1943 - 27 December 1943),
- Charles F. Erck (July 1944 - 12 October 1944)
- William V. O'Regan (15 October 1944 - 24 May 1945)

It was Captain Freeland Allan Daubin who was in command during the Japanese attack on Pearl Harbor on 7 December 1941.

While stationed there, the squadron comprised

- Submarine Squadron 4 Headquarters, at Pear Harbour Submarine Base
  - USS Litchfield (DD-336), underway south of Oahu – Tactical Flagship
  - USS Widgeon (ASR-1)
  - Submarine Division 41, at Naval Base San Diego, under Commander Forrest Marmaduke O'Leary
    - USS S-18 (SS-123) (F)
    - USS S-23 (SS-128)
    - USS S-27 (SS-132), being overhauled at Mare Island Naval Shipyard
    - USS S-28 (SS-133), being overhauled at Mare Island Naval Shipyard
    - USS S-34 (SS-139)
    - USS S-35 (SS-140)
  - Submarine Division 42, at Pear Harbour Submarine Base, Commander Clifford Harris Roper
    - USS Argonaut (SM-1) (F), on patrol in the vicinity of Midway Atoll
    - USS Narwhal (SS-167) (F)
    - USS Nautilus (SS-168), at Mare Island Naval Shipyard
    - USS Dolphin (SS-169)
    - USS Cachalot (SS-170)
    - USS Cuttlefish (SS-171), being overhauled at Mare Island Naval Shipyard
  - Submarine Division 43, at Pear Harbour Submarine Base, commanded by Commander Norman Seaton Ives
    - USS Plunger (SS-179) (F), underway en-route from Mare Island Naval Shipyard
    - USS Pollack (SS-180), underway en-route from Mare Island Naval Shipyard
    - USS Pompano (SS-181), underway en-route from Mare Island Naval Shipyard

On 13 January 1943, the command of Submarine Base Pearl Harbor and Submarine Squadron 4 were separated, due to the demands on each command by war time operations. As a result, Captain C. D. Edmunds relieved Captain J. H. Brown, Jr., as commanding officer of the submarine base. Captain Brown retained the command of the squadron. The commanding officer of the submarine base continued under the squadron commander until October 1945. At that time, the submarine force was reorganised and the base commander came directly under command of the Submarine Force, U.S. Pacific Fleet.

=== Key West 1945 to 1959 ===
In about August 1945, the squadron began operations from Key West, Florida, as part of the U.S. Atlantic Fleet. Commanding officers at Key West were Captains Edward S. Hutchinson (October 1945 to 12 March 1947) and Lawrence Randall Daspit (12 March 1947 to 1949). In December 1947, during Daspit's command, President Harry Truman visited the base.

While at Key West, the squadron included USS Howard W. Gilmore (AS-16), and USS Petrel (ASR-14). Submarines assigned to the squadron included the USS Clamagore (SS-343) which was the squadron flagship from January 1946 to 1 August 1959. The USS Sea Poacher (SS-406) was with the squadron from 1 June 1949 to 20 October 1969. The USS Thornback (SS-418) joined the squadron on 2 October 1953. She remained until she was reassigned to the Charleston Naval Base in 1959. Other submarines were the USS Quillback (SS-424); USS Trumpetfish (SS-425) (1953); USS Medregal (SS-480), which joined after the end of World War II; the USS Requin (SS-481) (joined 6 January 1946); USS Irex (SS-482) (1945 to 1947); USS Odax (SS-484); and USS Amberjack (SS-522). The Amberjack arrived in January 1948, and operated along the East Coast and in the West Indies for 11 years.

On 23 April 1947, the former German USS U-3008 reported for duty at Key West with Submarine Squadron 4 and began working with the Operational Development Force. That duty involved the development of submarine and antisubmarine tactics and lasted until October 1947 when she returned to New London.

=== Charleston 1959 to 1995 ===
In 1959, the squadron was moved to the Charleston Naval Base, South Carolina. Its new home port was Pier Mike. The move was part of a plan to disperse the Atlantic Fleet so it would be less vulnerable to nuclear attack. The squadron soon came to be known as the Swamp Fox squadron. This was in reference to Francis Marion, an American Revolutionary War general nicknamed the Swamp Fox. The squadron commanders at Charleston included:

- Richard C. Latham (August 1959 - 27 October 1960)
- Morton H. Lytle (27 October 1960 - TBD)
- Phillip A. Beshany (TBD - 10 August 1962)
- Murray F. Frazee, Jr. (10 August 1962 - July 1963)
- Raymond W. Alexander (July 1963 - TBD)
- George F. Morin (TBD - 5 July 1966)
- Henry Hanssen (5 July 1966 - TBD)
- R. G. Black (TBD - 11 October 1966)
- Max C. Duncan (11 October 1966 - TBD)
- William R. Banks (TBD - 11 October 1970)
- John A Walsh (11 October 1970 - 1972)
- Stan Anderson (1972 - 1974)
- Al Baciocco (1974 - 1976)
- Larry Burkhart (1976 - 1978)
- Claude C. Cross (TBD-1980)
- Thomas C. Maloney (TBD - 1980s)
- James E. Collins (July 1982 - 8 August 1984)
- William A. Owens (8 August 1984 - TBD)
- Mario P. Fiori (July 1986 - June 1987)
- John Jordan (June 1987 - August 1989)
- Dennis Napior (July 1991 - July 1993)
- Stanley R. Szemborski (July 1993 - Late 1995).

Squadron tenders while at Charleston included USS Howard W. Gilmore (AS-16), USS Orion (AS-18), USS Frank Cable (AS-40), USS Canopus (AS-34), USS Ortolan (ASR-22), and USS Petrel (ASR-14).

Submarines included USS Woodrow Wilson (SSBN-624), USS Tecumseh (SSBN-628), USS Sturgeon (SSN-637), USS Grayling (SSN-646), USS Ray (SSN-653), USS Sand Lance (SSN-660), USS Sea Devil (SSN-664), USS Seahorse (SSN-669), USS Narwhal (SSN-671), USS Bluefish (SSN-675), USS Billfish (SSN-676), USS Batfish (SSN-681), USS L. Mendel Rivers (SSN-686), USS Sunfish (SSN-649), and the Barbel-class submarine USS Bonefish (SS-582).

The Base Realignment and Closure Commission announced on 26 February 1993 that the Charleston Naval Shipyard would be closed. The squadron was deactivated in late 1995 just prior to the official closure of Charleston Naval Shipyard on 1 April 1996.

=== Reactivation at Groton, Connecticut ===
On 9 July 1997, the squadron was reactivated at Naval Submarine Base Groton in Connecticut.

From July 1997, commanders included:

- Carl V. Mauney (9 July 1997 - 16 April 1999)
- Melvin G. Williams, Jr. (16 April 1999 - 8 September 2000)
- George E. Manaskie (8 September 2000 - 26 July 2002)
- David E. Eyler (26 July 2002 - 29 April 2004)
- Robert H. Perry (29 April 2004 – July 2006)
- Richard P. Breckenridge (July 2006 - 27 June 2008)
- Robert E. Clark II (27 June 2008 - 9 April 2010)
- Mike Bernacchi (9 April 2010 - 13 January 2012)
- Michael Holland (13 January 2012 - 30 August 2013)
- Jim Waters (30 August 2013 - 31 July 2015)
- John McGunnigle (31 July 2015 - June 2021)
- John Stafford (June 2021 – Present)

From 1997, boats assigned to the squadron included USS Trepang (SSN-674), USS Billfish (SSN-676), USS City of Corpus Christi (SSN-705), USS Providence (SSN-719), USS Miami (SSN-755), USS Annapolis (SSN-760), USS Springfield (SSN-761), USS Hartford (SSN-768), USS New Hampshire (SSN-778), USS New Mexico (SSN-779), USS Missouri (SSN-780), and the USS Mississippi (SSN-782).
