= German submarine U-3008 =

German World War II submarine

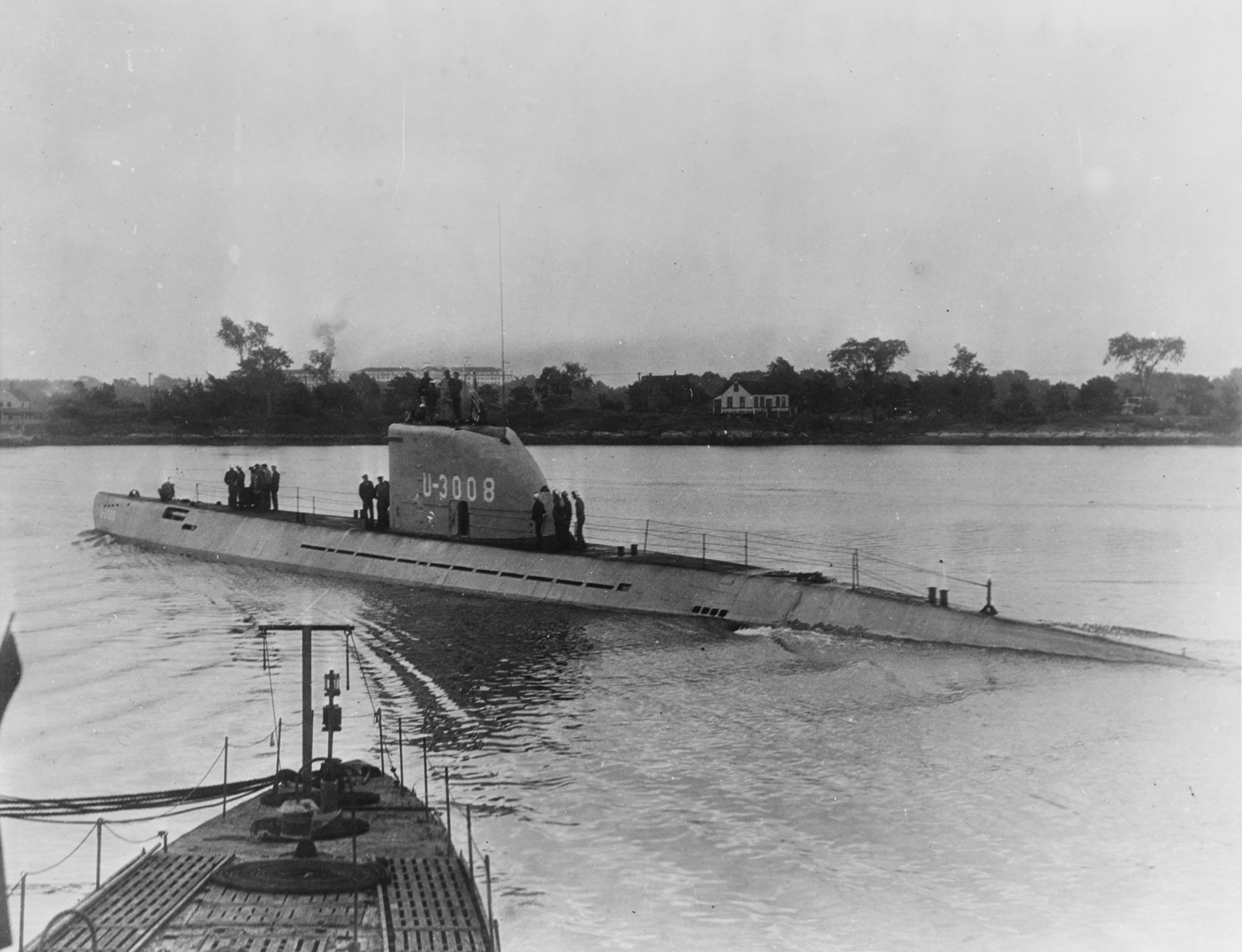
- U-3008 off the Portsmouth Naval Shipyard, Kittery, Maine on 30 August 1946

History

Nazi Germany
- Name: U-3008
- Ordered: 6 November 1943
- Builder: DeSchiMAG AG Weser, Bremen
- Yard number: 1167
- Laid down: 2 July 1944
- Launched: 14 September 1944
- Commissioned: 19 October 1944
- Home port: Wilhelmshaven
- Fate: Surrendered on 11 May 1945

United States
- Name: U-3008
- Acquired: 22 August 1945
- In service: 24 July 1946
- Out of service: 18 June 1948
- Fate: Sunk in May 1954; Raised and hulk sold for scrap on 15 September 1955

General characteristics
- Class & type: Type XXI submarine
- Displacement: 1,621 t (1,595 long tons) surfaced; 1,819 t (1,790 long tons) submerged
- Length: 76.70 m (251 ft 8 in) o/a
- Beam: 8.00 m (26 ft 3 in)
- Height: 11.30 m (37 ft 1 in)
- Draught: 6.32 m (20 ft 9 in)
- Propulsion: Diesel-electric; Diesel engines, 4,400 PS (3,236 kW; 4,340 shp); Electric motors, 4,200 PS (3,089 kW; 4,143 shp)
- Speed: 15.6 knots (28.9 km/h; 18.0 mph)
- Range: 15,000 nmi (28,000 km; 17,000 mi) at 10 knots (19 km/h; 12 mph) surfaced; 340 nmi (630 km; 390 mi) at 5 knots (9.3 km/h; 5.8 mph) submerged
- Test depth: 240–280 m (790–920 ft)
- Complement: 5 officers, 52 enlisted
- Sensors & processing systems: Type F432 D2 Radar Transmitter; FuMB Ant 3 Bali Radar Detector
- Armament: 6 × 53.3 cm (21 in) torpedo tubes; 4 × 2 cm (0.79 in) C/30 guns

Service record (Kriegsmarine)
- Part of: 4th U-boat Flotilla; 19 October 1944 – 1 April 1945; 11th U-boat Flotilla; 1 April – 8 May 1945
- Identification codes: M 46 364
- Commanders: Kptlt. Fokko Schlömer; 19 October 1944 – March 1945; Kptlt. Helmut Manseck; March – 11 May 1945
- Operations: 1 patrol: 3 – 21 May 1945
- Victories: None

German submarine U-3008 was a Type XXI U-boat of Nazi Germany's Kriegsmarine that served in the United States Navy for several years after World War II.

Her keel was laid down on 2 July 1944 by DeSchiMAG AG Weser of Bremen, and she was commissioned on 19 October 1944 with Kapitänleutnant Fokko Schlömer in command. In March 1945 Schlömer was relieved by Kapitänleutnant Helmut Manseck who commanded the boat until Nazi Germany's surrender on 8 May.

== Design ==
Like all Type XXI U-boats, U-3008 had a displacement of 1,621 tonnes (1,595 long tons) when at the surface and 1,819 tonnes (1,790 long tons) while submerged. She had a total length of 76.70 m (251 ft 8 in) (o/a), a beam of 8 m (26 ft 3 in), and a draught of 6.32 m (20 ft 9 in). The submarine was powered by two MAN SE supercharged six-cylinder M6V40/46KBB diesel engines each providing 4,000 metric horsepower (2,900 kilowatts; 3,900 shaft horsepower), two Siemens-Schuckert GU365/30 double-acting electric motors each providing 5,000 PS (3,700 kW; 4,900 shp), and two Siemens-Schuckert silent running GV232/28 electric motors each providing 226 PS (166 kW; 223 shp).

The submarine had a maximum surface speed of 15.6 knots (28.9 km/h; 18.0 mph) and a submerged speed of 17.2 knots (31.9 km/h; 19.8 mph). When running on silent motors the boat could operate at a speed of 6.1 knots (11.3 km/h; 7.0 mph). When submerged, the boat could operate at 5 knots (9.3 km/h; 5.8 mph) for 340 nautical miles (630 km; 390 mi); when surfaced, she could travel 15,500 nautical miles (28,700 km; 17,800 mi) at 10 knots (19 km/h; 12 mph). U-3008 was fitted with six 53.3 cm (21.0 in) torpedo tubes in the bow and four 2 cm (0.79 in) C/30 anti-aircraft guns. She could carry twenty-three torpedoes or seventeen torpedoes and twelve mines. The complement was five officers and fifty-two men.

== Service history ==
=== Kriegsmarine ===
U-3008 left Wilhelmshaven for patrol on 3 May 1945, but returned to port after the surrender. On 21 June 1945, U-3008 was part of a flotilla of six U-boats escorted by HMS Hargood from Wilhelmshaven to Lishally, Northern Ireland. As U-3008 was an advanced design, it was transferred to the United States in some secrecy, reaching New London, Connecticut, on 22 August.

=== United States Navy ===
On 13 September, she moved to the Portsmouth Navy Yard in Kittery, Maine, where she began an extensive overhaul the following day. Work proceeded on an intermittent basis due to the lack of final and total approval of the vessel's allocation to the United States by the Allied powers concerned. However, by the spring of 1946, the naval shipyard received orders to proceed with the overhaul as expeditiously as possible and to place the submarine in service immediately upon its completion. U-3008's overhaul was completed by mid-summer, and she was placed into active U.S. Navy service on 24 July 1946 with Commander Everett H. Steinmetz in charge.

U-3008 was assigned initially to Submarine Squadron 2 and operated along the New England coast out of New London and Portsmouth. That duty continued until 31 March 1947, when she departed New London bound ultimately for Key West, Florida, and duty with the Operational Development Force. En route, the U-boat stopped off at Norfolk, Virginia, for three weeks of underway operations with Task Force 67. She continued south on 19 April and arrived at Key West on 23 April. There, she reported for duty with Submarine Squadron 4 and began working with the Operational Development Force. That duty involved the development of submarine and antisubmarine tactics and lasted until October 1947 when she returned to New London.

The U-boat conducted operations out of New London and Portsmouth between October 1947 and February 1948. On 28 February, she stood out of New London to return to Florida. She reached Key West on 5 March and resumed duty with the Operational Development Force. She remained so engaged until the end of the first week in June. On 7 June, she headed north once more and arrived in Portsmouth on 11 June. On 18 June 1948, U-3008 was placed out of service at the Portsmouth Navy Yard in New Hampshire.

Though out of service, U-3008 remained a Navy test hulk for several years. She was scuttled in a series of demolition tests in 1954. The hulk was raised and towed to the Navy drydock at Roosevelt Roads where she was offered up for sale in 1955. She was sold to Loudes Iron & Metal Company on 15 September 1955, and the purchaser took possession of her on 17 January 1956. She was subsequently scrapped.

== See also ==
- U-2513

== Bibliography ==
- Busch, Rainer; Röll, Hans-Joachim (1999). German U-boat commanders of World War II : a biographical dictionary. Translated by Brooks, Geoffrey. London, Annapolis, Md: Greenhill Books, Naval Institute Press. ISBN 1-55750-186-6.
- Gröner, Erich; Jung, Dieter; Maass, Martin (1991). U-boats and mine warfare vessels. German Warships 1815–1945. Vol. 2. Translated by Thomas, Keith; Magowan, Rachel. London: Conway Maritime Press. ISBN 0-85177-593-4.
