= Castine =

Castine may refer to:

- Castine, Maine, U.S.
  - Castine (CDP), Maine, the main village in the town
- Castine, Ohio, U.S.
- USS Castine, two ships in the United States Navy
