= William J. Houston =

U.S. Navy admiral

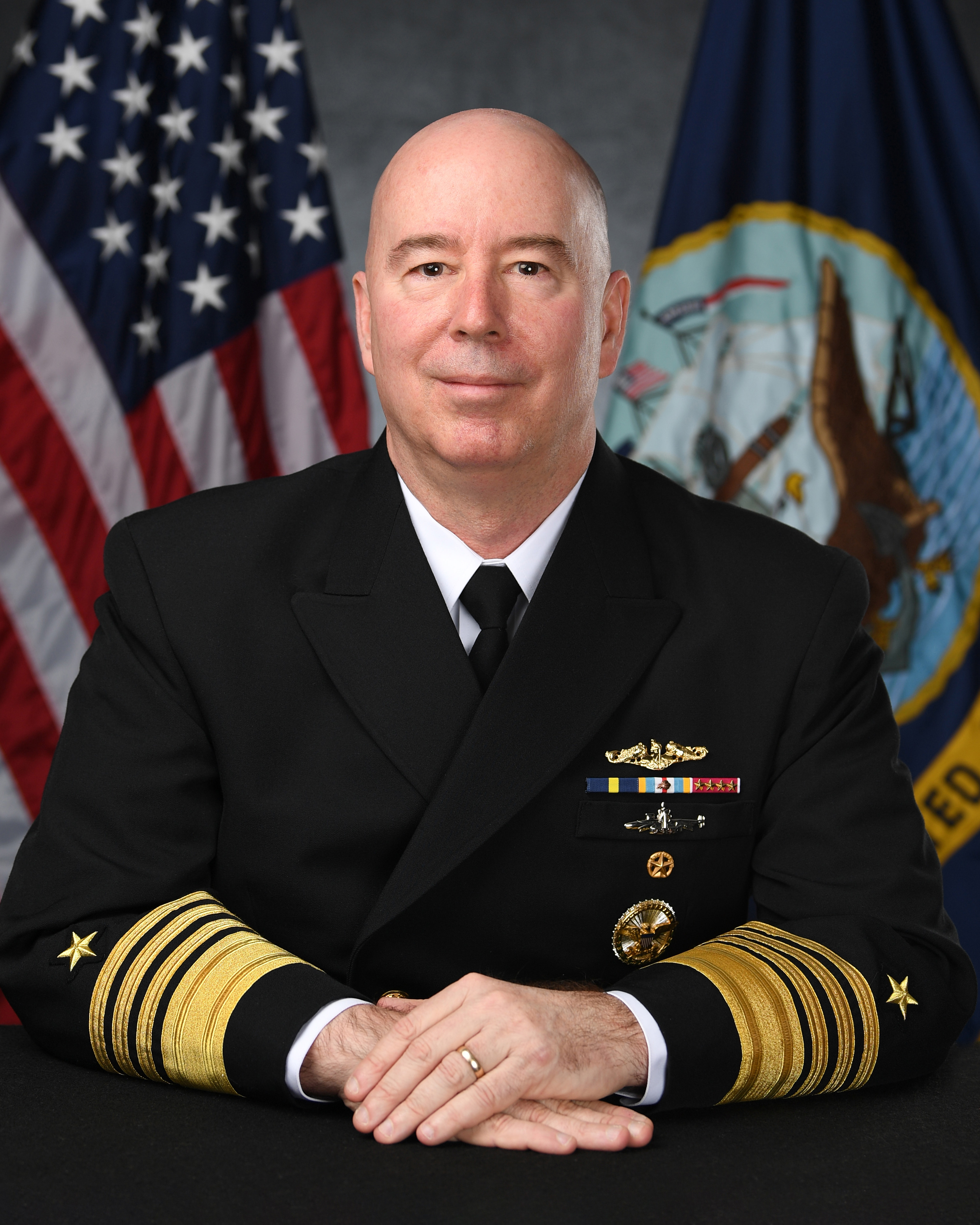
- Born: 1968 (age 57–58); Buffalo, New York, U.S.
- Military career
- Allegiance: United States
- Branch: United States Navy
- Service years: 1990–present
- Rank: Admiral
- Commands: Naval Reactors; Naval Submarine Forces; Submarine Force Atlantic; Submarine Force, U.S. Pacific Fleet; Allied Submarine Command; Submarine Group 8 Naval Surface and Mine Warfighting Development Center; USS Hampton (SSN-767)
- Awards: Defense Superior Service Medal (2); Legion of Merit (4)

William Joseph Houston (born 1968) is a United States Navy admiral, serving as director of the Naval Nuclear Propulsion Program since 10 January 2024. He most recently served as commander of the Naval Submarine Forces, Submarine Force Atlantic and Allied Submarine Command from 2021 to 2023. He also served as Director of the Undersea Warfare Division from 2020 to 2021. Previously, he was the Director of Plans and Operations of the United States Naval Forces Europe-Africa, Deputy Commander of the United States Sixth Fleet, and the Commander of Submarine Group 8.

Raised in Grand Island, New York, Houston earned a Bachelor of Science degree in electrical engineering from the University of Notre Dame in 1990. He later received a Master of Business Administration degree from the College of William & Mary.

In May 2023, Houston was nominated for promotion to admiral and appointment as director of the Naval Nuclear Propulsion Program.

== Awards and decorations ==

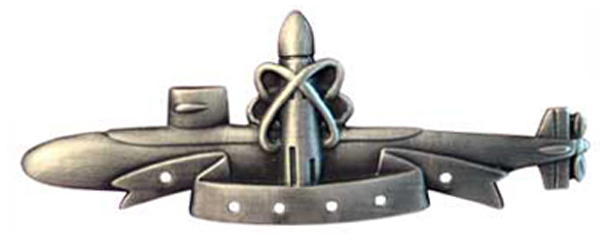

Officer Submarine Warfare insignia
Navy Distinguished Service Medal		Defense Superior Service Medal w/ 1 bronze oak leaf cluster
Legion of Merit w/ 4 award stars	Meritorious Service Medal w/ 3 award stars	Navy and Marine Corps Commendation Medal w/ 4 award stars
Navy and Marine Corps Achievement Medal	Navy Unit Commendation	Navy Meritorious Unit Commendation
Navy "E" Ribbon with three Battle E awards	Navy Expeditionary Medal	National Defense Service Medal w/ 1 service star
Armed Forces Expeditionary Medal	Global War on Terrorism Service Medal	Navy Sea Service Deployment Ribbon w/ 4 bronze service stars
Navy Arctic Service Ribbon	Navy Expert Rifleman Ribbon	Navy Expert Pistol Shot Ribbon
Silver SSBN Deterrent Patrol insignia (5 awards)
Command at Sea insignia
Office of the Secretary of Defense Identification Badge

Military offices
Preceded by ???	Deputy Director for Strategic Targeting and Nuclear Mission Planning of the United States Strategic Command; 2017–2019	Succeeded by Anthony C. Carullo
Preceded by Thomas E. Ishee	Director of Plans and Operations of the United States Naval Forces Europe-Africa, Deputy Commander of the United States Sixth Fleet, and the Commander of Submarine Group Eight; 2019–2020	Succeeded by Anthony C. Carullo
Preceded by Thomas E. Ishee	Director of Undersea Warfare Division of the United States Navy; 2020–2021	Succeeded by Douglas G. Perry
Preceded by Daryl L. Caudle	Commander of Naval Submarine Forces, Submarine Force Atlantic, and Allied Submarine Command; 2021–2023	Succeeded by Robert Gaucher
Preceded by James F. Caldwell Jr.	Director of the Naval Nuclear Propulsion Program; 2024–present	Incumbent
