= USS Medregal =

Submarine of the United States

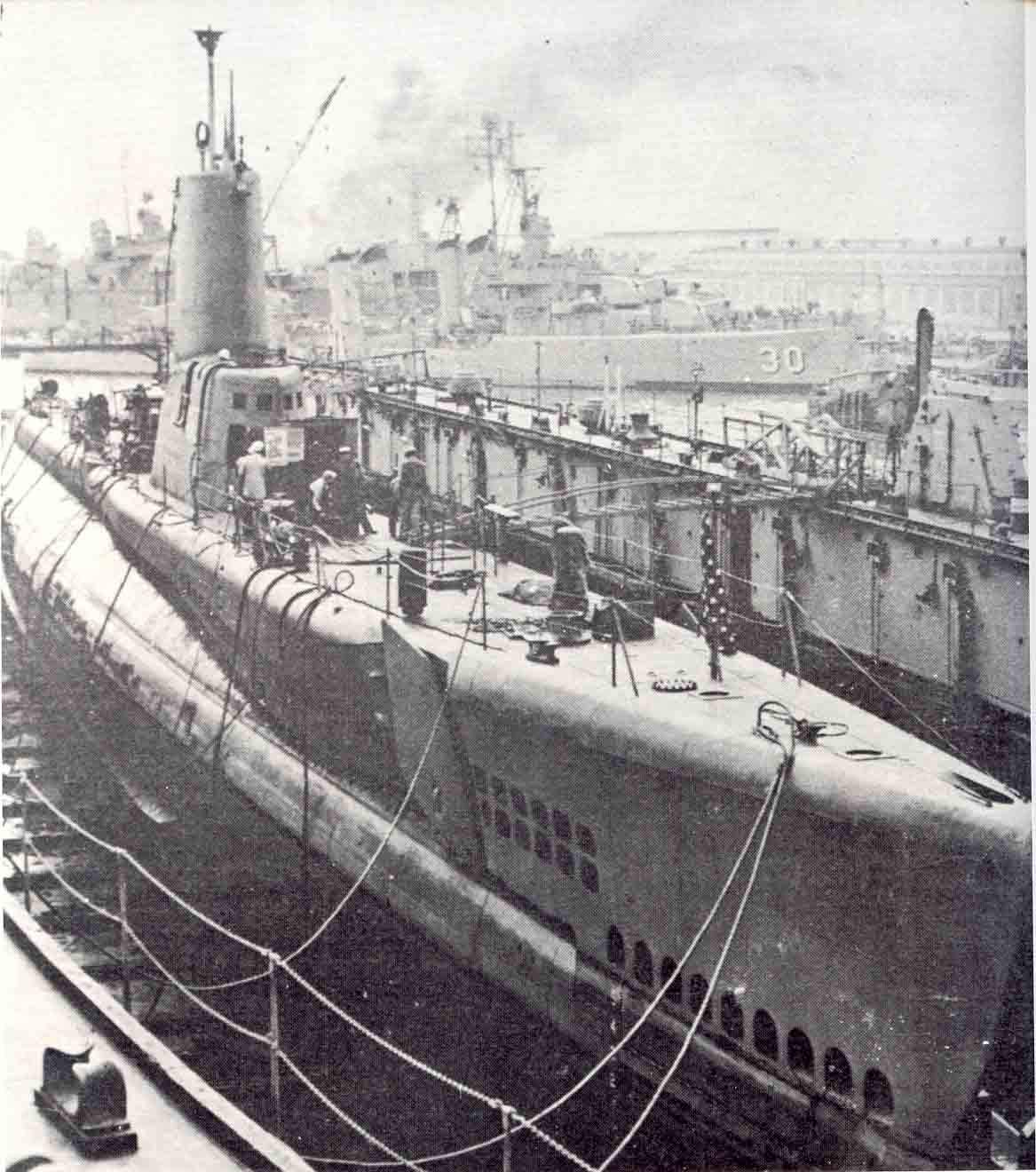

History

United States
- Builder: Portsmouth Naval Shipyard, Kittery, Maine
- Laid down: 21 August 1944
- Launched: 15 December 1944
- Commissioned: 14 April 1945
- Decommissioned: 1 August 1970
- Stricken: 1 August 1970
- Fate: Sold for scrap, 13 June 1972

General characteristics
- Class & type: Tench-class diesel-electric submarine
- Displacement: 1,570 tons (1,595 t) surfaced; 2,414 tons (2,453 t) submerged
- Length: 311 ft 8 in (95.00 m)
- Beam: 27 ft 4 in (8.33 m)
- Draft: 17 ft (5.2 m) maximum
- Propulsion: 4 × Fairbanks-Morse Model 38D8-⅛ 10-cylinder opposed piston diesel engines driving electrical generators; 2 × 126-cell Sargo batteries; 2 × low-speed direct-drive Elliott electric motors; two propellers; 5,400 shp (4.0 MW) surfaced; 2,740 shp (2.0 MW) submerged
- Speed: 20.25 knots (38 km/h) surfaced; 8.75 knots (16 km/h) submerged
- Range: 11,000 nautical miles (20,000 km) surfaced at 10 knots (19 km/h)
- Endurance: 48 hours at 2 knots (3.7 km/h) submerged; 75 days on patrol
- Test depth: 400 ft (120 m)
- Complement: 10 officers, 71 enlisted
- Armament: 10 × 21-inch (533 mm) torpedo tubes; (6 forward, 4 aft); 28 torpedoes; 1 × 5-inch (127 mm) / 25 caliber deck gun; Bofors 40 mm and Oerlikon 20 mm cannon

USS Medregal (SS-480/AGSS-480), a Tench-class submarine, was the only ship of the United States Navy to be named for the medregal, a streamlined, fast-swimming, bluish-colored fish of the jack family which abounds in waters of the West Indies and in the Atlantic as far north as the Carolinas.

== Construction ==
Medregal's keel was laid down by the Portsmouth Naval Shipyard at Kittery, Maine, on 21 August 1944. She was launched on 15 December 1944, sponsored by Mrs. A. H. Taylor, and was commissioned on 14 April 1945.

== World War II service ==
Medregal departed Portsmouth in April 1945. A collision with a U.S. destroyer escort off the north coast of Panama while submerged caused major damage to the periscope shears and radar, requiring a return to Portsmouth just at the time that Germany surrendered. After repairs and Air/Sea Rescue modifications, Medregal departed New London, Connecticut, on 16 June, and steamed to participate in final operations in the Pacific against the Japanese. The surrender of Japan halted her long Pacific voyage and she returned to the Canal Zone, thence to Key West, Florida, for operations with Submarine Squadron 4.

== Post-war service ==
=== Atlantic Fleet service ===
From late 1945 to mid-1957 Medregal operated out of Key West, training Reserves, supporting activities of the Fleet Sonar School, and taking part in antisubmarine warfare exercises. Her cruises sent her along the east coast from Florida to Virginia, into the Gulf of Mexico and the Caribbean Sea, and to operating areas in the western Atlantic. Periodically she deployed to Guantanamo Bay and Havana, Cuba, as well us to Puerto Rico and islands of the West Indies. From March to November 1952 she underwent conversion to a Fleet Snorkel submarine at Charleston, South Carolina.

On 17 June 1957 Medregal entered Charleston Naval Shipyard for conversion to a missile-guidance submarine. She completed overhaul 22 November, thence steamed to Norfolk, Virginia, for operations with Submarine Squadron 6. During the next 18 months she participated in intermittent missile-evaluation projects in the Caribbean off the Virgin Islands and in the Atlantic out off Puerto Rico.

=== Pacific Fleet service ===
Assigned to Submarine Squadron 3 on 10 July 1959 Medregal departed Norfolk 25 July and steamed to Pearl Harbor, arriving 24 August. She served in Hawaiian waters until sailing 9 January 1960 to the Far East, arriving at U.S. Fleet Activities Yokosuka on 26 January. During the next five months she conducted training and evaluation exercises with units of the U.S. Seventh Fleet, and ranged the western Pacific from Japan to the Philippines.

Returning to Pearl Harbor 1 July, Medregal resumed type and squadron operations between Hawaii and the West Coast. Between September 1961 and March 1962 she made a second deployment with the U.S. Seventh Fleet. In May 1962, Medregal and USS Carbonero, SS-337 participated in Operation Dominic I, Shot Frigate Bird near Christmas Island (now Kiribati). It was the first and only test of a fully operational Polaris missile with a 600 kt thermonuclear warhead, fired from USS Ethan Allan, SSBN-608. In October she steamed to the West Coast for ASW (SLAMEX) and Reserve training out of Puget Sound. She returned to Pearl Harbor in mid-December and for the next two years she maintained her pattern of operations between the Hawaiian Islands and the West Coast.

Medregal departed Pearl Harbor for WestPac in mid-April 1965. Steaming first to Australia, she visited Brisbane, Sydney, and Melbourne, and participated in the commemoration of the Battle of the Coral Sea. Thence, in May she sailed to the Philippines for operations out of Subic Bay. On 13 July 1965 she was in a collision with a freighter while submerged in the South China Sea. Returned to Subic Bay for repairs. Extensive damage was done to the sail, all periscopes and snorkel system were completely inoperative. After patched up in Subic Bay, returned to Pearl Harbor for a short while then to Mare Island, Vellejo, Calif. for major repairs. Arrived back in Pearl Harbor late December 1965.

Back in Pearl Harbor late in 1965, Medregal operated there until departure for Japan 2 July 1966. After reaching Yokosuka on 15 July, she joined Seventh Fleet aircraft carriers and destroyers for ASW operations in the western Pacific, and readiness and alert maneuvers with ships of the Republic of China Navy (based in Taiwan). During the rest of the year she continued to support peacekeeping operations in the troubled Far East.

In January 1967, Medregal returned to her home port in Hawaii where she resumed her type training and squadron exercises with SubRon 1. She continued duty out of Pearl Harbor until 1 May when she was assigned to SubRon 3 out of San Diego, California. On 1 May 1967, Medregal was reclassified with hull classification symbol AGSS-480.

On 6 February 1969 Medregal sank the USS Redfish (SS-395) as a target off the coast of California. Redfish was a combat veteran of World War II.

On 24 June 1969 Medregal departed San Diego for her final WestPac cruise. Stops included Hawaii, Guam, Viet Nam(twice), Subic Bay/Manila (Philippines), Chinhae (South Korea), Yokosuka/Kobe (Japan), Kaohsiung (Taiwan) and Hong Kong. Medregal arrived back in San Diego on 24 December 1969. She continued home port operations there until August 1970.

Medregal was decommissioned and struck from the Naval Vessel Register on 1 August 1970 and sold for scrapping 13 June 1972.

== Awards ==
- American Campaign Medal
- Asiatic-Pacific Campaign Medal
- World War II Victory Medal
- National Defense Service Medal with star
- Vietnam Service Medal
