= Submarine Squadron 2 =

United States Navy unit

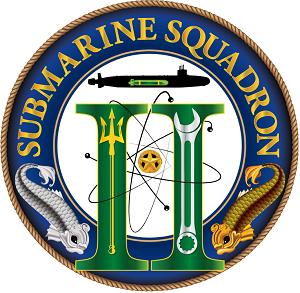
- Active: 1945–2012; 2021–present
- Country: United States of America
- Branch: United States Navy
- Type: Submarine Squadron
- Part of: Submarine Force Atlantic(COMSUBLANT)
- Garrison/HQ: Portsmouth Naval Shipyard
- Equipment: Nuclear Attack Submarines

Commanders
- Current Commodore: CAPT Jason M. Deichler

Submarine Squadron Two (SUBRON 2) is a United States Navy submarine squadron based at Portsmouth Naval Shipyard in Kittery, Maine.

== History ==
Submarine Squadron 2 started World War II at Mariveles Naval Section Base in the Philippines as part of the United States Asiatic Fleet. It was equipped with twelve Salmon-class submarines.

Following the end of World War II, Submarine Squadron Two was established in October 1945 at the Naval Submarine Base New London in Groton, Connecticut under the command of Captain L. S. Parks, USN. The squadron was based in Groton throughout its subsequent history. It was a subordinate command of Submarine Group 2 (designated as Submarine Flotilla 2 prior to the mid-1970s).

During the course of its history, SUBRON 2 had almost 100 submarines assigned to it ranging from World War II era Gato-class submarines to Los Angeles-class nuclear attack submarines. From the 1950s to the 1970s SUBRON 2 had GUPPY submarines (modified World War II fleet submarines) assigned to it. The first nuclear submarine, USS Nautilus was assigned to SUBRON 2 at one point. SUBRON 2 had up to 12 submarines assigned to it at any given time.

SUBRON 2 was an administrative command. When its submarines were on patrol they were under the operational command of Commander, Submarines, Atlantic Fleet (COMSUBLANT).

SUBRON 2 was disestablished on 13 January 2012. In December 2021, Submarine Squadron 2 was re-established at Portsmouth Naval Shipyard to provide administrative support for Los Angeles- and Virginia-class fast attack submarines homeported at Portsmouth Naval Shipyard during periods of maintenance and improvement. Capt. Daniel J. Reiss was the first commanding officer of the newly re-established squadron.

== Current organization ==
- Commander, Submarine Squadron 2 (CSS 2):
  - Los Angeles-class submarines:
    - USS Cheyenne (SSN-773)
  - Virginia-class submarines:
    - USS North Dakota (SSN-784)
    - USS Washington (SSN-787)
