= Naval Submarine Base New London =

US Navy installation in Connecticut

- Groton, Connecticut
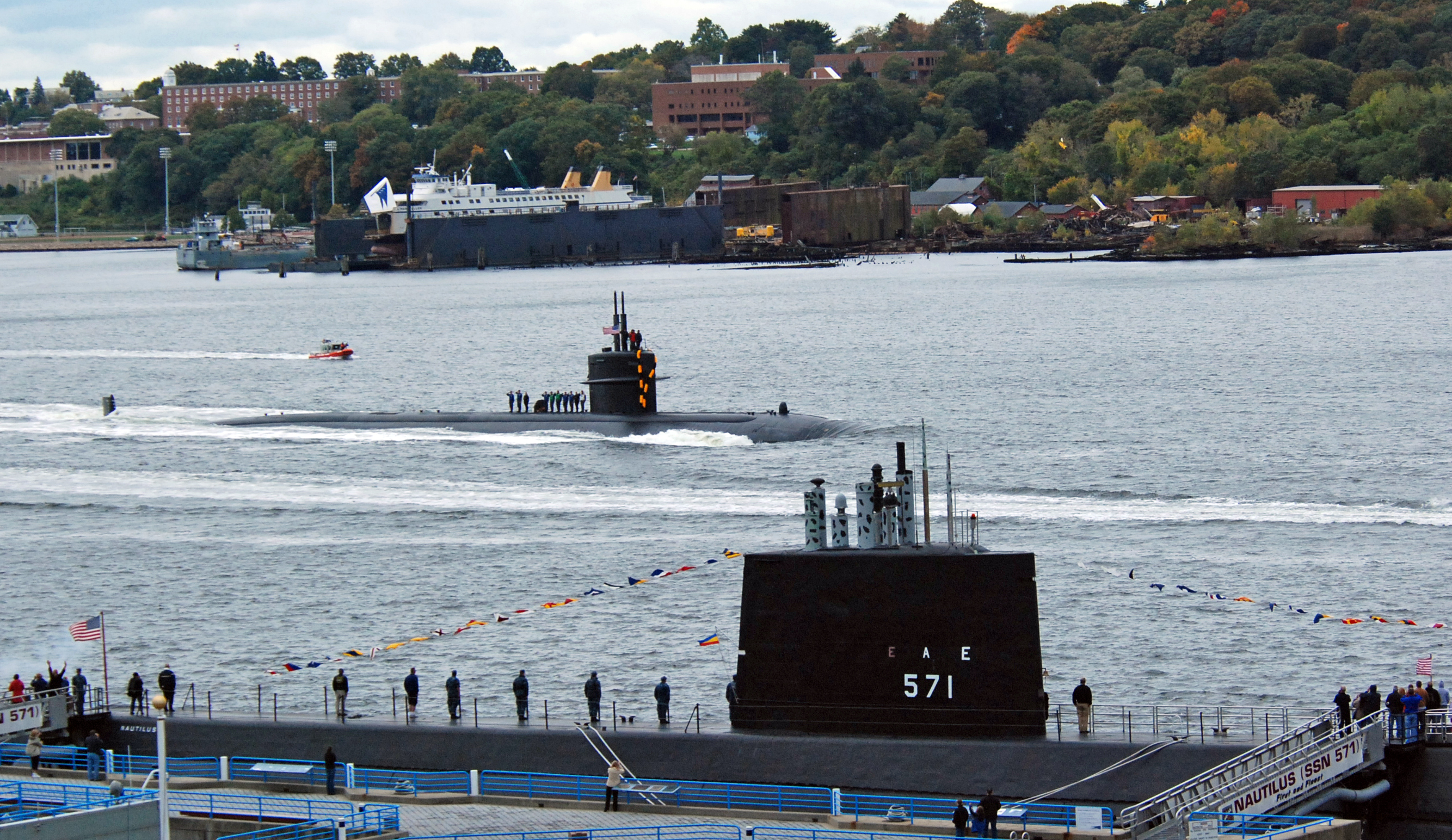
- USS Pittsburgh returns home after deployment

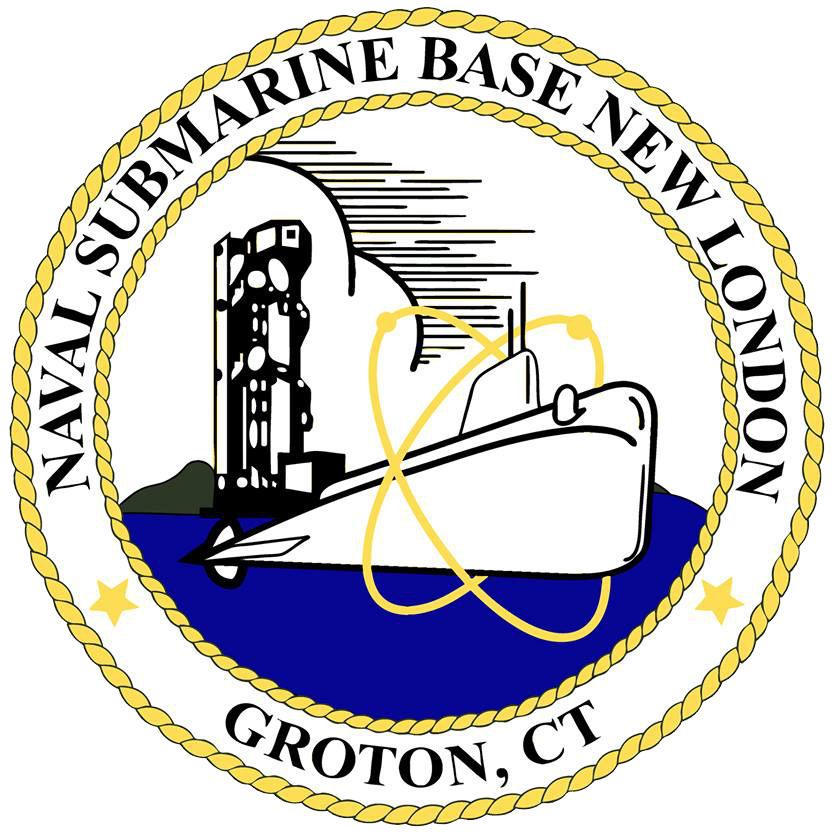

Site information
- Type: Military base
- Owner: United States of America
- Controlled by: United States Navy

Location
- Location within Connecticut Location within the United States
- Coordinates: 41.398°N 72.087°W

Site history
- In use: 1868–present

Garrison information
- Current commander: Captain Craig E. Litty

Naval Submarine Base New London is the primary United States Navy East Coast submarine base, also known as the "Home of the Submarine Force." It is located in Groton, Connecticut, directly across the Thames River from its namesake city of New London.

== History ==
In 1868, the State of Connecticut gave the Navy exactly 112 acres (0.45 km^{2}) of land along the Thames River in Groton to build a Naval Station. Due to a lack of federal funding, it was not until 1872 that the two brick buildings and a T-shaped pier were constructed and officially declared a Navy Yard. In 1898, Congress approved a coaling station to be built at the Yard for refueling small naval ships traveling through the waters of New England. The Navy Yard was first used for laying up inactive ships. The Congressional appropriations were small and the Navy had little need for the yard, which was closed from 1898 to 1900 and its personnel reassigned. By 1912, oil replaced coal in warships and again the Yard was scheduled for closure and the land relinquished by the Navy.

=== Submarine base established ===
The Navy Yard was spared permanent closure in 1912 by an impassioned plea from Congressman Edwin W. Higgins of Norwich, who was worried about the loss of Federal spending in the region.

On 18 October 1915, the submarines G-1, G-2, and G-4 arrived in Groton, along with the monitor Ozark serving as a submarine tender. The submarines D-1, D-2, D-3, and E-1 arrived shortly after, along with the submarine tender Tonopah and the destroyer Columbus.

Additional submarines and support craft arrived the following year, and the facility was named as the Navy's first submarine base. The first commander of the Yard was retired Commodore Timothy A. Hunt, who was recalled to service. He was living in New Haven, and he used the Central Hotel on State Street, New London when in town to attend to Yard duties on an "as needed" basis. The submarine base is physically located in the Town of Groton, but New London became associated with it because the base had its post office, main offices, and housing in New London. The Navy established schools and training facilities at the base after World War I.

=== Wartime expansion ===
The base property expanded during the latter part of World War I. Congress since approved over a million dollars for base real estate and facilities expansion. By the end of the war, 81 buildings had been built to support 1,400 men and 20 submarines, although the land expansion was slowed through much of the 1920s. However, the Great Depression of the 1930s saw an expansion and enhancement of the physical plant of the base. President Franklin D. Roosevelt created a series of Federal Government employment programs that contributed significantly to the submarine base.

Over 26 warehouses, barracks, and workshops were built at the base under these Federal job-spending programs. The second largest expansion of the base occurred during World War II, when it grew from 112 acres to 497 acres (2.01 km^{2}). The Submarine Force leaped in size, and the base accommodated thousands of men to serve the growing combat fleet. Immediately after World War II, the Submarine Force was significantly reduced and many submarines were sent into storage. Most of the World War II fleet was sold for scrap metal during the early 1960s.

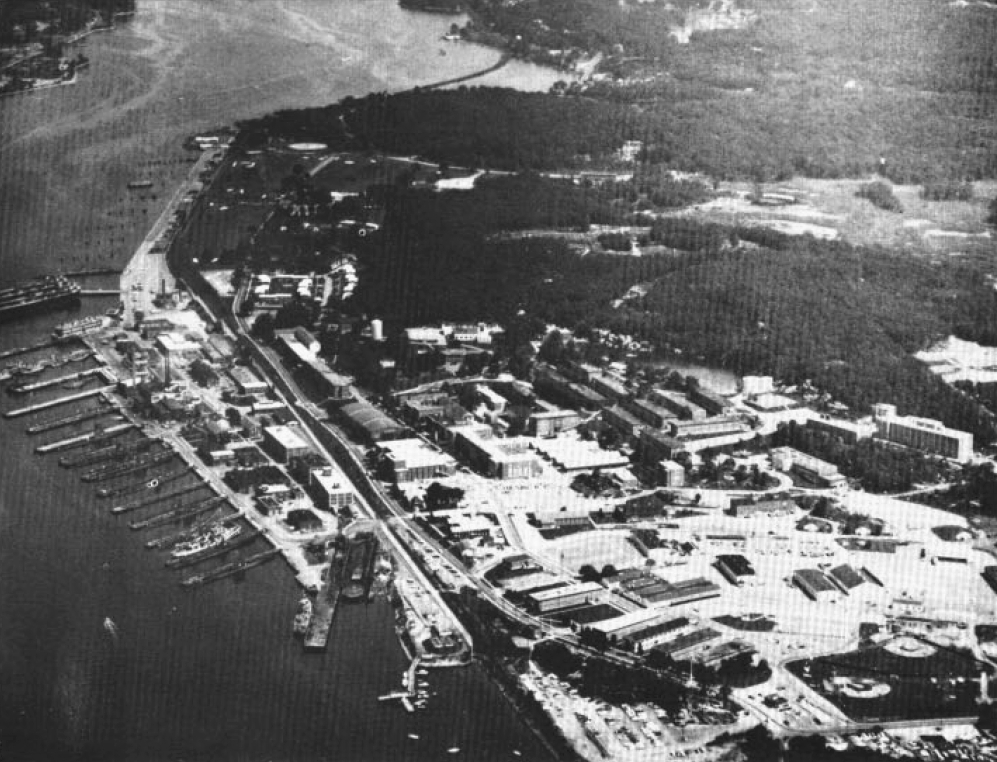
1968 aerial view of Naval Submarine Base New London looking north

From 1930 to 1994, the most recognizable structure on the base was the 100-foot-tall (30 m) Escape Training Tank. Generations of submariners learned to escape in up to 80 feet (24 m) of water using buoyant ascent, and were trained in the use of the Momsen lung or Steinke hood. In 2007, the Escape Training Tank was replaced by the Submarine Escape Trainer, which has two types of escape trunks in up to 40 feet (12 m) of water. The Steinke hood was replaced by the Submarine Escape Immersion Equipment in the 2000s.

=== Submarine school ===
The New London base is home port to 16 attack submarines. The base is also neighbor to the major submarine construction yard of General Dynamics' Electric Boat Division. All officer and enlisted submariners are stationed at Groton during their training, except for nuclear trained Electronics Technicians (ETs), Electrician's Mates (EMs), and Machinist's Mates (MMs). Enlisted sailors attending sub school will first go through Basic Enlisted Sub School (BESS), an eight-week program that teaches the rigours of undersea life. BESS includes training in shoring, patching leaks and ruptured pipes, firefighting, and boat handling techniques. After BESS, sailors will either go to a boat or to follow-on schools.

The main base occupies more than 687 acres (2.78 km^{2}) plus over 530 acres (2.1 km^{2}) of family housing. It also supports more than 70 tenant commands, including Naval Submarine School (NAVSUBSCOL), Naval Submarine Support Facility (NSSF), three Submarine Squadron staffs, and the housing and support facilities for more than 21,000 civilian workers, active-duty service members, and their families.

=== Base realignment and proposed closure ===
On 13 May 2005, the Pentagon recommended that the base be closed. After review, the 2005 Base Realignment and Closure Commission voted on 24 August 2005 to strike New London from the list of possible closures.

== Garrison ==
Current units stationed at NSBNL include:

- Naval Submarine School
- Submarine Learning Center
- Naval Branch Health Clinic
- Naval Submarine Medical Research Laboratory
- Naval Undersea Medical Institute
- Navy Information Operations Detachment
- Commander, Submarine Group 2
  - Commander, Submarine Squadron 4 (CSS 4):
    - Virginia-class submarines:
      - USS Virginia (SSN-774)
      - USS South Dakota (SSN-790)
      - USS Hyman G. Rickover (SSN-795)
      - USS Iowa (SSN-797)
      - Pre-Commissioning Unit (PCU) USS Idaho (SSN-799)
      - Pre-Commissioning Unit (PCU) USS Tang (SSN-805)
  - Commander, Submarine Squadron 12 (CSS 12):
    - Los Angeles-class submarines:
      - USS Hartford (SSN-768)
    - Virginia-class submarines:
      - USS Texas (SSN-775)
      - USS California (SSN-781)
      - USS Delaware (SSN-791)
      - Pre-Commissioning Unit (PCU) USS Utah (SSN-801)
      - Pre-Commissioning Unit (PCU) USS Arizona (SSN-803)

== See also ==
- Atlantic Reserve Fleet, New London
- Submarine Force Library and Museum
- Naval Submarine Medical Research Laboratory
- United States Navy submarine bases
