= Submarine Squadron 19 =

Submarine Squadron Nineteen
- Active: March 2004–present
- Country: United States of America
- Branch: United States Navy
- Part of: U.S. Pacific Fleet (USPACFLT)
- Garrison/HQ: Bangor, Washington
- Motto(s): "Incursus Profundum" ("Strike Deep")

Commanders
- Current commander: Commodore - Captain Dale Klein

Submarine Squadron 19 (also known as SUBRON 19) is a squadron of submarines of the United States Navy based in Bangor, Washington under the command of Captain Dale Klein. The submarines that make up SUBRON 19 include:

- Commander, Submarine Squadron 19 (CSS 19):
  - Los Angeles-class submarines:
    - USS San Juan (SSN-751) (Active (Reserve), Awaiting Decommissioning)
    - USS Topeka (SSN-754) (Active (Reserve), Awaiting Decommissioning)
  - Ohio-class submarines:
    - USS Ohio (SSBN-726)
    - USS Michigan (SSBN-727)
    - USS Pennsylvania (SSBN-735)

== See also ==
- History of the United States Navy
