= Submarine Group 2 =

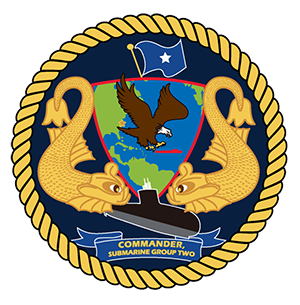
- Patch
- Active: 1965–2014; 2019-present
- Country: United States of America
- Branch: United States Navy
- Part of: Commander, Naval Submarine Force Atlantic (COMSUBLANT)
- Garrison/HQ: Naval Support Activity Hampton Roads, Building NH-13
- Mottos: Paratus Dominari, "Ready to Dominate"

Commanders
- Commander: RDML Melvin R Smith

Submarine Group 2 (also known as SUBGRU 2) is a seagoing group of the United States Navy based at Naval Support Activity Hampton Roads, Norfolk, Virginia.

== History ==
Between 1965 and 2014, Submarine Group 2 was responsible for the administrative control of attack submarines to include training and maintenance. It was headquartered at the Naval Submarine Base New London in Groton, Connecticut and was a subordinate command of Commander, Naval Submarine Force Atlantic (COMSUBLANT). Prior to the mid-1970s, it was designated Submarine Flotilla 2. Submarine Group 2 was disestablished on August 22, 2014. Three submarine squadron commanders, who oversee attack submarines stationed in Connecticut and Virginia, reported from that point on to COMSUBLANT, headquartered in Norfolk, Virginia.

Prior to its disestablishment in 2014, the subordinate units of Submarine Group 2 included -

- Submarine Squadron 2 (decommissioned in 2012)
- Submarine Squadron 4 (activated in 1997)
- Submarine Squadron 10 (decommissioned in 1991)
- Submarine Development Squadron 2
- Submarine Squadron 14 (decommissioned in 1992)

"A smooth and responsible 'sundown' of Submarine Group 2 has been our objective for the past year. We deliberately sought to make it seamless," said last commander Rear Admiral Kenneth Perry. "We make that transition now, the result of thoughtful planning and solid teamwork." The personnel who staffed Submarine Group 2's 45 military and civilian positions in Groton were reassigned.

== Reestablishment 2019 onwards ==
On 30 September 2019, Submarine Group 2 was re-established with a new headquarters in Norfolk, Virginia. The United States Navy restored Submarine Group 2 in order to enhance its capacity to command and control undersea warfare forces seamlessly across the Atlantic.

Submarine Group 2 is the Commander, Task Force (CTF) 84. CTF 84 is the theater undersea warfare commander (TUSWC) for U.S. Fleet Forces Command. Additionally, the command is capable of operating as an embedded task force within U.S. 2nd Fleet or U.S. 4th Fleet as assigned.

"We will prepare forces to control the undersea domain through rigorous competitive training, and a thorough understanding of our adversaries and the environment where we both operate", said the re-establishing commander Rear Admiral James Waters. "Further, we will innovate and advance the art of theater anti-submarine warfare through complex fleet exercises and war games."

On May 26, 2021, the U.S. Navy announced that Rear Admiral (lower half) Brian L. Davies would be assigned additional duties as deputy commander, Second Fleet, Norfolk, Virginia. He was to retain all currently assigned duties as Commander, Submarine Group 2, Norfolk, Virginia.
