= Robert Gaucher =

U.S. Navy flag officer

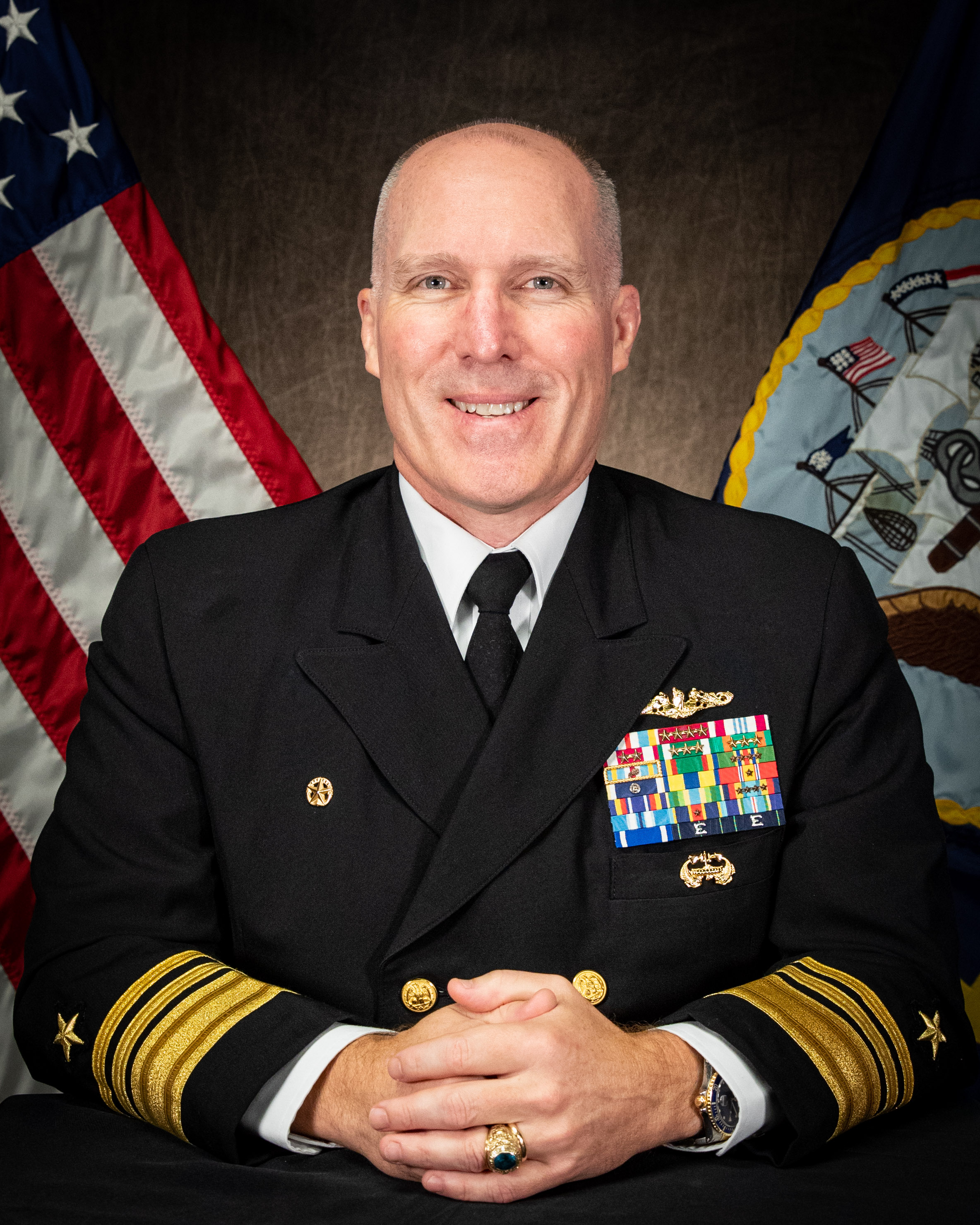
- Official portrait, 2023
- Born: c. 1969 (age 56–57)
- Military career
- Allegiance: United States
- Branch: United States Navy
- Service years: 1991–present
- Rank: Vice Admiral
- Commands: Naval Submarine Forces; Submarine Force Atlantic; Submarine Group 9 Task Group 114.3; Submarine Development Squadron 5 USS City of Corpus Christi (SSN-705)
- Awards: Defense Superior Service Medal; Legion of Merit (5)

Robert M. Gaucher (born c. 1969) is a United States Navy vice admiral who serves as the Director, Submarine Programs within the Office of the Secretary of Defense (OSD) and is responsible for the acquisition and sustainment of the submarine fleet. He previously served as the commander of Naval Submarine Forces, Submarine Force Atlantic, and Allied Submarine Command. He previously served as director of strategic integration of the U.S Navy.

In April 2023, Gaucher was nominated for promotion to vice admiral and appointment as commander of Naval Submarine Forces, Submarine Force Atlantic, and Allied Submarine Command.

Military offices
| Preceded by James P. Waters | Director of Maritime Headquarters of the United States Pacific Fleet; 2019–2021 | Succeeded by Christopher J. Cavanaugh |
| Preceded by Douglas G. Perry | Commander of Submarine Group 9 and Task Group 114.3; 2021–2022 | Succeeded by Mark Behning |
| Preceded by Richard A. Correll | Director of Strategic Integration of the United States Navy; 2022–2023 | Succeeded by Oliver T. Lewis |
| Preceded by William J. Houston | Commander of Naval Submarine Forces, Submarine Force Atlantic, and Allied Submarine Command; 2023–2026 | Succeeded by Richard E. Seif Jr. |
| Preceded by Position Established | Director, Submarine Programs; 2026-Present | Succeeded by N/A |
