= USS California (SSN-781) =

US Navy Virginia-class submarine

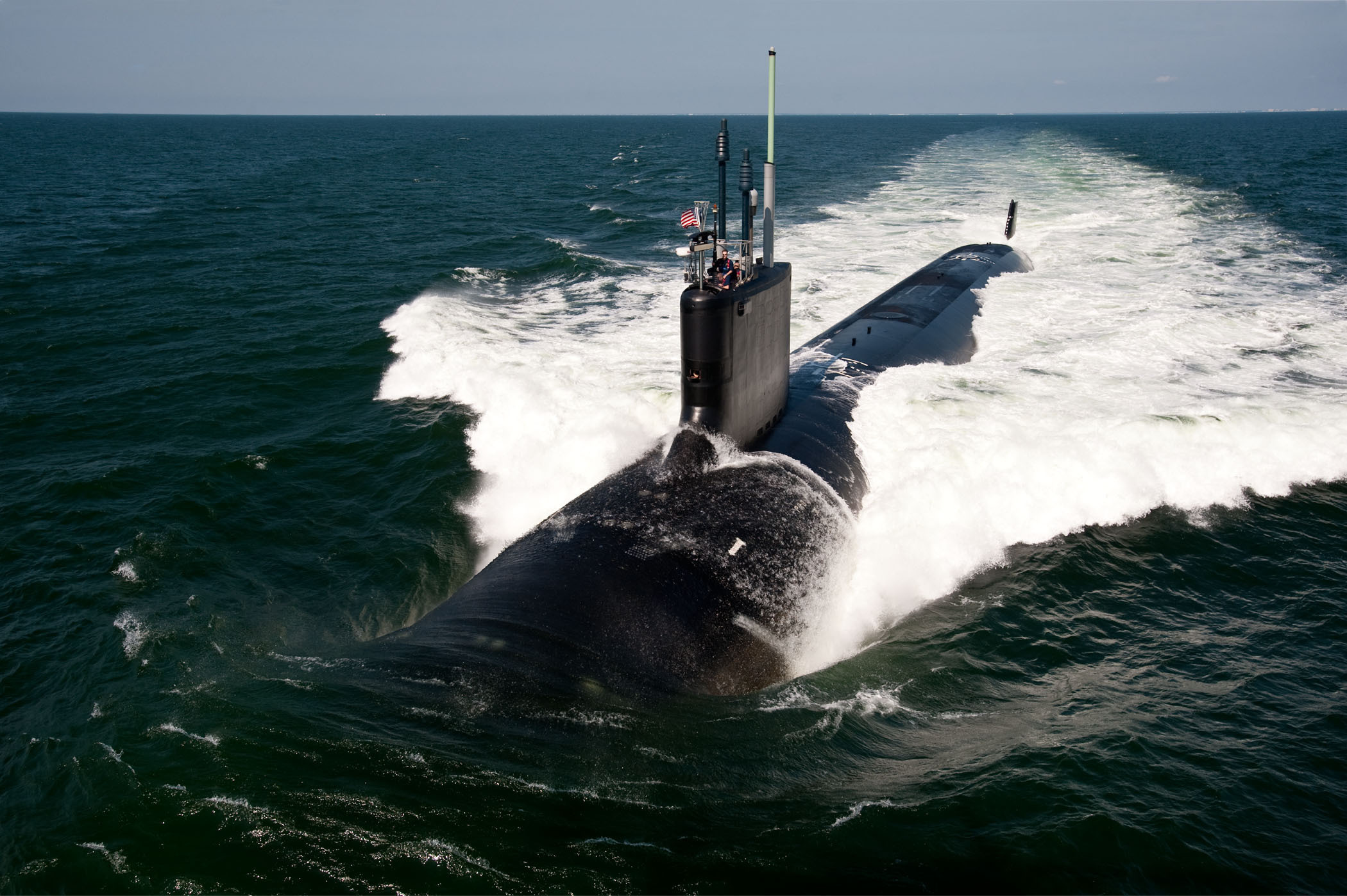
- USS California underway

History

United States
- Name: USS California
- Namesake: State of California
- Awarded: 14 August 2003
- Builder: Huntington Ingalls Industries - Newport News Shipbuilding
- Laid down: 1 May 2009
- Sponsored by: Mrs. Donna Willard
- Christened: 6 November 2010
- Launched: 14 November 2010
- Commissioned: 29 October 2011
- Home port: Groton, Connecticut
- Motto: Silentium Est Aureum; ("Silence Is Golden")
- Status: Ship in active service
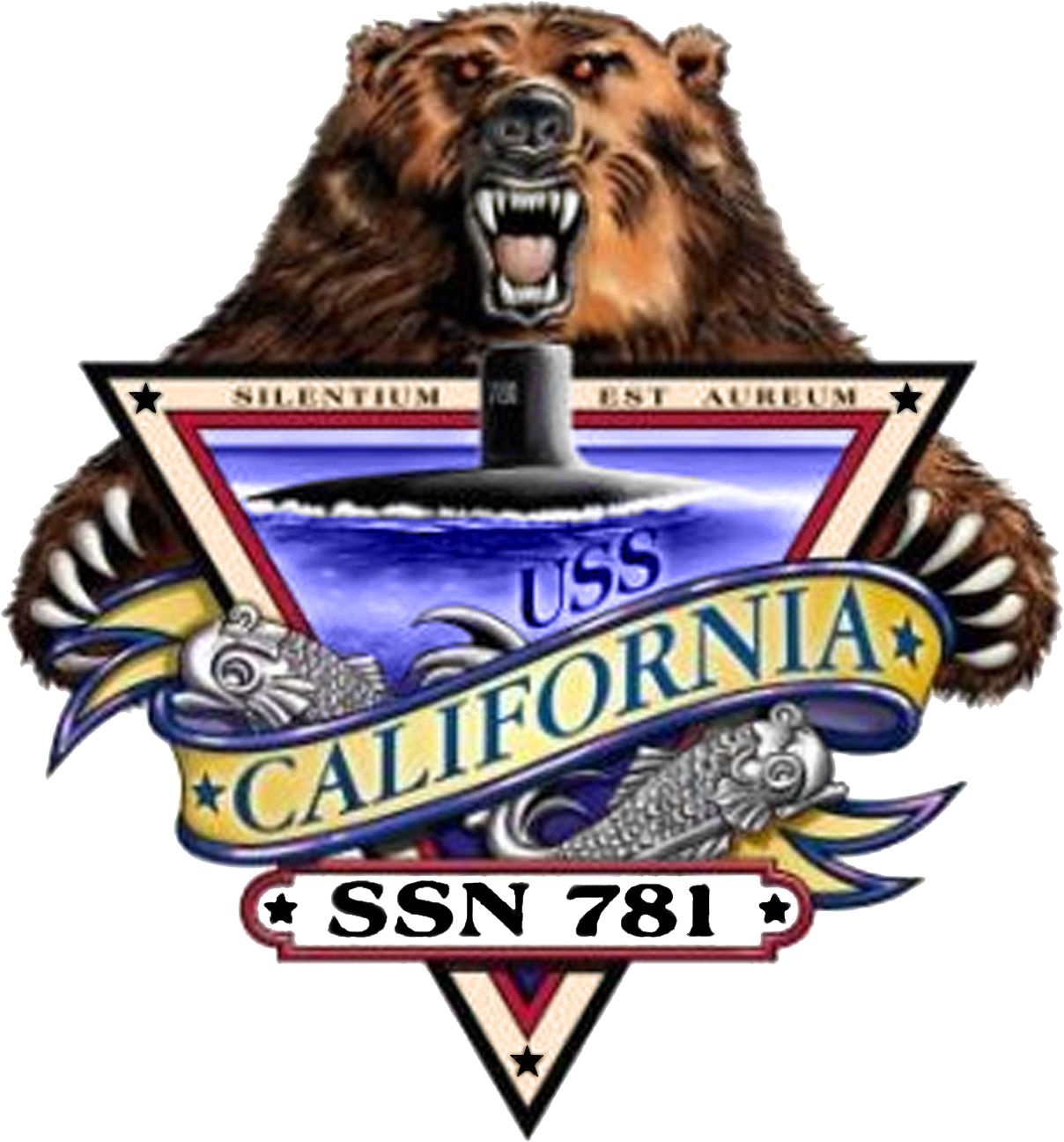
- Badge

General characteristics
- Class & type: Virginia-class submarine
- Displacement: 7,800 tons light; 7,900 tons full
- Length: 114.9 m (377.0 ft)
- Beam: 10.3 m (33.8 ft)
- Propulsion: 1 × S9G PWR nuclear reactor 280,000 shp (210 MW), HEU 93%; 2 × steam turbines 40,000 shp (30 MW); 1 × single shaft pump-jet propulsor; 1 × secondary propulsion motor
- Speed: greater than 25 knots (46 km/h)
- Range: Essentially unlimited distance; 33 years
- Test depth: greater than 800 ft (240 m)
- Complement: 134 officers and crew

USS California (SSN-781), is the eighth Virginia-class submarine, and the seventh United States Navy ship named for the state of California. The contract to build her was awarded to Newport News Shipbuilding (then called Newport News Shipbuilding & Drydock Co.) in Newport News, Virginia, on 14 August 2003. Construction began in December 2006. California's keel was laid down on 1 May 2009. She was christened on 6 November 2010, sponsored by Donna Willard, wife of Admiral Robert F. Willard. She was launched eight days later, on 14 November 2010.

California is the first Virginia-class submarine built with the advanced electromagnetic signature reduction system; although it will be retrofitted into older submarines of the class.

California was delivered to the Navy on 7 August 2011, eight and a half months ahead of schedule. The $2.3 billion ship was commissioned on 29 October 2011 in Norfolk, Virginia.
