= Submarine squadron =

Naval formation or unit

A submarine squadron (SUBRON) is a naval formation or unit in such states such as the United Kingdom, United States, and Russia/Soviet Union. In France the equivalent unit is the escadrille des sous-marins nucléaires d'attaque (ESNA), part of the French submarine forces (and before the Second World War, escadrilles de sous-marins).

== Royal Navy ==
Submarine flotillas became submarine divisions in 1952. HMS Finwhale was a Porpoise-class submarine belonging first to Faslane's 3rd Submarine Squadron and then to Singapore's 7th Submarine Squadron (United Kingdom).

From the early 1960s the structure was:

- 1st Submarine Squadron – HMS Dolphin (shore establishment)
- 2nd Submarine Squadron – Plymouth
- 3rd Submarine Squadron – Faslane
- 4th Submarine Squadron
- 4th Submarine Division – Sydney (established 1948, disbanded 1969)
- 5th Submarine Division – Malta. It was announced on 31 July 1964, that British submarines were to leave Malta. Captain C.H. Hammer was last Captain S.M. 5. HMS Ausonia, the division depot ship, set sail for the UK on 7 August 1964, and then paid off. Submarine depot ships at Malta were Forth (1948–1960), HMS Narvik (1960–1962), and then Ausonia from 1962 to 1964.
- 6th Submarine Division – Halifax, Nova Scotia Three A-class submarines arrived 1954, HMS Auriga served with the division, disbanded c. 1967)
- 7th Submarine Division – Singapore (disbanded by 1971)
- 10th Submarine Squadron – Formed Faslane late 1960s for the SSBNs

In 1971 HMNB Clyde at Faslane in Scotland was home to the Third Submarine Squadron of Nuclear Fleet and Diesel Patrol Submarines, 'the fighters', and the 10th Submarine Squadron consisting of the four Polaris submarines, 'the bombers'. The Base also conducted the training of all submarines before they joined their Squadrons and this was known as 'work up'. On the decommissioning of the Polaris submarines the 10th Submarine Squadron re-equipped with Vanguard-class ballistic missile submarines.

1st Submarine Squadron was located at HMS Dolphin during the early 1990s. In 2001, the five Swiftsure-class submarines were part of the 1st Submarine Squadron based at Faslane and the seven Trafalgar-class boats were with the Second Submarine Squadron at Devonport.

See List of squadrons and flotillas of the Royal Navy.

== Canada ==
From 1966 to 1996 the First Canadian Submarine Squadron was in existence with the Royal Canadian Navy's three Oberon-class submarines.

== United States Navy ==
Up until World War II and for a little after, submarine squadrons could have several Submarine Divisions (SubDivs), often pairs of submarines. Reserve submarine divisions also existed after World War II.

A SUBRON usually consists of three or more submarines. It is the submarine force equivalent to a destroyer squadron in the surface Navy. The officer in charge of SUBRON ONE is designated Commander Submarine Squadron One or COMSUBRON ONE. However, unlike a destroyer squadron—which actually moves its staff aboard its ships and deploys with them as an operational Task Element commander—a SUBRON commander and his staff always remain in homeport, and are responsible only for the training, equipping and administering of the ships under its umbrella. A submarine squadron is usually commanded by a Captain (O-6) who has already had at least one tour as commander of a submarine.

Several submarine squadrons may be organized into a Submarine Group (SUBGRU), headed under a flag officer. For instance, SUBRON 17, SUBRON 19 and DEVRON 5 are part of SUBGRU 9 in Bangor, Washington. The overall responsibility for submarines on the west coast of the United States is taken by the Commander Submarine Force, U.S. Pacific Fleet (COMSUBPAC); on the east coast, the same responsibility rests with the Commander Submarine Force, Atlantic Fleet (COMSUBLANT). The latter is the senior of the two, and thus also plays a secondary role as Commander, Submarine Force (COMSUBFOR).

When a submarine deploys, for instance as part of a carrier strike group, operational command is transferred to the numbered fleet commander for the theater to which the submarine is deploying, e.g., Commander Fifth Fleet.

=== List of submarine squadrons ===
Odd numbered squadrons are West Coast (Pacific Fleet), even numbered East Coast (Atlantic Fleet).

==== Pacific Fleet squadrons ====
| Squadron name | Base | Status | Notes |
|---|---|---|---|
| Submarine Squadron 1 (SUBRON1) | Naval Station Pearl Harbor; Pearl Harbor, Hawaii | Active (1941–Present) | |
| Submarine Squadron 3 (SUBRON3) | Naval Station Pearl Harbor; Pearl Harbor, Hawaii | Decommissioned (2012) | Consolidated under SUBRON 1 & 7 in 2012 |
| Submarine Development Squadron 5 (DEVRON5) | Naval Base Kitsap; Bangor, Washington | Active | |
| Submarine Squadron 7 (SUBRON7) | Naval Station Pearl Harbor; Pearl Harbor, Hawaii | Active (1951–Present) | |
| Submarine Squadron 11 (SUBRON11) | Naval Base Point Loma; San Diego, California | Active | |
| Submarine Squadron 15 (SUBRON15) | Naval Base Guam; Apra Harbor, Guam | Active | |
| Submarine Squadron 17 (SUBRON17) | Naval Base Kitsap; Bangor, Washington | Active | |
| Submarine Squadron 19 (SUBRON19) | Naval Base Kitsap; Bangor, Washington | Active | |
| Submarine Squadron 21 (SUBRON21) | Manama, Bahrain | Active (2014–Present) | |

==== Atlantic Fleet squadrons ====
| Squadron name | Base | Status | Notes |
|---|---|---|---|
| Submarine Squadron 2 (SUBRON2) | Portsmouth Naval Shipyard, Kittery, Maine | Decommissioned (2012) from Submarine Base New London. Recommissioned in 2021 in Portsmouth https://www.navy.mil/Press-Office/News-Stories/Article/2870423/us-navy-establishes-submarine-squadron-two-at-portsmouth-naval-shipyard/ | Consolidated under SUBRON 4 in 2012 |
| Submarine Squadron 4 (SUBRON4) | Naval Submarine Base New London; Groton, Connecticut | Active (1997–Present) | |
| Submarine Squadron 6 (SUBRON6) | Naval Station Norfolk; Norfolk, Virginia | Active | |
| Submarine Squadron 8 (SUBRON8) | Naval Station Norfolk; Norfolk, Virginia | Active | Consolidated under SUBRON 6 in 2011. Reestablished February 18, 2022. Responsible for the control of new submarine construction and ongoing submarine operating maintenance schedules of Los Angeles-class attack submarines and Virginia-class submarines homeported in Norfolk, Va. |
| Submarine Squadron 10 (SUBRON10) | Naval Submarine Base New London; Groton, Connecticut | Decommissioned (1991) | First all nuclear submarine squadron. Originally activated during World War II. Stationed at State Pier in New London, Connecticut from circa 1951 to 1991. |
| Submarine Squadron 12 (SUBRON12) | Naval Submarine Base New London; Groton, Connecticut | SUBDEVRON 12 changed to Submarine Squadron 12 in 2016 | Prior to 1 May 1977 was designated Submarine Development Group 2 (DEVGRU2). |
| Submarine Squadron 14 (SUBRON14) | Holy Loch, Scotland | Decommissioned (1992) | Fleet Ballistic Missile (FBM) submarine squadron. Headquarters was at Submarine Base in Groton, Connecticut. Submarines were forward deployed to Holy Loch, Scotland. |
| Submarine Squadron 16 (SUBRON16) | Naval Submarine Base Kings Bay; King's Bay, Georgia | Active | |
| Submarine Squadron 20 (SUBRON20) | Naval Submarine Base Kings Bay; King's Bay, Georgia | Active | With Asiatic Fleet on December 7, 1941. |
| Submarine Squadron 22 (SUBRON22) | La Maddalena, Italy | 1972–2008 | Known as Submarine Refit and Training Group La Maddalena until the mid-1980s |

=== List of submarine groups ===
| Group name | Base | Squadrons | Status | Notes |
|---|---|---|---|---|
| Submarine Group 2 | Naval Submarine Base New London; Groton, Connecticut | DEVGRU2, DEVRON 12/SUBRON 12, SUBRONs 2, 4, 6, 8, 10, 14 | Disestablished on August 22, 2014 | Established in August 1975. Prior to mid-1970s was named Submarine Flotilla 2. Re-established on 1 October 2019. |
| Submarine Group 7 | Yokosuka, Japan | SUBRON 15 | Active | Also functions as CTF-74 under Seventh Fleet, and as CTF-54 under Fifth Fleet |
| Submarine Group 8 | Naples, Italy | | Active | Also functions as CTF-64 and CTF-69 under Sixth Fleet |
| Submarine Group 9 | Bangor, WA | DEVRON 5, SUBRONs 17 and 19 | Active | |
| Submarine Group 10 | Kings Bay, GA | SUBRONs 16 and 20 | Active | |
