= USS South Dakota (SSN-790) =

US Navy Virginia-class submarine

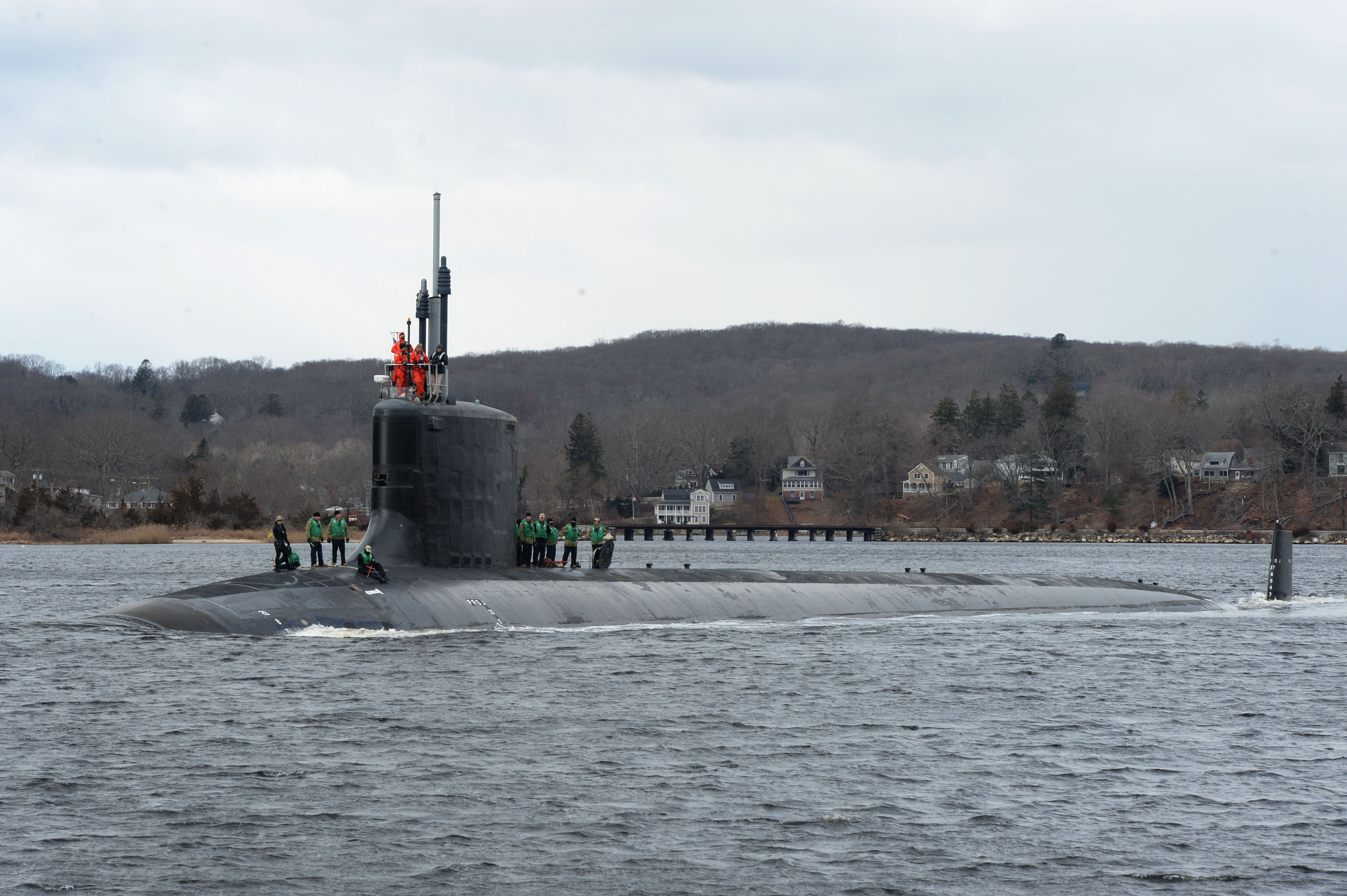
- South Dakota on 9 January 2019

History

United States
- Name: USS South Dakota
- Namesake: The state of South Dakota
- Awarded: 22 December 2008
- Builder: Electric Boat
- Laid down: 4 April 2016
- Launched: 1 February 2018
- Christened: 14 October 2017
- Acquired: 24 September 2018
- Commissioned: 2 February 2019
- Home port: Groton, Connecticut
- Identification: Hull number: SSN-790
- Motto: Subter Mare Dominamur; “Under the sea we rule”
- Status: In active service
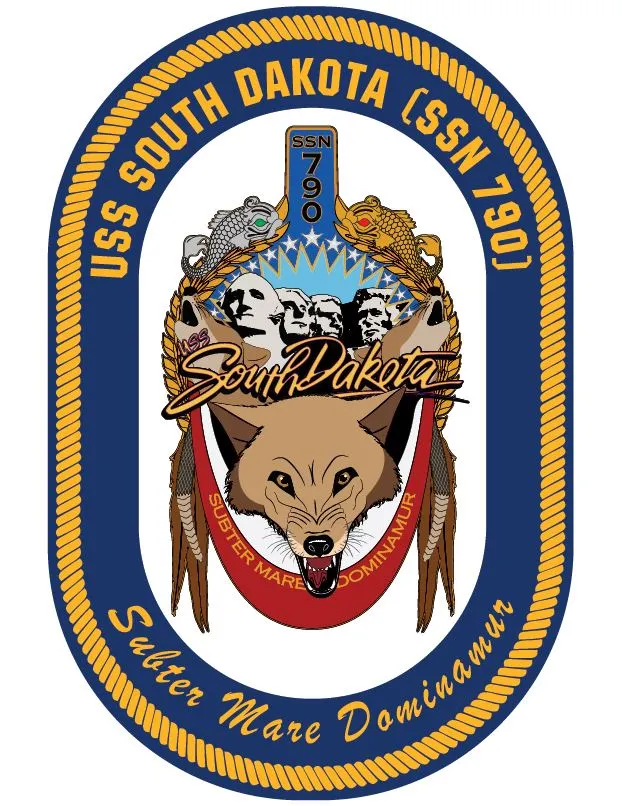
- Badge

General characteristics
- Class & type: Virginia-class submarine
- Displacement: 7800 tons light, 7800 tons full
- Length: 114.9 meters (377 feet)
- Beam: 10.3 meters (34 feet)
- Propulsion: 1 × S9G PWR nuclear reactor 280,000 shp (210 MW), HEU 93%; 2 × steam turbines 40,000 shp (30 MW); 1 × single shaft pump-jet propulsor; 1 × secondary propulsion motor
- Speed: 25 knots (46 km/h)
- Range: Essentially unlimited distance; 33 years
- Test depth: greater than 800 feet (240 meters)
- Complement: 134 officers and men

USS South Dakota (SSN-790), is a nuclear powered Virginia-class submarine in service with the United States Navy. The contract to build her was awarded to Huntington Ingalls Industries in partnership with the Electric Boat division of General Dynamics in Newport News, Virginia, on 22 December 2008. This boat is the seventh of the Block III submarines which will feature a revised bow, including some technology from Ohio-class SSGNs. The keel laying ceremony took place on 4 April 2016. The boat's sponsor is Deanie Dempsey, wife of General Martin Dempsey. Her christening ceremony took place on 14 October 2017 in Groton, Connecticut.

In October 2026 the ship's three most senior officers were removed, allegedly following a grounding incident: contrary to custom this was not reported to the US Congress.

== In popular culture ==
In 2024, Business Insider filmed a short documentary aboard the USS South Dakota showing how Navy culinary specialists prepare meals for the crew members while on board.
