= USS Arizona (SSGN-803) =

US Navy Virginia-class submarine

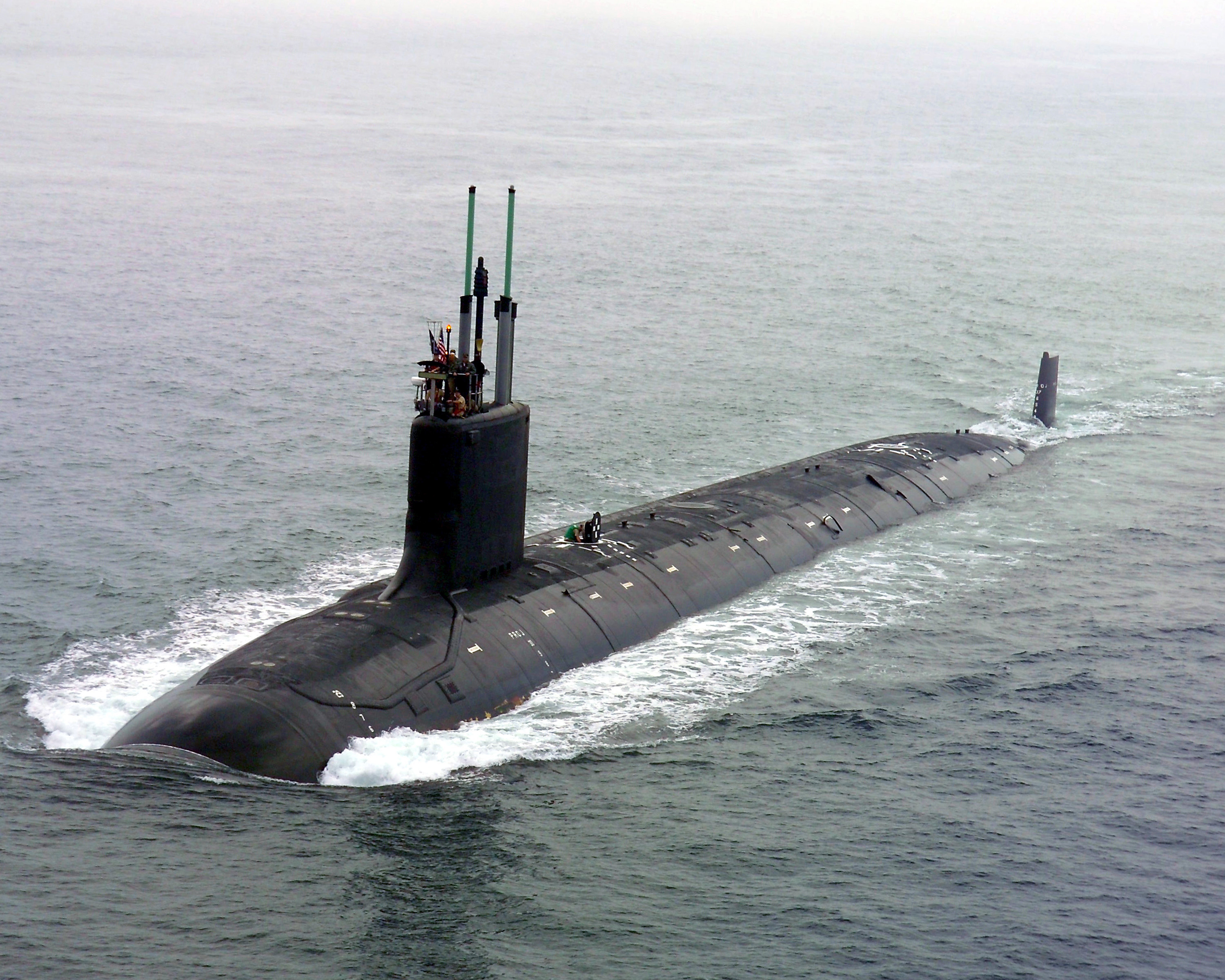
- The lead boat of the Virginia class, USS Virginia (SSN-774)

History

United States
- Name: USS Arizona
- Namesake: State of Arizona
- Ordered: 2 December 2019
- Builder: General Dynamics Electric Boat, Groton, Connecticut
- Laid down: 7 December 2022
- Identification: Hull number: SSGN-803
- Status: Under construction

General characteristics
- Class & type: Virginia-class submarine
- Displacement: 10,200 tons
- Length: 460 ft (140 m)
- Beam: 34 ft (10.4 m)
- Draft: 32 ft (9.8 m)
- Propulsion: S9G reactor auxiliary diesel engine
- Speed: 25 knots (46 km/h)
- Endurance: can remain submerged for periods in excess of 3 months
- Test depth: greater than 800 ft (244 m)
- Complement: 15 officers; 120 enlisted men
- Armament: 40 VLS tubes (12 forward VPT; 28 in VPM), four 21 inch (530 mm) torpedo tubes for Mk-48 torpedoes UGM-109 Tomahawk

Arizona (SSGN-803), a Block V Virginia-class submarine, will be the fourth United States Navy vessel named for the state of Arizona, and the first vessel to carry the name since the loss of the USS Arizona (BB-39) during the attack on Pearl Harbor on 7 December 1941, which pulled the US into World War II. Acting Secretary of the Navy Thomas Modly announced the name on 24 December 2019, in a press release. Arizona was authorized for construction on 2 December 2019. Arizona will be the second Block V boat, and the first boat to feature the Virginia Payload Module.

The keel laying ceremony took place 7 December 2022 at the Quonset Point Facility of General Dynamics Electric Boat in North Kingstown, RI. The sponsor for Arizona is Nikki Stratton, the granddaughter of Donald Stratton, a Seaman First Class aboard the battleship USS Arizona who survived the attack. He died in February 2020 at the age of 97.

On 3 August 2026, the Department of the Navy announced that all planned Virginia-class vessels with the Virginia Payload Module (VPM) will be reclassified SSGN. Arizona is the first of the 19 planned Virginia-class SSGNs.

== Design ==
Compared to Blocks I-IV of Virginia-class submarines, Block V vessels will incorporate previously introduced modifications to the base design in addition to a Virginia Payload Module (VPM). The VPM inserts a segment into the boat's hull which adds four vertical launch tubes. Each tube allows for the carrying of seven Tomahawk strike missiles, increasing her armament to a total of 40 missiles.
