= USS Idaho (SSN-799) =

US Navy Virginia-class submarine

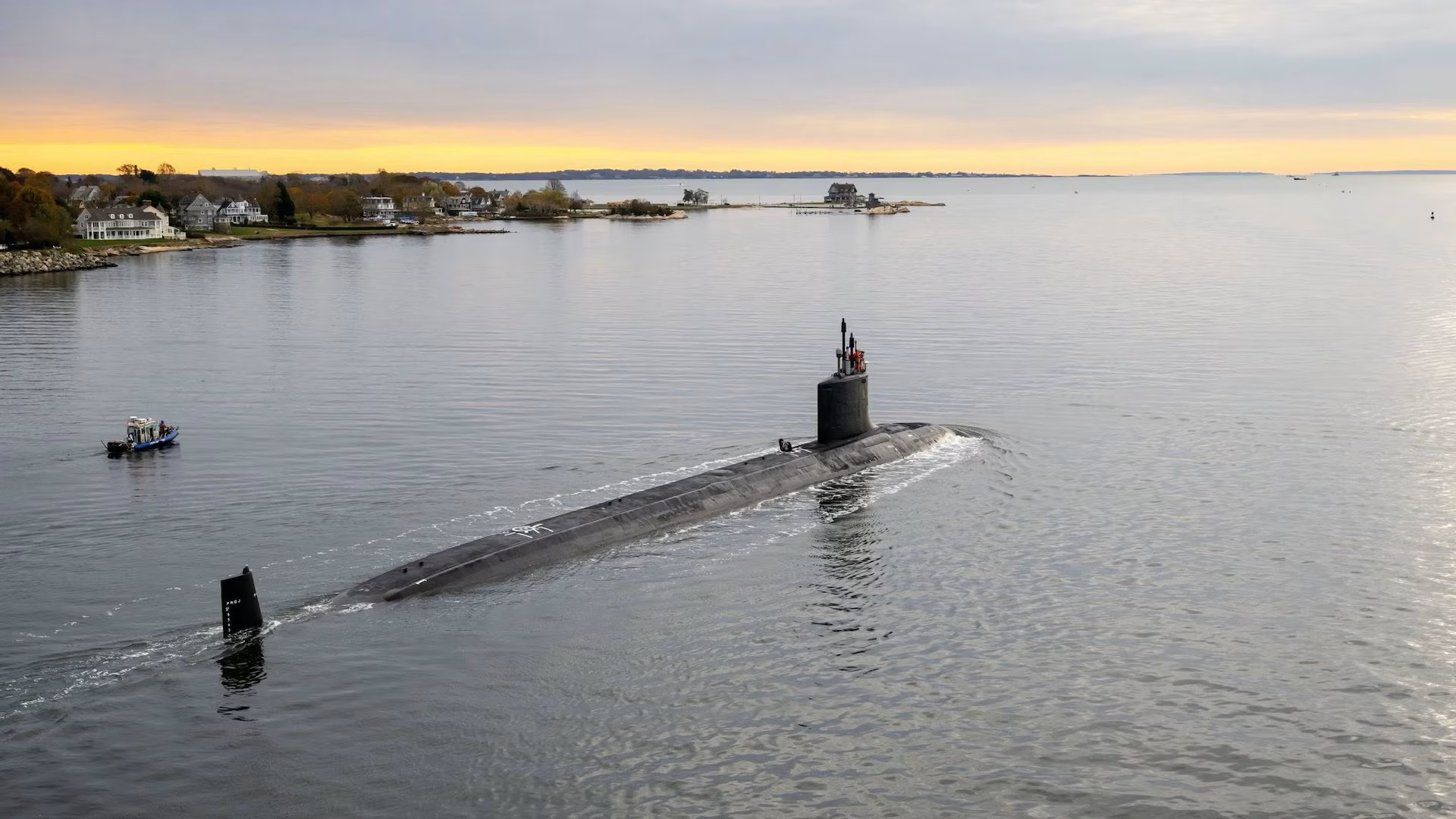
- Idaho during her sea acceptance trials, 2025

History

United States
- Name: Idaho
- Namesake: State of Idaho
- Ordered: 28 April 2014
- Builder: General Dynamics Electric Boat, Groton, Connecticut
- Laid down: 24 August 2020
- Launched: 6 August 2024
- Sponsored by: Teresa Stackley
- Christened: 16 March 2024
- Commissioned: 25 April 2026
- Home port: Groton, Connecticut
- Identification: Hull number: SSN-799
- Motto: Esto Perpetua
- Status: In active service

General characteristics
- Class & type: Virginia-class submarine
- Displacement: 7,800 tons
- Length: 377 ft (115 m)
- Beam: 34 ft (10.4 m)
- Draft: 32 ft (9.8 m)
- Propulsion: S9G reactor, auxiliary diesel engine
- Speed: 25 knots (46 km/h)
- Endurance: will be able to remain submerged for up to 3 months
- Test depth: greater than 800 ft (244 m)
- Complement: 15 officers; 120 enlisted men
- Armament: 12 VLS tubes, four 21 inch (530 mm) torpedo tubes for Mk-48 torpedoes BGM-109 Tomahawk

USS Idaho (SSN-799), a Virginia-class submarine, is the fifth U.S. Navy vessel named for the state of Idaho. Secretary of the Navy Ray Mabus announced the name on 23 August 2015, at a ceremony in Idaho. The keel laying ceremony took place 24 August 2020 at the Quonset Point Facility of General Dynamics Electric Boat in North Kingstown, Rhode Island. Idaho is projected to cost around $2.6 billion dollars and was commissioned on April 25 2026 at Naval Submarine Base New London. She was christened 16 March 2024 at Electric Boat by Teresa Stackley, wife of Sean Stackley, a former Assistant Secretary of the Navy (Research, Development and Acquisition).
