= USS Castine =

Two ships of the United States Navy have been named Castine for a town in Maine.

- USS Castine (PG-6), was a gunboat launched in 1892 and decommissioned in 1919. Lieutenant Chester Nimitz served aboard her in 1912.
- USS Castine (IX-211), was a gunboat, originally named PC-452 and reclassified Castine (IX-211) on 10 March 1945.
