= USS Utah (SSN-801) =

US Navy Virginia-class submarine

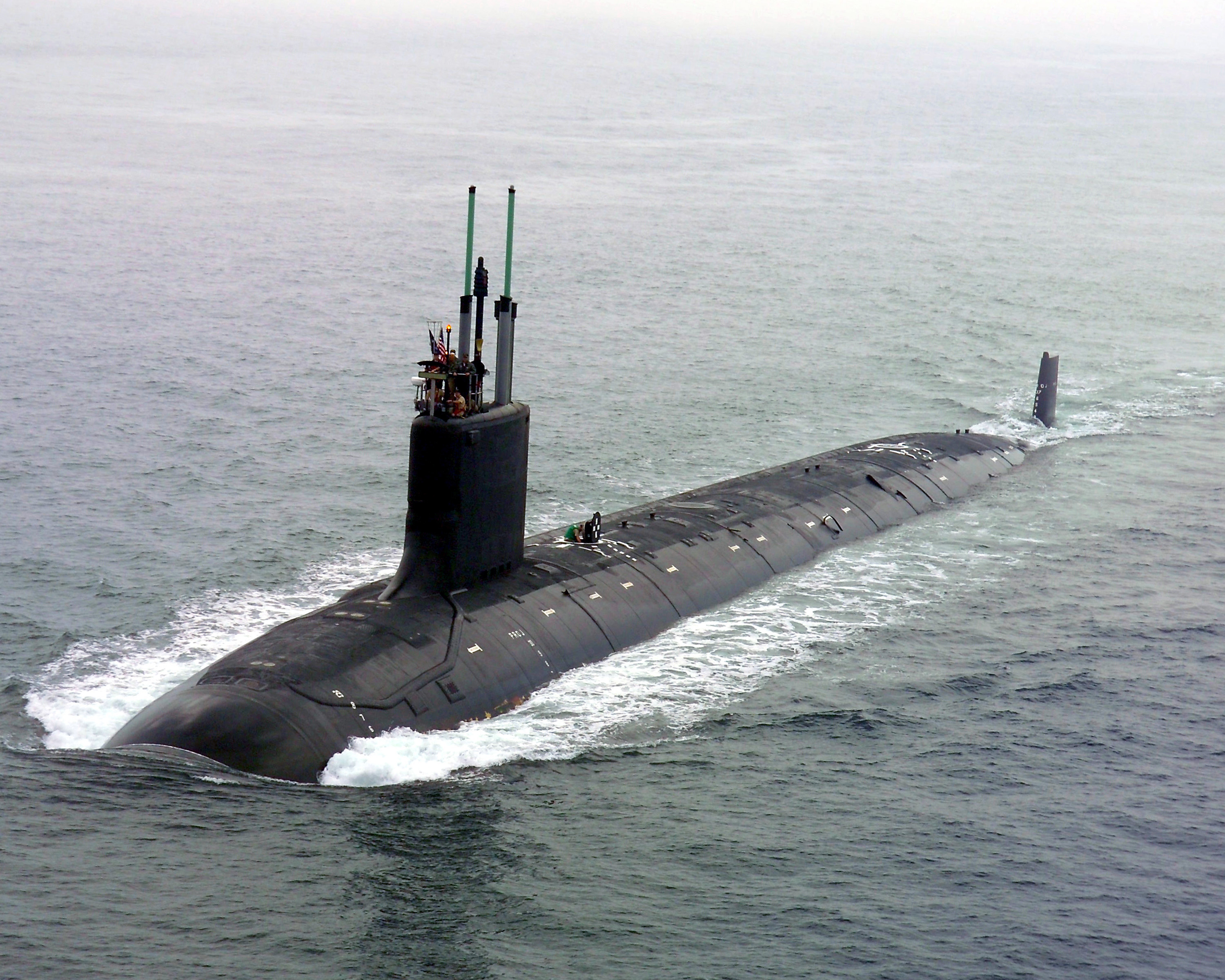
- The lead boat of the Virginia class, USS Virginia returns to the General Dynamics Electric Boat shipyard following the successful completion of its "alpha" sea trials in 2004.

History

United States
- Name: USS Utah
- Namesake: State of Utah
- Ordered: 28 April 2014
- Builder: General Dynamics Electric Boat, Groton, Connecticut
- Laid down: 1 September 2021
- Launched: 17 May 2026
- Identification: Hull number: SSN-801

General characteristics
- Class & type: Virginia-class submarine
- Displacement: 7,800 tons
- Length: 377 ft (115 m)
- Beam: 34 ft (10.4 m)
- Draft: 32 ft (9.8 m)
- Propulsion: S9G reactor auxiliary diesel engine
- Speed: 25 knots (46 km/h)
- Endurance: can remain submerged for up to 3 months
- Test depth: greater than 800 ft (244 m)
- Complement: 15 officers; 120 enlisted men
- Armament: 12 VLS tubes, four 21-inch (533 mm) torpedo tubes for Mk 48 torpedoes BGM-109 Tomahawk

Utah (SSN-801), a Virginia-class submarine, is the second U.S. Navy vessel named for the state of Utah. Secretary of the Navy Ray Mabus announced the name on September 28, 2015, at a ceremony in Salt Lake City, Utah. The Navy specifically selected boat number "801" to be named Utah, even skipping over some other as-yet-unnamed boats, as 801 is the telephone area code for Utah's capital, Salt Lake City.

The keel laying ceremony took place 1 September 2021 at the Groton Facility of General Dynamics Electric Boat in Groton, Connecticut. The ship's sponsors are Sharon Lee, wife of US Senator, Mike Lee, and Mary Kaye Huntsman, wife of former Utah governor Jon Huntsman Jr.

The Utah was christened on 25 October 2025 in Groton, Connecticut.
