= USS Iowa (SSN-797) =

US Navy Virginia-class submarine

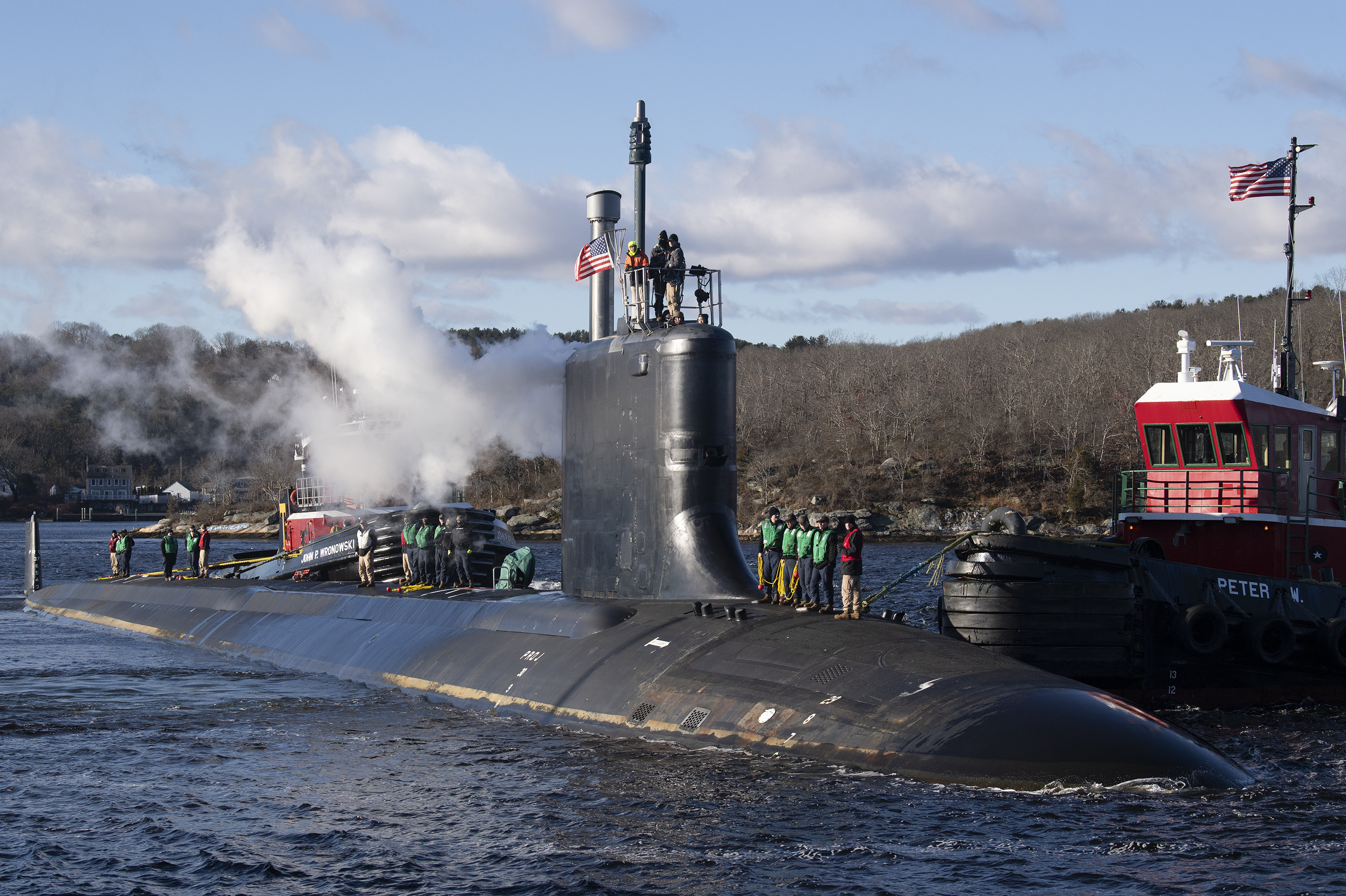
- Iowa being delivered to the US Navy in 2024

History

United States
- Name: USS Iowa
- Namesake: State of Iowa
- Ordered: 28 April 2014
- Builder: General Dynamics Electric Boat, Groton, Connecticut
- Laid down: 20 August 2019
- Sponsored by: Christie Vilsack
- Christened: 17 June 2023
- Acquired: 21 December 2024
- Commissioned: 5 April 2025
- Home port: NSB Groton, CN
- Identification: Hull number: SSN-797
- Motto: "Our Liberties We Prize, Our Rights We Will Maintain" and "Fight Iowa, Fear the Gray Ghost"
- Status: In active service

General characteristics
- Class & type: Virginia-class submarine
- Displacement: 7,800 tons
- Length: 377 ft (115 m)
- Beam: 34 ft (10.4 m)
- Draft: 32 ft (9.8 m)
- Propulsion: S9G reactor auxiliary diesel engine
- Speed: 25 knots (46 km/h; 29 mph)
- Endurance: can remain submerged for up to 3 months
- Test depth: greater than 800 ft (244 m)
- Complement: 15 officers; 120 enlisted men and women
- Armament: 12 x VLS tubes; 4 x 21-inch (530 mm) torpedo tubes for Mk-48 torpedoes; BGM-109 Tomahawk

Iowa (SSN-797), a Virginia-class submarine, is the twenty fourth submarine of the class and is the fourth U.S. Navy vessel named for the state of Iowa. Secretary of the Navy Ray Mabus officially announced the name on September 2, 2015, during a news briefing at Iowa State University.

== Construction and career ==
Iowa's keel was laid down on 20 August 2019 at the Quonset Point Facility of General Dynamics Electric Boat in North Kingstown, Rhode Island. She was christened on 17 June 2023 by Christie Vilsack, the boat's sponsor and former First lady of Iowa.

On April 5, 2025, the USS Iowa (SSN-797) was commissioned at New London Subase in Groton, Connecticut, where the ship will be home ported. (Note: For the USS Iowa commissioning crew's reception on April 3, 2025, a special beer Underway Rack Stowed, which was a cream ale made with Iowa corn, was featured as a collaboration between Iowa based Big Grove Brewery and the Groton, Connecticut, based Outer Light Brewing Company located at 266 Bridge Street in Groton with Des Moines based Big Moe Cason, who is a U.S. Navy veteran that served aboard the USS Missouri (BB-63), which is sister ship of the USS Iowa (BB-61), providing the BBQ.)
