= USS Tang (SSGN-805) =

US Navy Virginia-class submarine

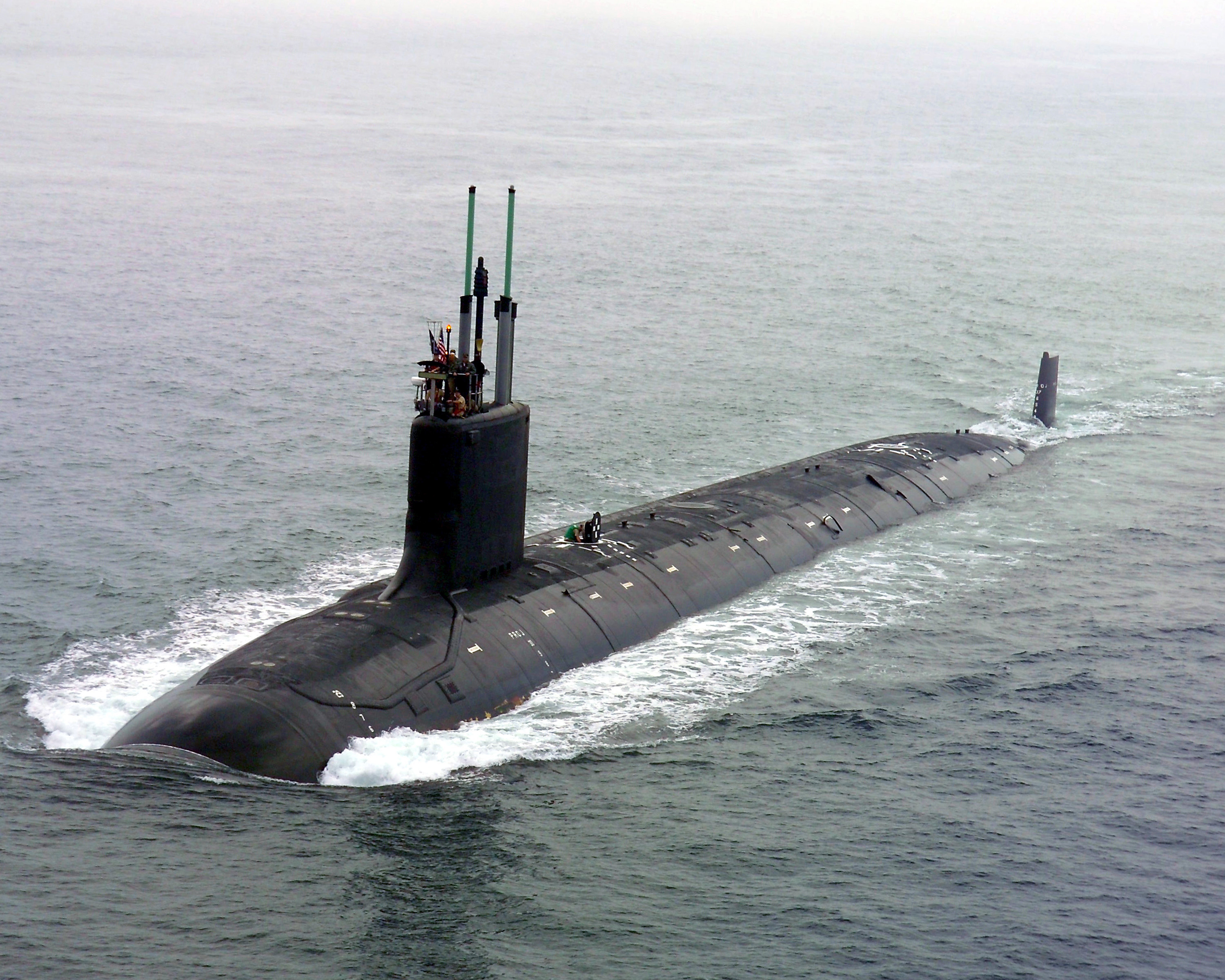
- The lead boat of the Virginia class, USS Virginia (SSN-774).

History

United States
- Name: Tang
- Namesake: USS Tang (SS-306)
- Ordered: 2 December 2019
- Builder: General Dynamics Electric Boat, Groton, Connecticut
- Laid down: 17 August 2023
- Sponsored by: Mimi Donnelly
- Status: Under construction

General characteristics
- Class & type: Virginia-class submarine
- Displacement: 10,200 tons
- Length: 460 ft (140 m)
- Beam: 34 ft (10.4 m)
- Draft: 32 ft (9.8 m)
- Propulsion: S9G reactor auxiliary diesel engine
- Speed: 25 knots (46 km/h)
- Endurance: can remain submerged for periods in excess of 3 months
- Test depth: greater than 800 ft (244 m)
- Complement: 15 officers; 120 enlisted men
- Armament: 40 VLS tubes (12 forward VPT; 28 in VPM), four 21 inch (530 mm) torpedo tubes for Mk-48 torpedoes BGM-109 Tomahawk

USS Tang (SSGN-805) will be a nuclear-powered, Virginia-class attack submarine in the United States Navy. She will also be third United States Navy vessel with the name tang, a large family of tropical fish. Secretary of the Navy Kenneth Braithwaite announced in a 17 November 2020 press release that the submarine will be named USS Tang, in honor of a storied WWII submarine. This is the second of four new Virginia class members named in honor of WWII submarines with very successful combat records. Ordered on 2 December 2019, she is the fourth of the Block V boats, the first boats of the class to include the Virginia Payload Module.

The keel laying ceremony for the submarine took place 17 August 2023 at the Quonset Point Facility of General Dynamics Electric Boat in North Kingstown, Rhode Island and the sponsor is Mimi Donnelly, wife of the retired American submarine officer Vice Admiral John J. Donnelly.

== Design ==
Compared to Blocks I-IV of Virginia-class submarines, Block V vessels will incorporate previously introduced modifications to the base design in addition to a Virginia Payload Module (VPM). The VPM inserts a segment into the boat's hull which adds four vertical launch tubes. Each tube allows for the carrying of seven Tomahawk strike missiles, increasing her armament to a total of 40 missiles.
