= Virginia (disambiguation) =

Virginia is a state in the United States of America.

Virginia most often also refers to:

- West Virginia, another U.S. state
- Virginia (given name)

Virginia may also refer to:

== Places ==
=== Australia ===
- Virginia, Queensland
- Virginia, South Australia

=== Brazil ===
- Virgínia

=== Canada ===
- Virginia, Ontario

=== Colombia ===
- La Virginia

=== Honduras ===
- Virginia, Lempira

=== Ireland ===
- Virginia, County Cavan, a town

=== Liberia ===
- Virginia, Liberia

=== South Africa ===
- Virginia, Free State
  - Virginia (House of Assembly of South Africa constituency)

=== United States ===
- Virginia, California
- Virginia, Idaho
- Virginia, Illinois
- Virginia, Minnesota
- Virginia, Missouri
- Virginia, Nebraska
- Colony of Virginia, prior to American independence
- Virginias, Virginia and West Virginia

== Film ==
- Virginia (1941 film)
- Virginia (2010 film)

== Literature ==
- Virginia (play), a 1754 tragedy by Samuel Crisp
- Virginia (novel), a novel by Ellen Glasgow
- "Virginia" (poem), a poem by Thomas Babington Macaulay

== Music ==
- "Virginia", a song by Tori Amos from Scarlet's Walk
- "Virginia", a song by Gin Blossoms from Congratulations I'm Sorry
- "Virginia (Touch Me Like You Do)", a song by Bill Amesbury (now known as Barbra Amesbury) that peaked at #59 on the Billboard Hot 100 chart on April 6, 1974

== Opera ==
- Virginia (Mercadante)
- Virginia (Montero)
- Virginia (operetta), a 1937 operetta by Arthur Schwartz

== Ships ==
- Virginia (pinnace), or Virginia of Sagadahoc, a pinnace built in 1607–08
- Virginia (schooner), a wooden replica schooner launched in 2005
- CSS Virginia, a Confederate States Navy ironclad
- HMS Virginia, a 32-gun frigate
- SS Brazil, a passenger steamship launched as SS Virginia
- USRC Virginia (1791), a Revenue Service cutter in service from 1791–1798
- USRC Virginia (1797), a Revenue Service cutter in service from 1798–1807
- USS Virginia (1776), a 28-gun sailing frigate built in 1776, captured by the British and recommissioned as HMS Virginia
- USS Virginia (1797), a 14-gun revenue cutter built in 1797
- USS Virginia (1825), a 74-gun ship of the line laid down in 1818 but never launched
- USS Virginia (1861), a captured Spanish blockade runner during the American Civil War
- USS Virginia (BB-13), a Virginia-class battleship commissioned in 1906
- USS Virginia (SP-274), a yacht purchased by the Navy that patrolled Lake Michigan during World War I
- USS Virginia (SP-746), a motorboat acquired by the Navy that patrolled the east coast during World War I
- USS Virginia (SP-1965), a two-masted auxiliary schooner acquired by the Navy that patrolled the east coast during World War I
- USS Virginia (CGN-38), a Virginia-class cruiser commissioned in 1976
- USS Virginia (SSN-774), a Virginia-class submarine commissioned in 2004

== Other uses ==
- Virginia (snake), a genus of snake
- Virginia Airport, an airport in Durban, South Africa
- Virginia creeper, a plant in the grape family, Vitaceae
- Virginia (tobacco)
- Virginia (video game)
- Virginia (VTA), a light rail station in San Jose, California
- The Virginia, an apartment building in Richmond, Virginia
- University of Virginia
  - Virginia Cavaliers, the university's athletic teams
- Virginia Agricultural Show, annual event in Ireland
- Vickers Virginia, a British bomber aircraft
- 50 Virginia, an asteroid

== See also ==
- East Virginia (disambiguation)
- Typhoon Virginia (disambiguation)
- Verginia
- Virginia (ship), a list of ships named "Virginia"
- Virginia Park (disambiguation)
- Virginia Water, a village in Surrey, England, UK
- Virginia Water Lake, in the borough of Runnymede in Surrey
- Virginian (disambiguation)
- Virginie (disambiguation)
- West Virginia (disambiguation)
- Virginia Peak (disambiguation)
