= USS Virginia =

USS Virginia may refer to:

- USS Virginia (1776), was a 28-gun sailing frigate built in 1776, captured by the British in the following year and recommissioned as HMS Virginia
- USS Virginia (1797), was a 14-gun revenue cutter built in 1797 and returned to the Revenue Cutter Service in 1801
- USS Virginia (1825), was a 74-gun ship of the line laid down in 1818 but never launched, and broken up on the stocks in 1874
- USS Virginia (1861), was a captured Spanish blockade runner during the American Civil War and commissioned into the United States Navy
- USS Virginia (BB-13), was a Virginia-class battleship commissioned in 1906, decommissioned in 1920, and destroyed in 1923 as a bombing target
- USS Virginia (SP-274), was a yacht purchased by the Navy and officially referred to only as SP-274, patrolled Lake Michigan during World War I
- USS Virginia (SP-746), was a motorboat acquired by the Navy and officially referred to only as SP-746, patrolled the east coast during World War I
- USS Virginia (SP-1965), was a two-masted auxiliary schooner acquired by the Navy and officially referred to only as SP-1965, patrolled the east coast during World War I
- USS Virginia (CGN-38), was a Virginia-class cruiser commissioned in 1976 and decommissioned in 1994
- USS Virginia (SSN-774), is a Virginia-class submarine commissioned in 2004

== See also ==
- Virginia (ship)
  - CSS Virginia was the first Confederate ironclad, built using the hull of the captured USS Merrimack
    - USS Merrimack (1855), the ship that CSS Virginia was built upon
  - CSS Virginia II, an ironclad ram.
  - USRC Virginia for ships of the US Revenue Cutter Service
- USS Virginian
- USS West Virginia
- Virginia (disambiguation)
