= Virginian (ship) =

Virginian has been the name of several ships:

- USS Virginian
  - USS Virginian (1904), a tug in commission from 1918 to 1919
  - USS Virginian (ID-3920), a troop transport in commission in 1919
- RMS Virginian, a steam turbine powered transatlantic ocean liner, launched in 1904 for the Allan Line. She operated from 1920 to 1948 for the Swedish American Line as SS Drottningholm.

== See also ==
- Virginian (disambiguation)
- Virginia (ship)
