= Virginia Class =

Virginia class may refer to three classes of warship;

- Virginia-class battleship, a class of pre-Dreadnought battleships
- Virginia-class cruiser, a class of nuclear-powered cruisers built during the Cold War
- Virginia-class submarine, a 21st-century class of nuclear-powered attack submarines

== See also ==
- Virginia (disambiguation)
- Class (disambiguation)
