= Virginia (ship) =

Virginia is the name of several ships:

- Virginia (pinnace) or Virginia of Sagadahoc, a pinnace built in 1607-08 by colonists at the Popham Colony
- Virginia (schooner), a wooden replica schooner launched in 2005
- HMS Virginia, a 32-gun frigate
- USS Virginia, many ships by the name
- USRC Virginia, many ships of the US Revenue Cutter Service
- CSS Virginia was the first Confederate States Navy ironclad, built using the hull of the captured USS Merrimack
- CSS Virginia II, an ironclad ram.
- SS Virginia, an Austro-Hungarian steamship launched in 1903, renamed Kerlew and then acquired by the US Navy and named USS Kerlew
- SS Brazil, a passenger steamship launched as SS Virginia, renamed in 1938

== See also ==
- Virginia (disambiguation)
- Virginian (ship)
- USS West Virginia
