= David Kern =

David Kern may refer to:

- David J. Kern, U.S. Navy officer
- David Morris Kern (1909–2013), American pharmacist and businessman
