= Richmond Virginians (disambiguation) =

The Richmond Virginians were a AAA baseball team from 1954 to 1964.

Richmond Virginians may also refer to:

- Richmond Virginians (1884), major league baseball team
- Richmond Virginians (chorus), barbershop chorus
- People from Richmond, Virginia
- People from Richmond County, Virginia

== See also ==
- Virginian (disambiguation)
- Richmond (disambiguation)
