= USRC Virginia =

USRC Virginia may refer to the following ships of the United States Revenue Service:

- USRC Virginia (1791), was one of the first ten Revenue Service cutters in service from 1791 to 1798
- USRC Virginia (1797), was a Revenue Service cutter in service from 1798 to 1807

== See also ==
- USS Virginia for ships of the US Navy

== Note ==
- Ships of the US Revenue Cutter Service were often placed under the authority of the US Navy during times of war.
