= USS Virginian =

USS Virginian has been the name of more than one United States Navy ship, and may refer to:

- USS Virginian (1904), a tugboat in commission from 1918 to 1919
- USS Virginian (ID-3920), a troop transport in commission in 1919

== See also ==
- Virginian (ship)
- Virginian (disambiguation)
- USS Virginia
