= East Virginia =

East Virginia or Eastern Virginia may refer to:

- the Eastern part of Virginia, very roughly comprising the Tidewater (region) of Virginia
- A rarely used term for Virginia to distinguish it from West Virginia
- East Virginia (song), a traditional song first recorded as "East Virginia Blues" by the Carter Family and popular bluegrass standard
- the Eastern Shore of Virginia
- Eastern District of Virginia
- a fictional location in the comic strip Shoe
- a fictional location containing Grantville, which used various names

== See also ==
- Virginia (disambiguation)
- West Virginia (disambiguation)
