= USS Eagle (1798) =

Schooner

History

United States
- Name: USS Eagle
- Cost: $32,200
- Launched: 1798
- Acquired: July 1798
- Commissioned: 5 July 1798 in the U.S. Revenue-Marine. Transferred officially to U.S. Navy 20 May, 1799
- Fate: Sold, 17 June 1801

General characteristics
- Type: Schooner
- Displacement: 187 long tons (190 t)
- Length: 58 ft (18 m)
- Beam: 20 ft (6.1 m)
- Draft: 9 ft (2.7 m)
- Propulsion: Sail
- Complement: 70 officers and enlisted
- Armament: • 14 × 6-pounder guns

The first USS Eagle, a schooner, was built at Philadelphia, Pennsylvania, in 1798, and commissioned in the Revenue-Marine under the command of Captain Hugh G. Campbell, USRM.

== Quasi War ==
She placed under control of the Navy in July 1798 for service in the undeclared naval war (Quasi-War) with France.

From October 1798 Eagle patrolled off the coast of South Carolina and Georgia protecting American shipping from French privateers. Ordered to the West Indies, she arrived at Prince Rupert's Bay, Dominica, 14 March 1799, to hunt French ships, and to convoy merchant vessels on the Guadeloupe Station until late in June, when she sailed for New Castle, Delaware. Sometime in early 1799 she and USRC Diligence captured French ship Reynard. On 5 April, 1799 she captured French privateer sloop Bon Pere which was taken into the Revenue-Marine as USRM Bee. In late April or before 6 May 1799, Eagle, USS Richmond and USRC Virginia captured the French ship Louis.

In a letter dated 20 May, 1799 Navy Secretary Benjamin Stoddert notified the Treasury Secretary that he should consider Eagle to be officially transferred to the U.S. Navy.

Sometime just before 11 June, 1799 she and USS Baltimore captured a prize, probably French ship "Siren".

On 27 July 1799 the Secretary of the Navy sent a letter with Campbell's commission as a U.S. Navy officer, rank of master commandant.

She returned to the Caribbean in August 1799 for similar duty. In early November she recaptured a brig that was being towed by a privateer, the privateer was forced ashore but got off and got away. She later captured a French sloop, and with USS Ganges captured a French Letter of Marque. In December recaptured brig "George". In February she recaptured schooner "Benevolence". In March she recaptured schooner "Three Friends". In April she captured schooner "Favorite". On 2 May, 1800 captured French schooner "La Magdelaine" (15 tons). On 25 June, captured French merchantman "Dolphin". On 10 September 1800 she set sail for St. Thomas, Virgin Islands, with the sloop-of-war USS Maryland, escorting a convoy of 52 ships. On unknown date she and USS Maryland recaptured brig "Mahitable". After arrival at New Castle on 28 September, Eagle proceeded to Philadelphia and was laid up for repairs. On 19 November 1800 Lt. Tho. Calvert was ordered to take command of her. On 8 December 1800 Lt. M. Simmones Bunbury was ordered to take command. Eagle's third cruise to the West Indies extended from January to June 1801, when she returned to Baltimore.

During her career in the United States Navy, she captured or assisted in the capture of 22 French vessels which had been preying on American ocean commerce. Eagle was sold 17 June 1801 at Baltimore for $10,585.73.
