= Tom Liesegang =

American artist (born 1955)

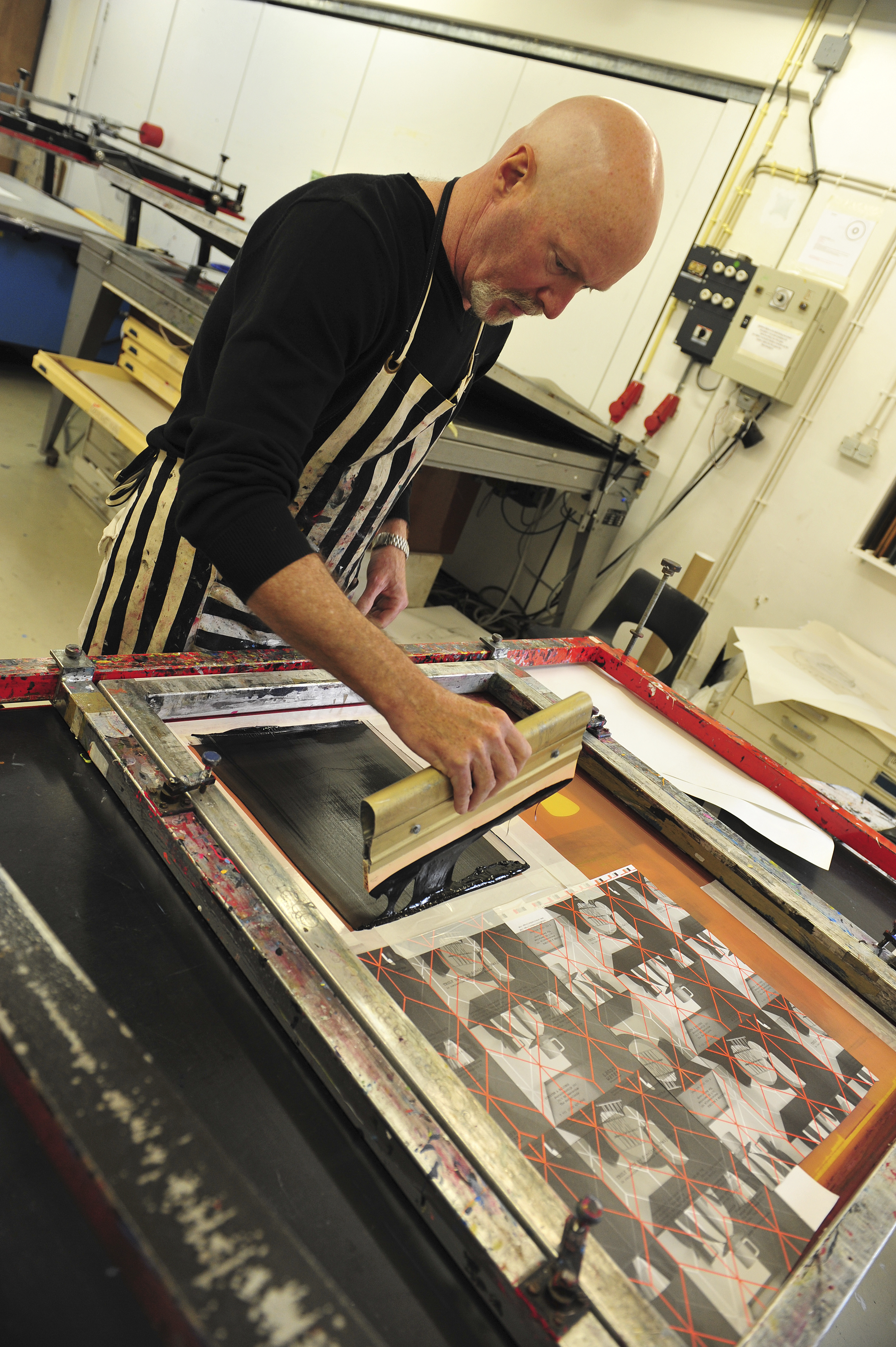
- Screen-printing process
- Born: May 24, 1955 (age 71); Boston, Massachusetts
- Occupations: Printmaking, painting
- Years active: 1980–present
- Website: www.tomliesegang.com

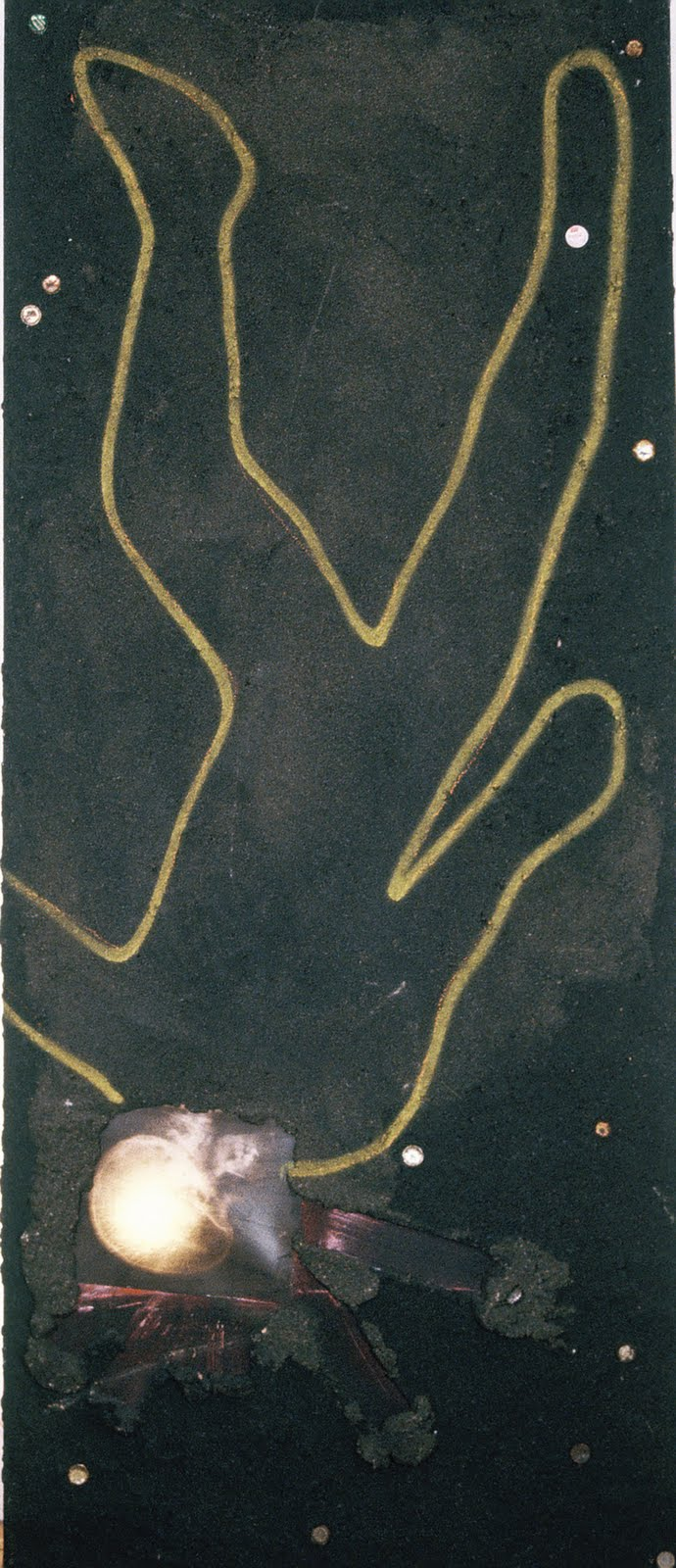
Shallow Grave

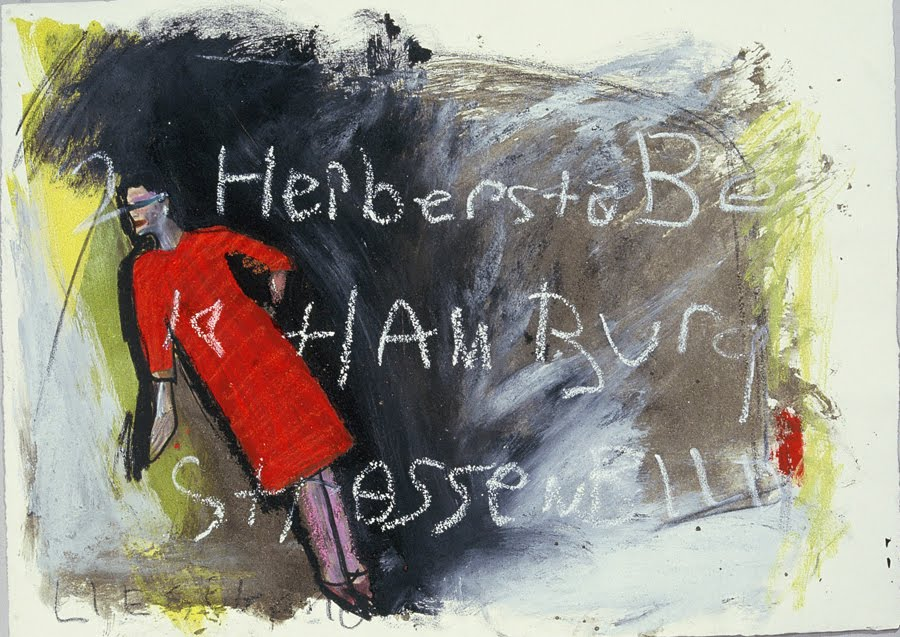
Herbertstrasse

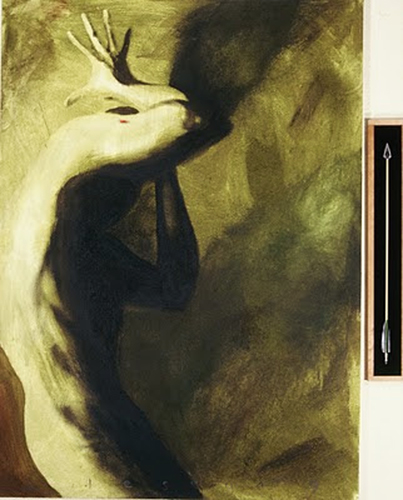
St. Sebastian

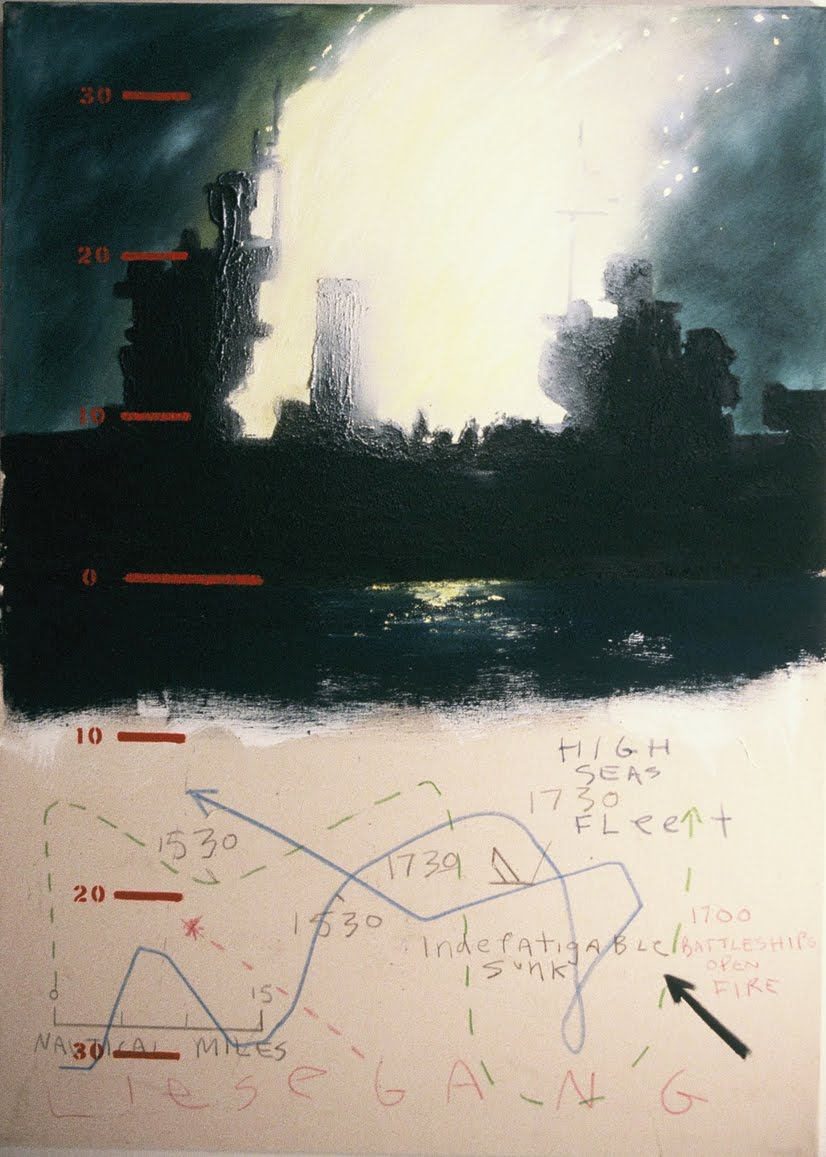
Indefatagable

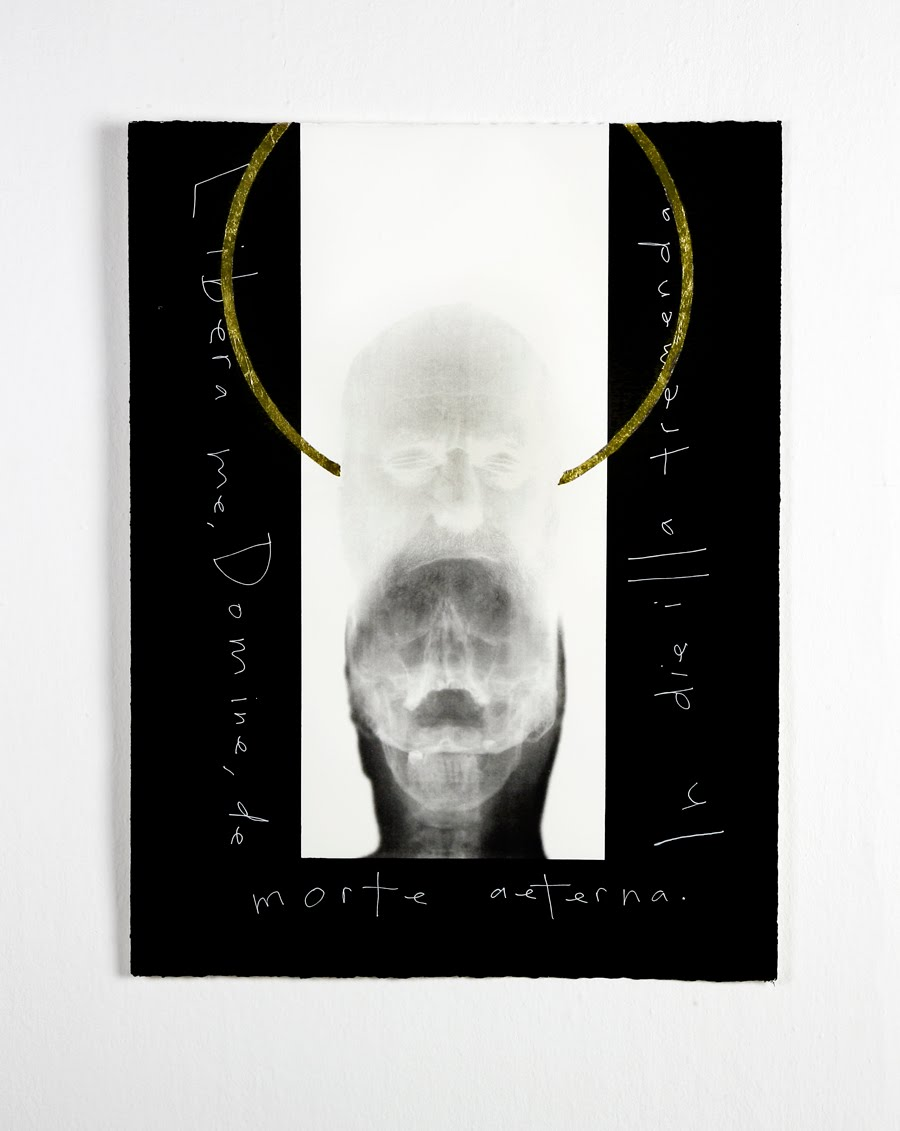
Last Rites

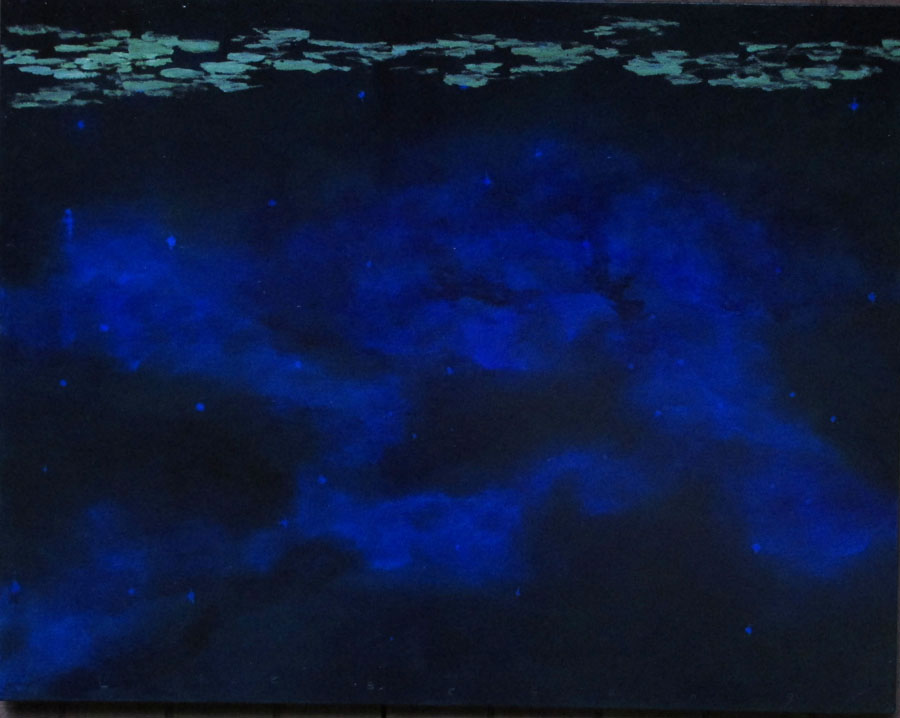
Composition in Night and Blue

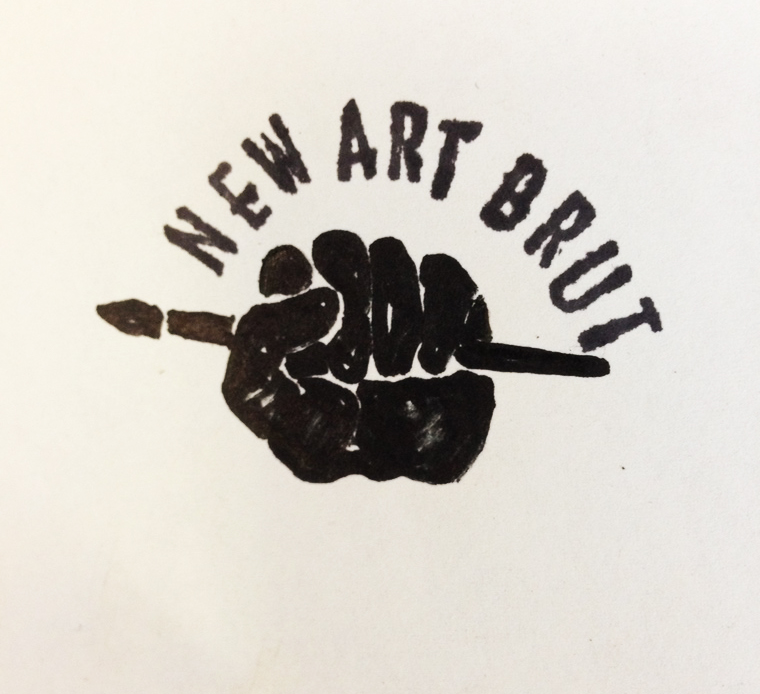
'Logo for New Art Brut, Inc.'

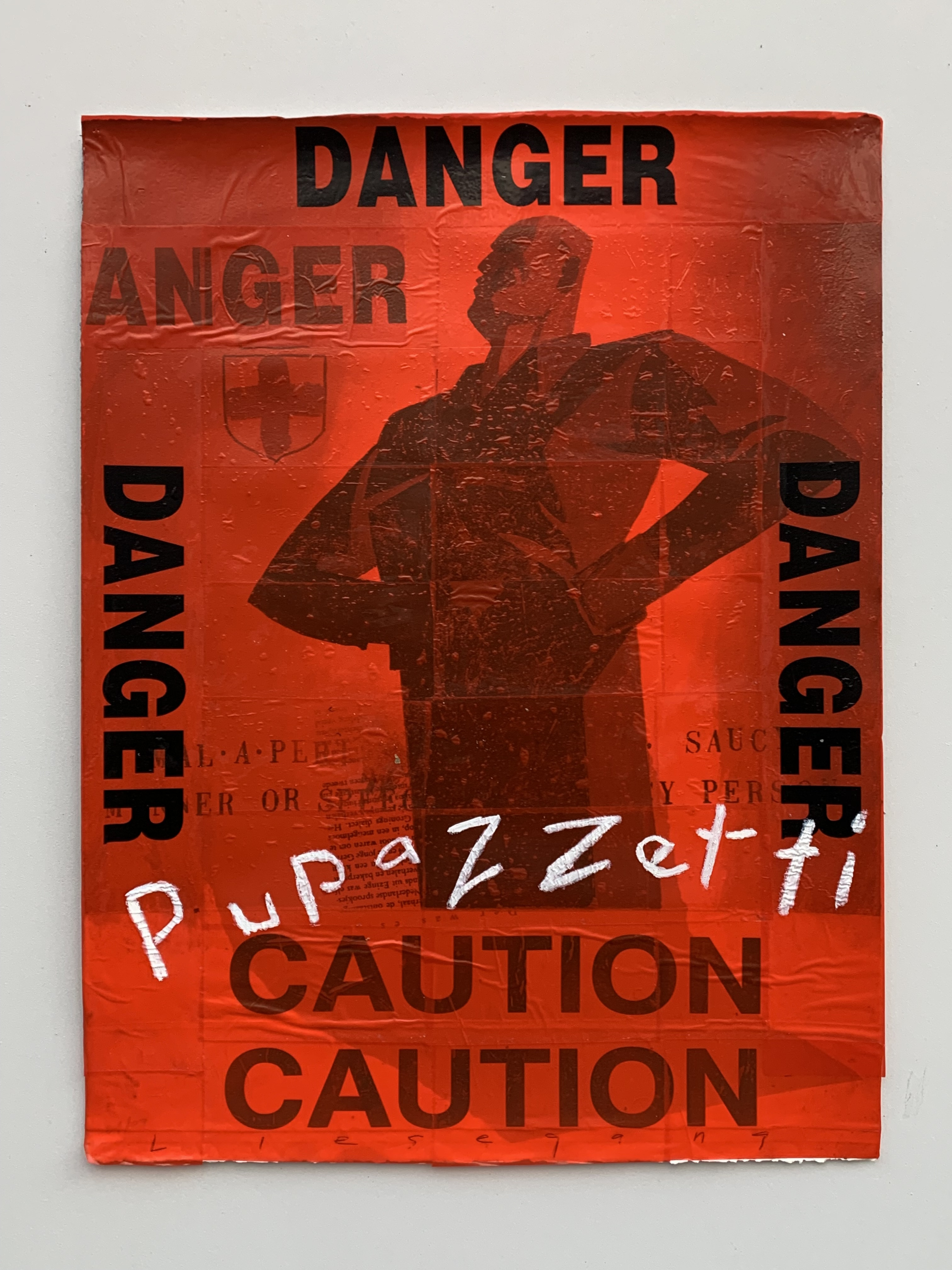
'Pupazzetti Series'

Tom Liesegang (Thomas Kirby von Richter Liesegang, born May 24, 1955) is an American artist who has lived and worked in Boston, New York and Los Angeles, as well as Amsterdam, Netherlands. His art is held in many public and private collections throughout the world.

== Career and development ==
Inspired by Michelangelo's Pietà at the 1964 New York World's Fair, Liesegang knew at nine years of age that he wanted to become an artist. Upon graduation from high school, Liesegang supported himself with his composition skills as a window decorator for a chain of woman's fashion stores throughout New England.

After a brief sojourn to Los Angeles in 1977–1978, Liesegang returned to Boston to begin his art career. With no formal training beyond private painting lessons at age 12, exhibition of his work began in 1980 and continued into the 1990s. In 1992, Liesegang relocated to New York City, switched from acrylic to oil painting and explored the diptych narrative format. In the aftermath of 9/11, Liesegang moved to Amsterdam where he began his foray into printmaking. Tombstone rubbings, often taken from the floors of some of Europe's oldest cathedrals and transferred into the screen printing process, inspired the artist to also incorporate the visual structure of illuminated manuscripts into his print work.

While in Amsterdam, Liesegang and film-maker Catharina Ooijens created Orka Fine Arts in 2004. The two created a documentary film concerning the Nazi confiscation of the Dutch International Archive for Woman. The film, titled Private Possession, is in the permanent archives at the Hague.

Liesegang's subsequent works involve commemorative printmaking for marine vessels. The first being a limited ten-print commission from the United States Navy for the USS Virginia submarine. The print includes an image of the USS Virginia's sea-trials, incorporated with design drawings of the first ironclad fighting ship, the CSS Virginia, obtained from the archives at the Maritime Museum in Newport, Virginia. Prints were awarded to key contractors and sponsors, including Senator John Warner, Admiral Edmund Giambastiani and Lynda Bird Johnson Robb, the daughter of President Lyndon Johnson.

In addition to printmaking on paper, Liesegang developed a method to use aluminum as his canvas; this allowed the ship's commemorative art to be made from the shipbuilder's materials and then framed with the identical woodwork that was used on the ship's interior. Printmaking is a tradition in the Netherlands, with Rembrandt being a notable contributor to the medium.

Since 2013, Liesegang has been back in the United States and now divides his time between his painting studio in central Massachusetts and his involvement with the Amsterdams Grafisch Atelier (AGA LAB) art studio in Amsterdam.

== Select list of collections holding Tom Liesegang's work ==
Liesegang's work is held in the public collections of:

- The Rose Museum at Brandeis University
- The Boston Public Library Archive of Prints and Drawings
- National Archives (Den Haag, NE)
- The Museum of Fine Arts (Boston)
- Worcester Museum (Worcester, MA)
- Navy Art Collection (Wash. DC)
- DeCordova Museum and Sculpture Park (Lincoln, MA)
- Gemeentearchief, (Amsterdam, NL)
- Rutger's University Print Archive (NJ)
- Vatican Library Print Archive (Rome, IT)
- Prudential Insurance Company of America (NJ)
- Pricewaterhouse Coopers
- Navy League of USA (Hampton Roads, VA)
- General Dynamics Electric Boat (Groton, CT)
- Northrop Grumman (Newport News, VA)
- Damen Shipyards Group (Gorinchem, NL)
- Heesen Yachts (Oss, NL)
- Lockheed Martin (Bethesda, MD)
- General Dynamics Electric Boat (Groton, CT)
- Rutgers University Print Archive (NJ)
- Coopers and Lybrand International Accountants
- Goodwin, Procter and Hoar, Attorneys at Law (Boston, MA)
- Calamarino and Sohns, Attorneys at Law (New York, NY)
- Wytock and Roland Industries (Providence, RI)
- Office of Senator John Warner (Washington, DC)
- Hajenius (Amsterdam, NL)
- Gemeentearchief (Amsterdam, NL)
- M Contemporary (New Orleans, LA)
- National Oceanic and Atmospheric Administration (Washington, DC)

== Reviews ==
Humor is absent from Tom Liesegang's portraits of Christian martyrs, also a favorite subject of 17th century Baroque artists commissioned by the Catholic Church. Liesegang invokes the Berniniesque strategy of depicting (and thuse engaging the viewer in) the horrific moment of martyrdom. In the triptych "The Martyrdom of Margaret Clitherow," as 16th-century English woman crushed to death by judicial order, Liesegan accompanies paintings of a woman's bound foot and hand with a real brass weight – a material reminder of the contemporary world similarly weighted by torture and injustice.

— Shawn Hill, "Contemporary 'materials' are used to explore basic (sexual) dichotomies in two current shows", The Boston Globe, April 30, 1992

The paintings themselves take many different forms. Liesegang tends to work in series, fleshing a challenge out to its logical conclusion. [...] Street paintings convincingly simulate the look and feel of asphalt. Cave paintings capture the claustrophobic majesty of ancient peoples and hieroglyphics. A series on streetwalkers is appropriately decadent, and a series of X-Ray paintings shows that Liesegang has given thought to new modes.

— Isak Rocco, "Liesegang Straight Paint", FAD Magazine, January 1989, pp. 38–39

If you look a little more closely at the print, you’ll also see a colorful map, to the right. It depicts part of the southern coast of Holland, not far from where Heesen’s facilities are located. Liesegang likes to incorporate additional elements that have a personal point of reference for the owner. Whether it’s something like this, or even the homeport of the yacht, Liesegang believes it’s essential, so that the piece is truly custom and unlike any other. Even the custom frames for his prints have a personal connection. 4You’s print frame isn’t shown here, but it’s made of the same wood that adorns her interior.
So how does Liesegang create these works of art? Through a chemical process and sanding that allow him to etch the aluminum. He also works closely with the shipyard’s management team and the naval architects to select and interpret the architectural drawings, then the cabinetry shop for the frame.

— Diane M. Byrne, "Tom Liesegang, Metal Master", MegaYacht News, October 11, 2010

As his art evolved, Liesegang found himself returning to themes that had inspired him as a twelve year old working class kid in Boston: drawings and paintings of clipper ships, sea battles and other maritime themes but with a twist born out of the inspiration of 1960s cover art for ship model kits and wartime propaganda posters. Periscope views became one of Liesegang's signature themes, which has been instrumental in redefining maritime art for the 21st century.

— Staff Writer, "Orka Fine Arts", SuperYacht Industry, Volume 5, Issue 1, 2010, pp. 36–39

Liesegang finds inspiration in rudimentary markings like these, from sidewalk drawings to scratches on benches or trees. In them he sees a human desire to be acknowledged, to leave a permanent trace on earthly surfaces. In his most recent work, canvases are constructed as an illusion of stone or concrete, and then transformed into palimpsests: language has been effaced, written over, but not fully erased.

— Kate Meadows, "Scratching The Surface Making A Mark", 86 Logic, Issue 9 (Spring 2023), pp. 42–50
