= Virginia Peak =

Virginia Peak may refer to:

- Virginia Peak (Alaska)
- Virginia Peak (Nevada)
- Virginia Peak (Wyoming)
- Virginia Peak (Yosemite)
