= The Virginian =

The Virginian(s) may refer to:

== The Virginian by Owen Wister ==
- The Virginian (novel), a 1902 novel by Owen Wister

=== Adaptations ===
- The Virginian (play), a 1903 stage play
- The Virginian (1914 film), a silent film directed by Cecil B. DeMille and starring Dustin Farnum
- The Virginian (1923 film), a silent film directed by Tom Forman and starring Kenneth Harlan
- The Virginian (1929 film), directed by Victor Fleming and starring Gary Cooper
- The Virginian (1946 film), directed by Stuart Gilmore and starring Joel McCrea
- The Virginian (TV series), a 1962–1971 American series
- The Virginian, a 2000 TV film directed by and starring Bill Pullman
- The Virginian, a 2014 Canadian straight-to-video release starring Trace Adkins

== Other uses ==
- The Virginian (album), a 1997 album by Neko Case and Her Boyfriends
- The Virginians, an 1857–1859 novel by William Makepeace Thackeray

== See also ==
- Virginian (disambiguation)
