= George W. Davis Jr. =

United States Navy officer (1933–2024)

George Wilmot Davis Jr.
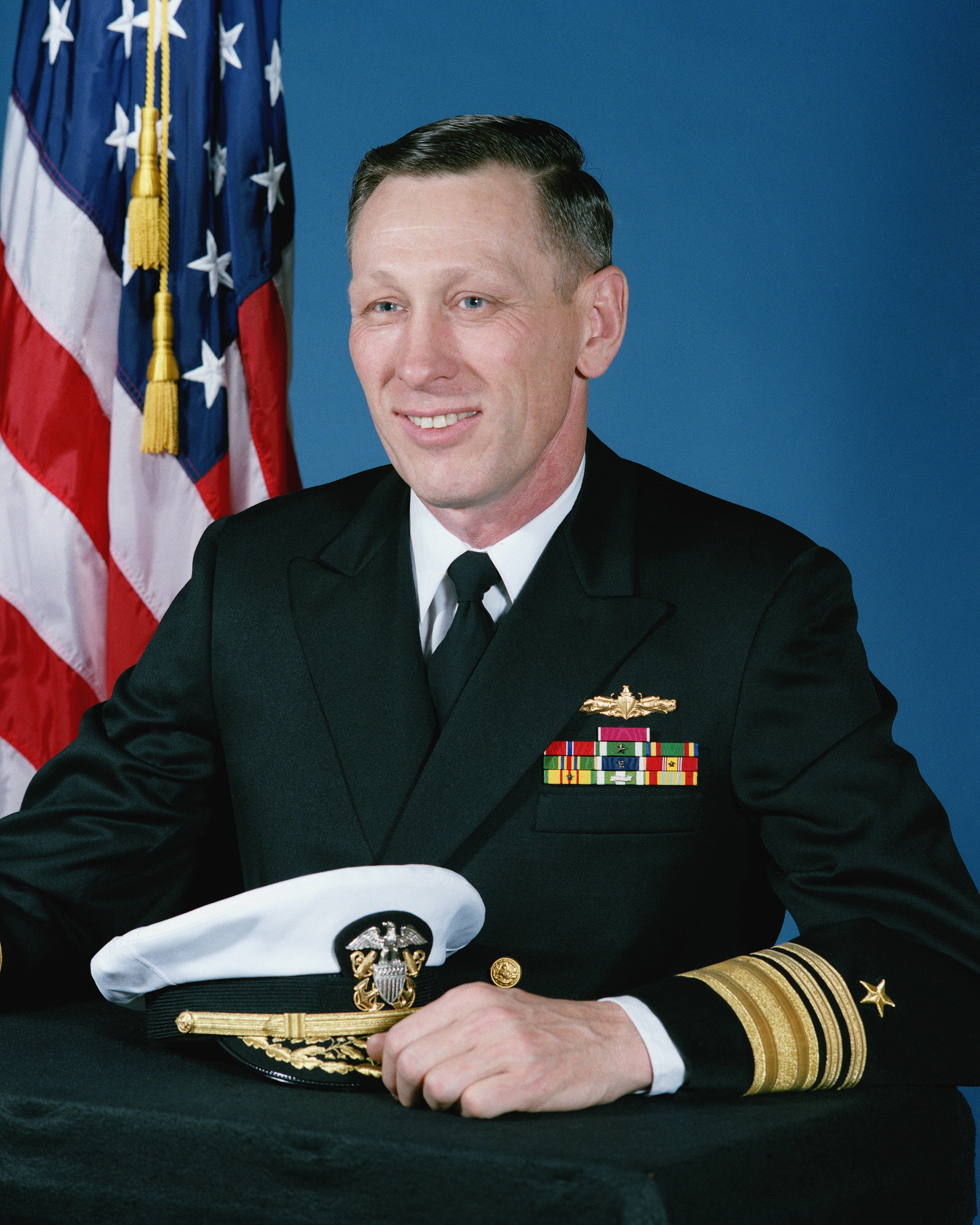
- Official portrait, 1985
- Born: May 29, 1933; Columbia, South Carolina, U.S.
- Died: December 28, 2024 (aged 91)
- Spouse: Jean Davis
- Children: 3
- Military career
- Allegiance: United States
- Branch: United States Navy
- Rank: Vice Admiral
- Commands: USS Virginia (CGN-38)
- Conflicts: Vietnam War
- Awards: Legion of Merit

George Wilmot Davis Jr. (May 29, 1933 – December 28, 2024) was a Vice Admiral in the United States Navy. He served as the first captain of the USS Virginia (CGN-38) from September 1976 to August 1978.

== Biography ==
George Wilmot Davis Jr. was born in Columbia, South Carolina on May 29, 1933. He graduated from the United States Navy Academy in June 1955, and was assigned to the USS Gwin (DM-33). After the USS Gwin was decommissioned in 1958, Davis would go on to serve as the Executive Officer and Captain of multiple other ships in the US Navy. Following that, Davis would briefly serve in the Vietnam War, where he earned the Vietnam Service Medal.

On September 11, 1976, the USS Virginia (CGN-38) was commissioned, and Davis was assigned as the first Captain of the USS Virginia. He would serve as the Captain of the Virginia for just under the next two years until August 1978. In 1980, he was assigned as the Assistant Chief of Staff for Logistics of the Allied Land Forces Southern Europe, a position he would hold for a year until October 1981. In 1985, he was made Vice Admiral of the United States Navy by President Ronald Reagan, a rank he would hold for the next three years. Davis died on December 28, 2024, at the age of 91.
