= USRC Diligence (1796) =

U.S Navy ship

History

United States
- Name: Diligence
- Namesake: None
- Operator: Revenue Cutter Service
- Cost: $28.50 per ton
- Completed: 1797
- Commissioned: 19 October 1798 transferred to U.S. Navy unknown date
- Recommissioned: 20 May 1799 returned to U.S.R.C. Service

General characteristics
- Class & type: Schooner
- Displacement: 187 Tons
- Propulsion: Sail
- Crew: 50
- Armament: 12 X 6 pounders

USRC Diligence was a cutter/schooner operated by the United States Revenue Cutter Service (later to become the US Coast Guard).

== Operational service ==
Diligence was built at Philadelphia, Pennsylvania. Taken into U. S. Navy service during the Quasi War. She was deployed to the Caribbean Sea. Sometime in early 1799 she and USS Eagle captured French ship Reynard. She returned to Wilmington, North Carolina from the Caribbean on/about April 15, 1799. In a letter dated 20 May 1799 Navy Secretary Benjamin Stoddert notified the Treasury Secretary that he should consider her to be officially transferred back to the U.S.R.C. Service. A letter on June 4 from Navy Secretary Benjamin Stoddert notified the Treasury Secretary, Capt. John Brown and the Collector of Customs at Wilmington, North Carolina that control of her was released. At the time she was at Wilmington, North Carolina.

== Commanding officers ==
John Brown 1798 to at least 1799
