= Virginian =

Virginian is a demonym used to describe something as being of, from, or related to the Commonwealth of Virginia of the United States of America; it can be used as both a noun and adjective.

Virginian may also refer to:

== Railroads ==
- Virginian (Amtrak train), a former Amtrak passenger train
- Virginian Railway, a railroad located in Virginia and West Virginia in the United States that operated from 1909 to 1959

== Ships ==
- USS Virginian, two United States Navy vessels
- SS Virginian, a passenger ship built in 1905 that became the Swedish transatlantic liner SS Drottningholm in 1920

== Other uses ==
- Virginian (automobile), an automobile produced briefly by the Richmond Iron Works of Richmond, Virginia
- Virginians, a barbershop chorus

== See also ==
- The Virginian (disambiguation)
- Virginia (disambiguation)
- West Virginia (disambiguation)
- West Virginian (disambiguation)
