= West Virginian =

West Virginian may refer to:

- West Virginia people or related
- West Virginian (Amtrak train), an Amtrak service
- West Virginian (B&O train), a Baltimore and Ohio Railroad train

== See also ==
- West Virginia (disambiguation)
- Virginian (disambiguation)
