= USS Connecticut (1799) =

Ship of the United States Navy

History

United States
- Name: USS Connecticut
- Namesake: State of Connecticut
- Builder: Seth Overton
- Launched: June 6th, 1799
- Commissioned: October 15th, 1799
- Fate: Sold 1801

General characteristics
- Tonnage: 548 tons or 492
- Tons burthen: 514 tons
- Length: 125 ft (38 m)
- Beam: 32 ft (9.8 m)
- Draft: 13 ft 6 in (4.11 m)
- Propulsion: Sails
- Complement: 180 to 220 officers and enlisted men
- Armament: 24 to 26 x 9 and 12pdrs

The Connecticut was a sailing frigate built by Seth Overton at Chatham, Conn. and launched 6 June 1799 at Middletown, Conn. Her construction ran into delays due to an epidemic that struck New York City, where her copper bolts were being forged. During outfitting, probably on or just before 7 July she foundered. She was refloated. She sailed 15 Oct. 1799 under the command of Captain Moses Tryon for the Guadaloupe Station, arriving off Puerto Rico on 28 October. She cruised in the West Indies for a year during the Quasi-War with France, protecting American commerce from French privateers. Connecticut's successful career was highlighted by the capture of four privateers and the recapture of seven American merchantmen. On 7 November 1799 she recaptured schooner "Hannah" captured 72 hours earlier. On 8 December she recaptured brig "Penelope" captured by French privateer "Fleur de Mair" on 3 December. On 28 December she engages captured American schooner "Polly" that is then run ashore a League west of Point Chateaux. After a fight with the prize crew, who were on shore, it was found to be impossible to refloat her and she was burned. On 30 December she captured off Point Petre French privateer brig "Conqueror of Italy" (or "Italic Conqueste"), the most successful privateer operating out of Guadeloupe having captured 200 American merchant ships. "Conquest of Italy" was put in service as a tender for USS Constellation. On 15 January, 1800 She fired upon a privateer (14 guns) but it found shelter by a fort on Demerara, later that day she chased a ship (22 guns) ashore at Deseada which bilged and sank. On 2 April she stopped and detained ex-American schooner "Commerce" that had been captured by a privateer, condemned by Court at Point Peter and sold to a Dane. Capt. Tryon thought her papers were not "regular" and sent her to St. Kitts for evaluation, where she was released. On 28 April, with USS Richmond, she recaptured Thomas Chalkley. On 1 June, she captured privateer schooner "Le Piege" off Descada, and on 3 July recaptured brig "Martha and Mary" on the north side of St. Kitts. On 5 June, captured privateer schooner "La Unite". On 17 June, recaptured a schooner (possibly "Betsy") off Guadalupe. On 15 July, with USS Philadelphia, captured French Letter of Marque ketch "Le Chouchou". Arrived at New London, Conn., 18 Oct. 1800. Capt. Richard Derby was ordered to replace Capt. Tryon on 1 November. In a letter dated 20 February to Josiah Parker, chairman of the Committee on Naval Affairs, Navy Secretary Stoddert recommended selling her. Connecticut was sold at New York in 1801 for $19,300.

In merchant service until 1808, when she was scrapped.

The mensurations are designed by the plan of the Department of the Navy.

== See also ==
- List of sailing frigates of the United States Navy

== Bibliography ==
- Dept U.S.Navy. "Ships Histories Dictionary of American Naval Fighting Ships". Dictionary of American Naval Fighting Ships. Department of the Navy - Naval Historical Center. Archived from the original on August 19, 2000.

Website: https://ussconnecticut1799.com
