= Admiral Duncan (1798 ship) =

British naval vessel

History

Great Britain
- Name: Admiral Duncan
- Namesake: Admiral Lord Adam Duncan
- Builder: Edward Mosley, North Shields
- Launched: 1798
- Fate: Burnt 1800

General characteristics
- Tons burthen: 338 (bm)
- Armament: 10 × 4-pounder guns

Admiral Duncan was launched at Shields in 1798. She traded between Britain and North American until she was burnt in 1800.

Admiral Duncan was first listed in Lloyd's Register (LR) in the issue for 1798.

Year	Master	Owner	Trade	Source
1798	Cuthbert	Holand	London–Halifax	LR
1800	Dove	Humble	Leith–Halifax, Nova Scotia	Register of Shipping

Admiral Duncan, Dare, master, was destroyed by fire at New York, United States. She was on a voyage from New York to Liverpool, Lancashire.

The fire occurred on 17 January 1800 while Admiral Duncan was at the Salter Son & Co. Wharf. The fire company was unable to extinguish the blaze and they cut Admiral Duncan loose to drift out into the water. As she drifted she took several vessels with her. At some point, the brig USS Richmond either was at risk or pulled her out. Eventually Admiral Duncan drifted ashore near the Battery where she was left to burn herself out.
