= West Virginia (disambiguation) =

West Virginia is a state in the United States of America.

West Virginia or Western Virginia may also refer to:

- Western Virginia, a region in the state of Virginia
  - Kentucky County, Virginia, also referred to as "Western Virginia"
- West Virginia, Minnesota
- West Virginia College, a defunct Baptist college
- West Virginia University, the state's largest public university
  - West Virginia Mountaineers, the WVU athletic program
- United States District Court for the Western District of Virginia
- Western Virginia Campaign
- Western Virginia Land Trust
- "West Virginia", a song by John Linnell from the album State Songs, 1999

== U.S. Navy warships ==
- USS West Virginia
  - USS West Virginia (ACR-5), a Pennsylvania-class armored cruiser
  - USS West Virginia (BB-48), a Colorado-class battleship, torpedoed and bombed at Pearl Harbor
  - USS West Virginia (SSBN-736), an Ohio-class ballistic-missile nuclear submarine

== See also ==
- Virginia (disambiguation)
- West Virginian (disambiguation)
- Virginias
- West Virginia in the American Civil War
