= USS Richmond (1798) =

History

United States
- Name: Richmond
- Namesake: Richmond, Virginia
- Acquired: 1798
- In service: 1798
- Out of service: 1801
- Fate: Sold

General characteristics
- Tons burthen: 200 (bm)
- Complement: 140
- Armament: 16x6 pounder guns

USS Richmond was a brig purchased for the US Navy in 1798 by the citizens of Richmond, Petersburg, Manchester and Norfolk, Virginia, while being built at Norfolk as Augusta for a Mr. Myers. Renamed Richmond, she was fitted out in the fall of that year and in December stood out from Hampton Roads for the Caribbean with Captain Samuel Barron in command for service in the Quasi-War with France.

Sailing south, the brig joined Thomas Truxtun's squadron in the West Indies and operated with the ships of that squadron to protect American merchant shipping from French raiders - warships and privateers. Based at St. Kitts, Richmond convoyed merchantmen among the ports of the Lesser Antilles until June 1799. In late April or before 6 May 1799, Richmond, USRC Eagle and USRC Virginia captured the French ship Louis.

In March, 1799 Captain Barron, promoted to a different command, was replaced by Lt. Josias M. Speake.

On 10 June 1799, Richmond departed the West Indies with a convoy bound for Norfolk, whence she continued on to New York. Between 18 July and 6 October, she cruised off the east coast, from Boston to the Virginia Capes, in search of rumored French raiders. In January 1800 Richmond was in New York City and assisted or was threatened by a fire on the brig Admiral Duncan.

In February 1800, Richmond returned to the Caribbean. Based at San Domingo for a year, she re-captured the American schooner Chance on 22 April and with USS Connecticut recaptured Thomas Chalkley on the 28th.

After the end of the Quasi-War with France, Richmond sailed north and in February 1801, she arrived back at New York. In a letter dated 20 February 1801 to Josiah Parker, Chaiman of the Committee on Naval Affairs, Navy Secretary Stoddert recommended selling her. In March most of her crew was detached; and on 1 April she was ordered turned over to the Navy agent at New York to be sold at auction. She sold for $6,250.
