= David Morris Kern =

American businessman (1909–2013)

David Morris Kern (August 4, 1909 – May 3, 2013) was an American pharmacist and businessman. Kern developed and co-invented Orajel, a topical medication applied to relieve pain from toothaches and mouth sores.

Kern was born in 1909 in Manhattan and raised in Brooklyn, New York. He graduated from the Brooklyn College of Pharmacy. Kern began his career as a pharmacist. He then became a salesperson for Norwich Warner Pharmaceuticals (now part of Procter & Gamble).

Kern, together with his brother and two business partners, acquired a pharmaceutical manufacturing facility. According to his family, Kern sought to create an oral medication to relieve tooth pain for teething babies soon after acquiring the manufacturing center. Together with the collaboration a chemistry professor, Kern created and developed Orajel to relieve toothaches. The over-the-counter gel was later used to alleviate mouth sores as well. In 1961, Kern sold the Orajel and the rest of his company to Del Laboratories.

He retired the pharmaceutical industry when he was 62 years old. He then focused on managing the financial affairs of his family. Kern and his wife moved to the Phoenix Metropolitan Area during the 1990s.

Kern died in a nursing facility in Paradise Valley, Arizona, on May 3, 2013, at the age of 103. His wife, Rose Ziedenweber Kern, whom he had been married to for sixty-five years, died in 2001.
