= David J. Kern =

United States Navy officer

David Kern, an officer of the United States Navy, was the first commanding officer of USS Virginia (SSN-774).

Kern earned a Bachelor of Science degree from the United States Naval Academy and was commissioned in May 1981. Upon completion of nuclear power training and Naval Submarine School, he reported to USS Honolulu (SSN-718), homeported in Norfolk, Virginia. He supported deployed ships in the Mediterranean Sea and served as Chemistry and Radiological Assistant and Communicator until the ship was delivered to the Pacific Fleet in 1986. Captain Kern then reported to the Naval Postgraduate School at Monterey, California, and earned a Master's degree in national security affairs.

Captain Kern served as Combat Systems Officer on USS Newport News (SSN-750) and in 1990 received the Stephen Decatur Award for Operational Excellence from the Navy League of the United States. In 1990, he reported aboard USS Cincinnati (SSN-693) as Engineer Officer and deployed to the North Atlantic. In 1992, Captain Kern served as a junior member on the Nuclear Propulsion Examining Board on the staff of the Commander in Chief, U. S. Atlantic Fleet.

Captain Kern reported as Executive Officer on USS Nebraska (SSBN-739 Gold) in 1995 and conducted four strategic deterrent patrols. During his tour, Nebraska's crew earned the Submarine Squadron Twenty Battle "E" Award, the United States Strategic Command's Omaha Trophy, and a Meritorious Unit Commendation. In 1997, Captain Kern was assigned to the Chief of Naval Operations Staff in the Directorate for Submarine Warfare.

In June 1999, Captain Kern took command of USS San Francisco (SSN-711), homeported in Pearl Harbor. Under his leadership, San Francisco was awarded a Secretary of the Navy Letter of Commendation, two consecutive Fleet Golden Anchor Awards, and completed an Engineered Refueling Overhaul three months ahead of schedule.

Captain Kern assumed command of Pre-Commissioning Unit (PCU) Virginia in August 2002. He has been awarded the Meritorious Service Medal (three awards), the Navy Commendation Medal (four awards), the Navy Achievement Medal, and various other unit awards.
