= Virginia Park =

Virginia Park may refer to one of the following places:

== Canada ==
- Virginia Park, Edmonton, Alberta
- Virginia Park, St. John's, Newfoundland

== United Kingdom ==
- Virginia Park (Caerphilly), home ground of Caerphilly RFC
- Virginia Park (Surrey), formerly the Holloway Sanatorium

== United States ==
- Virginia Park Historic District, a neighborhood in Detroit, Michigan
- Virginia Park (Tampa), a neighborhood in Tampa, Florida
