= Virginia Peak (Alaska) =

Mountain in Alaska, United States

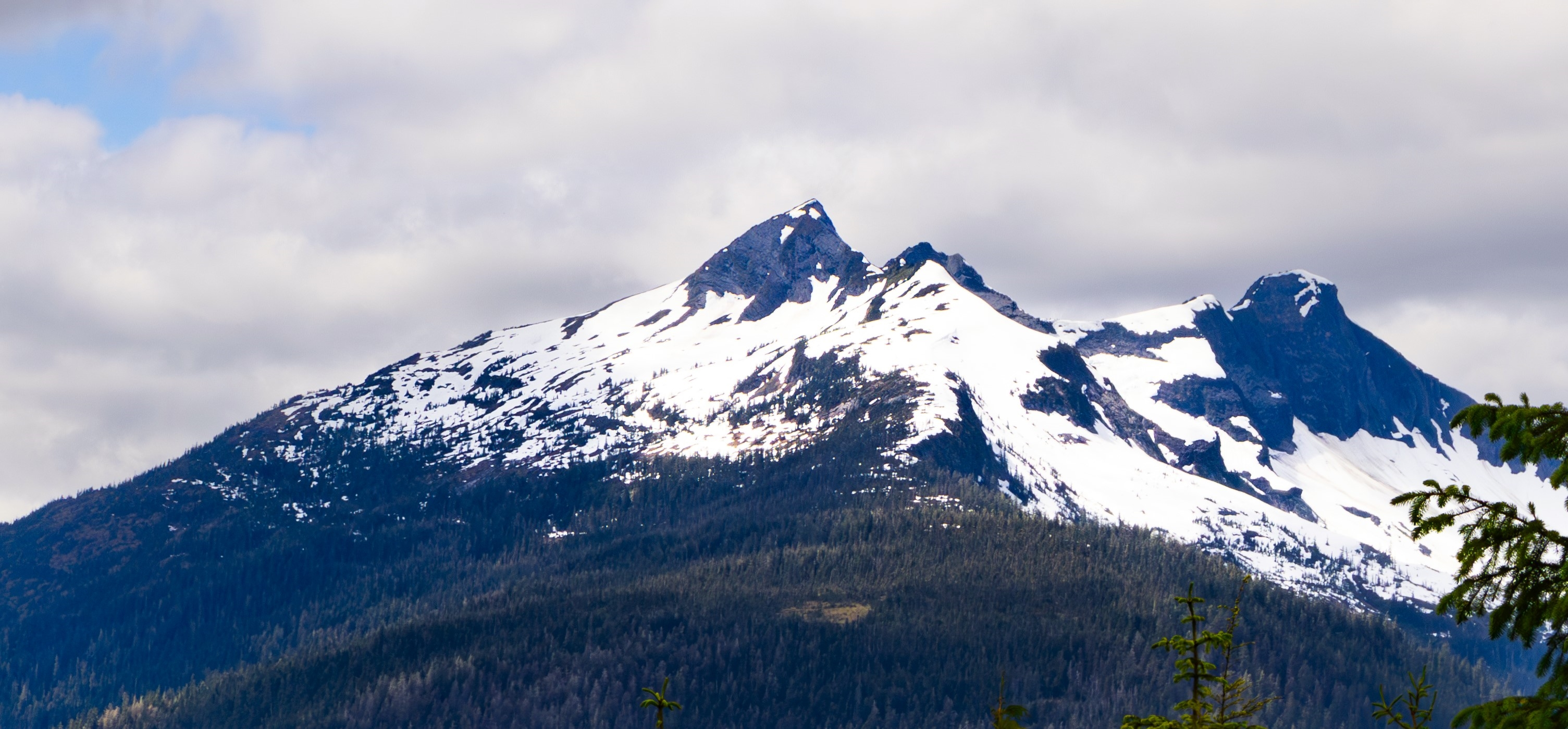
- Northeast aspect

Highest point
- Elevation: 3,760 ft (1,146 m)
- Prominence: 1,010 ft (308 m)
- Parent peak: Helen Peak
- Isolation: 2.48 mi (3.99 km)
- Coordinates: 56°13′31″N 132°26′49″W

Geography
- Location within Alaska
- Country: United States
- State: Alaska
- Borough: Wrangell
- Protected area: Tongass National Forest
- Parent range: Alexander Archipelago
- Topo map: USGS Petersburg A-2

Virginia Peak is a 3,760-foot (1,146 m) mountain summit in Alaska, United States. The peak is located 17 miles (27 km) south-southwest of Wrangell in Tongass National Forest on Etolin Island. Precipitation runoff from the mountain's slopes drains to Anita Bay and Zimovia Strait. Although modest in elevation, topographic relief is significant as the summit rises from sea-level at Anita Bay in 1.3 miles (2.1 km). The mountain was named in 1886 by US Navy Lieutenant Commander Albert Sydney Snow in command of the United States Coast and Geodetic Survey steamer Patterson, and the toponym has been officially adopted by the United States Board on Geographic Names. Virginia Peak is the southernmost peak of the "Three Sisters" along with Helen Peak (3,856 ft) and Bessie Peak (3,915 ft).

== Climate ==
Based on the Köppen climate classification, Virginia Peak is located in a subpolar oceanic zone with mild and rainy summers with cool nights. Winters are moderately cold, though not very cold by Alaskan standards. Winter temperatures can drop below 20 °F with wind chill factors below 10 °F. The months of May and June offer the most favorable weather for viewing and climbing this mountain.

== See also ==
- List of mountain peaks of Alaska
- Geography of Alaska
