= USS Virginia (SSN-774) =

US Navy Virginia-class submarine

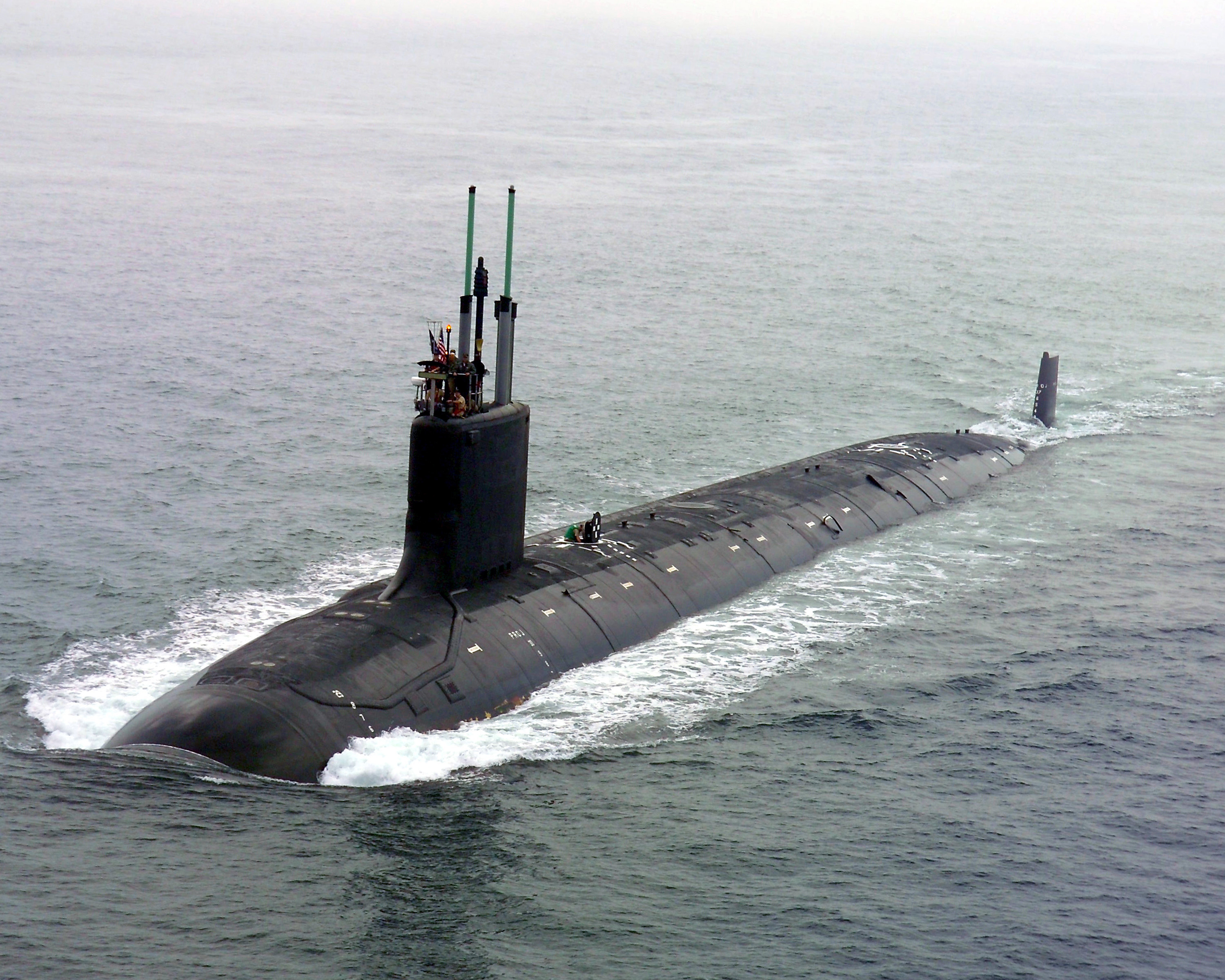

History

United States
- Name: USS Virginia
- Namesake: Commonwealth of Virginia
- Ordered: 30 September 1998
- Builder: General Dynamics Electric Boat
- Laid down: 2 September 1999
- Launched: 16 August 2003; Program cost, US$29 billion; Unit cost, US$6 billion (FY 2011)
- Acquired: 12 October 2004
- Commissioned: 23 October 2004
- Home port: Groton, Connecticut
- Identification: Hull number: SSN-774; MMSI number: 369970229; Callsign: NVIR
- Motto: Sic Semper Tyrannis; ("Thus Always To Tyrants")
- Status: in active service
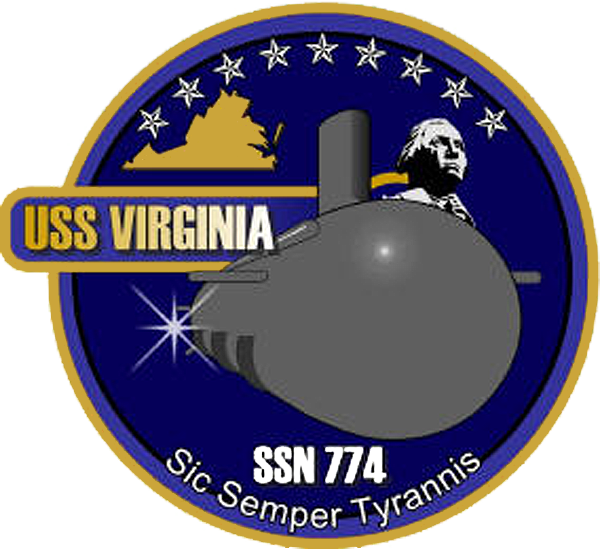
- Badge

General characteristics
- Class & type: Virginia-class submarine
- Displacement: 7,800 tons
- Length: 377 ft (115 m)
- Beam: 34 ft (10.4 m)
- Draft: 32 ft (9.8 m)
- Propulsion: 1 × S9G PWR nuclear reactor 280,000 shp (210 MW), HEU 93%; 2 × steam turbines 40,000 shp (30 MW); 1 × single shaft pump-jet propulsor; 1 × secondary propulsion motor
- Speed: 25 knots (46 km/h)
- Test depth: greater than 800 ft (244 m)
- Complement: 134 (14 officers, 120 enlisted)
- Armament: 12 VLS tubes, four 21 inch (530 mm) torpedo tubes for Mk-48 torpedoes and BGM-109 Tomahawk

USS Virginia (hull number SSN-774) is a nuclear powered cruise missile attack submarine and the lead ship of her class, currently serving in the United States Navy (USN). She is the tenth vessel of the Navy to be named for the Commonwealth of Virginia, as well as the second US Navy attack submarine to be named after a state, a pattern that is common throughout her class.

== History ==
The contract to build her was awarded to the Electric Boat Division of General Dynamics Corporation in Groton, Connecticut on 30 September 1998 and her keel was laid down on 2 September 1999. She was launched on 16 August 2003 sponsored by Lynda Johnson Robb, the wife of former Virginia governor and senator Charles Robb, and daughter of President of the United States Lyndon B. Johnson and Lady Bird Johnson. She was the first U.S. Navy submarine to be completely designed on a computer. On 10 and 11 March, the prospective submarine shot 12 dummy torpedoes into the Thames River, Connecticut, from each of the boat's four tubes.

Virginia was delivered to the Navy on 12 October 2004, the 104th anniversary of the commissioning of Holland, the Navy's first modern, commissioned submarine. She was commissioned on 23 October 2004 under the command of David J. Kern. The commissioning ceremony was featured in the 2005 television series Submarine: Hidden Hunter on Discovery Channel. This class of submarine is unique in that it features a photonics mast that freed ship designers to place the boat's control room in a lower, less geometrically constrained space than would be required by a standard, optical tube periscope. It is additionally unique in the U.S. Navy for featuring all-digital ship and ballast control systems that are operated by relatively senior watchstanders and a pressure chamber to deploy SEALs, divers or other special forces units while being submerged.

On 23 November 2005, Virginia completed her first deployment in support of the Global War on Terrorism. On 12 January 2006, Virginia entered Electric Boat's shipyard for post-shakedown availability, which was expected to last for most of 2006. In April 2010 the submarine returned from a six-month deployment having covered 37,000 miles.

The submarine completed her first 20-month-long overhaul in May 2012.

On 13 November 2024, Virginia accidentally sailed into the nets of Øygutt, a fishing vessel, near the island of Senja, Norway. The Øygutt was fishing for halibut at the time of the incident. The Virginia was able to successfully free itself without further damage to the submarine with assistance from the Norwegian Coast Guard.

== Ship's crest ==
"Emblazoned on a blue background that symbolizes the mighty deep, Virginia is prominently positioned. The forward view of Virginia denotes her leading the submarine force into a new century and onto a new and exciting course for the United States Navy. The gold lettering and border around the seal combined with the blue background represent the Navy's colors of blue and gold. The silhouette of the Commonwealth of Virginia represents the state for which the boat is named. Each of the nine stars represents an American warship named Virginia. The single point of light at the stern of the boat symbolizes both the nuclear propulsion plant that powers the submarine as well as the boat's data processing system fiber optic backbone. In keeping with the Commonwealth of Virginia's motto, the words "Sic Semper Tyrannis" (Latin for "Thus Always To Tyrants") appear at the bottom, which combined with the symbolism of the Commonwealth's Seal, represents the triumph of Virtue over tyranny.

The image of George Washington also looks forward with Virginia. George Washington, a Virginia native, has been characterized as the "indispensable man" vital to the formation of the American republic. In all of history, few men who possessed unassailable power have used that power so selflessly and wisely for the welfare of their countrymen and all mankind. Virginia also stands ready in all her indisputable power to serve the people of America and her allies."

== Commemorative works ==
USS Virginia
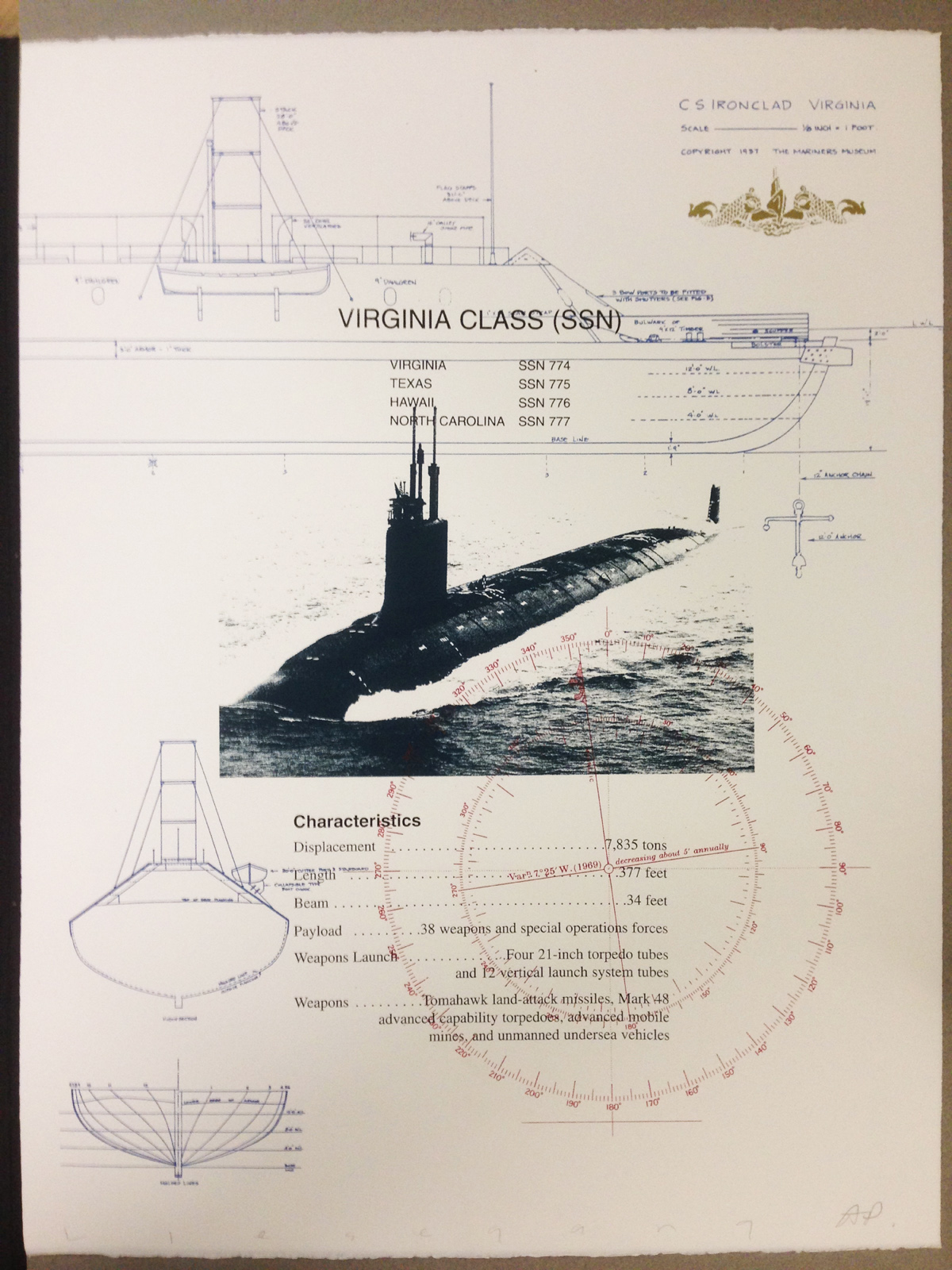
Navy Commissioning print
by Tom Liesegang

The Navy League of the United States commissioned Tom Liesegang to commemorate the USS Virginia in 2004. A print, depicting the submarine on her sea trials, is layered with copies of the CSS Virginia (1862) line drawings obtained from the Mariners' Museum. Ten prints were created for contractors and sponsors, including: Senator John Warner, Admiral Edmund Giambastiani and Lynda Bird Johnson Robb, the daughter of President Lyndon Johnson.
