= West Virginia, Minnesota =

Neighborhood of Mountain Iron, Minnesota, United States

Coordinates: 47°30′56″N 92°34′13″W

West Virginia is a neighborhood of Mountain Iron, Saint Louis County, Minnesota, United States. It was formally absorbed into the city of Mountain Iron in the 1970s.

An unincorporated community before it was absorbed by Mountain Iron, it had a post office which opened as Hopper, changed its name to West Virginia in 1953, then closed in 1960.
