= The Virginia =

Historic commercial building in Virginia, United States

- U.S. National Register of Historic Places
- Virginia Landmarks Register
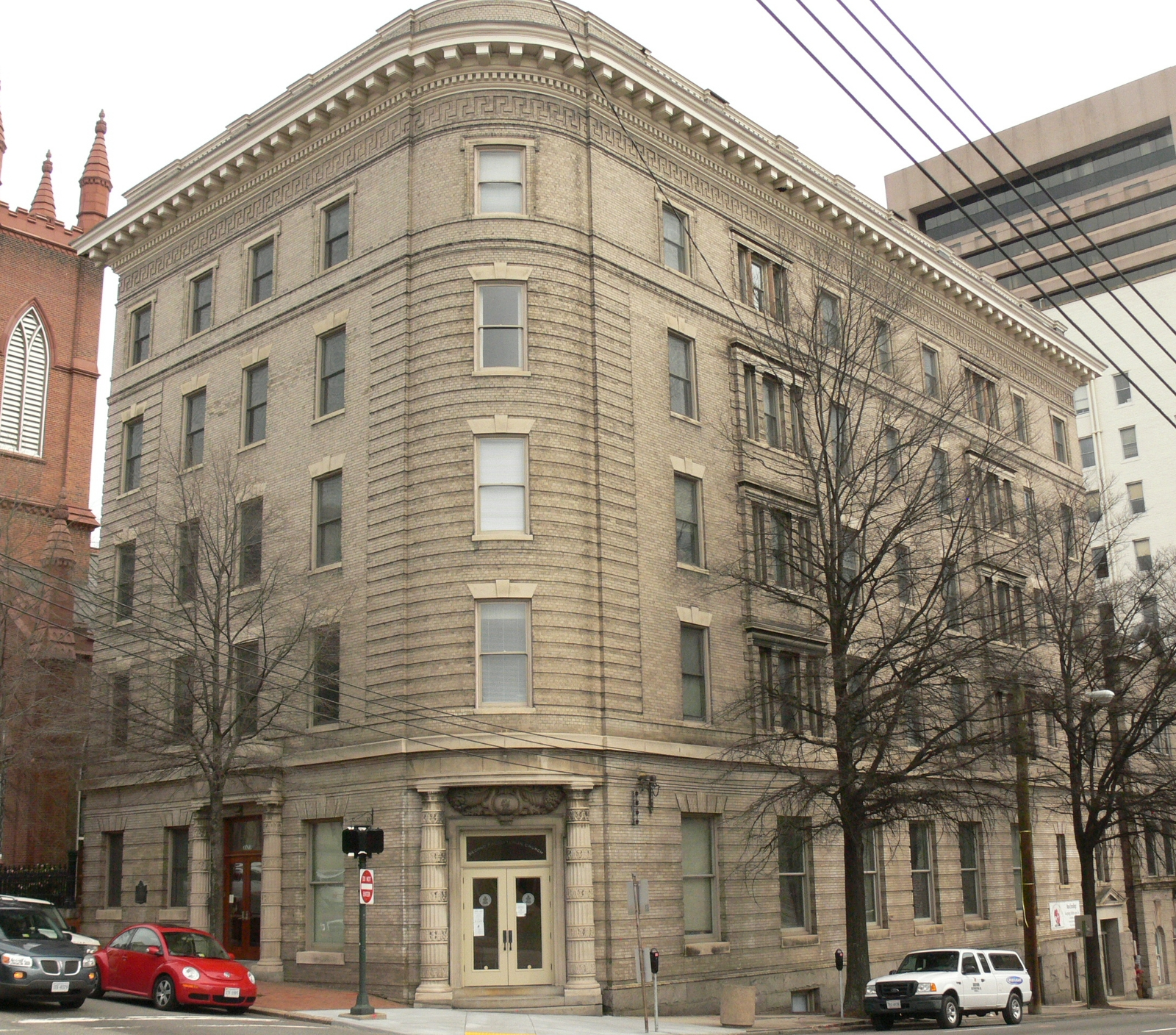
- The Virginia, July 2011

- Location within Virginia Location within the United States
- Location: 1 N. Fifth St., Richmond, Virginia
- Coordinates: 37°32′25″N 77°26′23″W
- Area: 0.1 acres (0.040 ha)
- Built: 1906
- Architectural style: Classical
- NRHP reference No.: 83003310
- VLR No.: 127-0215

Significant dates
- Added to NRHP: February 10, 1983
- Designated VLR: December 14, 1982

The Virginia is a historic apartment / office building located in Richmond, Virginia. It was built in 1906, and is a five-story, Classical Revival style brick building. The building features limestone, granite, and pressed metal decorative elements. The building originally housed the headquarters of the Virginia State Insurance Company.

It was listed on the National Register of Historic Places in 1983.
