= Virginians (singers) =

The Virginians
- Origin: Richmond, Virginia, U.S.
- Genres: Barbershop, choral
- Years active: 1952–present
- Members: Mike Wallen (musical director); Jerry Candrilli (president)
- Website: virginians.org

The Virginians (also known as the Richmond Virginians) is a barbershop chorus located in Richmond, Virginia. Mike Wallen is currently its musical director, and has been serving in this capacity since 1998. It recently celebrated its 70th anniversary and is one of the oldest continuous singing groups in the Greater Richmond Area. Originally chartered in 1952 as the Tobaccoland Chorus, the chapter was renamed to the Virginians in 1990.

The Virginians competed at the 2000 Barbershop Harmony Society International Competition, held at Kansas City, Missouri, numbering 100 on stage. That same year, it sponsored a major benefit performance (featuring the Richmond Symphony Orchestra) for the WRVA Alden Aaroe Shoe Fund at the Landmark Theater. The Virginians chorus was selected to participate at the seventh annual Russian Barbershop Music Festival with Greg Lyne, held in Saint Petersburg, Russia, in 2006.

== Membership ==
The active members of the chorus draw primarily from the city of Richmond, Henrico, Hanover, Chesterfield and eastern Goochland counties. Some members come from as far away as Charlottesville and the Northern Neck, with a strong contingent from the Williamsburg area.

== Activities ==
Annual performances typically include:

- Spring Show, which usually has a theme and a guest quartet or performing group
- Williamsburg Community Show
- Dogwood Dell Show (outdoor performance)
- Christmas Show

The Virginians chorus participates in numerous community appearances with diverse shows that may include performances by its registered chapter quartets. One of its biggest fundraisers is an annual Singing Valentines program.

Most of its repertoire is made up of barbershop arrangements, but the Virginians also sing in other a cappella styles.

== Organization ==
The Virginians chorus is the principal performing group from the Richmond chapter of the Barbershop Harmony Society (based in Nashville) a 501(c)(3) nonprofit charity. It is partially supported by the Arts Council of Richmond.

In addition, the Virginians Ensemble is a daytime chorus (a subset of Richmond chapter members who can perform during the work day) that is very active in the community.

== Early history ==
Originally "organized in the Fall of 1945" with 24 members of local quartets, the Richmond affiliate of SPEBSQSA received its official charter from the society on December 6, 1952, with "almost 40 members". Its Charter Party was attended by "approximately 150 persons". Dean Snyder from SPEBSQSA (and founding member of the Alexandria Harmonizers), presided at the ceremony to hand the charter to then chapter president, Dr. Ralph M. Roberts.

The Richmond affiliate started proceedings to get an official SPEBSQSA charter in September 1952 and open up its membership to men who wanted to sing in an ensemble chorus. Previously, the group had been entirely made up of barbershop quartets.

== Albums ==
Their Blue Skies album was recorded live at the University of Richmond's Modlin Center for the Performing Arts (Camp Theater). The album was released in April 2008.

=== Tobaccoland Chorus albums ===
- Down Where the South Begins was released in the summer of 1969. This album originally sold for $4.50. The record jacket quotes a local columnist who wrote:
  The highly charged sound of our Tobaccoland Chorus comes from a combination of several important ingredients, one of which is the right blend of voices. Add to this some good musical arrangements and lots of rehearsals; mix the batch with top-notch direction and you have a winning sound. The Richmond chapter was chartered in the early 1950s and spent many years trying to find that certain sound. The chorus was moving toward it as Bryan Whitehead took over as director in 1963. It wasn't long before the group was making championship music, as was attested to by its contest winnings during the next several years. Much of the success of the chorus is due to Bryan's dynamic personality, his knowledge of "barbershop," his conception of what the chorus should sound like and his ability to bring out exactly that sound.
- Tobaccoland 30th Anniversary Show was released in 1982. According to the liner notes, this album was recorded live at Richmond's Thomas Jefferson High School on March 26, 1982 and March 27, 1982. This album also includes many songs from chapter quartets: Nickel Bridge, Stage Door, Treasure Chest, Friends of Yesterday.

== Leadership ==
Past musical directors include Bryan Whitehead, Jim Garber, Buddy Johns, John Glass, Hardman Jones, John Hohl, Charlie Bechtler and Gary Parker. Since 1998, the director has been Mike Wallen.
