= USS Virginian (ID-3920) =

American Troop Transport Ship

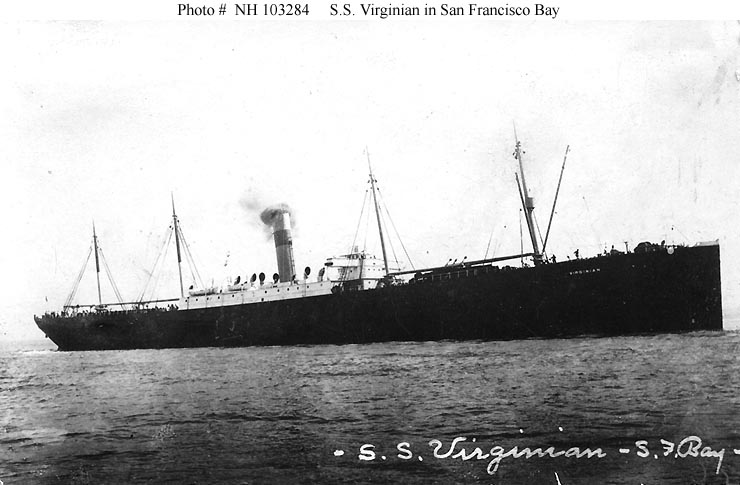
- SS Virginian in San Francisco Bay sometime between 1908 and 1917.

History

United States
- Name: USS Virginian
- Namesake: State of Virginia
- Owner: American-Hawaiian Steamship Company
- Operator: American-Hawaiian Steamship Company
- Builder: Maryland Steel Company, Sparrows Point, Maryland
- Launched: 11 February 1903
- Completed: 1903
- Acquired: Early 1919
- Commissioned: 1 February 1919
- Decommissioned: 19 August 1919
- Fate: Returned to owner 19 August 1919
- Notes: In commercial service as SS Maine 1903-1908 and as SS Virginian 1908-1919 and 1919-1947; Transferred to United States Maritime Commission 1947; Sold for scrapping April 1948

General characteristics
- Type: Troop transport
- Tonnage: 7,914 Gross register tons
- Length: 492 ft 0 in (149.96 m)
- Beam: 58 ft 3 in (17.75 m)
- Draft: 31 ft 9 in (9.68 m)
- Propulsion: Steam engines, two shafts
- Troops: 4,771
- Complement: 106
- Armament: None

USS Virginian (hull number ID-3920) was a United States Navy troop transport in commission in 1919.

== Construction, early career, acquisition, and commissioning ==
Virginian was built in 1903 as the commercial cargo ship SS Maine at Sparrows Point, Maryland, by the Maryland Steel Company for the Atlantic Transportation Company. The American-Hawaiian Steamship Company of New York City purchased her in 1908 and renamed her SS Virginian. Her home port was New York City. The U.S. Navy acquired her early in 1919 for service as a troop transport, assigned her the naval registry Identification Number (Id. No.) 3920, and commissioned her on 1 February 1919 at Hoboken, New Jersey, as USS Virginian.

== United States Navy service ==
Soon after commissioning, Virginian shifted to Fletcher's Dry Dock Company at Hoboken for repairs and conversion into a troop transport. She remained at Fletcher's shipyard through the end of February 1919.

Assigned to the Cruiser and Transport Force, Virginian got underway on 11 March 1919, anchored in New York Harbor abreast the Statue of Liberty. She then moved to Pier 7, Bush Terminal, at Brooklyn, New York, where she took on board cargo -- billet steel, oats, and potatoes—and provisions for her crew. Repairs and alterations necessary to complete her conversion into a troop ship continued until she backed clear of her berth at 17:13 hours on 21 March 1919, with orders to proceed independently to France.

Virginian dropped anchor off Charpentier Point, near St. Nazaire, France, on 3 April 1919, and shifted to St. Nazaire on 4 April 1919. She unloaded her cargo there for the next two days before she began embarking United States Army troops returning home after their World War I service in Europe for transport to the United States. Her passengers included 74 officers and 4,097 enlisted men, from units that ranged from the 362d Infantry Machine Gun Company to the 127th Convalescent Detachment. She got underway at 07:40 hours on 8 April 1919 to return to the United States.

Arriving at the north side of Army Dock Number 7, Hoboken, on the morning of 20 April 1919, Virginian discharged the troops before shifting to the Morse Dry Dock Company at Brooklyn for repairs to her propellers. She shifted back to the Army dock at Hoboken on 27 April 1919, then got underway for Europe on 30 April 1919 to pick up more returning "doughboys" for passage to the United States.

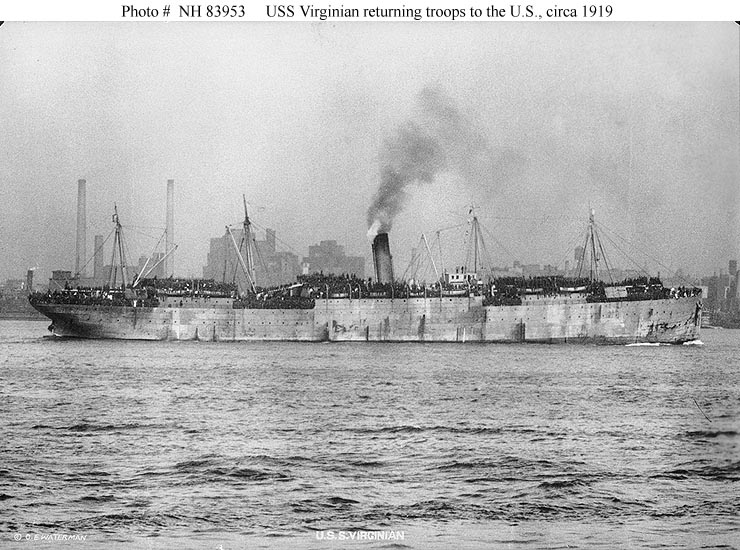
USS Virginian arriving in the United States in 1919 carrying American troops returning from World War I service in Europe.

Virginian reached St. Nazaire on the afternoon of 11 May 1919, took on board 56 officers and 4,069 men, and departed on 13 May 1919 bound for Hampton Roads, Virginia. After a 12-day passage, she moored at the Chesapeake and Ohio Railway docks at Newport News, Virginia, on the afternoon of 25 May 1919 and had all of the troops disembarked within an hour.

After a brief period of upkeep and repairs at the Norfolk Navy Yard at Portsmouth, Virginia, Virginian again departed for France on 1 June 1919. She returned to Hampton Roads carrying returning American servicemen on 25 June 1919.

Virginian departed Hampton Roads on her fourth voyage to pick up troops in France on 1 July 1919. On 3 August 1919, she completed this voyage, arriving at Hoboken. She had discharged the last troops by 09:45 hours on 4 August 1919.

Virginian then began her conversion back into a cargo ship and other preparations for demobilization. After the last troops had disembarked, shipyard workmen and the ship's crew bent to the task of taking down troop fittings, performing routine maintenance tasks, discharging ballasts, cleaning holds, and inventorying equipment. At 16:00 hours on 19 August 1919, she was decommissioned and formally turned over to a representative of the American-Hawaiian Steamship Company, Captain John S. Greene, who as Lieutenant Commander Green had served as USS Virginian's first commanding officer.

== World War II and later career ==
The ship then resumed her mercantile service as cargo ship SS Virginian with the American-Hawaiian Shipping Company. She served that firm, home-ported at New York City, until 1947, when she was transferred to the United States Maritime Commission and laid up. For World War II she was converted to a livestock ship by the War Shipping Administration. She moved horses mules and sometimes sheep. She had the greatest ship livestock capacity, with 679 stalls. One of her trips was a 28-day shipment of 640 former Australian Army animals to Calcutta, India. She was crossing the Atlantic on her return to Baltimore when she learned of the surrender of the Japanese in WWII.

After the war she steamed out of the Baltimore area in June 1945 en route to Italy as one of the first vessels to assist in Heifers for Relief, the precursor to Heifer International as a Seagoing cowboys ship. She made six trips with the Seagoing cowboys to Greece, Poland and Czechoslovakia.

She was sold for scrapping in April 1948.
