= Virginia-class cruiser =

Nuclear guided-missile cruiser class of the US Navy

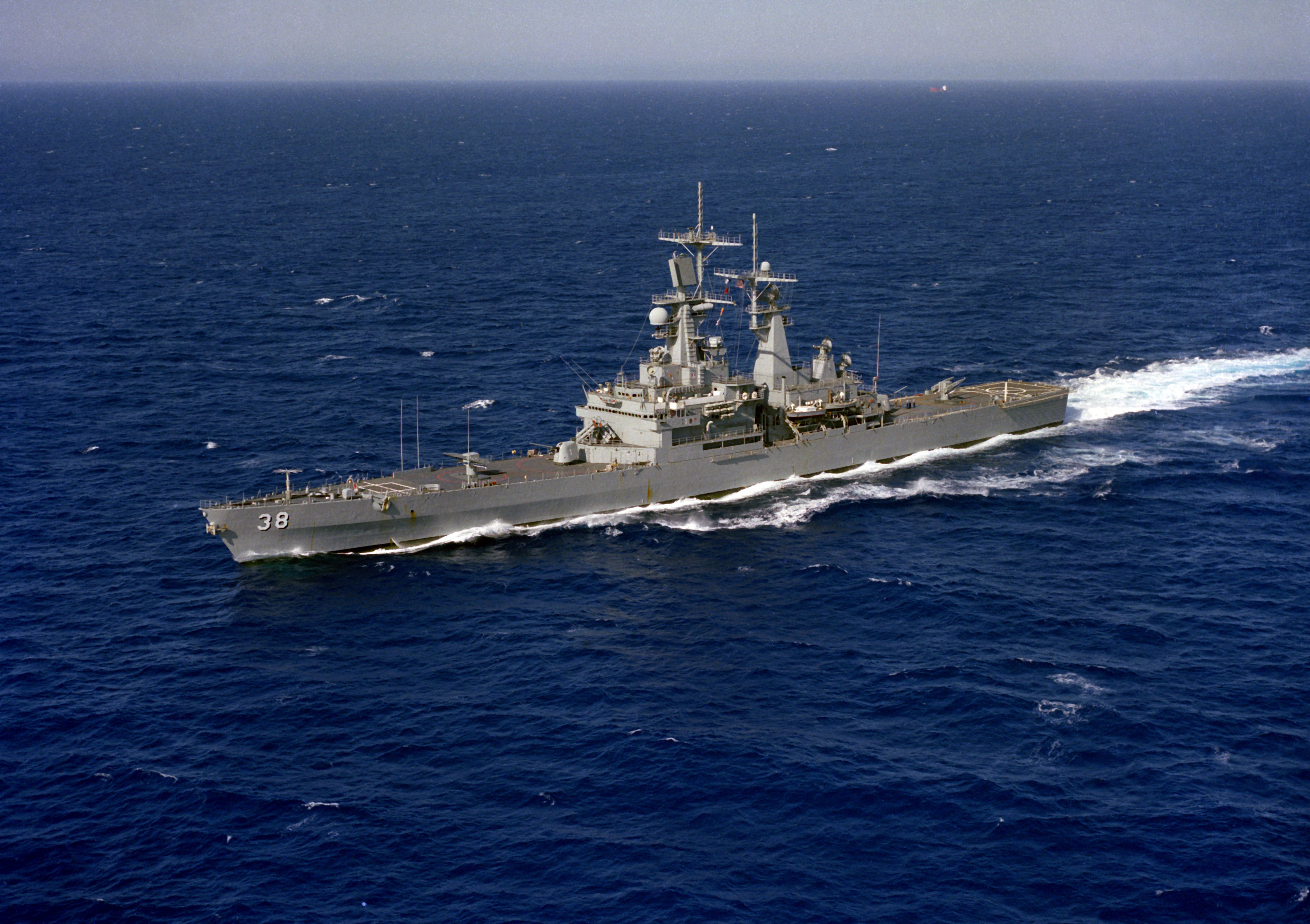
- USS Virginia (CGN-38) at sea

Class overview
- Name: Virginia class
- Builders: Newport News Shipbuilding & Dry Dock Company
- Operators: United States Navy
- Preceded by: California class
- Succeeded by: Strike cruiser (CSGN) (planned); Ticonderoga class (actual)
- Cost: US$675 million (1990) (equivalent to US$1.43 billion in 2024) per unit
- Built: 1972–1980
- In commission: 1976–1998
- Planned: 11
- Completed: 4
- Canceled: 7
- Retired: 4

General characteristics
- Type: Nuclear-powered Guided-missile cruiser
- Displacement: Light displacement: 10,663 long tons (10,834 t); Full displacement: 11,666 long tons (11,853 t)
- Length: 586 ft (179 m) oa.
- Beam: 63 ft (19 m) max.
- Draft: 32 ft (9.8 m) max.
- Propulsion: 2 General Electric D2G nuclear reactors, two shafts, 60,000 shp (45,000 kW)
- Speed: over 30 kn (56 km/h; 35 mph)
- Range: Unlimited
- Complement: 39 officers, 540 enlisted
- Sensors & processing systems: AN/SPS-48E 3-D air search radar; AN/SPS-49 2-D air search radar; AN/SPS-55 surface search radar; AN/SPQ-9A gun fire control radar; AN/SPG-60 fire control radar; AN/SPG-51 missile fire control radar; AN/SQS-26 bow mounted sonar
- Electronic warfare & decoys: AN/SLQ-32; Mark 36 SRBOC; AN/SLQ-25 Nixie
- Armament: 2 × Mk 26 missile launchers for 68 missiles; RIM-66 Standard Missiles (MR) / RUR-5 ASROC; 8 × Tomahawk missile (from 2 armored-box launchers after a refitting); 8 × RGM-84 Harpoon (from two Mk-141 quad launchers); Mk 46 torpedoes (from Mark 32 triple torpedo tubes); 2 × Mk-45 5-inch/54 caliber rapid-fire gun; 2 × 20 mm Phalanx CIWS (post-refit); 2 × 25 mm Mk 38 chain guns; 6 × .50 cal (12.7 mm) M2 machine guns
- Armor: 1 in (25 mm) Kevlar plastic armor installed around combat information center, magazines, and machinery spaces
- Aircraft carried: As built: below-deck hangar for one SH-2F Seasprite helicopter; Flight deck occupied by Tomahawk missile storage & launcher after refitting

The Virginia class (also known as the CGN-38 class) were four nuclear-powered, guided-missile cruisers that served in the United States Navy until the mid-to-late 1990s. They were commissioned between 1976 and 1980. The Virginias were double-ended cruisers, meaning they carried missile armament both fore and aft. This was the final class of nuclear-powered cruisers completed and the last ships ordered as destroyer leaders under the pre-1975 classification system.

The ships had relatively short service lives for surface ships. As nuclear-powered ships, they were expensive to operate. The class was coming up for their mid-life reactor refuelings when the 1994 Defense Authorization Bill was being formulated, which would effect cuts of 38% to the Navy's budget compared to the 1993 bill. The $300-million-plus cost of each refueling and other upgrades made the class easy targets for decommissioning. Each ship was therefore retired, starting with Texas in July 1993 and ending with Arkansas in 1998; all went through the nuclear vessel decommissioning and recycling program.

== Class description ==
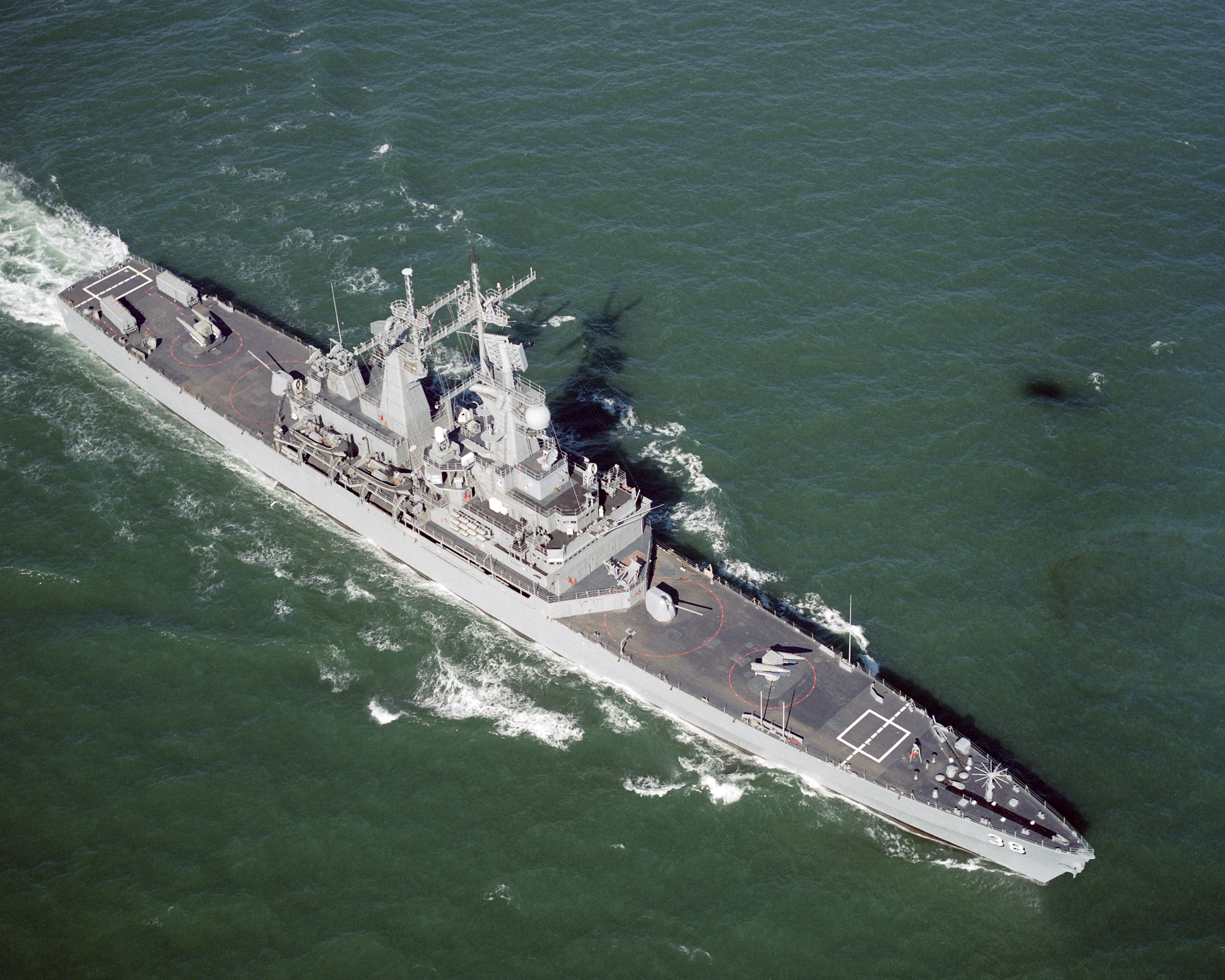
Virginia underway off the coast of Cape Henry, Virginia (VA)

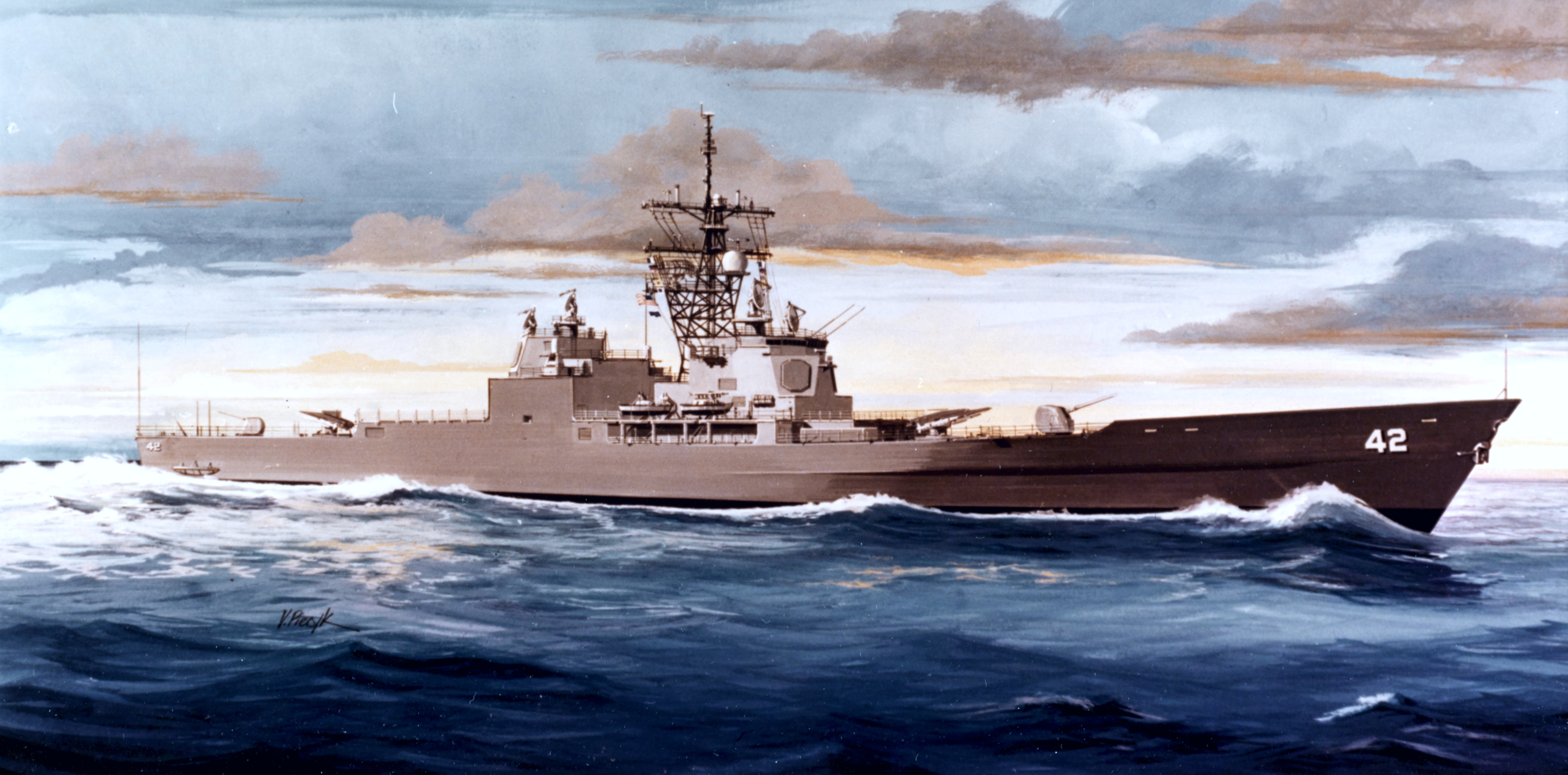
Artist's impression of CGN-42, the planned AEGIS version of the Virginia-class

The ships were derived from the earlier California-class nuclear cruiser (CGN-36 class). Three of the four Virginia-class ships were authorized as guided-missile frigates (in the pre-1975 definition); they were redesignated as cruisers before commissioning or launching. The last ship, Arkansas, was authorized, laid down, launched, and commissioned as a guided-missile cruiser. A fifth member of the class, CGN-42, was canceled before being named or laid down.

With their nuclear power plants and the resulting capability of steaming at high speeds for long periods, these ships were escorts for the fast nuclear-powered aircraft carriers, such as the Nimitz class. They also had flagship facilities. Their primary mission was as air-defense ships, while they also had capabilities as anti-submarine warfare (ASW) ships, surface-to-surface warfare (SSW) ships, and in gun and missile bombardment of shore targets.

The Virginia class, as designed, carried one LAMPS helicopter aft of the superstructure with a flight deck. In a unique arrangement in the U.S. Navy, the hangars were below deck, with an electro-mechanical elevator covered by a telescopic hatch. This improved over the preceding California class, which only had a landing pad aft and basic refueling equipment.

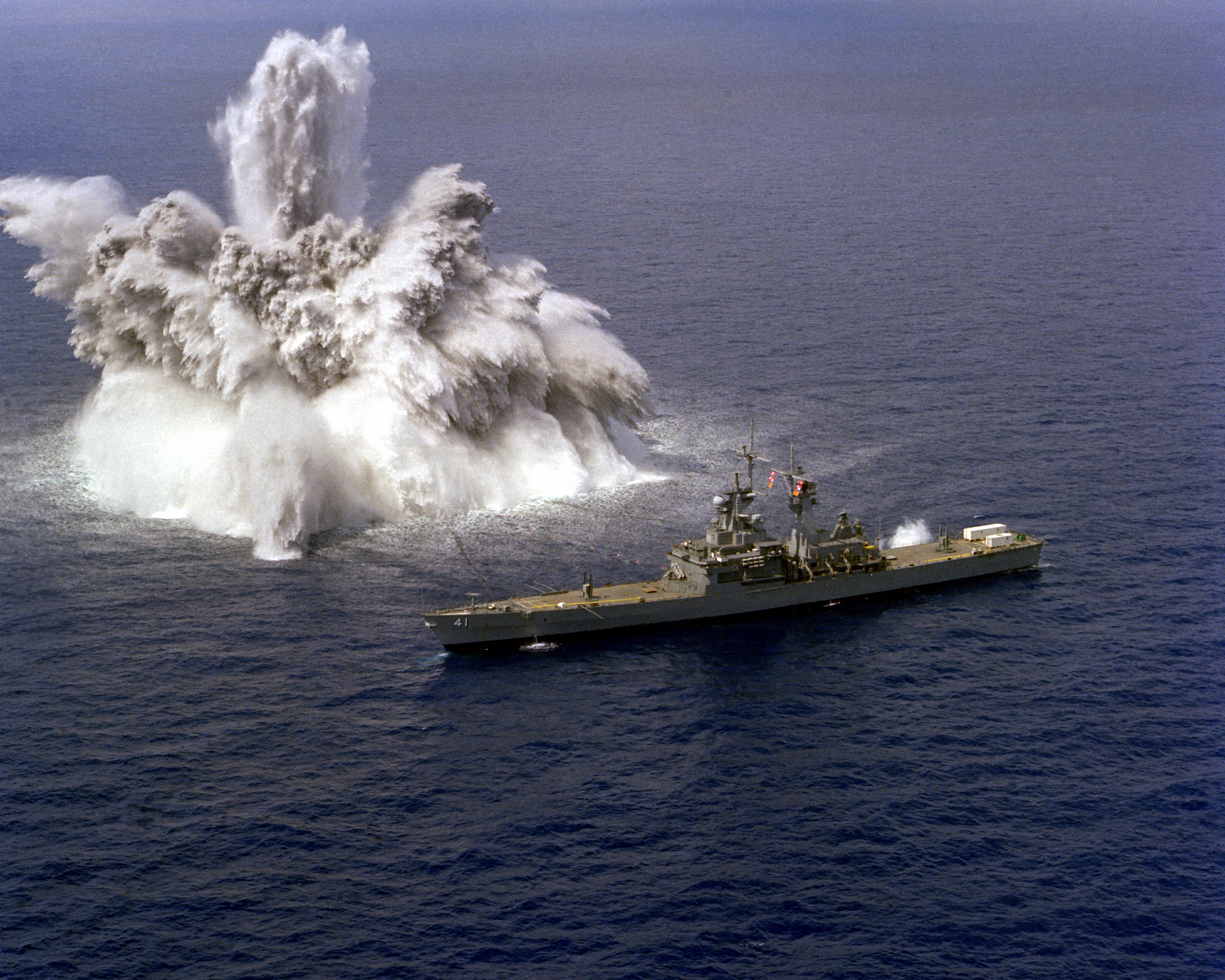
A shock trial of Arkansas in 1982

It was found that, while it was possible to mass-produce nuclear-powered warships, the ships were less cost-efficient than conventionally powered warships. Also, the new gas turbine-powered ships then entering the fleet—the Spruance-class destroyers—required much less manpower. While eleven ships of the Virginia class were planned, only four were produced, and the remainder were canceled. Following the completion of the final member of the class, Arkansas, the U.S. Navy continued conventional destroyer/cruiser production, and it redesignated the DDG-47 class of guided-missile destroyers as the CG-47 Ticonderoga-class cruisers.

=== Refit ===
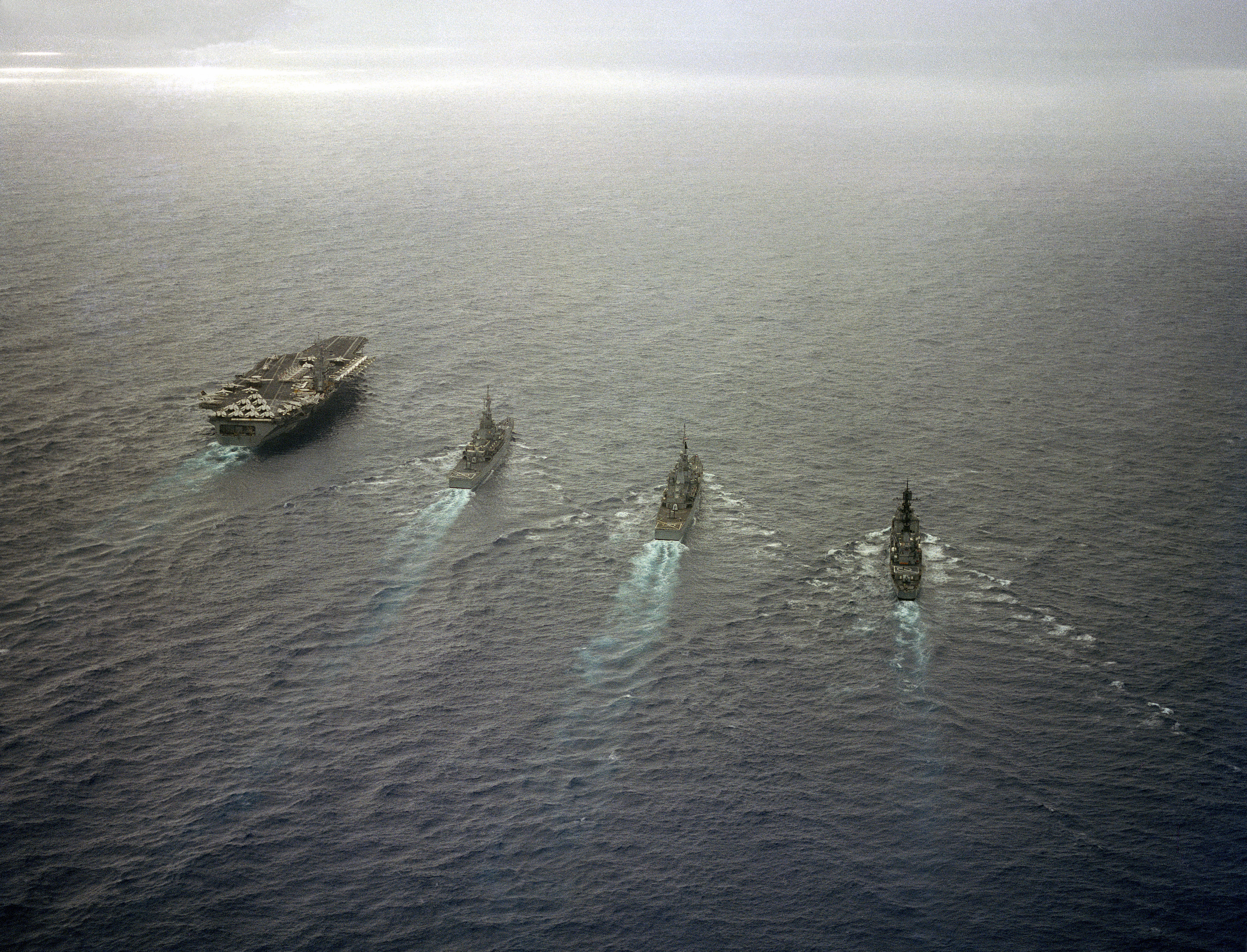
Mississippi and Texas (second and third from left) underway with the aircraft carrier Nimitz and cruiser Biddle in the Mediterranean Sea, August 1981

In the 1980s, the class received a New Threat Upgrade electronics overhaul to better suit them to modern threats. Their rapid-fire Mk 26 launchers could fire the powerful Standard SM-2MR medium-range surface-to-air missile—earlier decommissioned cruisers used the slower-firing Mk 10 launchers, which required manual fitting of the missiles' fins prior to launch. Nevertheless, the CGN-38-class cruisers, with their missile magazines and Mk 26 missile launchers, were incapable of carrying the SM-2ER long-range surface-to-air missile; they were restricted to the SM-2MR medium-range surface-to-air missile. This was a significant limitation in their capabilities.

Each member of the class also received Tomahawk cruise missile armored box launchers. The Tomahawk missiles were installed, even though this meant the removal of the LAMPS helicopter as it was found that the elevator and below-deck hangar proved problematic during aviation operations.

=== Early decommissioning ===
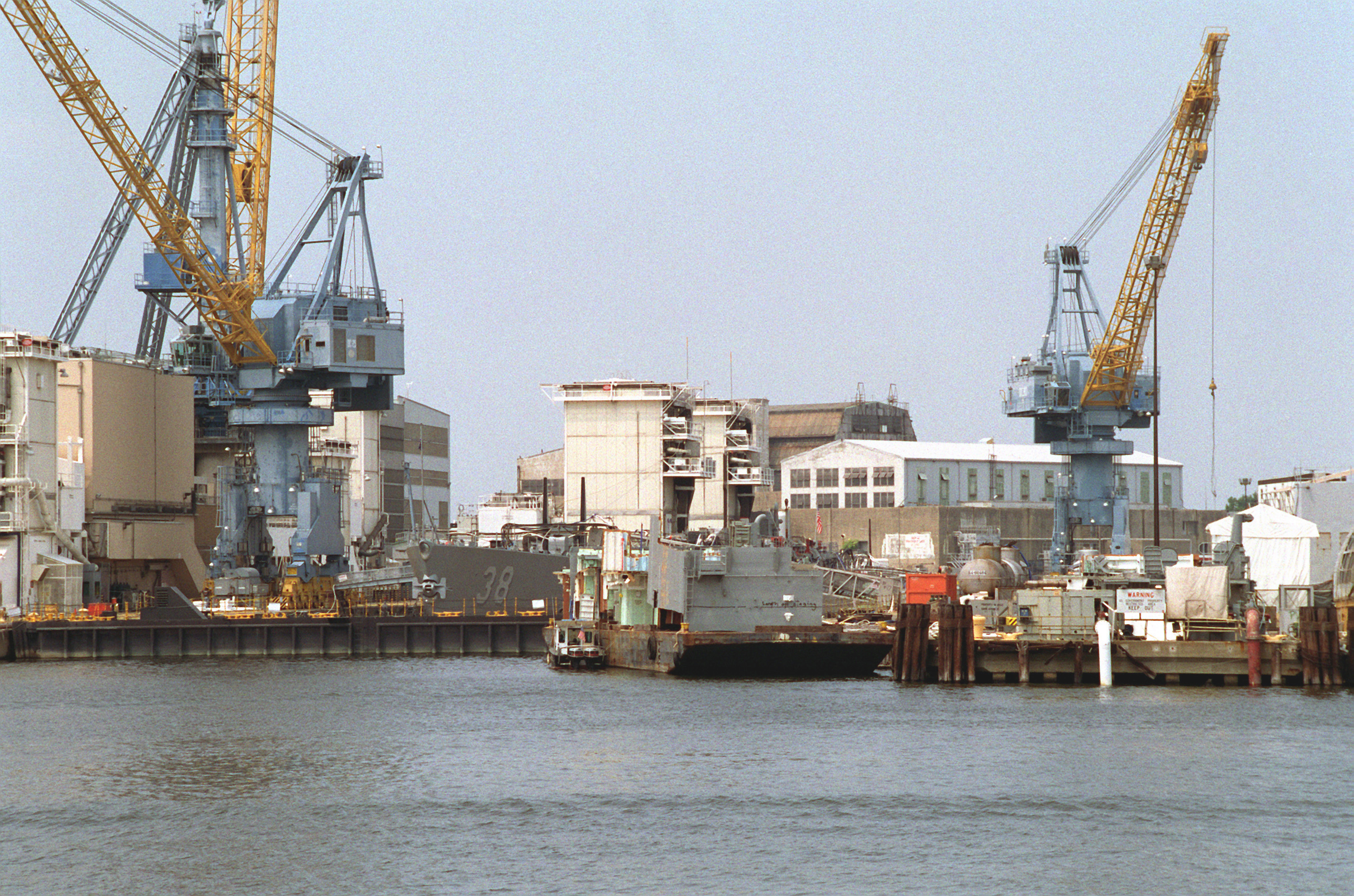
Virginia in drydock at Norfolk Naval Shipyard, Portsmouth Virginia; the ship's superstructure has been removed and replaced by containment vessels to allow the safe removal of her nuclear reactors

All four vessels were decommissioned as part of the early 1990s "peace dividend" after the Cold War ended, considered by naval standards an early retirement given their designed service life of 38 years. Despite being of a modern design with a recent refit, what doomed the Virginia nuclear-powered cruisers was a lack of resources, as the Navy and other branches of the U.S. military faced major budget cutbacks after the Cold War. The ships of the class were coming due for their first nuclear refuelings, mid-life overhauls, and NTU refittings, which were all budgeted projects, together costing about half the price of a new ship. Further, they required relatively large crews, straining the operating budget. The 1996 Navy Visibility and Management of Operating and Support Costs (VAMOSC) study determined the annual operating cost of a Virginia-class cruiser at $40 million, compared to $28 million for a Ticonderoga-class cruiser, or $20 million for an Arleigh Burke-class destroyer, the latter two classes designed with the much more capable Aegis Combat System. Given a lower requirement for cruisers, it was decided to retire the Virginia class and other nuclear-powered ships as a money-saving measure, a decision made while Texas was in the middle of her refueling overhaul. The early Ticonderoga-class cruisers, which lacked the Vertical Launch System, had equally short careers, serving between 18 and 21 years.

== Ships in class ==
| Name | Hull no. | Builder | Ordered | Laid down | Launched | Commissioned | Decommissioned | Fate | NVR link |
|---|---|---|---|---|---|---|---|---|---|
| Virginia | CGN-38 | Newport News Shipbuilding & Dry Dock Company, Newport News | 21 December 1971 | 19 August 1972 | 14 December 1974 | 11 September 1976 | 10 November 1994 | Disposed of through Ship-Submarine Recycling Program at Bremerton, 1999 | |
| Texas | CGN-39 | Newport News Shipbuilding & Dry Dock Company, Newport News | 21 December 1971 | 18 August 1973 | 9 August 1975 | 10 September 1977 | 16 July 1993 | Disposed of through Ship-Submarine Recycling Program at Bremerton, 1999 | |
| Mississippi | CGN-40 | Newport News Shipbuilding & Dry Dock Company, Newport News | 21 January 1972 | 22 February 1975 | 31 July 1976 | 5 August 1978 | 28 July 1997 | Disposed of through Ship-Submarine Recycling Program at Bremerton, 2004 | |
| Arkansas | CGN-41 | Newport News Shipbuilding & Dry Dock Company, Newport News | 31 January 1975 | 17 January 1977 | 21 October 1978 | 18 October 1980 | 7 July 1998 | Disposed of through Ship-Submarine Recycling Program at Bremerton, 1998 | |
| | CGN-42 | —N/a | | | | | | Intended nuclear-powered AEGIS cruiser; canceled 1983 | |

== See also ==
- List of cruisers of the United States Navy
- List of United States Navy destroyer leaders
- Nuclear powered cruisers of the United States Navy
