= USRC Virginia (1791) =

1791 sailing vessel previously operated by the U.S. Revenue Cutter Service

History

United States
- Name: Virginia
- Namesake: Virginia
- Operator: Revenue Cutter Service
- Launched: 1791
- Commissioned: 1791
- Decommissioned: 1798
- Fate: Sold, 1798

General characteristics
- Class & type: Schooner
- Displacement: 47 Tons
- Length: 56 ft 2 in
- Beam: 17 ft 6 in
- Draft: 6 ft 6 in
- Propulsion: Sail
- Crew: 4 officers, 4 enlisted, 2 boys

USRC Virginia was one of the first ten cutters operated by the United States' Revenue Cutter Service (later to become the US Coast Guard).

== Operational service ==
Virginia was preceded by two state revenue vessels, the Liberty and Patriot, that had active careers on Chesapeake Bay well before the establishment of the "system of cutters," as the first ten Federal cutters were known. President George Washington appointed Richard Taylor, a veteran of the navy of the state of Virginia who was twice wounded during the American Revolutionary War, as master of the Virginia.

As with her sister cutters, little documentation has survived regarding Virginia's service. It is known that she was ordered to prevent all vessels hailing from Philadelphia, Tobago, or the Grenadines from sailing into Chesapeake Bay during an outbreak of yellow fever at those locations in 1793. She probably also enforced the Embargo instituted by President Washington in 1794. Enforcing the Embargo included preventing the arming and fitting out of privateers, either French or British, in American ports. Virginia was involved in one such enforcement action when she attempted to seize the French-flagged privateer Unicorn. By this time, Virginia's master, Richard Taylor, had resigned his commission due to his failing physical condition brought on by his war injuries. First Mate John Lurty had taken command of the cutter although for unknown reasons he never received a promotion to the position of master.
