= USS West Virginia =

Three ships of the United States Navy have been named USS West Virginia in honor of the 35th state.

- USS West Virginia (ACR-5) was a Pennsylvania-class cruiser.
- USS West Virginia (BB-48) was a Colorado-class battleship.
- USS West Virginia (SSBN-736) is an Ohio-class submarine.
