= USRC Virginia (1797) =

Ship of the U.S. Revenue Cutter Service (1797)

History

United States
- Name: USS Virginia
- Namesake: The first English colony in America and one of the original 13 states.
- Launched: 1797
- Decommissioned: 1800
- Fate: Returned to Revenue Cutter service.

United States
- Name: USRC Virginia
- Commissioned: 1802
- Fate: Sold in 1807

General characteristics
- Class & type: Schooner
- Displacement: 187 tons
- Length: 50 ft (15 m) on Keel
- Beam: 18 ft 10 in (5.74 m)
- Depth of hold: 8 ft 6 in (2.59 m)
- Propulsion: Sail
- Complement: 70 officers and enlisted
- Armament: 6 × 6-pounder cannon; 8 × 4-pounder cannon

USRC Virginia was a schooner built in 1797 for the United States Revenue Cutter Service at Portsmouth, Virginia. At the outset of the Quasi-War in 1798, the only ships available to the Navy were the 10 ships of the Revenue cutter service, the largest of which was the Virginia. She was transferred to the Navy in 1798 and served in the Quasi War until 1800, when she was returned to the Revenue Cutter Service, recommissioned in 1802 and sold in 1807.

== History ==
The revenue cutter Virginia was a schooner built in 1797 for the United States Revenue Cutter Service at Portsmouth, Virginia. Her Master was Francis Bright. At the outset of the Quasi-War in 1798, the only ships available to the Navy were the 10 ships of the Revenue Cutter Service, the largest of which was the newly built Virginia. Operational control was transferred to the United States Navy on 25 June.

In August 1798, Virginia received orders to join the frigate Constellation off the eastern seaboard of the United States for operations against suspected French warships and merchant ships. She remained on this station until December, when she was assigned identical duty in the West Indies between St. Kitts and Puerto Rico as part of the squadron commanded by Commodore Thomas Truxtun. In addition to cruising with the Navy squadrons, Virginia guarded convoys and relayed messages between fleets. While on duty in the Caribbean, Virginia, assisted by Richmond and Eagle, captured the armed French schooner Louis and her cargo sometime in late April or before 6 May, 1799.

Despite this success, in a letter dated 3 June 1799 Navy Secretary Benjamin Stoddert notified the Treasury Secretary that he should consider her to be officially transferred back to the U.S.R.C. Service. She was refitted and commissioned in the Revenue Cutter service in 1802. She was sold in 1807.
