= Charles A. Richard =

US Navy admiral

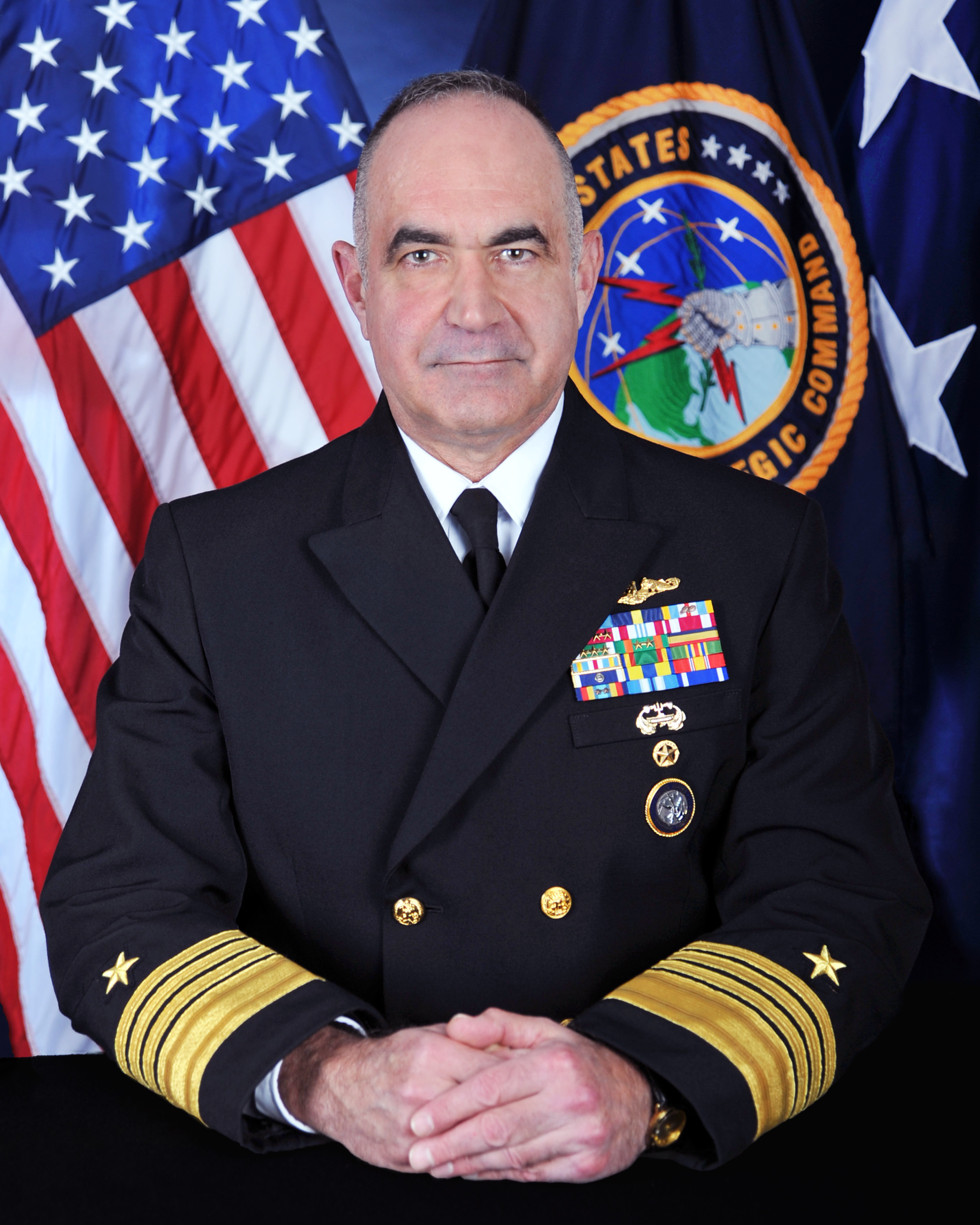
- Born: 1959 (age 66–67); Decatur, Alabama, U.S.
- Education: University of Alabama (BS); Catholic University of America (MA)
- Military career
- Allegiance: United States
- Branch: United States Navy
- Service years: 1982–2022
- Rank: Admiral
- Nickname: Chas
- Commands: United States Strategic Command; Submarine Forces; Submarine Force Atlantic; Allied Submarine Command; Submarine Group 10; Submarine Squadron 17; Deep Submergence Vessel NR-1; USS Parche (SSN-683)
- Awards: Defense Distinguished Service Medal (2); Navy Distinguished Service Medal; Defense Superior Service Medal (3); Legion of Merit (5)

Charles Anthony "Chas" Richard (born 1959) is a retired United States Navy admiral. As of 2026, he serves as president of the Institute for Defense Analyses. He previously served as the 11th commander of United States Strategic Command and as Commander Submarine Forces, Submarine Force Atlantic and Allied Submarine Command.

== Early life and education ==
Richard is a native of Decatur, Alabama, and is a 1982 graduate with honors from the University of Alabama. He has earned master's degrees with honors from the Catholic University of America and the Naval War College.

== Naval career ==
Richard's operational assignments included command of USS Parche (SSN-683) as well as Submarine NR-1, then the United States Navy's only nuclear-powered, deep-submergence submarine. He also served aboard USS Portsmouth (SSN-707), USS Asheville (SSN-758) and USS Scranton (SSN-756).

Richard's staff assignments included service as the executive assistant and naval aide to the Under Secretary of the Navy; chief of staff, Submarine Force Atlantic; and command of Submarine Squadron 17 in Bangor, Washington. Other staff assignments include director of resources, Under Secretary of Defense (Policy); squadron engineer of Submarine Squadron 8 and duty on the Deputy Chief of Naval Operations (Submarine Warfare) staff. He has also served as a member of Chief of Naval Operations' Strategic Studies Group XXVIII, studying the integration of unmanned systems into naval force structure.

Flag officer assignments include command of Submarine Group 10 in Kings Bay, Georgia; director of Undersea Warfare (OPNAV N97), Pentagon, and deputy commander, Joint Functional Component Command for Global Strike at United States Strategic Command.

As commander, Submarine Forces, Richard was the undersea domain lead, and was responsible for the submarine force's strategic vision. As commander, Submarine Force Atlantic, he commanded all Atlantic-based United States submarines, their crews and supporting shore activities. These responsibilities also included duties as Commander, Task Force (CTF) 144, CTF 84; commander, Anti-Submarine Warfare (ASW) Forces Western Atlantic; and CTF 46. As commander, Allied Submarine Command, he provided advice to the North Atlantic Treaty Organization Strategic Commanders on submarine related issues.

On October 15, 2019, Richard was nominated for promotion to admiral and reassignment as the commanding officer of United States Strategic Command. He appeared for a hearing before the United States Senate Committee on Armed Services on October 24 and was confirmed by voice vote of the full Senate on October 31. He took over from General Hyten on November 18, 2019. In October 2021, Politico reported that Richard was among the candidates shortlisted to succeed Hyten as vice chairman of the Joint Chiefs of Staff.

Richard retired from active duty on December 9, 2022. As of 2024, he serves as a Senior Fellow at the Johns Hopkins Applied Physics Laboratory.

== Awards and decorations ==

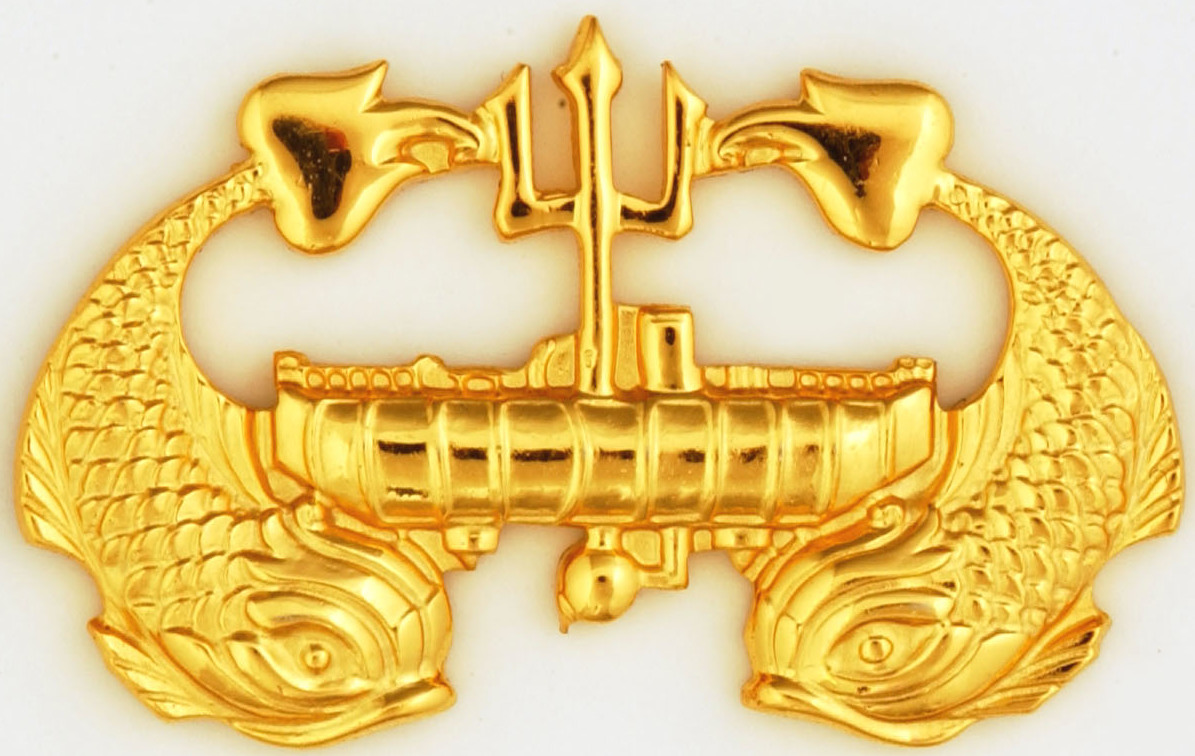

Officer Submarine Warfare insignia
Defense Distinguished Service Medal w/ 1 bronze oak leaf cluster	Navy Distinguished Service Medal	Defense Superior Service Medal w/ 2 oak leaf clusters
Legion of Merit w/ 4 gold award stars	Defense Meritorious Service Medal	Meritorious Service Medal
Navy and Marine Corps Commendation Medal w/ 3 award stars	Navy and Marine Corps Achievement Medal w/ 2 award stars	Navy Presidential Unit Citation
Joint Meritorious Unit Award	Navy Unit Commendation	Navy Meritorious Unit Commendation
Navy "E" Ribbon with wreathed Battle E award	Navy Expeditionary Medal	National Defense Service Medal w/ 1 bronze service star
Navy Sea Service Deployment Ribbon w/ 2 service stars	Navy Arctic Service Ribbon	NATO Medal for the former Yugoslavia
Officer Deep Submergence insignia
Command at Sea insignia
United States Strategic Command Badge

Military offices
Preceded by ???	Deputy Commander of Joint Functional Component Command for Global Strike; 2012–2013	Succeeded by Richard J. Evans III
Preceded by Joseph E. Tofalo	Commander of Submarine Group 10; 2013–2015	Succeeded by Randy B. Crites
Preceded by Joseph E. Tofalo	Director of Undersea Warfare of United States Navy; 2015–2016	Succeeded by William R. Merz
Preceded by Richard J. Evans III; Acting	Deputy Commander of the United States Strategic Command; 2016–2018	Succeeded by David Kriete
Preceded by Joseph E. Tofalo	Commander of Naval Submarine Forces and Submarine Force Atlantic; 2018-2019	Succeeded by Daryl L. Caudle
Preceded by Joseph E. Tofalo	Commander of the Allied Submarine Command; 2018-2019	Succeeded by Daryl L. Caudle
Preceded by John E. Hyten	Commander of the United States Strategic Command; 2019–2022	Succeeded by Anthony J. Cotton
