= USS Hartford (SSN-768) =

Los Angeles-class nuclear-powered attack submarine of the US Navy

- USS Hartford (SSN-768)

History

United States
- Name: USS Hartford
- Namesake: The City of Hartford, Connecticut
- Awarded: 30 June 1988
- Builder: General Dynamics Electric Boat
- Laid down: 22 February 1992
- Launched: 4 December 1993
- Sponsored by: Mrs. Laura O'Keefe, wife of former Secretary of the Navy Sean O'Keefe
- Commissioned: 10 December 1994
- Home port: New London, Connecticut
- Motto: "Damn the torpedoes, full speed ahead"
- Status: in active service
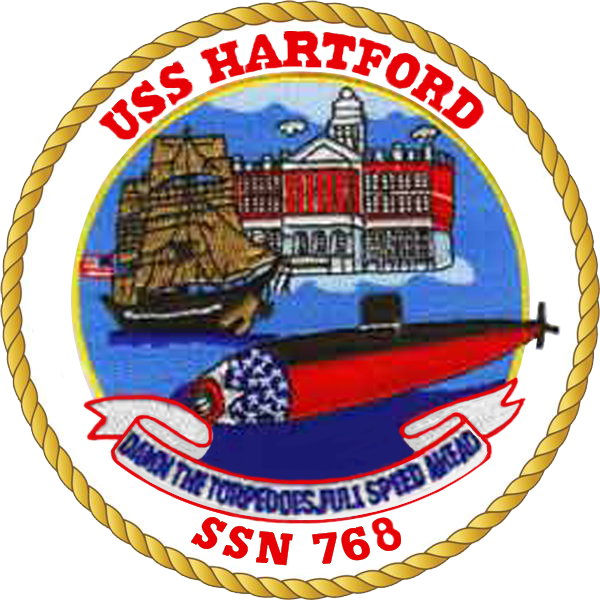
- Badge

General characteristics
- Class & type: Los Angeles-class submarine
- Displacement: 6,000 long tons (6,096 t) light; 6,927 long tons (7,038 t) full; 6,927 long tons (7,038 t) dead
- Length: 110.3 m (361 ft 11 in)
- Beam: 10 m (32 ft 10 in)
- Draft: 9.4 m (30 ft 10 in)
- Propulsion: 1 × S6G PWR nuclear reactor with D2W core (165 MW), HEU 93.5%; 2 × steam turbines (33,500) shp; 1 × shaft; 1 × secondary propulsion motor 325 hp (242 kW)
- Complement: 12 officers, 98 men
- Armament: 4 × 21 in (533 mm) torpedo tubes 12 × vertical launch Tomahawk missiles

USS Hartford (SSN-768), a Los Angeles-class submarine, is the second ship of the Navy to be named for Hartford, Connecticut. The contract to build her was awarded to the Electric Boat Division of General Dynamics Corporation in Groton, Connecticut on 30 June 1988 and her keel was laid down on 22 February 1992. She was launched on 4 December 1993 sponsored by Laura O'Keefe, wife of former Secretary of the Navy Sean O'Keefe, and commissioned on 10 December 1994, with Commander George Kasten in command.

In October 2007, the submarine successfully launched and recovered an AN/BLQ-11 Long-Term Mine Reconnaissance System unmanned underwater vehicle (UUV)—the first such operation from a submarine. The vehicle was launched via one of the boat's torpedo tubes and recovered with the help of a 60-foot robotic arm.

== In the news ==
=== 2003 grounding in Sardinia ===
On 25 October 2003 Hartford ran aground near La Maddalena in Sardinia with such force that rudders, sonar and other electronic equipment were severely damaged. After the accident Commander Christopher R. Van Metre, captain of Hartford, and Captain Greg Parker, Commodore of Submarine Squadron 22, were relieved of command and sent back to the United States. Six other crewmen were also charged with dereliction of duty.

=== 2009 collision in Strait of Hormuz ===
On 20 March 2009 Hartford collided with amphibious transport dock USS New Orleans (LPD-18) in the Strait of Hormuz, slightly injuring 15 sailors on board. Both vessels were able to proceed under their own power after the incident, although the New Orleans suffered a ruptured fuel tank, releasing 25,000 gallons of diesel fuel into the strait.

Hartford was escorted back to homeport by destroyer USS Laboon (DDG 58). Laboon was, at the time, attached to NATO under Standing NATO Maritime Group 2 and was directed to break away and perform escort duties by Sixth Fleet.

The Navy announced on 14 April 2009 that the submarine's skipper, Commander Ryan Brookhart, had been relieved of duty by Rear Admiral Michael J. Connor because of a loss of confidence in Brookhart's ability to command. Brookhart was replaced by Commander Chris Harkins, deputy commander of Submarine Squadron Eight.

A repair contract was awarded to General Dynamics. Repairs were initially expected to cost $37.4 million and be completed by January 2010. However, by November 2009, repair costs had already exceeded $100 million. Final repair cost was $120 million when Hartford returned to duty in February, 2011

=== Modernization ===
On 29 July 2022 a $698M contract was awarded to General Dynamics Electric Boat to repair and modernize the Hartford.

== Service history ==
Hartford took part in ICEX 2018, surfacing through the Arctic ice on 21 March.
