= LMRS =

LMRS may refer to:

- Long-Term Mine Reconnaissance System
- Land Mobile Radio Service
