= Joint Functional Component Command for Space and Global Strike =

Military unit

Joint Functional Component Command for Space and Global Strike (JFCC SGS) was a component of the United States Strategic Command. It was headquartered at Offutt Air Force Base, Nebraska. The Commander, JFCC SGS was dual hatted as the Commander, Eighth Air Force and Commander, JFCC SGS. On 19 July 2006, JFCC SGS was reorganized into two separate JFCCs: Joint Functional Component Command for Global Strike and Integration (JFCC GSI) and Joint Functional Component Command for Space (JFCC SPACE).

== Mission statement ==
The JFCC SGS provided integrated Space and Global Strike capabilities to deter and dissuade aggressors and when directed, defeat adversaries through decisive joint global effects in support of United States Strategic Command global missions.

== History and background ==
Established in May 2002, JFCC SGS optimized operational-level planning, execution, and force management for the USSTRATCOM mission of deterring attacks against the United States. When directed, JFCC SGS integrated all elements of military power in collaboration with all USSTRATCOM components, National Agencies, and other Combatant Commanders to support or execute Space and Global Strike operations. Through the Joint Space Operations Center (JSpOC) at Vandenberg Air Force Base, the JFCC SGS directed day-to-day planning and execution of assigned military Space missions. JFCC SGS was activated 9 August 2005. The Air Operations Center at Barksdale Air Force Base supported JFCC SGS with operations planning and execution capabilities. Cruise Missile Support Activities Atlantic (Norfolk, VA) and Pacific (Camp Smith, HI) provide Tomahawk cruise missile planning capabilities. The Joint Information Operations Center in San Antonio, Texas, provided Information Operations expertise. The Department of Defense Manned Space Flight Support Office (DDMS), headquartered at Patrick Air Force Base, Florida, coordinated military support for manned space flight operations.

USSTRATCOM officials formally announced that Joint Functional Component Command for Space and Global Strike, as of 18 November 2005 , had met requirements necessary to declare an Initial Operational Capability (IOC) following a rigorous test of integrated planning and operational execution capabilities during Exercise Global Lightning.

With the signing of the new Implementation Directives on 19 July 2006, JFCC SGS stood down and Joint Functional Component Command for Global Strike and Integration (JFCC GSI) and Joint Functional Component Command for Space (JFCC SPACE) stood up. While the space mission and some billets transferred from JFCC GSI to JFCC SPACE, the leadership and HQ location for JFCC GSI remained the same as it was for JFCC SGS.

JFCC SPACE is headquartered at Vandenberg AFB, CA. Its first and current commander is Air Force Maj Gen William L. Shelton. MG Shelton, who is also commander of 14 AF, was nominated in November 2007, for his third star, to remain as commander JFCC SPACE.

== Past Commanders ==
- Lt Gen Bruce A. Carlson, USAF (2002-2005)
- Lt Gen Kevin P. Chilton, USAF (2005–2006)
- Lt Gen Robert J. Elder, Jr., USAF (2006–2009)
- Maj Gen Floyd L. Carpenter, USAF (2009-2011)
- Maj Gen Stephen W. Wilson, USAF (2011-2013)
- Maj Gen Scott A. Vander Hamm, USAF (2013-2015)
- Maj Gen Richard M. Clark, USAF (2015-2016)
- Maj Gen Thomas A. Bussiere, USAF (2016-2017)

== Operations ==
JFCC SGS integrated all elements of military power as it conducts, plans and presents global strike effects. Operations included:

- Lead integrated operational planning among all USSTRATCOM Components
- Provided integrated analysis of the command's global mission capabilities
- Developed and provided Space and Global Strike execution recommendations
- Supported USSTRATCOM's Strategic Command and Control mission
- Operational and tactical control of global strike forces as directed
- Provided continuous space situational awareness of assigned space forces
- Coordinated tasking to other joint components and service task forces for synchronizing USSTRATCOM operational and tactical mission planning and execution needs
- Supported USSTRATCOM nuclear command and control and force execution responsibilities
- Coordinated and maintained tactical level intelligence supporting the operational needs of space and global strike component commands

== Personnel ==
JFCC SGS was currently authorized over 400 military and government civilian billets with 270 assigned today.
