= Robert J. Elder Jr. =

United States Air Force general

Lt. Gen. Robert J. Elder Jr.
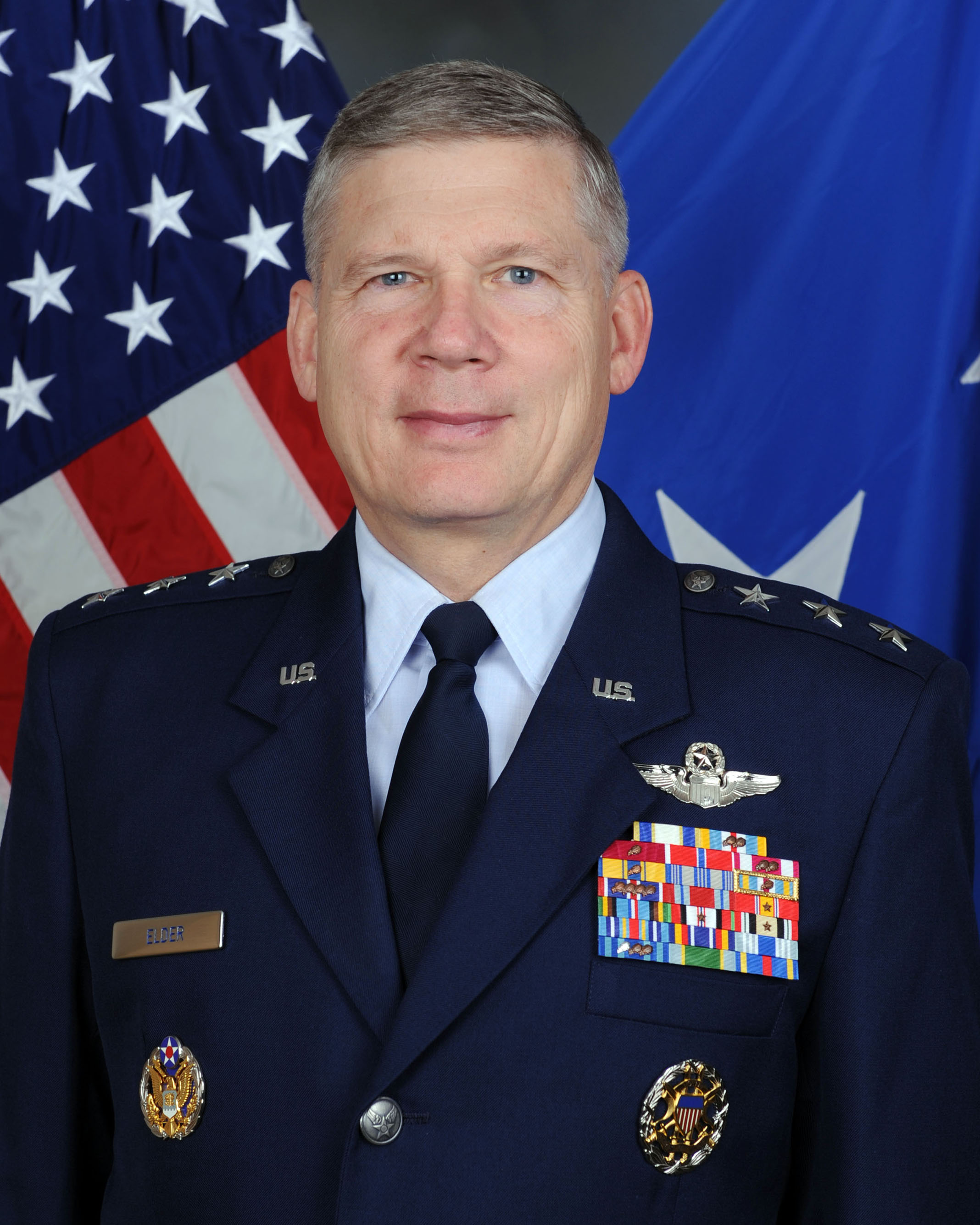
- U.S. Air Force Photo
- Born: October 15, 1952 (age 73)
- Military career
- Allegiance: United States of America
- Branch: United States Air Force
- Service years: 1975–2009
- Rank: Lieutenant general
- Nickname: "Bob"
- Units: Air Force Network Operations; Joint Functional Component Command for Global Strike and Integration
- Commands: 8th Air Force; 596th Bombardment Squadron; 5th Bomb Wing
- Conflicts: Operation Iraqi Freedom; Operation Enduring Freedom
- Awards: Defense Superior Service Medal; Legion of Merit; Bronze Star; Meritorious Service Medal; Air Force Commendation Medal; Air Force Achievement Medal

Lieutenant General Robert J. "Bob" Elder Jr. (born October 15, 1952) is the former Commander, 8th Air Force; Commander, Barksdale Air Force Base, Louisiana; and Commander, Joint Functional Component Command for Space and Global Strike, U.S. Strategic Command, Offutt AFB, Nebraska. He is now a member of the research faculty at George Mason University. As one of three active-duty numbered air forces in Air Combat Command, 8th Air Force provides long-range global strike, battle management, surveillance and reconnaissance, intelligence, information operations, tactical air control, and expeditionary heavy construction capabilities to combatant commanders. The "Mighty Eighth" also conducted computer network operations as the Air Force component to the Joint Task Force for Global Network Operations before that duty was transferred to 24th Air Force, and trains Air and Space Operations Center personnel for worldwide deployment and participation in the multinational Joint Expeditionary Force Experiment.

As the Joint Functional Component Commander for Space and Global Strike, General Elder serves as the lead integrator for USSTRATCOM crisis action planning, conducts global strike planning to deliver rapid, extended range, kinetic and non-kinetic effects in support of theater and national objectives, and provides situational awareness and integrated analysis of global mission capabilities for all STRATCOM operational responsibilities. General Elder also commands Task Force 204, which is responsible for monitoring all nuclear bomber, reconnaissance, and cruise missile generation operations. The Task Force 204 battlestaff is a cross-functional team that manages the generation, sustainment, logistics, security and safety of more than 100 B-2, B-52 Stratofortress, U-2, EP-3 and RC-135 aircraft at seven bases.

== Biography ==
=== Education ===
- 1970 University of Detroit Jesuit High School, Michigan
- 1975 Bachelor's degree in electrical engineering, University of Detroit, Michigan
- 1975 Master's degree in engineering, University of Detroit, Michigan
- 1979 Squadron Officer School, by correspondence
- 1985 Doctor of Engineering, University of Detroit, Michigan
- 1987 Distinguished graduate, Air Command and Staff College, Maxwell AFB, Alabama
- 1989 Air War College, by seminar
- 1991 National War College, Fort Lesley J. McNair, Washington, D.C.
- 1997 Senior Executive Program, Columbia University Graduate School of Business, New York, N.Y.
- 2001 Senior Executive Course, George C. Marshall College of International and Security Studies, Garmisch, Germany
- 2002 Combined Force Air Component Commander Course, Maxwell AFB, Alabama
- 2005 Joint Flag Officer Warfighting Course, Maxwell AFB, Alabama
- 2005 Systems Acquisition Management for General/Flag Officers Course, Fort Belvoir, Virginia
- 2006 Pinnacle Course, National Defense University, Fort Lesley J. McNair, Washington, D.C.

=== Assignments ===
- May 1976, student, undergraduate pilot training, Reese Air Force Base, Texas
- May 1977, student, B-52G combat crew training, Castle Air Force Base, California
- November 1977, B-52G co-pilot, 28th Bombardment Squadron, Robins Air Force Base, Georgia
- December 1980, Program Manager, F-15 Avionics Integration Support Facility, Warner Robins Air Logistics Center, Robins AFB, Georgia
- October 1982, Global Positioning System Program officer, Air Staff Training Program, Headquarters U.S. Air Force, Washington, D.C.
- April 1983, Requirements Program officer, Air Staff Training Program, Headquarters U.S. Air Force, Washington, D.C.
- September 1983, student, B-52G combat crew training, Castle AFB, California
- April 1984, B-52G flight commander, instructor pilot, 69th Bombardment Squadron, Loring Air Force Base, Maine
- August 1985, chief, B-52 Standardization and Evaluation Division, 42nd Bombardment Wing, Loring AFB, Maine
- August 1986, student, Air Command and Staff College, Maxwell Air Force Base, Alabama
- June 1987, executive officer to the Commander, Headquarters 8th Air Force, Barksdale AFB, Louisiana
- September 1988, commander, 596th Bombardment Squadron, Barksdale AFB, Louisiana
- July 1990, student, National War College, Fort Lesley J. McNair, Washington, D.C.
- June 1991, chief, Strategic and Space Forces Branch, later, Chief, Forces Division, Directorate for Force Structure, Resources and Assessment, the Joint Staff, Washington, D.C.
- July 1993, commander, 5th Operations Group, Minot Air Force Base, North Dakota
- December 1994, director, Chief of Staff Operations Group, Headquarters U.S. Air Force, Washington, D.C.
- August 1996, commander, 5th Bomb Wing, Minot AFB, North Dakota
- July 1998, assistant director of aerospace operations, Headquarters Air Combat Command, Langley Air Force Base, Virginia
- April 2000, deputy director, NATO Reaction Force Air Staff, Allied Command Europe, Kalkar, Germany
- October 2001, vice commander, 9th Air Force, and Deputy Commander, U.S. Central Command Air Forces, Shaw Air Force Base, South Carolina
- June 2003, commander, CENTAF-Forward Combined Air Headquarters; Deputy Commander, 9th Aerospace Expeditionary Task Force; and Deputy Combined Forces Air Component Commander, USCENTCOM, Southwest Asia
- July 2004, commandant, Air War College, and Vice Commander, Air University, Maxwell AFB, Alabama
- June 2006, commander, 8th Air Force; Commander, Air Force Network Operations, Barksdale AFB, Louisiana; and Joint Functional Component Commander for Space and Global Strike, U.S. Strategic Command, Offutt AFB, Nebraska
- July 2009, retired.

=== Flight information ===
- Rating: Command pilot
- Flight hours: More than 4,000
- Combat hours: 83 (Operations Enduring Freedom and Iraqi Freedom)
- Aircraft flown: E-8 Joint STARS, B-52 Stratofortress, T-38 and T-37

=== Awards/Decorations ===
- Defense Superior Service Medal with two oak leaf clusters
- Legion of Merit with oak leaf cluster
- Bronze Star
- Meritorious Service Medal with two oak leaf clusters
- Air Force Commendation Medal with oak leaf cluster
- Air Force Achievement Medal

=== Promotions ===
- Second lieutenant May 10, 1975
- First lieutenant December 4, 1977
- Captain December 1, 1979
- Major August 1, 1984
- Lieutenant colonel July 1, 1988
- Colonel January 1, 1992
- Brigadier general January 1, 2000
- Major general October 1, 2003
- Lieutenant general June 13, 2006

== Works ==
=== Published works ===
- "Non-Invasive Assessment of Pilot Workload with Flight Computer Generated Primary Measures," doctoral dissertation, University Microfilm International, 1985
- "A Strategic Approach to Advanced Technology Trade with the Soviet Union," Comparative Strategy, January–March 1992

== See also ==
- Joint Functional Component Command for Space and Global Strike
