= Kevin P. Chilton =

American astronaut and Air Force general (born 1954)

Kevin Chilton
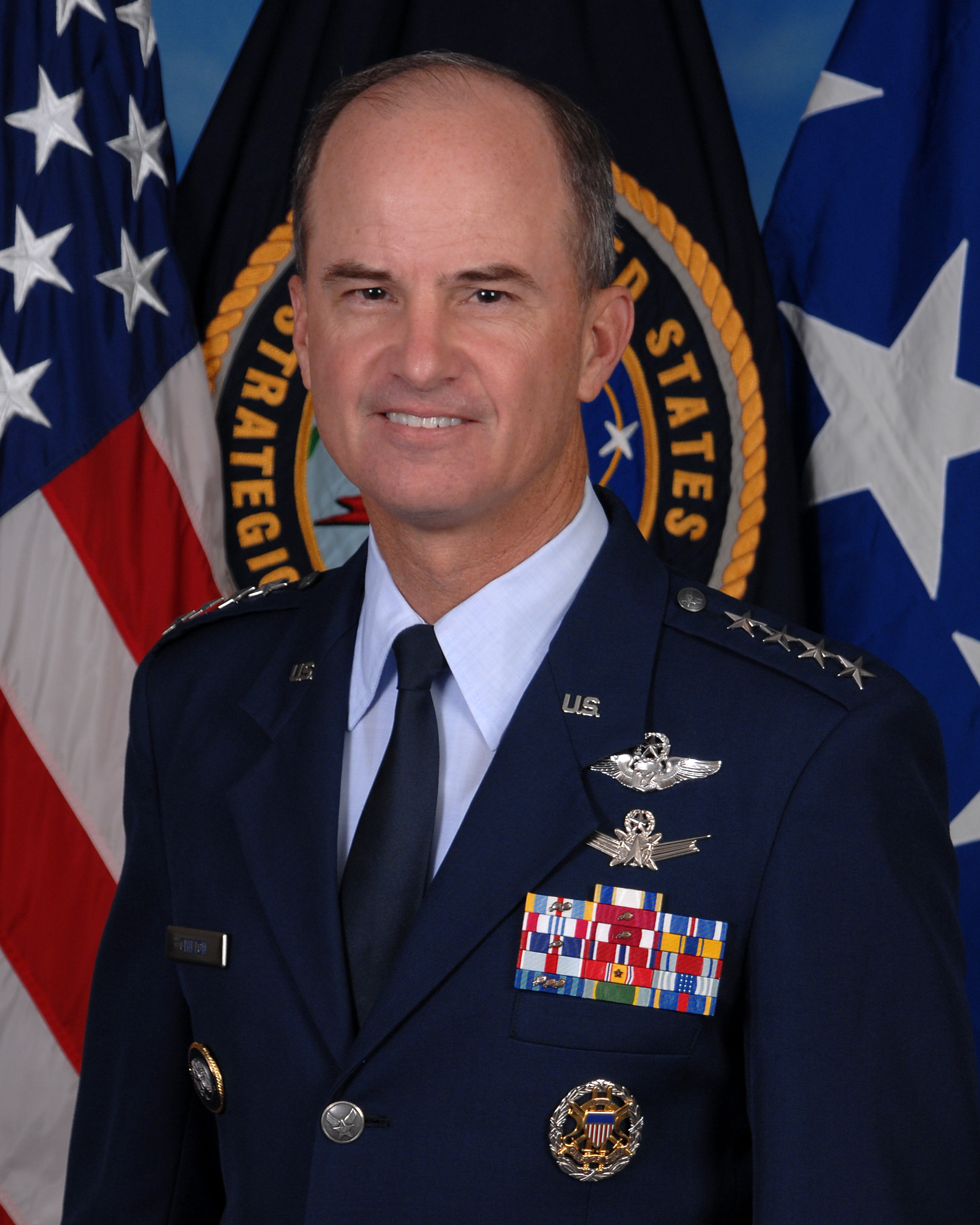
- Born: Kevin Patrick Chilton; November 3, 1954 (age 71); Los Angeles, California, U.S.
- Other name: Chilli
- Education: United States Air Force Academy (BS); Columbia University (MS)
- Space career

NASA astronaut
- Rank: General, USAF
- Time in space: 29d 8h 22m
- Selection: NASA Group 12 (1987)
- Missions: STS-49; STS-59; STS-76
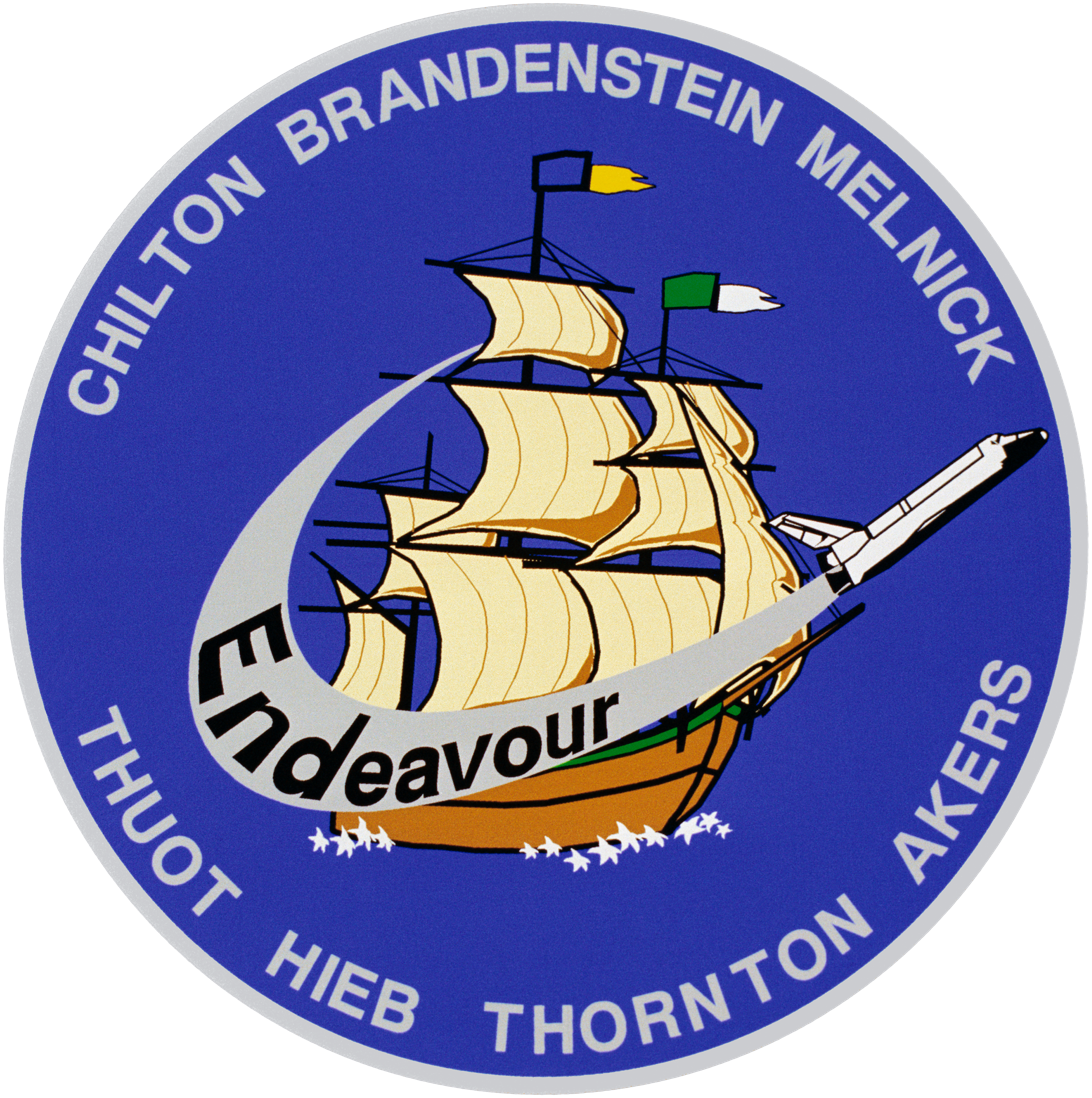
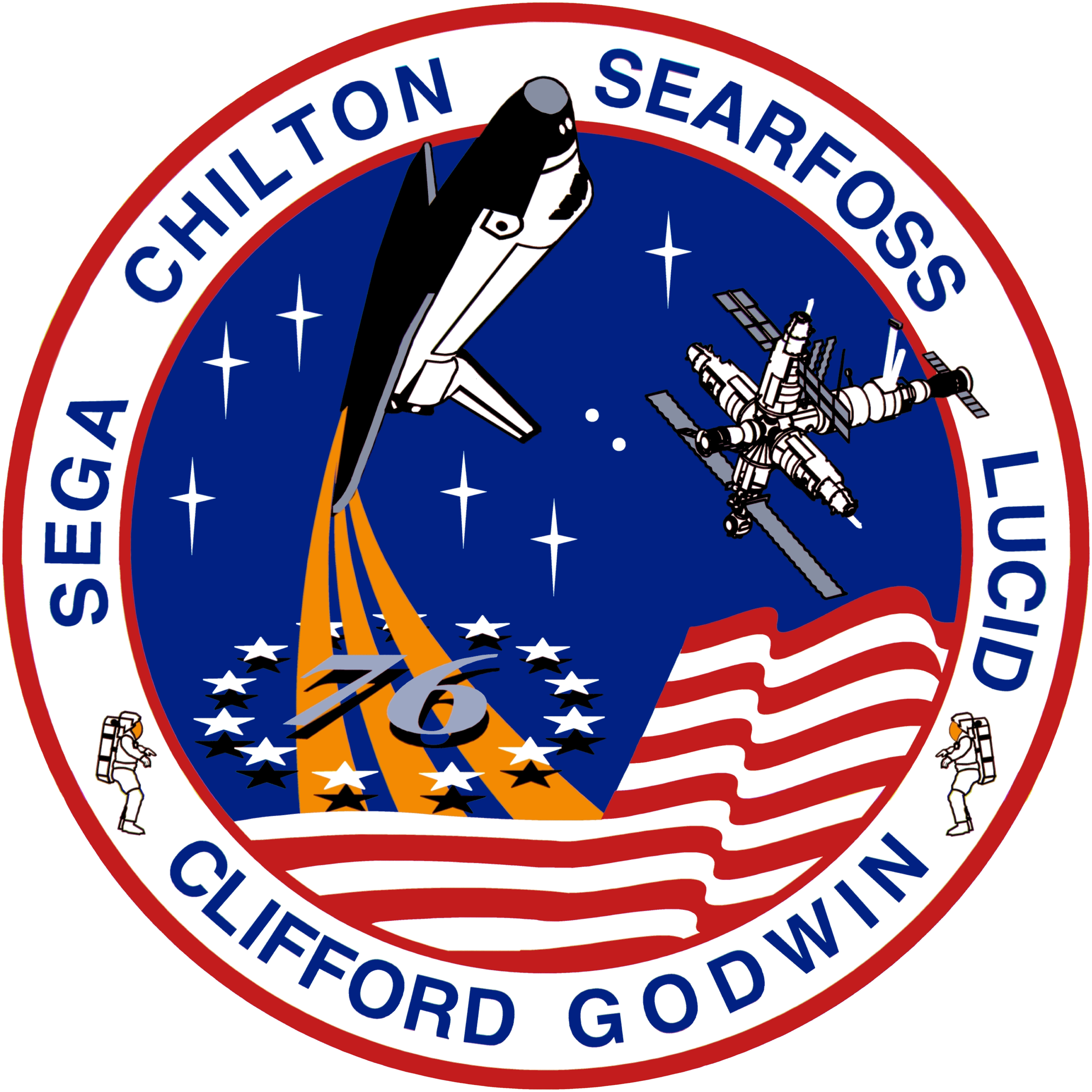
- Mission insignia
- Retired: February 1, 2011

Kevin Patrick "Chilli" Chilton (born November 3, 1954) is an American mechanical engineer and retired United States Air Force four-star general, test pilot, and NASA astronaut. His last assignment was as commander of U.S. Strategic Command from October 3, 2007, to January 28, 2011. Prior to his appointment to general officer ranks, Chilton spent 11 years of his military career as a NASA astronaut. He retired from the Air Force on February 1, 2011, after having achieved the highest rank of any military astronaut. On January 30, 2012, General Chilton was named to the board of directors of Orbital Sciences Corporation.

== Early life ==
Born November 3, 1954, in Los Angeles, California, he graduated from St. Bernard High School in Playa del Rey, California, in 1972. He received a Bachelor of Science degree in engineering sciences from the United States Air Force Academy in 1976, and a Master of Science degree in mechanical engineering from Columbia University on a Guggenheim Fellowship in 1977. He enjoys reading and all sports, including running, snow skiing, sailing, and softball.

== Early Air Force career ==
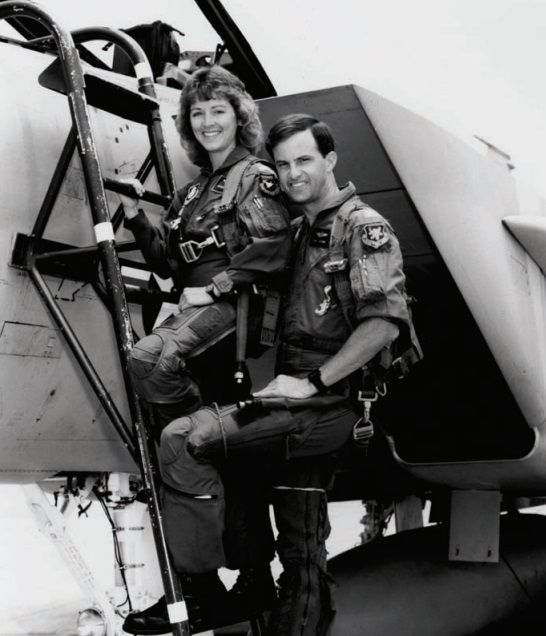
Kevin Chilton with his wife Cathy Chilton during a test pilot training on F-15 at Edwards Air Force Base, California, in 1987.

Chilton received his commission from the U.S. Air Force Academy in 1976. After receiving his pilot wings at Williams Air Force Base, Arizona, in 1978, he qualified in the RF-4C Phantom II and was assigned to the 15th Tactical Reconnaissance Squadron at Kadena Air Base, Japan. From 1978 until 1980, he served as a combat-ready pilot and instructor pilot in the RF-4C in Korea, Japan and the Philippines.

In 1981, he converted to the F-15 Eagle and was assigned to the 67th Tactical Fighter Squadron at Kadena Air Base, as a squadron pilot. In 1982, Chilton attended the USAF Squadron Officer School at Maxwell Air Force Base, Alabama, and finished as the number one graduate for the year, receiving the Secretary of the Air Force Leadership Award.

Subsequently, assigned to the 9th and 7th Tactical Fighter Squadrons at Holloman AFB, New Mexico, Chilton served as an F-15 squadron weapons officer, instructor pilot, and flight commander until 1984 when selected for the U.S. Air Force Test Pilot School. He graduated number one in his class to win the Liethen-Tittle Award, as the outstanding test pilot at the school.

Chilton was assigned to Eglin Air Force Base, Florida, where he conducted weapons and systems tests in all models of the F-15 and F-4 aircraft. While a member of the 3247th Test Squadron, Chilton served as squadron safety officer, as chief of test and evaluation, and as squadron operations officer.

During his time at the Air Force, Chilton also met his future wife, Cathy Chilton, who later became an Air Force Major General. Together, they had four children.

== NASA career ==
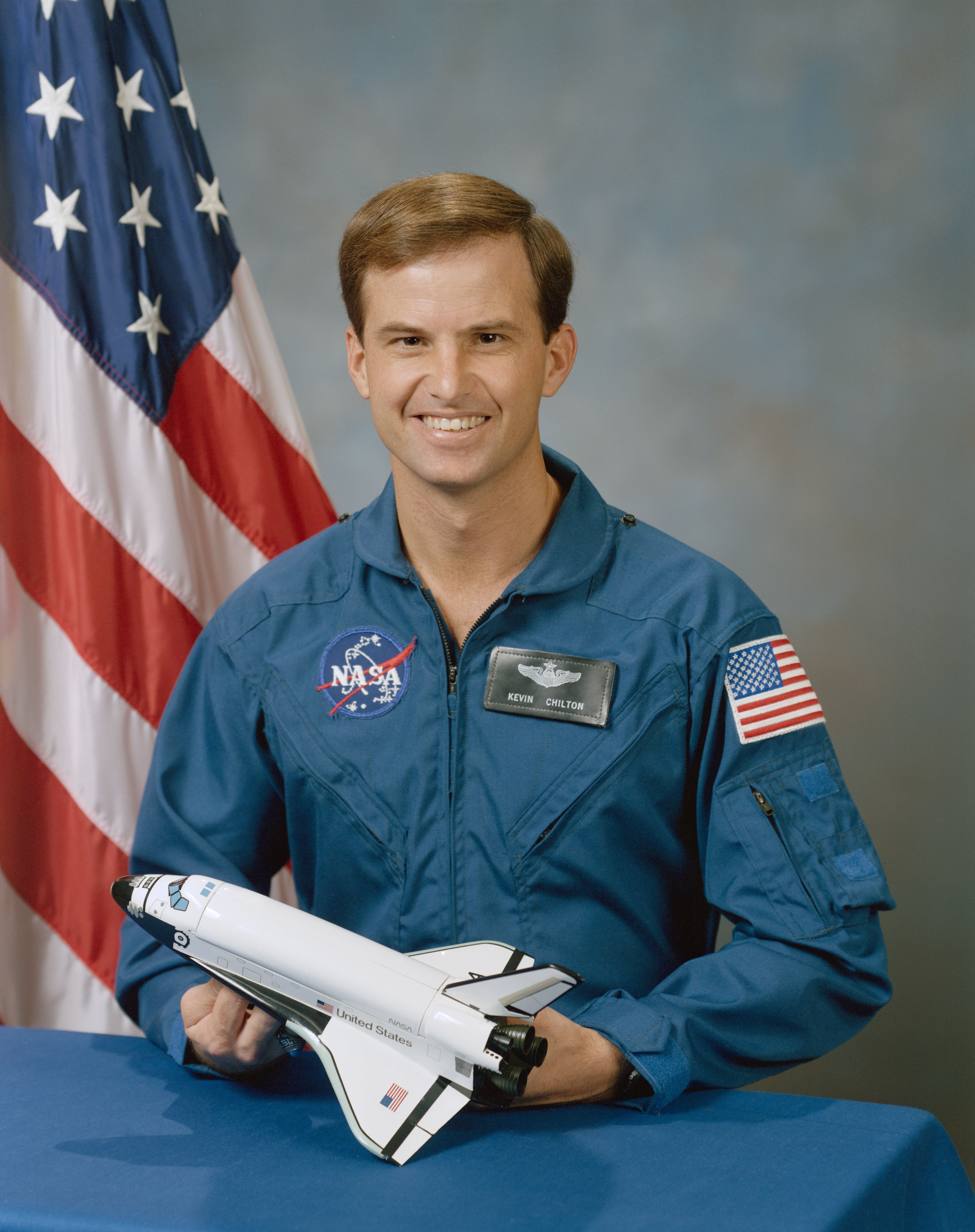
Kevin P. Chilton during his career on NASA in 1987

In August 1987 Chilton was assigned to NASA and became an astronaut in August 1988, qualifying for assignment as a pilot on Space Shuttle flight crews.

Chilton held a variety of technical assignments. He served in the Mission Development Branch of the Astronaut Office in support of the Infrared Background Signature Survey (IBSS) satellite, and the Orbital Maneuvering Vehicle (OMV) programs. He was the Astronaut Office T-38 Talon safety officer, leader of the Astronaut Support Personnel team at the Kennedy Space Center, and was lead spacecraft communicator (CAPCOM) for numerous Shuttle flights.

Chilton also served as Deputy Program Manager for the early International Space Station program. A veteran of three space flights, Chilton logged more than 704 hours in space.

An accomplished guitarist, Chilton spent a portion of his spare time hammering out riffs on a Fender Stratocaster while jamming with the all astronaut band, "Max Q".

== Spaceflight experience ==
=== STS-49 ===
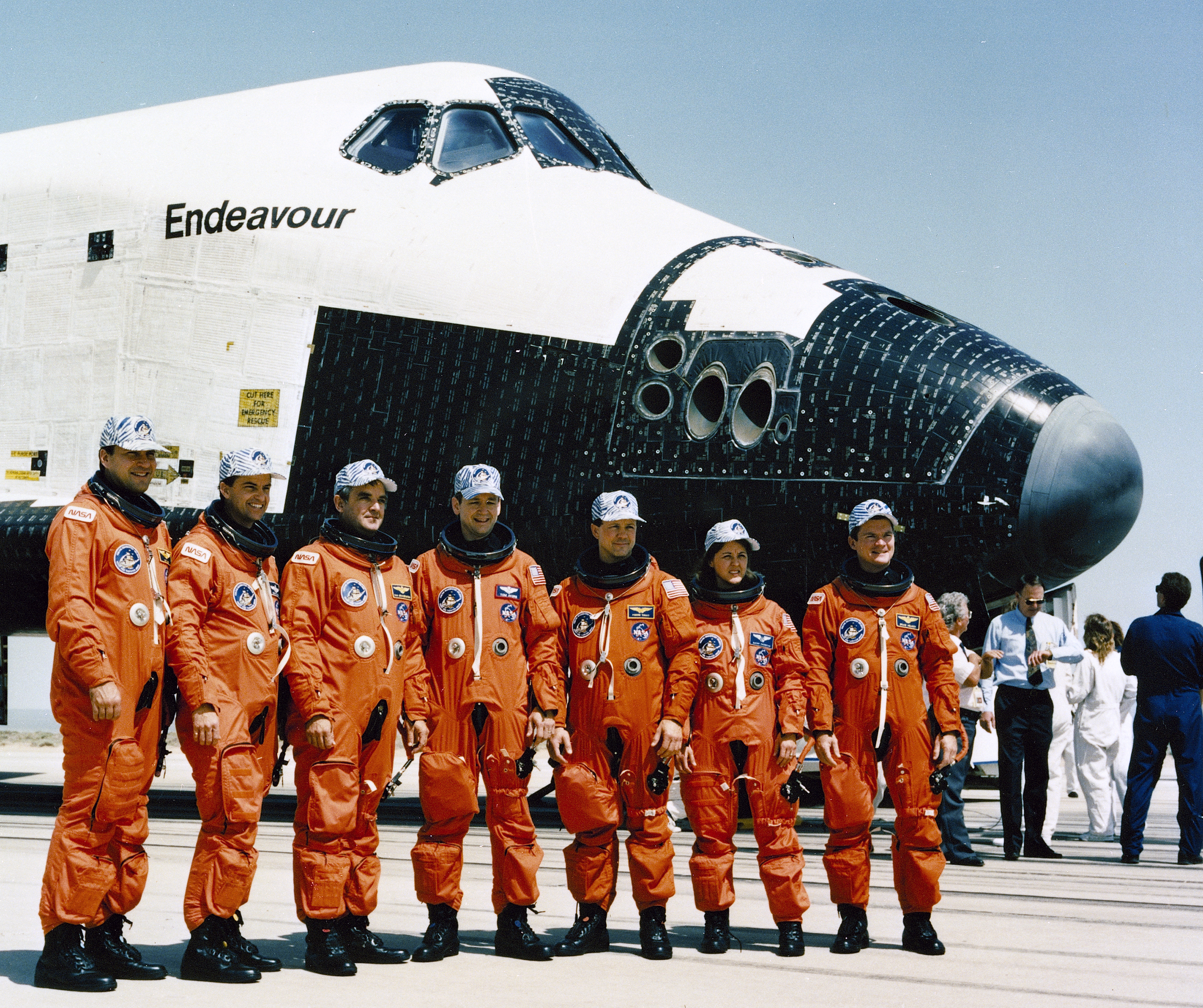
Chilton, standing second from left, with his STS-49 crewmates

STS-49, which lasted from May 7–16, 1992, was the maiden voyage of Space Shuttle Endeavour. During the mission, the crew conducted the initial test flight of Endeavour, performed a record four EVA’s (spacewalks) to retrieve, repair and deploy the International Telecommunications Satellite (Intelsat), and to demonstrate and evaluate numerous EVA tasks to be used for the assembly of Space Station Freedom. Additionally, a variety of medical, scientific and operational tests were conducted throughout the mission. STS-49 logged 213 hours in space and 141 Earth orbits prior to landing at Edwards Air Force Base, California, where the crew conducted the first test of the Endeavour’s drag chute.

=== STS-59 ===
STS-59, the Space Radar Laboratory (SRL) mission, April 9–20, 1994, was launched aboard Space Shuttle Endeavour. SRL consisted of three large radars, SIR-C/X-SAR (Shuttle Imaging Radar C/X-Band Synthetic Aperture Radar), and a carbon monoxide sensor that were used to enhance studies of the Earth's surface and atmosphere. The imaging radars operated in three frequencies and four polarizations. This multispectral capability of the radars provided information about the Earth's surface over a wide range of scales not discernible with previous single-frequency experiments. The carbon monoxide sensor (MAPS) used gas filter radiometry to measure the global distribution of CO in the troposphere. Real-time crew observations of surface phenomena and climatic conditions augmented with over 14,000 photographs aided investigators in interpretation and calibration of the data. The mission concluded with a landing at Edwards AFB after orbiting the Earth 183 times in 269 hours.

=== STS-76 ===
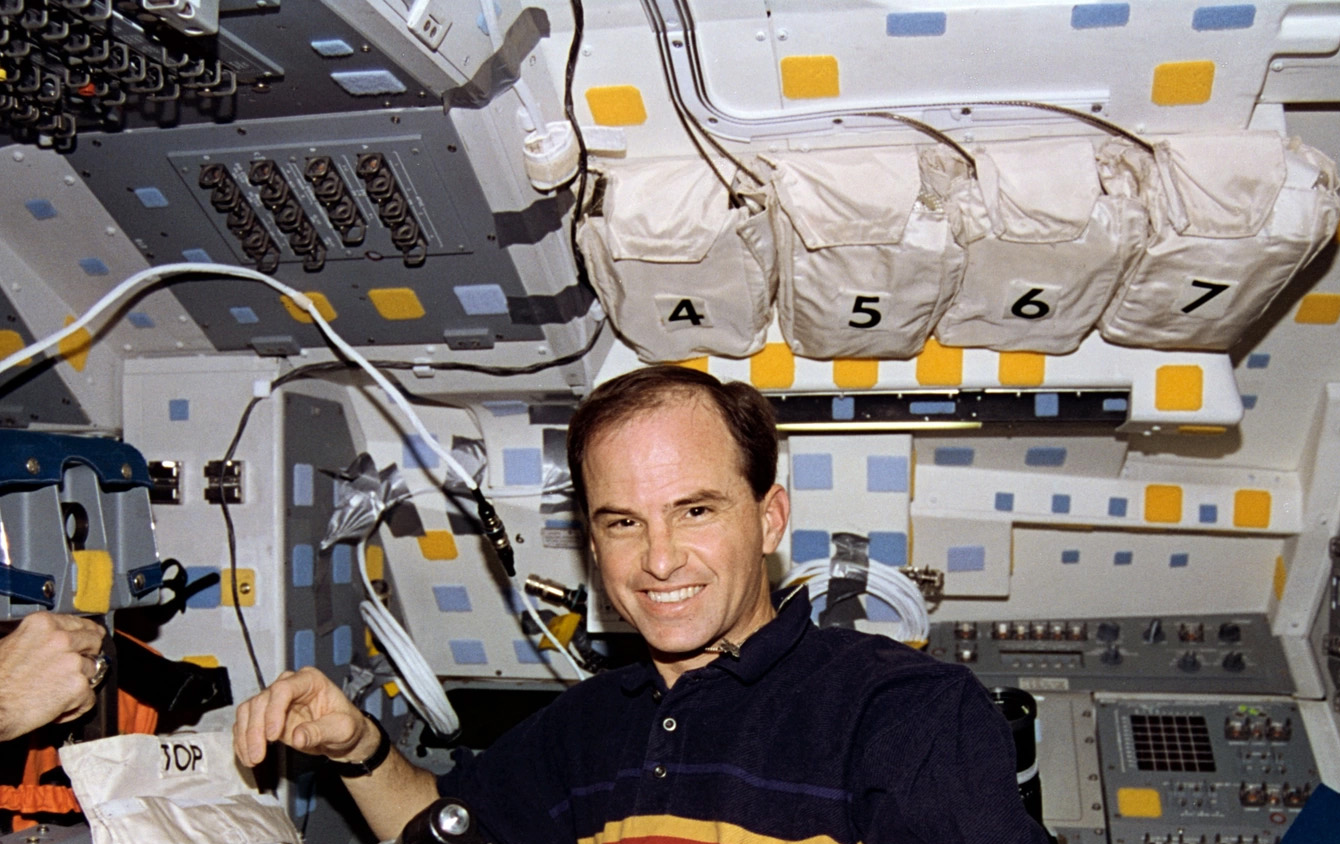
Astronaut Kevin P. Chilton on the deck of Space Shuttle Atlantis during the STS-76 missions. Chilton was the commander of the STS-76 mission.

Chilton commanded STS-76, the third docking mission to the Russian space station Mir, which launched on March 22, 1996, with a crew of six aboard Atlantis. Following rendezvous and docking with Mir, transfer of a NASA astronaut to Mir for a five-month stay was accomplished to begin a continuous presence of U.S. astronauts aboard Mir for the next two-year period. The crew also transferred 4800 pounds of science and mission hardware, food, water and air to Mir and returned over 1100 pounds of U.S. and ESA science and Russian hardware. The first spacewalk from the Shuttle while docked to Mir was conducted. Experiment packages were transferred from the Shuttle and mounted on the Mir docking module to detect and assess debris and contamination in a space station environment. The Spacehab module carried in the Shuttle payload bay was utilized extensively for transfer and return stowage of logistics and science and also carried Biorack, a small multipurpose laboratory used during this mission for research of plant and animal cellular function. This mission was also the first flight of Kidsat, an electronic camera controlled by classroom students via a Ku-band link between JSC Mission Control and the Shuttle, which used digitized photography from the Shuttle for science and education. Following 145 orbits of the Earth, Atlantis landed with a crew of five at Edwards Air Force Base in California on March 31, 1996, 221 hours after liftoff.

== Air Force career resumed ==
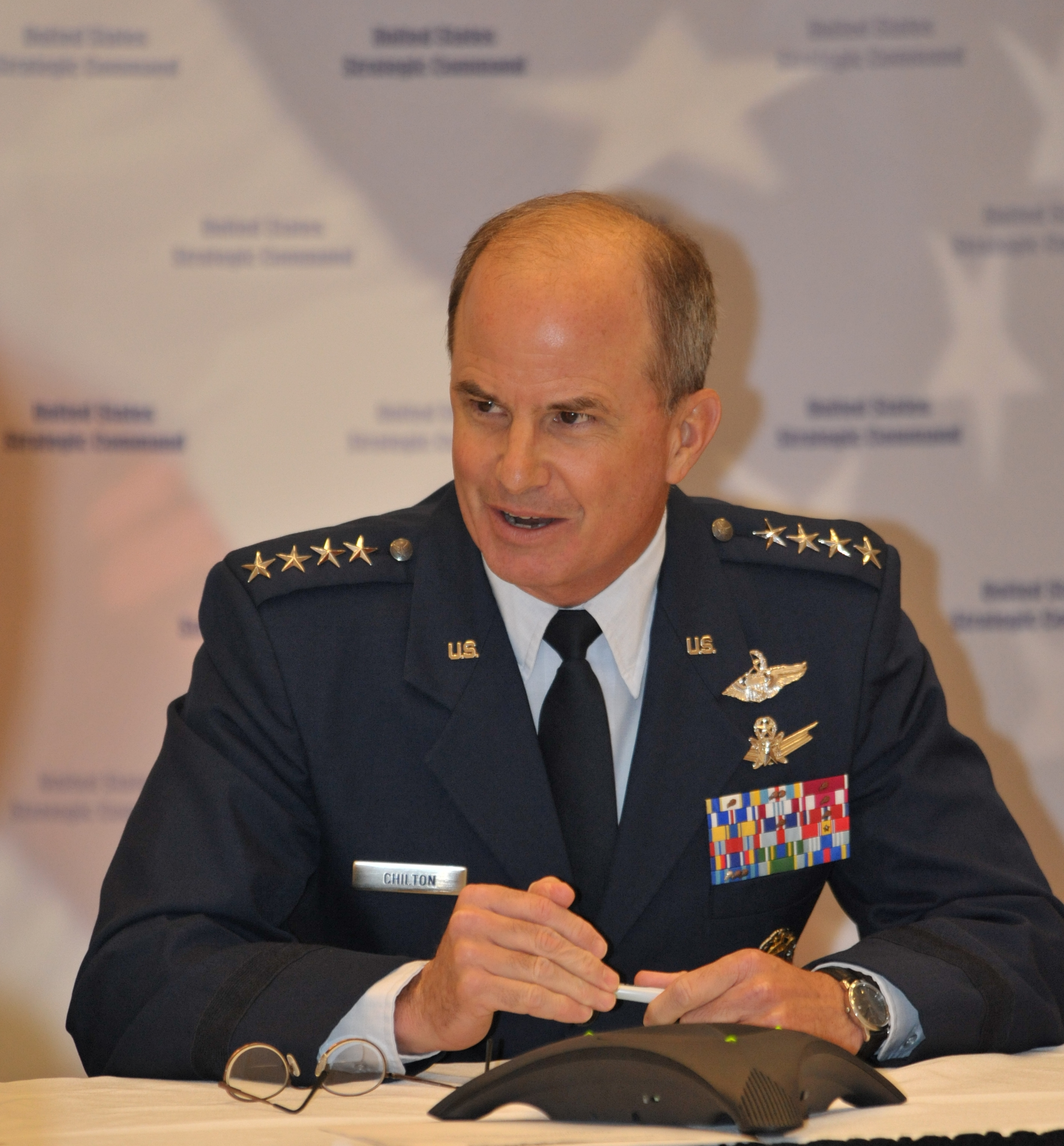
General Kevin P. Chilton in 2007

Chilton left NASA in 1998 to become deputy director of political military affairs for Asia, Pacific, and the Middle East on the Joint Staff. His first military command was the 9th Reconnaissance Wing (9 RW) at Beale AFB, California, from May 1999 to September 2000. In August 2004, Chilton assumed the dual duties of commander of the Eighth Air Force (8 AF) and commander of Joint Functional Component Command for Space and Global Strike (JFCC SGS) at Barksdale AFB, Louisiana. In April 2006, Chilton was nominated to become the commander of the Air Force Space Command (AFSPC) at Peterson AFB, Colorado. On June 26, 2006, he received his fourth star and assumed command of Air Force Space Command. General Chilton is the only former astronaut to achieve four-star grade. Lieutenant General Tom Stafford, Vice Admiral Dick Truly and Lieutenant General Susan Helms have attained the rank of three stars.

As commander of Air Force Space Command, Chilton oversees the whole space operations within the United States Air Force jurisdiction including the Satellites and Ballistic Missile. With his background as astronaut, Chilton also emphasized the importance roles of Space operations especially entering the new communication technologies systems in-which satellite communication played major role in a modern communication technologies that needed a robust satellite communication systems. Chilton also emphasized the importance role of satellites which will act as eyes for troops, especially those deployed abroad. However Chilton did not remain long as commander of Air Force Space Command, following Chilton's nomination as commander of United States Strategic Command in October 2007.

== Commander of United States Strategic Command ==
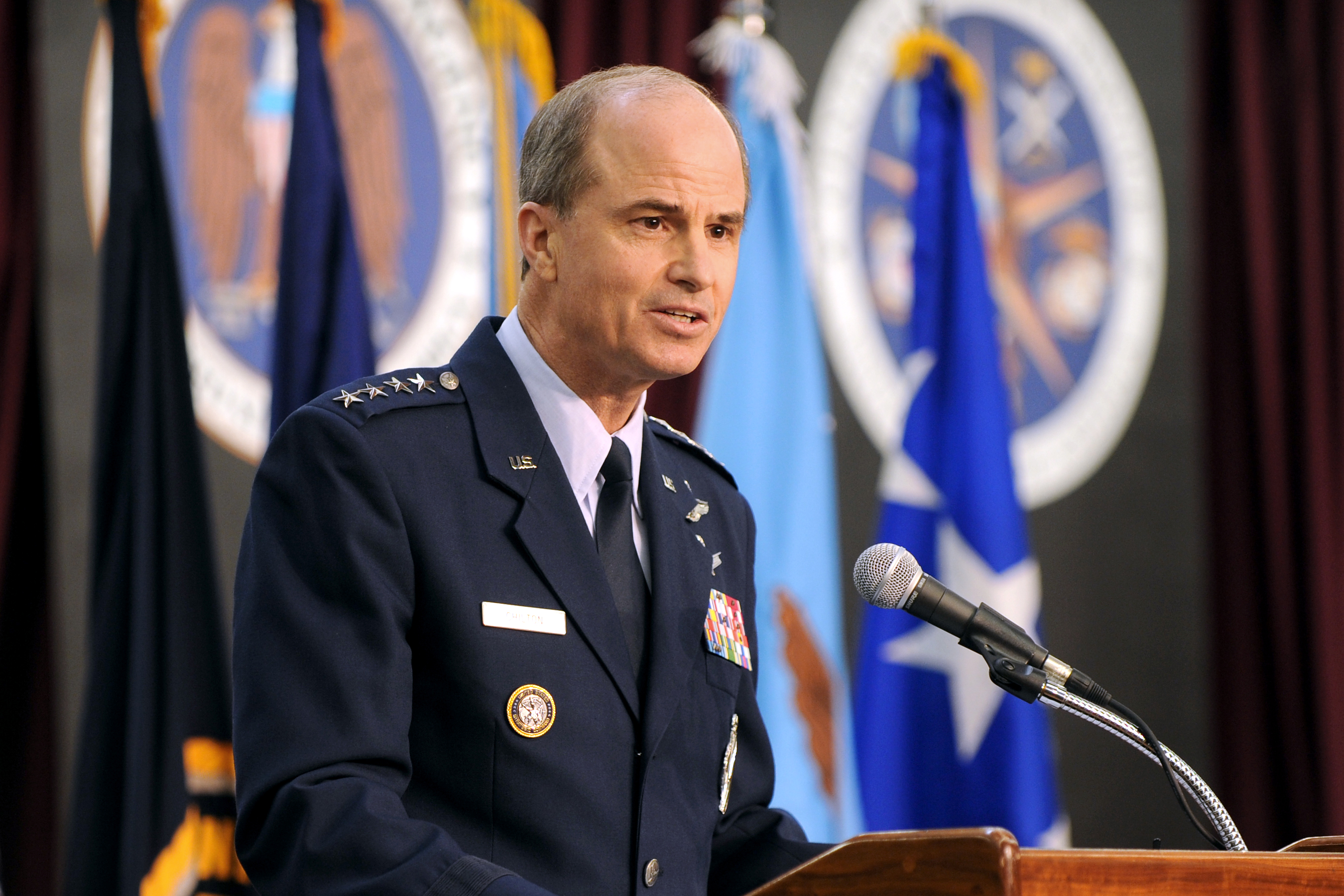
Commander of the United States Strategic Command General Kevin P. Chilton.

In October 2007, following the appointment of Commander of Strategic Command General James E. Cartwright as Vice Chairman of the Joint Chiefs of Staff, Secretary of Defense Robert Gates appointed Chilton to succeed Cartwright as the new commander of United States Strategic Command. Chilton nomination as commander of United States Strategic Command was confirmed by the United States Senate on September 28, 2007. Chilton then assumed command of the United States Strategic Command on October 3, 2007, his last assignment before retiring following a handover command ceremony that was held at United States Strategic Command headquarters at Offutt Air Force Base, Nebraska, with Secretary of Defense Robert Gates delivered the ceremony remarks. In this Capacity Chilton oversees the whole United States Nuclear arsenal and the Nuclear Triad. Chilton also responsible with the primary Strategic Deterrence mission which its purpose is to anticipate an incoming Nuclear-Strike towards the United States. In the case of Strategic Deterrence, Chilton emphasized the incoming dangers of United States primary adversary that has Nuclear arsenal such as North Korea. Chilton reaffirm that such threat from United States primary adversaries that own Nuclear arsenal is a clear and present danger. During Chilton Tenure as Commander of Strategic Command, Chilton also modernize Nuclear Missile arsenal such as modernizing the B61 nuclear bomb and its vacuum tubes.

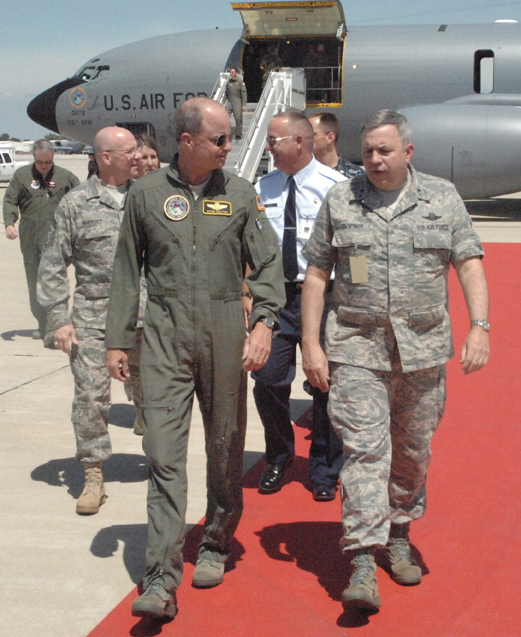
General Kevin P. Chilton visiting Grissom Air Reserve Base during his tenure as commander of The Strategic Command, June 27, 2009.

Chilton also emphasized the importance role of the United States Cyber division which also took part in guarding the Strategic Deterrence, especially following the 2008 cyberattacks on United States which almost infiltrated the military network. The attack led to the initiation of Operation Buckshot Yankee that led to the cleaning of the infection worm virus. In the previous part the command of Cyber was under the unit called the Joint Task Force – Computer Network Defense which also known as JTF-CND which was created following a series of thorny cyber incidents on Department of Defense. However the JTF-CND was seen to be obsolete, especially entering the new decade on-which cyber played major role especially in-order to deterred Cyber attacks that has tremendous effect especially towards the Nuclear Arsenal security system and Chilton emphasize the need of a new Cyber division that could deterred and prevent the incoming and dangerous cyber attacks. As a result, on 2010, the Department of Defense and the Obama Administration agreed to create a new Functional Unified Combatant Command that primarily task on Cyber division and in May 2010 the United States Cyber Command was officially formed as the new Unified Combatant Command. During Chilton's tenure as commander of Strategic Command, Chilton also re-affirmed about the new incoming space race with China, especially following China test of anti-satellite missile in 2007. According to Chilton China is on a fast track to improve their space capabilities and eager to have domination on the space race. In 2009 Chilton also testified about the importance roles of Nuclear arsenals following a speculation of President Obama's vision of a nuclear-free world. Chilton also emphasized that the Nuclear Triads and its arsenal are still needed 40 years from now. Chilton's tenure as commander of United States Strategic Command ended in January 2011, following his four years assuming the position. Chilton was succeeded by C. Robert Kehler who previously held the position of commander of Air Force Space Command and also succeeding Chilton in the position. Following his ended assignment as commander of Strategic Command, Chilton officially retired from the United States Air Force in January 2011 after 34 years of dedicated service and leadership within the United States Air Force.

== Education ==
- 1976 Distinguished graduate, Bachelor of Science degree in engineering sciences, United States Air Force Academy, Colorado Springs, Colorado
- 1977 Master of Science degree in mechanical engineering, Columbia University, New York City
- 1982 Distinguished graduate, Squadron Officer School, Maxwell Air Force Base, Alabama
- 1984 Distinguished graduate, U.S. Air Force Test Pilot School, Edwards Air Force Base, California
- 1985 Air Command and Staff College, by correspondence
- 2001 Air War College, by correspondence

== Military assignments ==
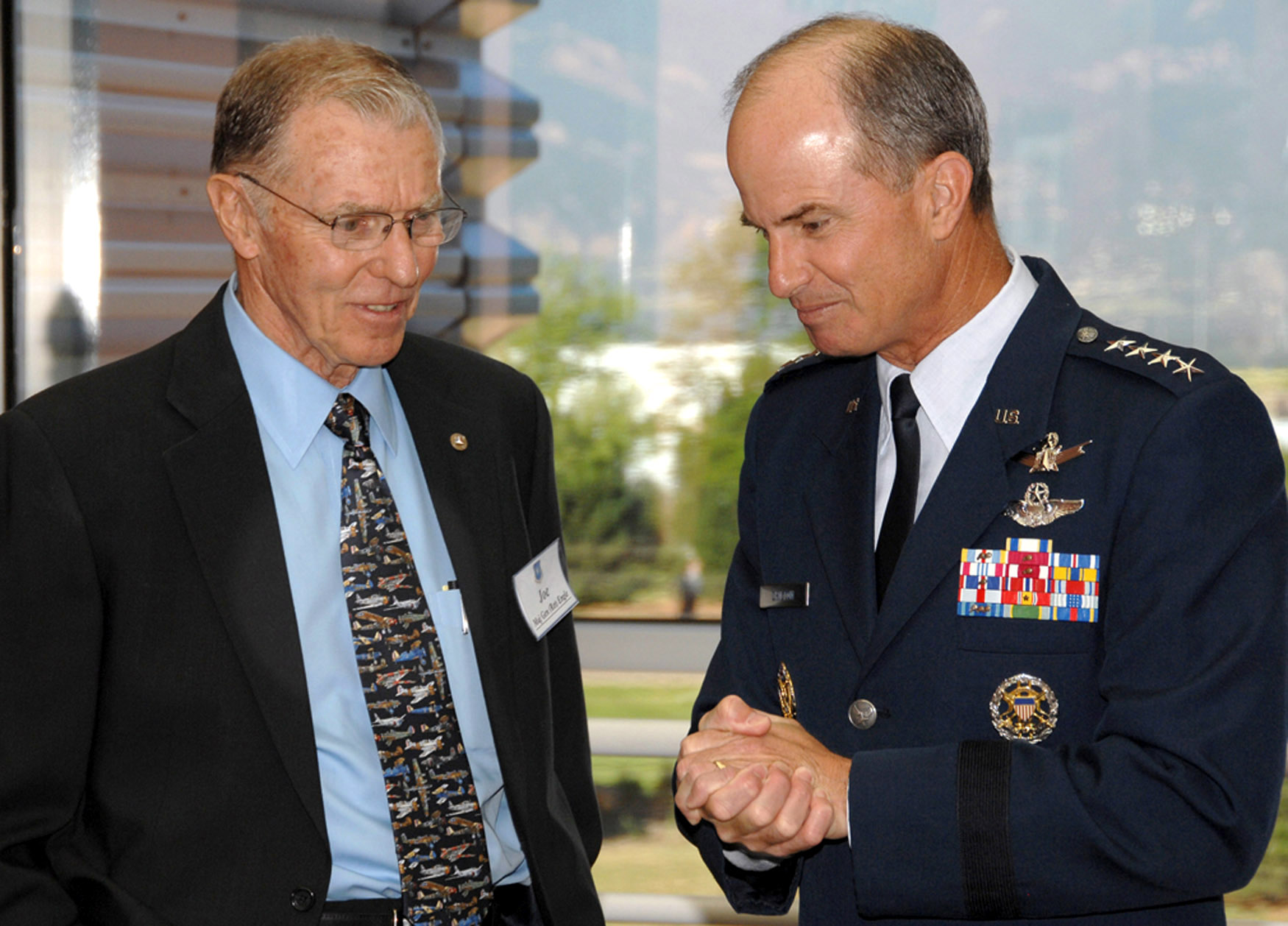
General Chilton with fellow astronaut Major General Joe Engle

- May 1977 – May 1978, student, undergraduate pilot training, Williams Air Force Base, Arizona
- May 1978 – August 1978, student, RF-4C Replacement Training Unit, Shaw Air Force Base, South Carolina
- August 1978 – November 1980, RF-4C pilot and instructor pilot, 15th Tactical Reconnaissance Squadron, Kadena Air Base, Japan
- November 1980 – August 1982, F-15C pilot, 67th Tactical Fighter Squadron, Kadena Air Base, Japan
- August 1982 – October 1982, student, Squadron Officer School, Maxwell Air Force Base, Alabama
- October 1982 – December 1983, F-15A pilot, instructor pilot and flight commander, 9th and 7th Tactical Fighter Squadrons, Holloman Air Force Base, New Mexico
- January 1984 – December 1984, student, U.S. Air Force Test Pilot School, Edwards Air Force Base, California
- January 1985 – August 1987, test pilot and operations officer, 3247th Test Squadron, Eglin Air Force Base, Florida
- August 1987 – August 1988, astronaut candidate, NASA, Lyndon B. Johnson Space Center, Houston, Texas
- August 1988 – May 1996, astronaut, NASA, Lyndon B. Johnson Space Center, Houston, Texas
- May 1996 – August 1998, deputy program manager of operations, International Space Station Program, NASA, Lyndon B. Johnson Space Center, Houston, Texas
- August 1998 – May 1999, deputy director of operations, Headquarters Air Force Space Command, Peterson Air Force Base, Colorado
- May 1999 – September 2000, commander, 9th Reconnaissance Wing, Beale Air Force Base, California
- October 2000 – April 2002, director of politico-military affairs, Asia-Pacific and Middle East, Joint Staff, The Pentagon, Washington, D.C.
- April 2002 – August 2004, director of programs, deputy chief of staff for plans and programs, Headquarters U.S. Air Force, Washington, D.C.
- August 2004 – August 2005, acting assistant vice chief of staff, Headquarters U.S. Air Force, Washington, D.C.
- August 2005 – June 2006, commander of 8th Air Force, Barksdale Air Force Base, Louisiana, and joint functional component commander for space and global strike, United States Strategic Command, Offutt Air Force Base, Nebraska
- June 2006 – September 2007, commander of Air Force Space Command, Peterson Air Force Base, Colorado
- October 2007 – January 2011, commander of U.S. Strategic Command, Offutt Air Force Base, Nebraska

=== Summary of joint assignments ===
- October 2000 – April 2002, director of politico-military affairs, Asia-Pacific and Middle East, Joint Staff, The Pentagon, Washington, D.C., as a Brigadier General and Major General
- October 2007 – January 2011, commander of U.S. Strategic Command, Offutt Air Force Base, Nebraska, as a General

== Flight information ==
- Rating: Command astronaut pilot
- Flight hours: More than 5,000
- Aircraft flown: F-4C/D/E, F-15A/B/C/D, OV-104A and OV-105A (space shuttles Atlantis and Endeavour), RF-4C, T-38, U-2 and VC-11, B-52H

== Organizations ==
Chilton is a member of the Order of Daedalians, USAF Academy Association of Graduates, and American Legion.

== Awards and decorations ==
Personal decorations
	Defense Distinguished Service Medal
	Air Force Distinguished Service Medal with oak leaf cluster
	Defense Superior Service Medal with two oak leaf clusters
Width-44 crimson ribbon with a pair of width-2 white stripes on the edges	Legion of Merit with oak leaf cluster
	Distinguished Flying Cross
	Defense Meritorious Service Medal
	Meritorious Service Medal with oak leaf cluster
	Air Force Commendation Medal
Unit awards
	Joint Meritorious Unit Award
	Outstanding Unit Award with oak leaf cluster
	Organizational Excellence Award with oak leaf cluster
NASA awards
	NASA Outstanding Leadership Medal
	NASA Exceptional Service Medal
	NASA Space Flight Medal with two oak leaf clusters
Service awards
	Combat Readiness Medal
	Air Force Recognition Ribbon
Campaign and service medals
	National Defense Service Medal with service star
	Global War on Terrorism Service Medal
	Korea Defense Service Medal
Service, training, and marksmanship awards
	Air Force Overseas Long Tour Service Ribbon
	Air Force Longevity Service Award with silver and three bronze oak leaf clusters
	Small Arms Expert Marksmanship Ribbon
	Air Force Training Ribbon

USAF Badges
Command Pilot Badge with Astronaut Device
Command Space Badge
Command Missile Operations Badge
Office of the Joint Chiefs of Staff Identification Badge
United States Strategic Command Badge

=== Other achievements ===
- National Space Trophy
- NASA "Top Fox" Flight Safety Award
- Guggenheim Fellow
- Commander's Trophy, Undergraduate Pilot Training
- 1982 Secretary of the Air Force Leadership Award
- 1984 Liethen-Tittle Award for top graduate, U.S. Air Force Test Pilot School
- 2012 Induction into the United States Astronaut Hall of Fame on May 5th in a ceremony that took place at the Kennedy Space Center Visitor Complex

== Effective dates of promotion ==
Promotions
Insignia	Rank	Date
	General	June 26, 2006
	Lieutenant general	August 9, 2005
	Major general	April 1, 2002
	Brigadier general	May 1, 1999
	Colonel	January 1, 1993
	Lieutenant colonel	June 2, 1989
	Major	May 2, 1985
	Captain	June 2, 1980
	First lieutenant	June 2, 1978
	Second lieutenant	June 2, 1976

== See also ==
- United States Strategic Command
- Eighth Air Force

Military offices
Preceded by James Cartwright	Commander, United States Strategic Command; 2007–2011	Succeeded by C. Robert Kehler
