= Michael J. Connor =

U.S Navy vice admiral (born 1961)

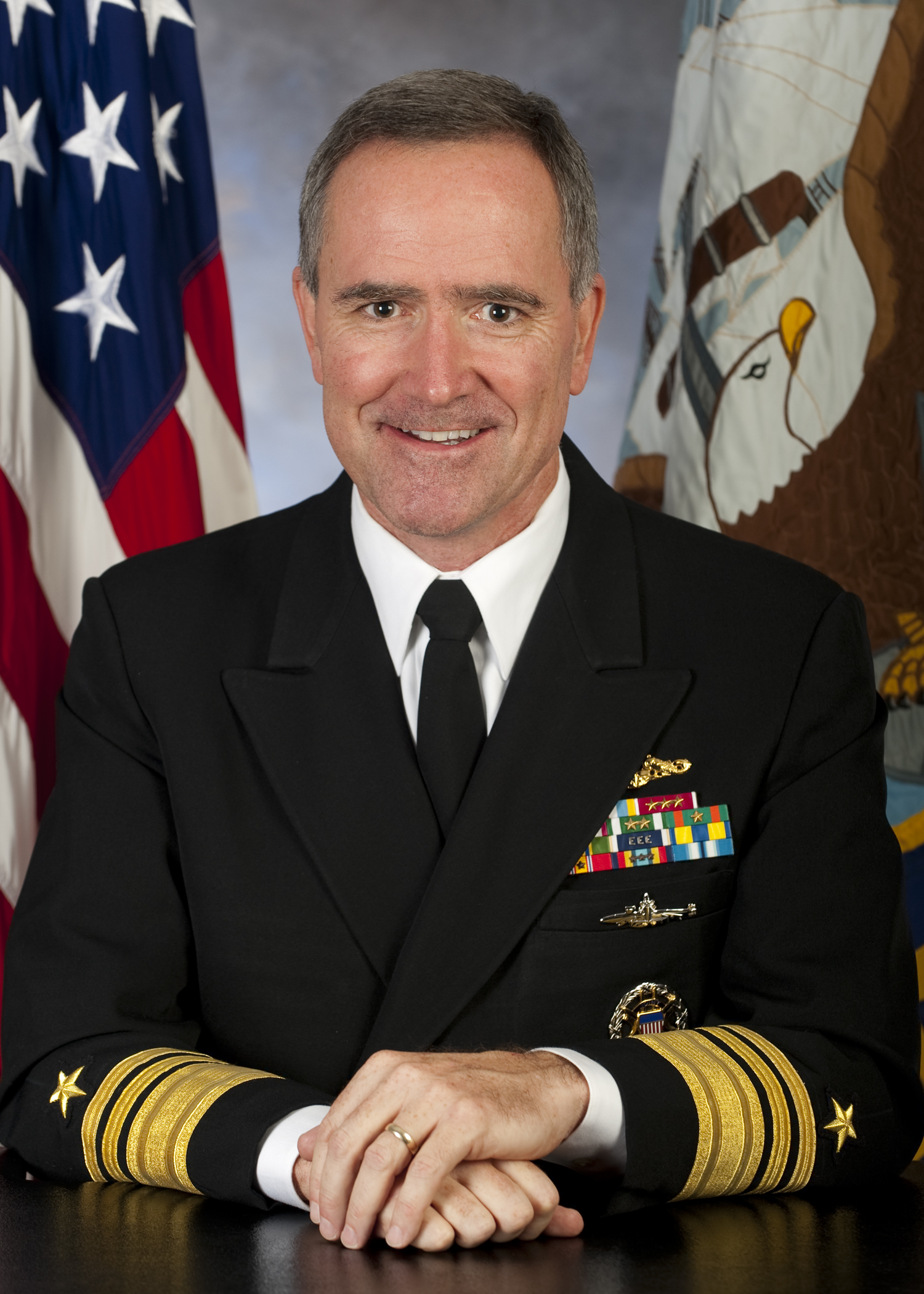
- Born: January 19, 1961 (age 65); Denver, Colorado, United States
- Military career
- Branch: United States Navy
- Rank: Vice Admiral
- Awards: Navy Distinguished Service Medal; Defense Superior Service Medal; Legion of Merit; Meritorious Service Medal; Navy and Marine Corps Commendation Medal; Navy and Marine Corps Achievement Medal

Michael J. Connor, (born January 19, 1961) is a retired United States Navy Vice Admiral. Connor held several, concurrent titles during his last assignment including Commander, United States Submarine Forces (COMNAVSUBFOR), Commander, Submarine Forces Atlantic (COMSUBLANT) and Commander, Allied Submarine Command. Connor served as commander of the U.S. submarine forces from September 2012 until September 2015.

== Early life and education ==
Connor grew up in Weymouth, Mass., and graduated in 1980 from Bowdoin College.

== Military career ==
Connor, like all U.S. submarine officers (with the exception of supply officers and some Limited Duty Officers (LDO) and Chief Warrant Officers assigned to Ballistic Missile Submarines) attended Nuclear Power School and received submarine training. Connor has served on several U.S. Navy submarines including the USS Ulysses S. Grant (SSBN-631) as communications officer, USS Pittsburgh (SSN-720) as Damage Control Assistant, USS Providence (SSN-719) as Navigator and Operations Officer, USS Augusta (SSN-710) as Executive Officer and USS Seawolf (SSN-21) as Commanding Officer. Between serving on Augusta and commanding Seawolf, Connor worked as Flag Secretary on the staff of the Commander Submarine Force, U.S. Atlantic Fleet.

After his tour on Seawolf, Connor attended Naval War College where he earned a Master of Arts in National Security Affairs and Strategic Studies. Connor also commanded Submarine Squadron Eight from March 2003 through July 2004, and Submarine Group Seven from June 2008 until April 2010.

Admiral Connor was relieved in a change of command ceremony by Vice Admiral Joseph E. Tofalo on September 11, 2015 and retired from the Navy at that time.

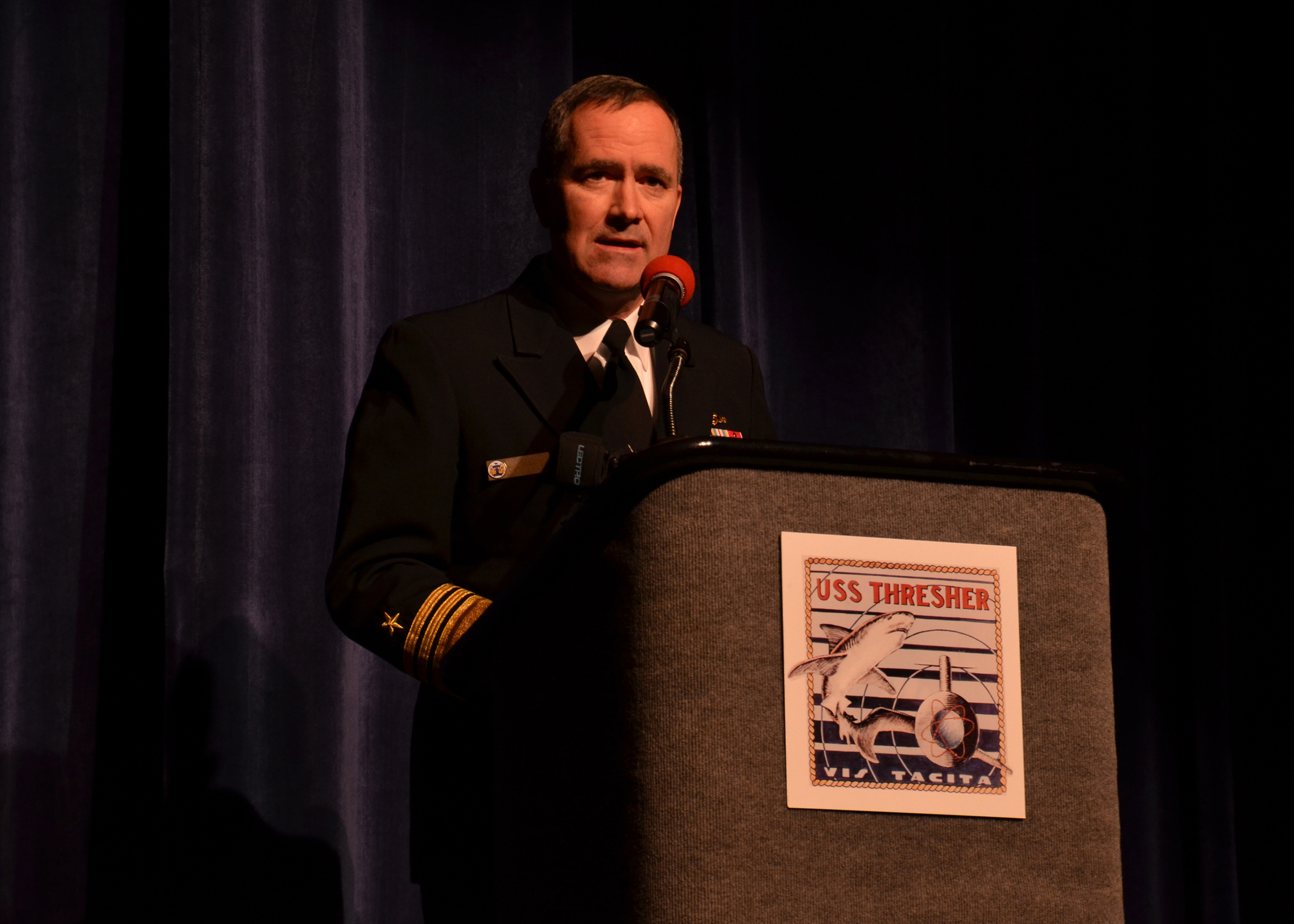
Speaking in 2013

== See also ==
- United States Fleet Forces Command
- Submarines in the United States Navy
- Virginia-class submarine
- List of submarine classes of the United States Navy

Military offices
| Preceded by John M. Richardson | ComSubLant; 2012-2015 | Succeeded by Joseph E. Tofalo |
