= AN/BLQ-11 Long-Term Mine Reconnaissance System =

American torpedo tube-launched underwater search and survey unmanned undersea vehicle

Class overview
- Name: AN/BLQ-11
- Builders: Boeing Defense, Space & Security
- Operators: United States Navy

General characteristics
- Type: Autonomous underwater vehicle
- Displacement: 2,743 pounds (1,244 kg)
- Length: 20 ft (6.1 m)
- Beam: 1 ft 9 in (0.53 m)
- Height: 1 ft 9 in (0.53 m)
- Propulsion: Thrusters
- Endurance: 60 hours (nominal load)
- Test depth: 3,300 ft (1,000 m; 550 fathoms)
- Sensors & processing systems: Forward/side-scan synthetic aperture sonar

The AN/BLQ-11 is an autonomous unmanned undersea vehicle (UUV) formerly called Long-Term Mine Reconnaissance System (LMRS). It was developed by Boeing Defense, Space & Security for the United States Navy. The LMRS is a torpedo tube-launched and tube-recovered underwater search and survey vehicle capable of autonomous naval minefield reconnaissance as much as 120 miles (190 km) in advance of its host Los Angeles-, Seawolf-, or Virginia-class submarine. LMRS is equipped with both forward-looking sonar and side-scan synthetic aperture sonar.

== History ==
Boeing concluded the detailed design phase of the development project on 31 August 1999. The USS Oklahoma City (SSN-723) successfully launched the 20-foot (6.1 m) long vehicle for covert mine countermeasures in September 2005. In January 2006 sea trials, the USS Scranton (SSN-756) conducted 24 test runs successfully demonstrating homing and docking of an LMRS UUV. In October 2007, USS Hartford (SSN-768) conducted further tests.

Due to technical and engineering limitations the U.S. Navy's Mission Reconfigurable UUV System (MRUUVS) program, of which AN/BLQ-11 was a part, ended in December 2008.
