= USS Scranton (SSN-756) =

Los Angeles-class nuclear-powered attack submarine of the US Navy

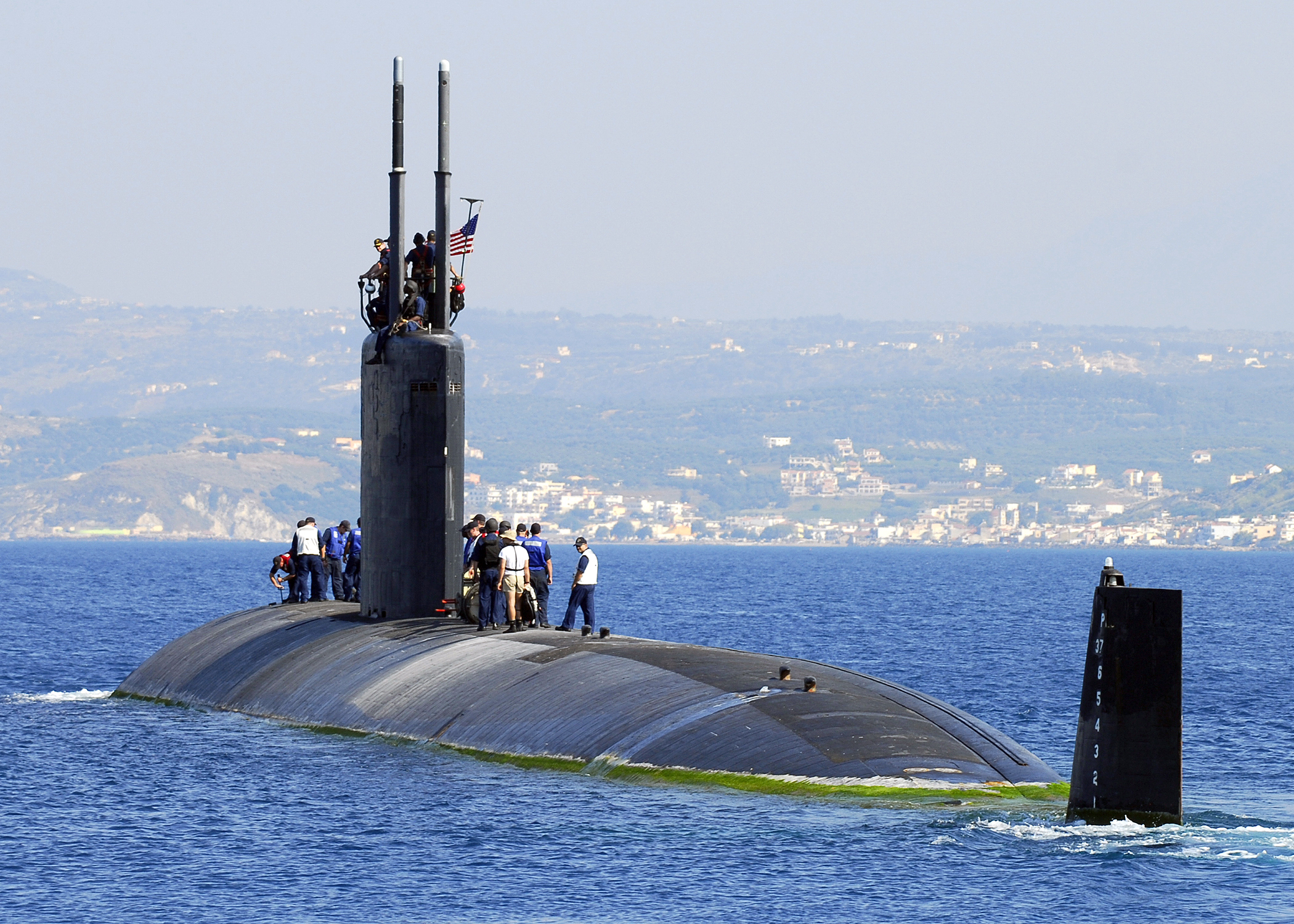
- USS Scranton (SSN-756)

History

United States
- Name: USS Scranton
- Namesake: City of Scranton, Pennsylvania
- Awarded: 26 November 1984
- Builder: Newport News Shipbuilding and Drydock Company
- Laid down: 29 August 1986
- Launched: 3 July 1989
- Sponsored by: Mrs. Sarah McDade
- Christened: 15 April 1989
- Commissioned: 26 January 1991
- Home port: Naval Base Point Loma
- Identification: MMSI number: 369970221; Callsign: NSCN
- Status: in active service
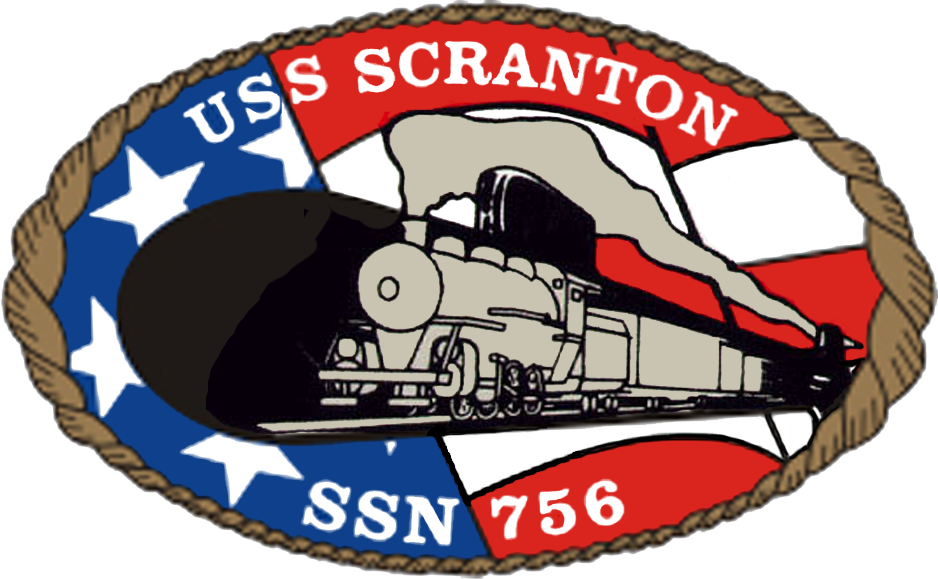
- Badge

General characteristics
- Class & type: Los Angeles-class submarine
- Displacement: 5,742 long tons (5,834 t) light; 6,145 long tons (6,244 t) full; 403 long tons (409 t) dead
- Length: 110.3 m (361 ft 11 in)
- Beam: 10 m (32 ft 10 in)
- Draft: 9.4 m (30 ft 10 in)
- Propulsion: 1 × S6G PWR nuclear reactor with D2W core (165 MW), HEU 93.5%; 2 × steam turbines (33,500) shp; 1 × shaft; 1 × secondary propulsion motor 325 hp (242 kW)
- Complement: 12 officers, 98 men
- Armament: 4 × 21 in (533 mm) bow tubes, 10 Mk48 ADCAP torpedo reloads, Tomahawk land attack missile block 3 SLCM range 1,700 nmi (3,148 km; 1,956 mi), Harpoon anti–surface ship missile range 70 nmi (130 km; 81 mi), mine laying Mk67 mobile mine & Mk60 captor mines

USS Scranton (SSN-756), a Los Angeles-class submarine, is the second ship of the United States Navy to be named for Scranton, Pennsylvania.

The contract to build her was awarded to Newport News Shipbuilding and Drydock Company in Newport News, Virginia, on 26 November 1984, and construction began on 29 August 1986. She was launched on 3 July 1989 sponsored by Mrs. Sarah McDade, and commissioned on 26 January 1991, with Commander J.G. Meyer in command.

Scranton was the first submarine at Newport News to be built via "modular construction". No keel was laid. In this method, the ship was almost fully built out in individual hull sections. Most of the internal structure, machinery, and piping were loaded in via open ends of the hull sections as each hull section was built out. The individual hull sections were later assembled with exact precision such that piping running between the sections was joined as the hull sections were welded together. The ship was later rolled into a floating drydock and "floated".

In January 2006, Scranton successfully demonstrated homing and docking of an AN/BLQ-11 Long-Term Mine Reconnaissance System (LMRS) unmanned undersea vehicle (UUV) system during at-sea testing under the leadership of Commanding Officer Michael J Quinn.

As of March 28, 2025, the USS Scranton became the custodian of the historic O'Kane cribbage board, a storied World War II artifact passed down to the oldest active fast-attack submarine in the U.S. Pacific Fleet.

== 2011 Strike Operations ==
In March 2011, USS Scranton participated in Operation Odyssey Dawn, enforcing United Nations Security Council Resolution 1973 over Libya. On the opening day of the conflict, March 19, 2011, Scranton operated alongside the fast-attack submarine USS Providence and the guided-missile submarine USS Florida, launching Tomahawk land-attack cruise missiles from the Mediterranean Sea targeting Libyan air defenses and radar networks. For outstanding heroism and precision strike capabilities during the opening wave of the operation, the crew of the Scranton was later awarded the Navy Unit Commendation.

== Awards and decorations ==
Throughout its operational deployment cycles, the submarine has established a tradition of excellence. Submarine Squadron Six awarded Scranton the Battle Efficiency "E" in 1994, 1995, and 1998. In addition to combat readiness awards, the submarine's culinary specialists have twice secured the highest honor for naval food hospitality—the Captain Edward F. Ney Memorial Award—winning the submarine enterprise division in 1995 and again in fiscal year 2020.

The ship and crew of USS Scranton have earned multiple unit distinctions and departmental citations, including:

- 'Submarine Squadron Six Battle Efficiency "E": 1994, 1995, and 1998
- Navy Unit Commendation: Awarded to the crew for heroic operational achievements during Operation Odyssey Dawn (2011)
- Meritorious Unit Commendation: 1993
- Captain Edward F. Ney Memorial Award (Submarine Category): Winner in 1995 and 2020 for overall food service excellence across the Navy's undersea enterprise.
- Sixth Fleet "Hook 'Em" ASW Award: 1993
- Submarine Force Nominee for the Battenberg Cup: 1995
- Submarine Squadron Six Departmental Awards: Supply Blue "E" (1993, 1995, 1997); Engineering Red "E" (1995, 1997); Damage Control Red "DC" (1992, 1997); Communications Green "C" (1994)
