= Joint Functional Component Command for Global Strike =

The Joint Functional Component Command for Global Strike (JFCC-GS) was a component of US Strategic Command (USSTRATCOM). It was established on 19 July 2006 when the Joint Functional Component for Space and Global Strike stood down. Its first commander was Lieutenant General Robert J. "Bob" Elder Jr., who simultaneously served as the commander of the 8th Air Force. JFCC-GS was inactivated on October 2, 2017 as part of USSTRATCOM's effort to reorganize its components into a more streamlined war fighting structure.

The commander of JFCC-GS served as Joint Force Air Component Commander (JFACC) for USSTRATCOM. When it stood down, the JFACC role was transferred to the commander of Air Force Global Strike Command.

== Mission ==
The official mission statement stated that "JFCC-GSI optimizes planning, integration, execution and force management of assigned missions of deterring attacks against the U.S., its territories, possessions and bases, and should deterrence fail, by employing appropriate forces."

== Operations ==
JFCC GSI integrates all elements of military power as it conducts, plans and presents global strike effects. Operations include:

- Leads integrated operational planning among all USSTRATCOM Components
- Provides integrated analysis of the command's global mission capabilities
- Develops and provides Global Strike and Integration execution recommendations
- Supports USSTRATCOM's Strategic Command and Control mission
- Operational and tactical control of global strike forces as directed
- Coordinates tasking to other joint components and service task forces for synchronizing USSTRATCOM operational and tactical mission planning and execution needs
- Supports USSTRATCOM nuclear command and control and force execution responsibilities
