= Joseph E. Tofalo =

American Naval Vice Admiral

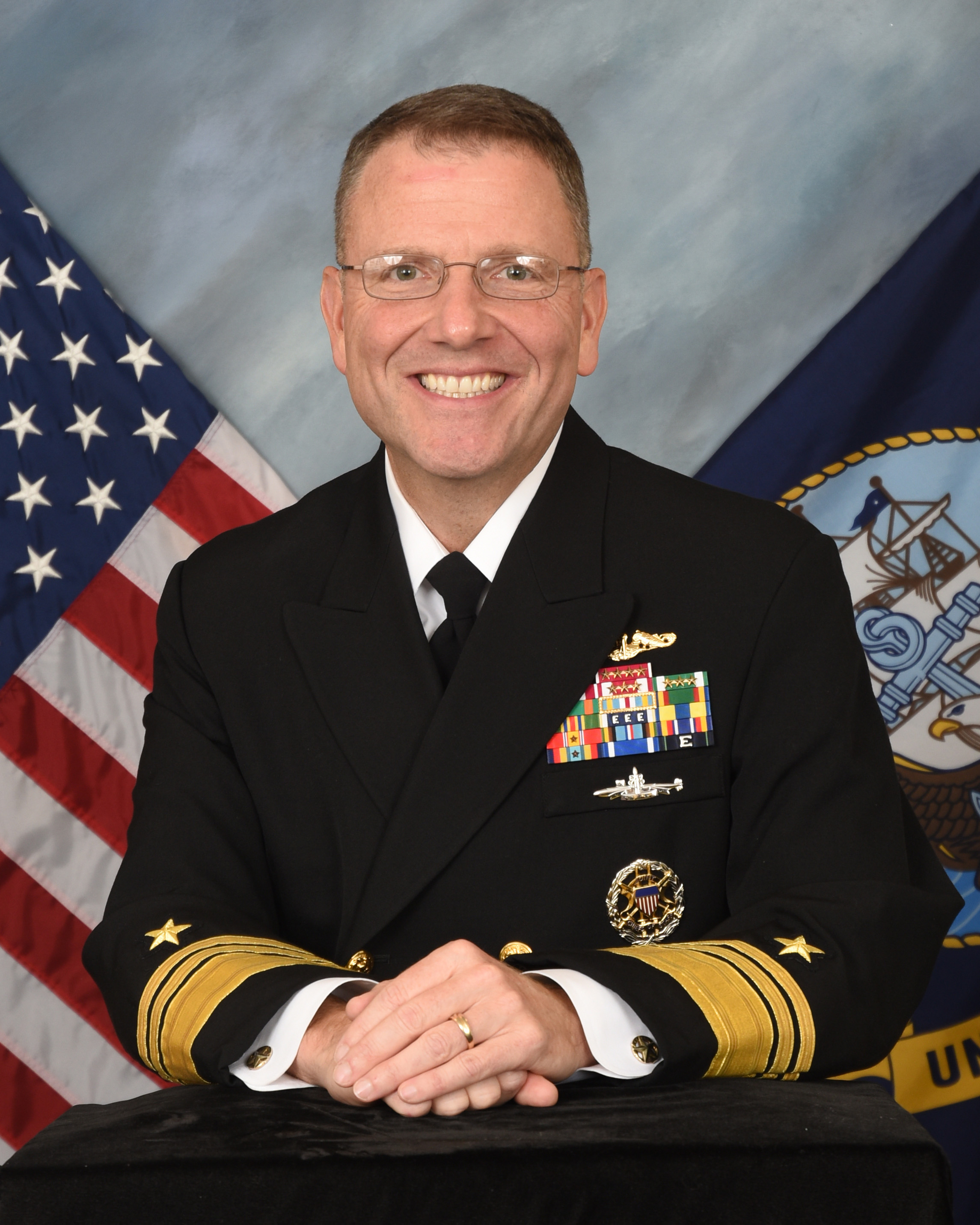
- VADM Joe Tofalo
- Born: January 18, 1962 (age 64); San Juan, Puerto Rico, United States
- Military career
- Allegiance: United States
- Branch: United States Navy
- Service years: 1983–2018
- Rank: Vice Admiral
- Nickname: Joe
- Commands: USS Maine (SSBN-741); Submarine Squadron 3 Submarine Group 10; U.S. Submarine Force
- Awards: Legion of Merit; Defense Meritorious Service Medal; Meritorious Service Medal

Vice Admiral Joseph Edward Tofalo is a United States Naval officer. Until 3 August 2018, he served as: Commander Submarine Forces; Commander Submarine Force Atlantic; Commander Task Force 144; Commander Task Force 84; Commander Allied Submarine Command.

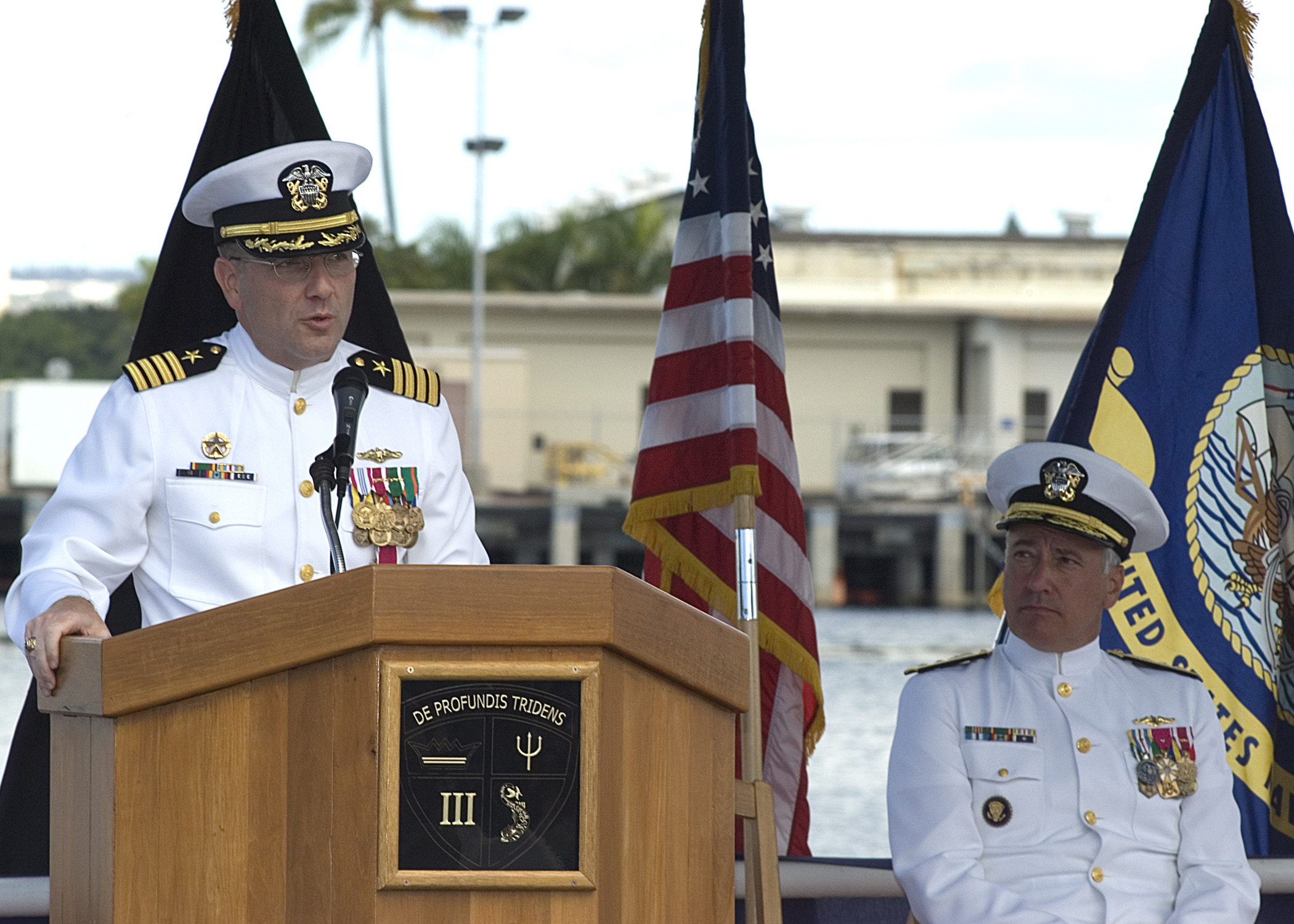
Capt. Joe E. Tofalo makes his final remarks as commanding officer of Submarine Squadron 3

== Early life and education ==
Joseph Tofalo was born to Margaret Tofalo, a member of the United States Navy WAVES, and United States Navy Captain Francis Tofalo. Tofalo grew up in Upstate New York. As a youth he became an Eagle Scout and was named the American Legion Eagle Scout of the Year in 1977.

Tofalo graduated from the United States Naval Academy with distinction in 1983 with a Bachelor of Science degree in computer science. He also has a Master of Science degree in Engineering Management from Catholic University of America.

== Naval career ==
Tofalo was a career submariner. He has served on USS Flasher (SSN-613), USS Michigan (SSBN-727), and USS Montpelier (SSN-765). He served as commanding officer of USS Maine (SSBN-741) and Commander, Submarine Squadron Three.

Tofalo's shore assignments include being an aide to the superintendent of the Naval Academy, serving on the chief of Naval Operations staff and Joint Staff, and being assigned to the United States Joint Forces Command Joint War Fighting Center. He served as senior member of the Tactical Readiness Evaluation team and prospective commanding officer instructor for the commander, Submarine Force Atlantic. After major command, Tofalo served as executive assistant to the commander, Fleet Forces Command, and as executive assistant to the Vice Chief of Naval Operations.

Tofalo was selected for rear admiral (lower half) in December 2009. His first flag assignment was as assistant deputy chief of staff for Global Force Management and Joint Operations (N3B), U.S. Fleet Forces Command.

Tofalo became the 14th commander, Submarine Group 10 on 5 August 2011. In December 2013 he relieved as director, undersea warfare division, N97, Office of the Chief of Naval Operations, Pentagon, Washington, District of Columbia.

On 11 September 2015 he relieved as commander, Submarine Forces; commander, Submarine Force Atlantic; commander, Task Force 144; commander, Task Force 84; and commander, Allied Submarine Command, Norfolk, Virginia. On 3 August 2018, he was relieved as commander, Submarine Forces &c. by Vice Adm. Charles A. Richard.
