= Submarine Squadron 6 =

Submarine Squadron Six
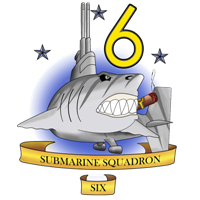
- Active: 1949–present
- Country: United States of America
- Branch: United States Navy
- Type: Submarine Squadron
- Part of: Submarine Force Atlantic(COMSUBLANT)
- Garrison/HQ: Naval Station Norfolk, Virginia
- Equipment: Nuclear Attack Submarines

Commanders
- Current Commodore: Capt. Sterling Jordan

Submarine Squadron 6 (also known as SUBRON 6) is a squadron of submarines in the United States Navy based at Norfolk, Virginia under the command of Capt. Sterling Jordan. The squadron uses Los Angeles-class and Virginia-class submarines.

== Submarines in Squadron ==
Ship	Hull number	Ship class
USS Helena	SSN-725	Los Angeles class
USS Montpelier	SSN-765	Los Angeles class
USS Pasadena	SSN-752	Los Angeles class
USS Albany	SSN-753	Los Angeles class
USS Boise	SSN-764	Los Angeles class
USS New Hampshire	SSN-778	Virginia class
USS New Mexico	SSN-779	Virginia class
USS John Warner	SSN-785	Virginia class
USS Washington	SSN-787	Virginia class
USS Montana	SSN-794	Virginia class
USS New Jersey	SSN-796	Virginia class
PCU Massachusetts	SSN-798	Virginia class
PCU Arkansas	SSN-800	Virginia class

== Mission ==
Submarine Squadron Six exercises operational control of Los Angeles-class attack submarines and Virginia-class submarines home ported in Norfolk, Virginia. The squadron is responsible for preparing submarine crews in all facets of operations, including tactical and operational readiness for war, inspection and monitoring duties, nuclear and radiological safety, and development and control of submarine operating schedules. SUBRON SIX also is responsible for matters pertaining to new submarine construction and for coordinating all submarine operations in the Virginia Capes Operating Areas, including logistical support and schedule deconfliction. In 2014, then-current commander, Paul Snodgrass stated, "The primary job at Squadron 6 is to train, mentor and certify crews for deployment. This broad range of responsibilities would be impossible without the dedication and hard work the squadron's staff of Sailors and civilians who eat, drink, and breathe submarining".

== Consolidation with Submarine Squadron 8 ==
On April 28, 2011, Submarine Squadrons 6 and 8 merged under the command of Submarine Squadron 6. Submarine Squadron 8 was reestablished on February 18, 2022. The squadron is responsible for the control of new submarine construction and ongoing submarine operating maintenance schedules of Los Angeles-class attack submarines and Virginia-class submarines homeported in Norfolk, Va.

== Resources ==
https://www.dvidshub.net/image/4608207/commander-submarine-squadron-6-change-command
