= Hyman G. Rickover (disambiguation) =

Hyman G. Rickover (1900–1986) was a U.S. naval admiral responsible for the development of naval nuclear propulsion, and also known as the "Father of the Nuclear Navy"

Hyman G. Rickover may also refer to:

- USS Hyman G. Rickover (SSN-709), a U.S. Navy Los Angeles-class nuclear submarine
- USS Hyman G. Rickover (SSN-795), a U.S. Navy Virginia-class nuclear-powered attack submarine
- Rickover Naval Academy, a school in Chicago, Illinois, U.S.
