= USS Oregon (SSN-793) =

US Navy Virginia-class submarine

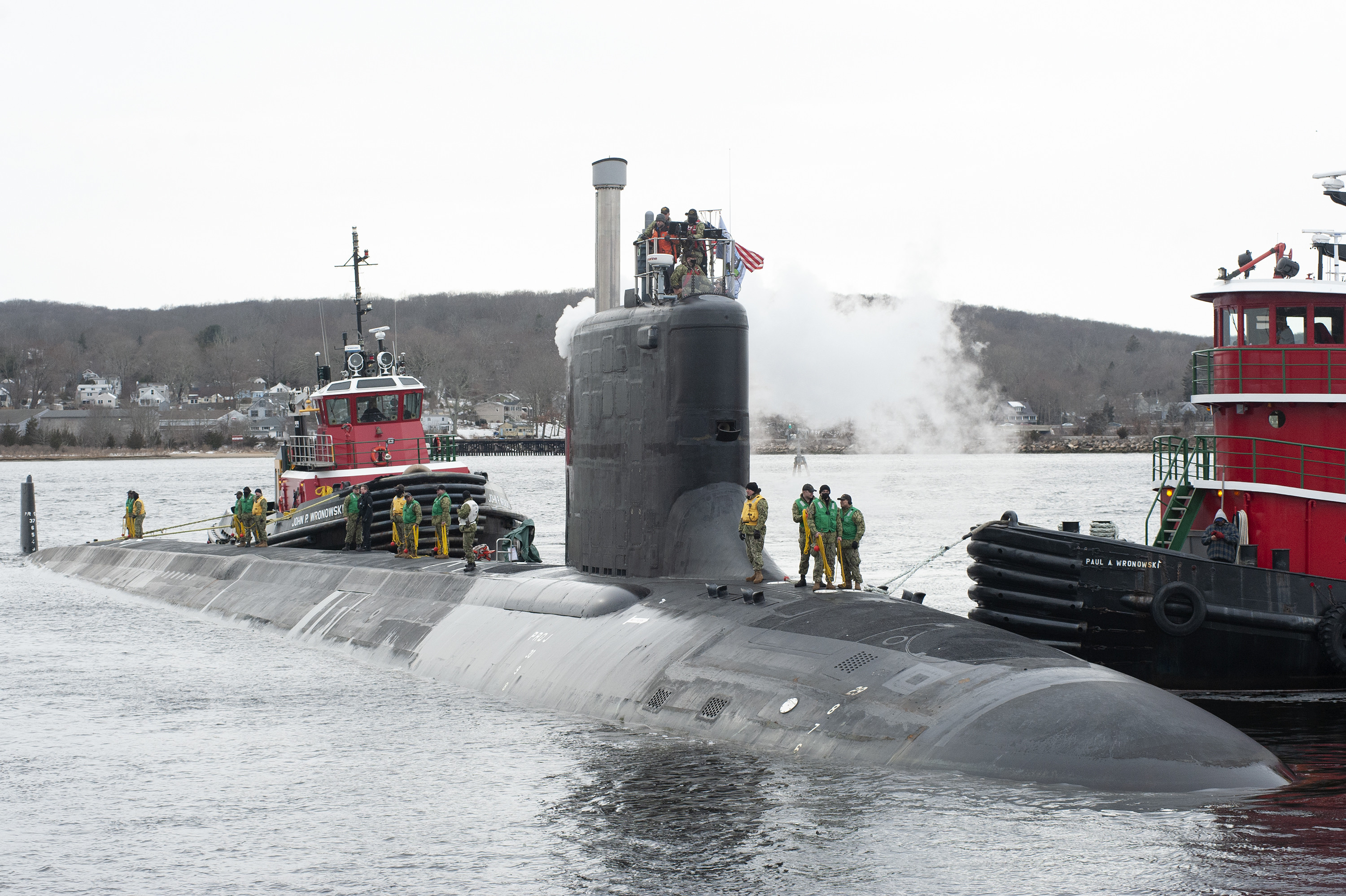
- Oregon on 1 March 2022

History

United States
- Name: USS Oregon
- Namesake: State of Oregon
- Ordered: 28 April 2014
- Builder: General Dynamics Electric Boat, Groton, Connecticut
- Laid down: 8 July 2017
- Launched: 25 June 2020
- Sponsored by: Dana L. Richardson
- Christened: 5 October 2019
- Acquired: 26 February 2022
- Commissioned: 28 May 2022
- Home port: Norfolk
- Identification: Hull symbol: SSN-793
- Motto: Alis Volat Propriis (She flies by her own wings)

General characteristics
- Class & type: Virginia-class submarine
- Displacement: 7,800 tons
- Length: 377 ft (115 m)
- Beam: 34 ft (10.4 m)
- Draft: 32 ft (9.8 m)
- Propulsion: 1 × S9G PWR nuclear reactor 280,000 shp (210 MW), HEU 93%; 2 × steam turbines 40,000 shp (30 MW); 1 × single shaft pump-jet propulsor; 1 × secondary propulsion motor
- Speed: 25 knots (46 km/h; 29 mph)
- Range: essentially unlimited; 33 years
- Endurance: can remain submerged for up to 3 months
- Test depth: greater than 800 ft (244 m)
- Complement: 15 officers; 120 enlisted men
- Armament: 12 x VLS tubes for BGM-109 Tomahawk; 4 x 21-inch (533 mm) torpedo tubes for Mk-48 torpedoes

USS Oregon (SSN-793) is a nuclear powered attack submarine in the United States Navy. She is the fourth vessel to carry the name Oregon, the 33rd state of US, and the 20th Virginia-class submarine. Secretary of the Navy Ray Mabus announced her name on 10 October 2014 at a ceremony hosted at the Battleship Oregon Memorial in Tom McCall Waterfront Park in Portland, Oregon.

== Construction and career ==
Oregon's keel was laid down on 8 July 2017, in a ceremony held at the Quonset Point Facility of General Dynamics Electric Boat in North Kingstown, Rhode Island, with sponsor Mrs. Dana L. Richardson, wife of Chief of Naval Operations, Admiral John Richardson, in attendance. On 5 October 2019, Mrs Richardson christened Oregon at Electric Boat in Groton, Connecticut. The ship was commissioned on 28 May 2022 at Naval Submarine Base New London.

A contract modification for Oregon SSN-793, Montana (SSN-794), and Hyman G. Rickover (SSN-795) was initially awarded to Electric Boat for US$594.7 million in April 2012. On 23 December 2014 they were awarded an additional $121.8 million contract modification to buy long lead-time material for the three Virginia-class submarines. The US Navy awarded Electric Boat the contract to construct 10 Block IV Virginia-class submarines for $17.6 billion on 28 April 2014. The first Block IV, Vermont (SSN-792), commenced in May 2014 with the tenth ship, Utah (SSN-801), scheduled for delivery in 2023.

On 28 May 2022, Oregon was commissioned in a ceremony at the Naval Submarine Base New London, Connecticut.
