= USS Montana (SSN-794) =

US Navy Virginia-class submarine

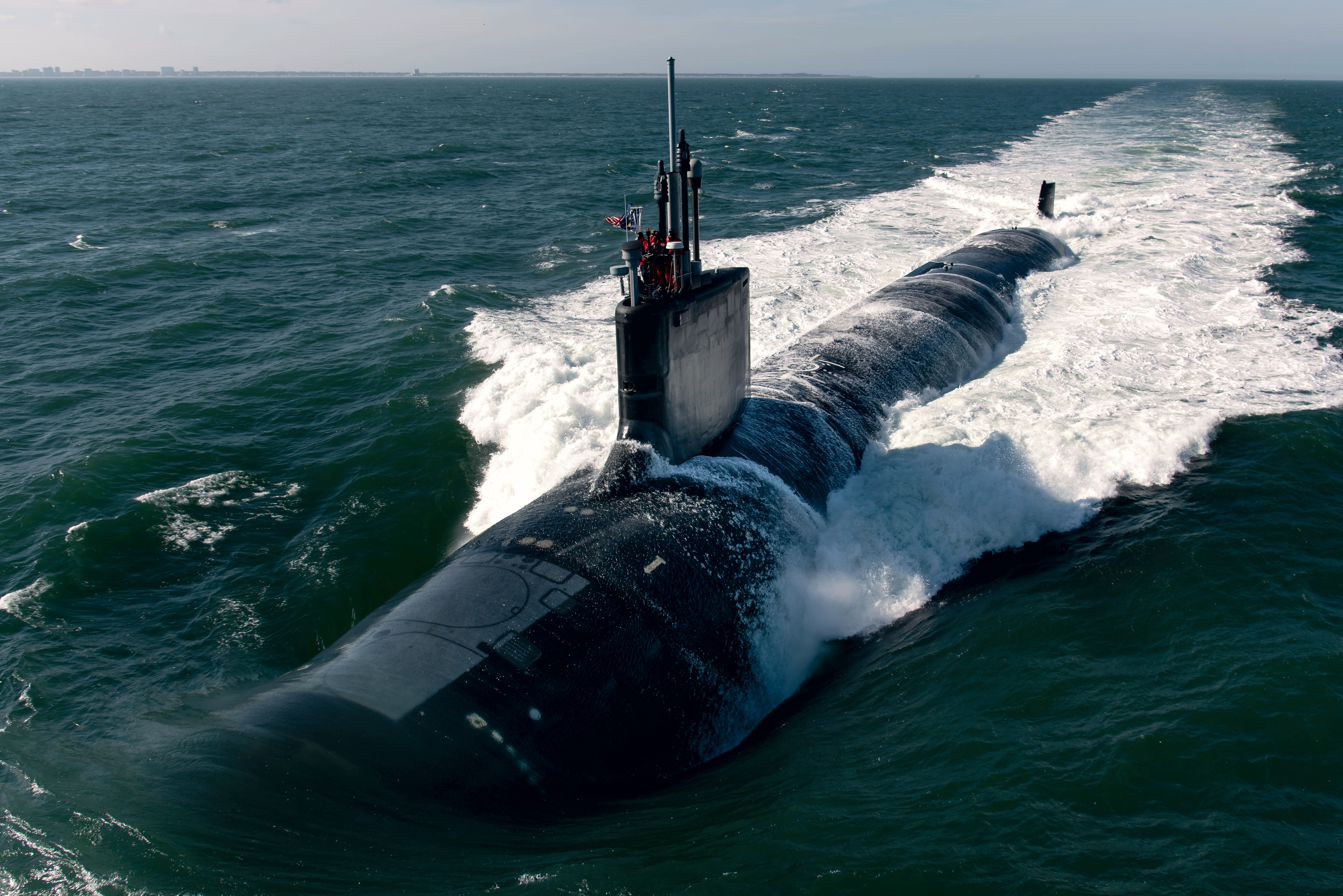
- Montana on 1 February 2022

History

United States
- Name: Montana
- Namesake: State of Montana
- Ordered: 28 April 2014
- Builder: Newport News Shipbuilding, Newport News, Virginia
- Laid down: 16 May 2018
- Launched: 8 February 2021
- Sponsored by: Sally Jewell
- Christened: 12 September 2020
- Acquired: 12 March 2022
- Commissioned: 25 June 2022
- Home port: Submarine Base Pearl Harbor
- Identification: Hull symbol: SSN-794
- Motto: “Vigilantes, Mount Up!” “Do or Die, Big Sky!”
- Status: In active service

General characteristics
- Class & type: Virginia-class submarine
- Displacement: 7,800 tons
- Length: 377 ft (115 m)
- Beam: 34 ft (10.4 m)
- Draft: 32 ft (9.8 m)
- Propulsion: S9G reactor
- Speed: ~25 knots (46 km/h)
- Endurance: 90+ days continuously submerged, limited by consumables
- Test depth: > 800 ft (244 m)
- Complement: 15 Officers; 120 Enlisted
- Armament: 2x Virginia Payload Modules (12 Vertical Launch Weapons), 4x 21 inch (530 mm) Torpedo Tubes for Mk-48 torpedoes

Montana (SSN-794) is a Virginia-class attack submarine of the United States Navy. She honors the U.S. State of Montana. Secretary of the Navy Ray Mabus announced the name on 3 September 2015 at a ceremony hosted in Billings, Montana with U.S. Senator Jon Tester.

A contract modification for USS Oregon (SSN-793), Montana (SSN-794), and USS Hyman G. Rickover (SSN-795) was initially awarded to General Dynamics Electric Boat for $594.7 million in April 2012. On 23 December 2014, they were awarded an additional $121.8 million contract modification to buy long lead-time material for the three Virginia-class submarines. The U.S. Navy awarded General Dynamics Electric Boat the contract to construct 10 Block IV Virginia-class submarines for $17.6 billion on 28 April 2014. The tenth boat is scheduled for delivery in 2023.

Construction of Montana began in May 2015 at Huntington Ingalls Newport News Shipbuilding in Virginia. Contract completion date was expected to be in May 2020, but this was delayed because of the COVID pandemic.

Sally Jewell, Montana's sponsor and former U.S. Interior Secretary, christened the vessel on 12 September 2020 at Newport News Shipbuilding, via a virtual ceremony due to the pandemic. Montana was rolled out on 15 October 2020 and will be delivered to the Navy by mid-2022. She was launched in February 2021, and was commissioned on 25 June 2022 at Naval Station Norfolk.
