= Naval Station Norfolk =

United States Navy base in Virginia

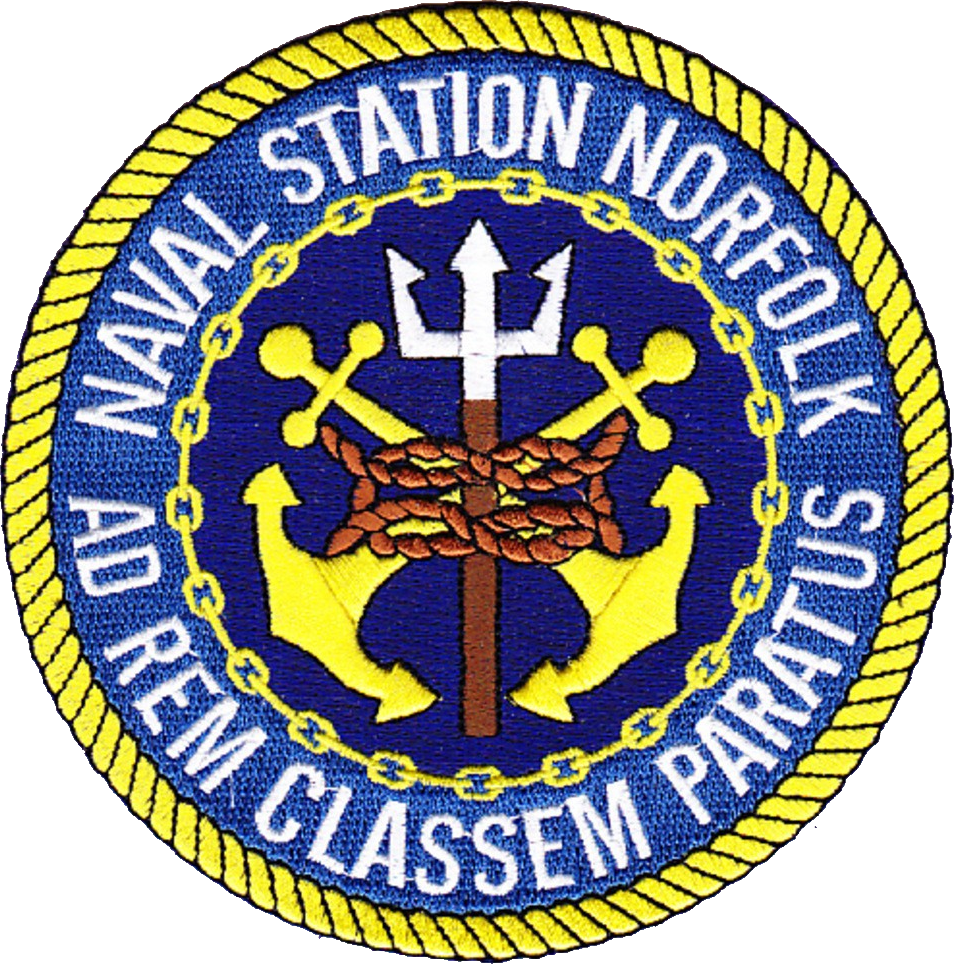
Naval Station Norfolk
- Part of Navy Region Mid-Atlantic
- Norfolk, Virginia, United States
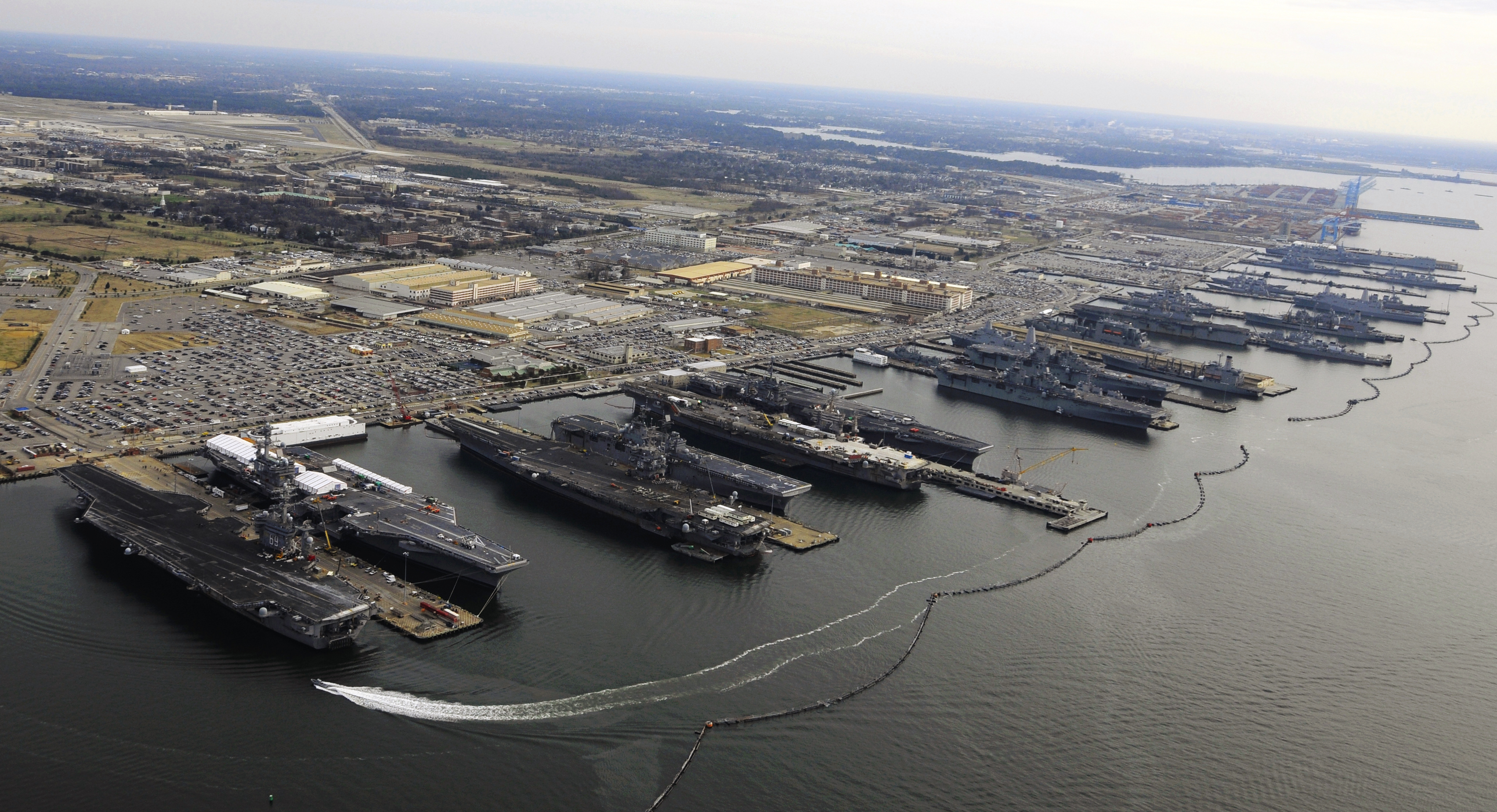
- Destroyers, replenishment oilers, cruisers, submarines, frigates, aircraft carriers and some other ships and an amphibious assault ship in Naval Station Norfolk. Pictured in December 2012.

Site information
- Type: Naval Base
- Owner: United States
- Operator: United States Navy
- Website: Official website

Location
- Coordinates: 36°56′42″N 76°18′47″W

Site history
- Built: July 4, 1917
- In use: 1917–present

Garrison information
- Current commander: CAPT Matt Schlarmann
- Occupants: Commander, Navy Region Mid-Atlantic; Commander, Navy Warfare Development Command

Naval Station Norfolk is a United States Navy base in Norfolk, Virginia, that is the headquarters and home port of the U.S. Navy's Fleet Forces Command. The installation occupies about 4 miles (6.4 km) of waterfront space and 11 miles (18 km) of pier and wharf space of the Hampton Roads peninsula known as Sewell's Point.

It is the world's largest naval station, with the largest concentration of U.S. Navy forces, with 75 ships alongside 14 piers, and 134 aircraft and 11 aircraft hangars at the adjacently operated Chambers Field. Port Services controls more than 3,100 ships' movements annually as they arrive and depart their berths.

Air Operations conducts over 100,000 flight operations each year, an average of 275 flights per day or one every six minutes. Over 150,000 passengers and 264,000 tons of mail and cargo depart annually on Air Mobility Command (AMC) aircraft and other AMC-chartered flights from the airfield's AMC Terminal.

== History ==
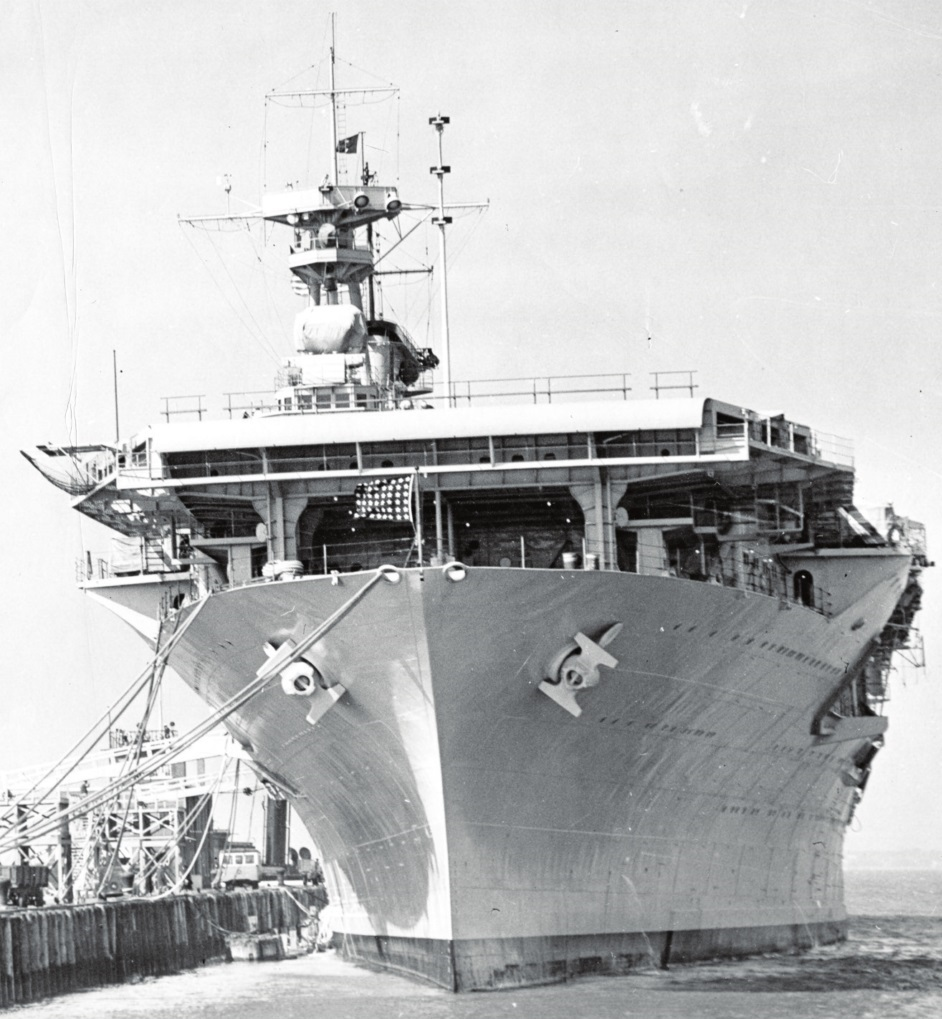
Aircraft carrier USS Yorktown docked at then–NOB Norfolk in October 1937.

The area where the base is located was the site of the original 1907 Jamestown Exposition.

In 1915, the Headquarters of the 5th Naval District was established. In April 1917, shortly after the United States entered World War I, a bill was passed for the purchase of the land, and money was set aside in the amount of $1.6 million for the development of the base. This bill was called the Military Deficiency Appropriation Bill. When the United States entered World War I, the Navy needed a large operations center on the East Coast, which caused the base to expand very quickly.

In October 1917, the base established a seaplane airfield. In 1918, it was separated and became Naval Air Station Hampton Roads. The Naval Operating Base (NOB) and other facilities were established. By 1918, there were 34,000 enlisted men at the base. At the war's end, the base was reduced in personnel and put into a "standby mode."

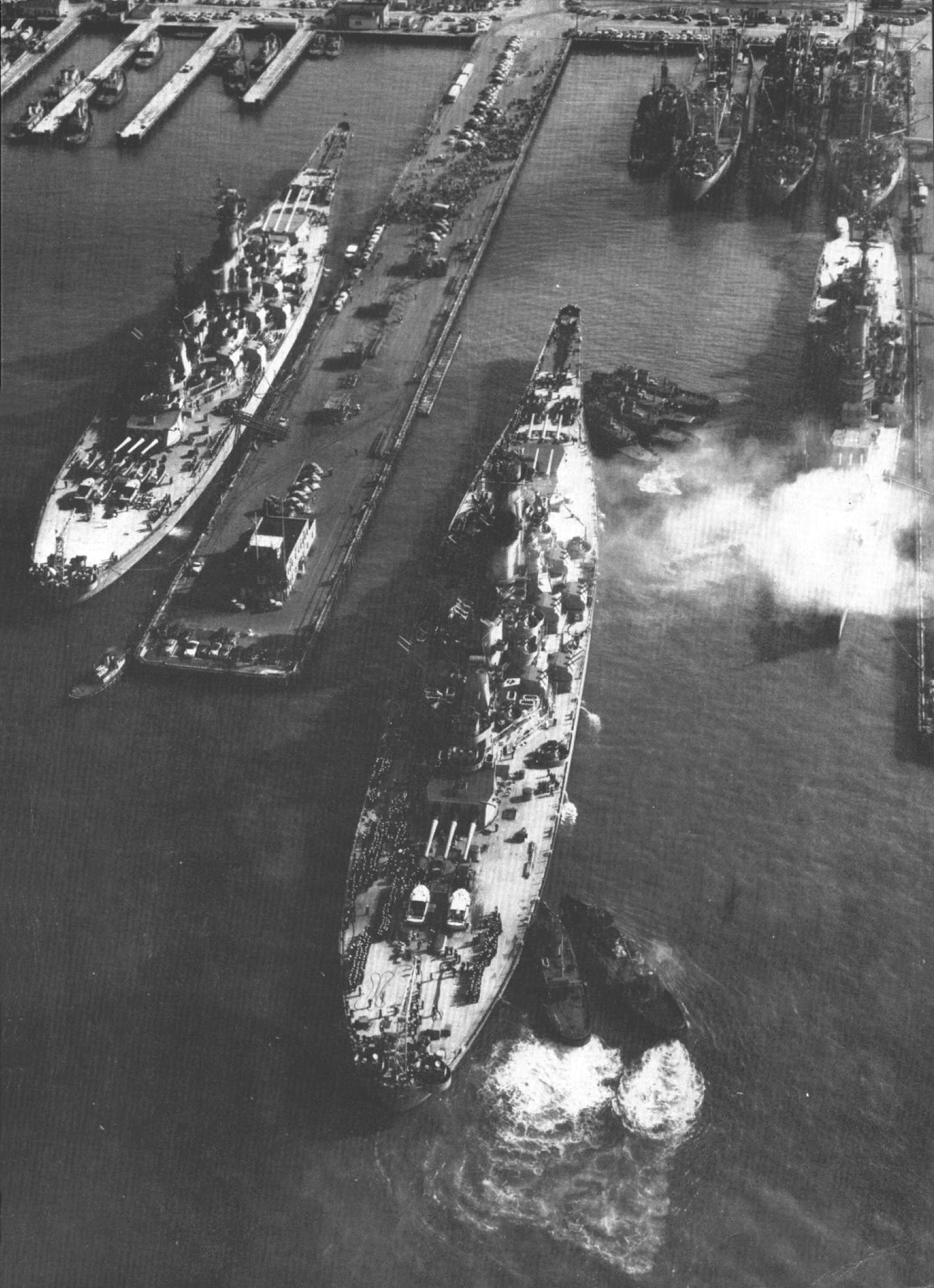
Iowa-class battleships USS New Jersey and USS Missouri at NS Norfolk in 1954.

When World War II began in Europe in 1939, the base became more active again. New facilities were built, including new runways for aircraft, part of Naval Air Station Norfolk. Ramps were built to operate seaplanes. About 400 acres was acquired and, by 1943, the air station had become a central airfield for operations. It trained naval air units for the rest of the war.

In March 1946, the Chief of Naval Operations ordered the Commandant of the 5th Naval District to place NOB Norfolk and NAS Norfolk as separate installations under the command of Commandant Naval Base, whose title was soon changed to Commander, Navy Region, Mid-Atlantic.

Following World War II, NOB Norfolk became the primary base of the Atlantic Fleet. It was one of the largest naval bases in the world.

On 1 January 1953, the name of the naval base was officially changed to Naval Station Norfolk (NS Norfolk), after being known as the NOB.

In 1968, the Naval Air Station was given a major role in John F. Kennedy's vision of putting a man on the moon. The air station became Recovery Control Center Atlantic, which provided command, control, and communications for the ships and aircraft that participated in the recovery operations of Apollo 7.

Due to the end of the Cold War, a drawdown began in the 1990s, and the Navy began closing shore installations to help reduce operating costs. Due to this, the Navy merged the separate Naval Station Norfolk and Naval Air Station Norfolk into a single installation to be called Naval Station Norfolk, which became official on 5 February 1999.

Following the attack on USS Cole in October 2000 and the 11 September 2001 terrorist attacks, the base had some major upgrades to its security gates, costing more than $12.5 million.

On 26 January 2017, Naval Station Norfolk celebrated its centennial at the Pennsylvania House, a historical building built for the Jamestown Exposition, located on the base.

== Incidents ==
On Easter (3 April) in 1988, members of the anti-nuclear group Plowshares boarded the battleship USS Iowa during a public tour and used hammers and symbolic blood to deface the ship's empty Tomahawk missile launchers.

On March 24, 2014, a shooting at NS Norfolk resulted in the death of a sailor and a civilian. The shooting occurred around 11:20 p.m. EDT aboard USS Mahan. Security forces shot and killed the civilian who had allegedly shot the sailor aboard the vessel. The base was closed for a short time after the shooting on USS Mahan.

On 26 July 2022, a severe thunderstorm with winds of 60 miles per hour (97 km/h) and over caused nine helicopters assigned to Naval Station Norfolk to be damaged. Damaged aircraft include the MH-60 Seahawk and MH-53E Sea Dragon, according to the Navy.

== Operational units ==
Naval Station Norfolk is home port of four carrier strike groups and their assigned ships. Norfolk is the home of several Military Sealift Command ships, and the submarines of the Atlantic Fleet.

As of October 2025, the following operational units are headquartered or homeported at Naval Station Norfolk:

=== Carrier Strike Groups (CARSTRKGRU) ===
- Carrier Strike Group Two
- Carrier Strike Group Eight
- Carrier Strike Group Ten
- Carrier Strike Group Twelve

=== Destroyer Squadrons (DESRONS) ===
- Destroyer Squadron 2
- Destroyer Squadron 22
- Destroyer Squadron 26
- Destroyer Squadron 28

=== Aircraft carriers ===
- USS Dwight D. Eisenhower (CVN-69)
- USS Harry S. Truman (CVN-75)
- USS George H.W. Bush (CVN-77)
- USS Gerald R. Ford (CVN-78)

=== Cruiser ===
- USS Gettysburg (CG-64)

=== Amphibious assault ===
- USS Wasp (LHD-1)
- USS Kearsarge (LHD-3)
- USS Bataan (LHD-5)
- USS Iwo Jima (LHD-7)
- USS San Antonio (LPD-17)
- USS Mesa Verde (LPD-19)
- USS New York (LPD-21)
- USS Arlington (LPD-24)
- USS Fort Lauderdale (LPD-28)

=== Guided missile destroyers ===
- USS Stout (DDG-55)
- USS Mitscher (DDG-57)
- USS Laboon (DDG-58)
- USS Gonzalez (DDG-66)
- USS Cole (DDG-67)
- USS Ross (DDG-71)
- USS Mahan (DDG-72)
- USS McFaul (DDG-74)
- USS Porter (DDG-78)
- USS Nitze (DDG-94)
- USS James E. Williams (DDG-95)
- USS Bainbridge (DDG-96)
- USS Forrest Sherman (DDG-98)
- USS Truxtun (DDG-103)
- USS Gravely (DDG-107)

=== Military Sealift Command ===
- USNS Comfort (T-AH-20)
- USNS Lewis and Clark (T-AKE-1)
- USNS Leroy Grumman (T-AO-195)
- USNS Kanawha (T-AO-196)
- USNS Patuxent (T-AO-201)
- USNS Laramie (T-AO-203)
- USNS Supply (T-AOE-6)
- USNS Arctic (T-AOE-8)
- USNS Zeus (T-ARC-7)
- USNS Robert F Kennedy (T-AO 208)
- USS Robert E Simanek (ESB-7)

=== Submarines ===
As of September 2025 the following operational submarine units and submarines are headquartered respectively homeported at Naval Station Norfolk:

- Commander, Submarine Squadron 6 (CSS 6):
  - Los Angeles-class submarines:
    - USS Pasadena (SSN-752)
  - Virginia-class submarines:
    - USS New Hampshire (SSN-778)
    - USS New Mexico (SSN-779)
    - USS Oregon (SSN-793)
    - Pre-Commissioning Unit (PCU) USS Barb (SSN-804)
- Commander, Submarine Squadron 8 (CSS 8):
  - Los Angeles-class submarines:
    - USS Columbus (SSN-762)
    - USS Boise (SSN-764)
    - USS Montpelier (SSN-765)
  - Virginia-class submarines:
    - USS John Warner (SSN-785)
    - USS Washington (SSN-787)
    - USS New Jersey (SSN-796)
    - USS Massachusetts (SSN-798)
    - Pre-Commissioning Unit (PCU) USS Arkansas (SSN-800)
    - Pre-Commissioning Unit (PCU) USS Oklahoma (SSN-802)

== Tenant/Shore Commands ==
Naval Station Norfolk is headquarters to a number of shore activities that provide administrative and specialty support to regional operational assets, and in some cases, the entire Navy.

As of June 2021, these included:

- Navy Warfare Development Command
- Navy Region Mid-Atlantic
- United States Second Fleet
- Carrier Strike Group Four
- Navy Expeditionary Combat Command
- Naval Reserve Force
- Navy Fleet Readiness Centers
- Naval Surface Force Atlantic
- Naval Computer and Telecommunications Area Master Station Atlantic (NCTAMS LANT)
- Navy Exchange Command
- Naval Safety Center
- Naval Criminal Investigative Service, Norfolk Field Office headquarters and NCIS Resident Agency (NCISRA) Norfolk, a subordinate component of the Norfolk Field Office.
- Commander Navy Installations Command, N6 and N8

== Base housing ==
There is a public-private venture (PPV) housing by Liberty Military Housing for accompanied service members. Some properties are on the property of the base.

== See also ==
- Commodore Levy Chapel
- United States Navy submarine bases
