= USS Pasadena (SSN-752) =

Los Angeles-class nuclear-powered attack submarine of the US Navy

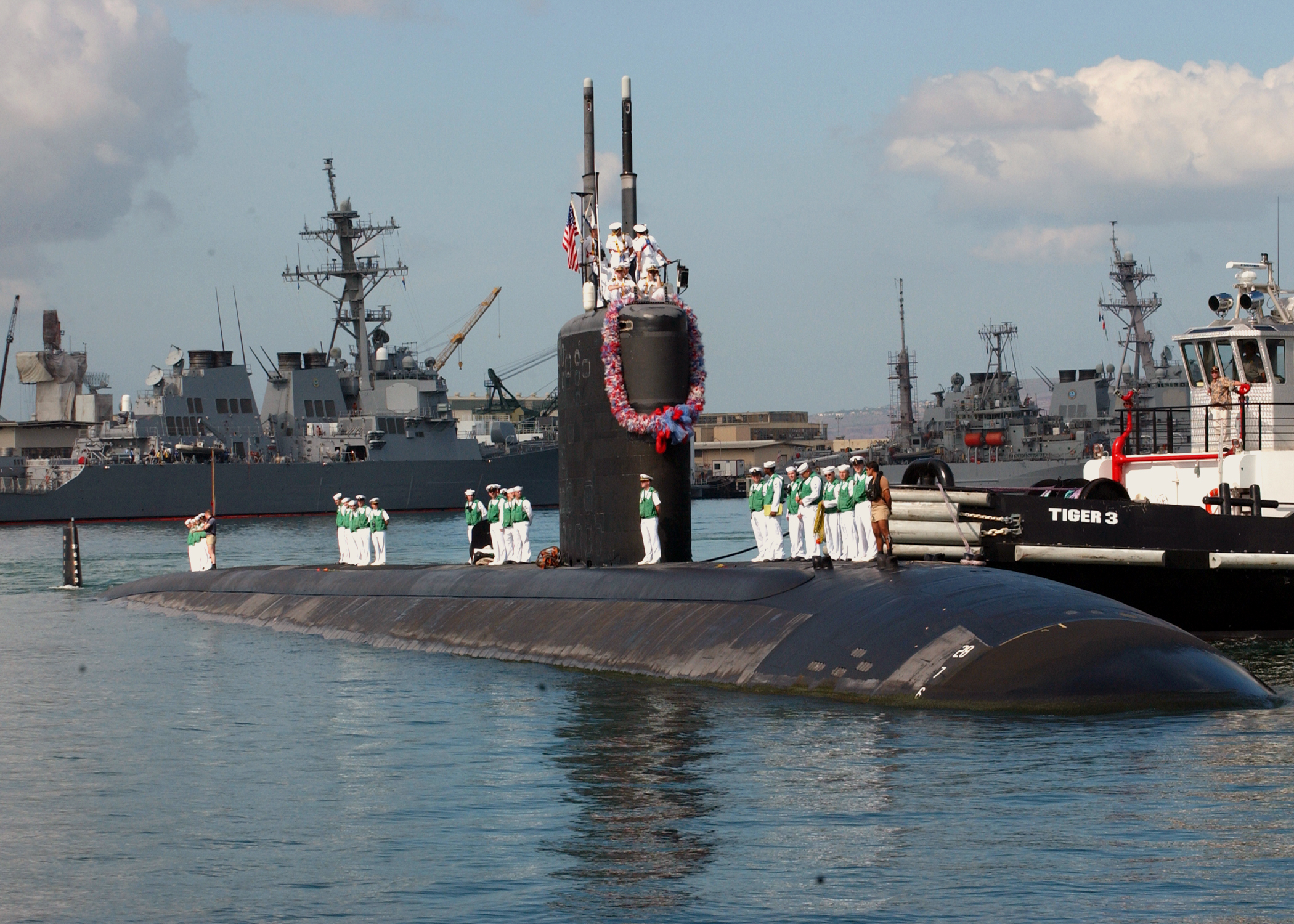
- USS Pasadena (SSN-752)

History

United States
- Name: USS Pasadena
- Namesake: City of Pasadena, California
- Awarded: 30 November 1982
- Builder: General Dynamics Electric Boat
- Laid down: 20 December 1985
- Launched: 12 September 1987
- Commissioned: 11 February 1989
- Home port: Naval Station Norfolk, U.S.
- Motto: "Anytime Anywhere"
- Honors and awards: Navy Unit Commendation Meritorious Unit Commendation Battle Effectiveness "E" Award
- Status: in active service
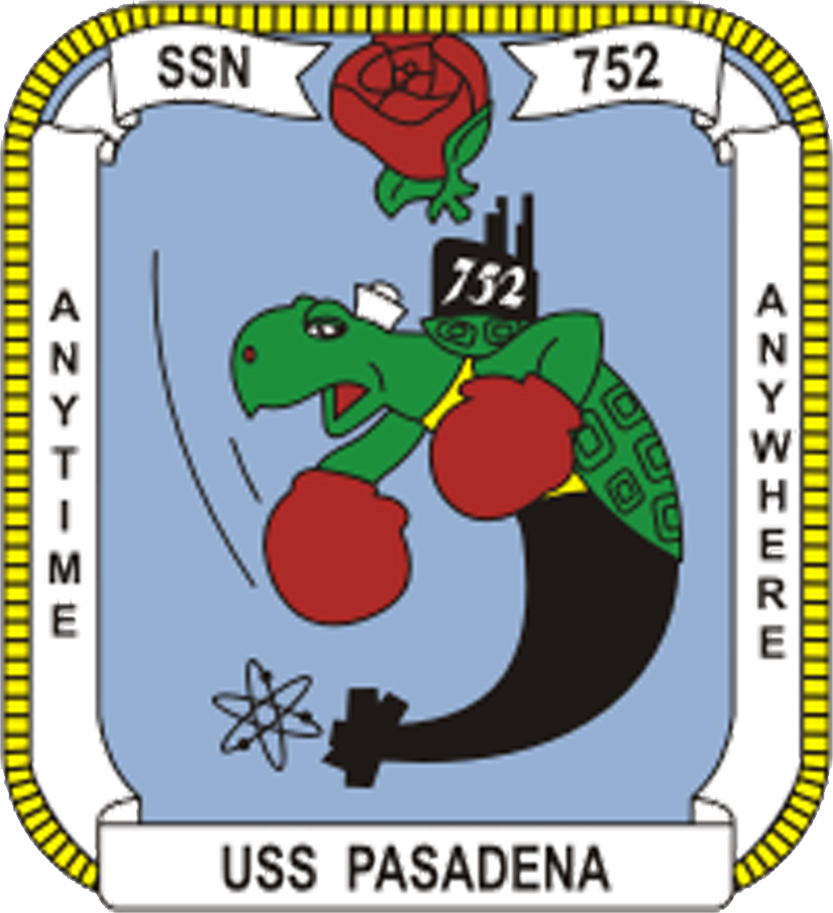
- Badge

General characteristics
- Class & type: Los Angeles-class submarine
- Displacement: 5,802 tons light, 6,204 tons full, 402 tons dead
- Length: 110.3 m (362 ft)
- Beam: 10 m (33 ft)
- Draft: 9.4 m (31 ft)
- Propulsion: 1 × S6G PWR nuclear reactor with D2W core (165 MW), HEU 93.5%; 2 × steam turbines (33,500) shp; 1 × shaft; 1 × secondary propulsion motor 325 hp (242 kW)
- Speed: Surfaced: 20 knots (23 mph; 37 km/h); Submerged: +25 knots (29 mph; 46 km/h) (official)
- Complement: 12 officers, 98 men
- Sensors & processing systems: AN/BQQ-10 passive sonar, BQS-15 detecting and ranging sonar, WLR-8 fire control radar receiver, WLR-9 acoustic receiver for detection of active search sonar and acoustic homing torpedoes, BRD-7 radio direction finder
- Armament: 4 × 21 in (533 mm) bow tubes, 10 Mk48 ADCAP torpedo reloads, Tomahawk land attack missile block 3 SLCM range 1,700 nautical miles (3,100 km), Harpoon anti–surface ship missile range 70 nautical miles (130 km), mine laying Mk67 mobile Mk60 captor mines

USS Pasadena (SSN-752) is a Los Angeles-class submarine and the third ship of the United States Navy to be named for Pasadena, California.

Pasadena provides the Fleet Commander or Task Force Commander a multi-mission platform. This vessel has unlimited endurance due to the nuclear propulsion plant, advanced sonar, torpedo, cruise missile, and mine delivery systems, a combination of speed and stealth due to quieting and the capacity to fulfill numerous missions.

== History ==
The contract to build her was awarded to the Electric Boat Division of General Dynamics Corporation in Groton, Connecticut, on 30 November 1982 and her keel was laid down on 20 December 1985. She was launched on 12 September 1987 sponsored by Mrs. Pauline Trost, and commissioned on 11 February 1989 with Commander W. Fritchman in command.

Originally assigned to Submarine Force, U.S. Atlantic Fleet, Pasadena conducted an inter-fleet transfer in October 1990 to the Submarine Force, U.S. Pacific Fleet, and was homeported in San Diego, California.

In July 1991, Pasadena became the first Improved 688 Class submarine to deploy, commencing a six-month Western Pacific deployment. In June 1993, she commenced a six-month Western Pacific deployment to the Persian Gulf. While deployed, Pasadena participated in several exercises with the Royal Saudi, Royal Omani and Royal Australian Navies, and was the first United States nuclear-powered attack submarine (SSN) to conduct exercises with the Indian Navy in the MALABAR Naval Exercise. She also became the first nuclear-powered submarine to visit the port of Jeddah, Saudi Arabia on the Red Sea.

In March 1995, Pasadena again deployed on a six-month Western Pacific Deployment. While deployed to the Persian Gulf she became the first nuclear-powered submarine to visit the port of Muscat, Oman; the first to operate continuously inside the Persian Gulf; and the first SSN to be assigned to Commander, U.S. Fifth Fleet.

In April 1996, Pasadena changed homeports to Pearl Harbor, Hawaii, where she was assigned to Commander, Submarine Squadron Seven. From June 1996 to September 1996, Pasadena underwent a Selected Restricted Availability (SRA) where she was outfitted with improved offensive and defensive weapon systems. In April 1997, Pasadena deployed to the Eastern Pacific for a four-month deployment in support of UNITAS.

From September 2011 until late 2013, Pasadena was refitted at the Portsmouth Naval Shipyard. Her sonar, fire-control system, and navigation equipment were upgraded. Following the update, Pasadena joined her new posting, Submarine Squadron 11 in San Diego, in November 2013.

Following an intense workup from November 2013 until December 2014, Pasadena deployed to the Western Pacific for six months in January 2015. The deployment saw Pasadena conduct port visits in Yokosuka, Japan, Sasebo, Japan, Busan, South Korea, Singapore and Guam.

Following successful completion of her Drydocking Selected Restricted Availability (DSRA) at Norfolk Naval Shipyard, Pasadena returned to the fleet on 31 October 2021.

In March 2022, she participated in ICEX 2022, which involved surfacing through the arctic ice along with the Virginia-class submarine, USS Illinois. According to the US Navy, "ICEX 2022 was a three-week exercise that allows the Navy to assess its operational readiness in the Arctic"

In July 2023, she participated in UNITAS LXIV, a multinational maritime exercise conducted annually in waters around Central and South America to enhance security cooperation and improve coalition operations. UNITAS LXIV saw Pasadena conduct port visits in Guantánamo Bay, Cuba (U.S. Naval Station), Cartagena, Colombia, and Ocho Rios, Jamaica

== Awards ==
- Morale and Welfare Recreation (MWR) Fleet Recreation award (for the entire Navy), 2001
- Submarine Squadron Seven

 Battle "E" Effectiveness award, 1998 

- Submarine Squadron Eleven

 Battle "E" Effectiveness award, 2015 
 Battle "E" Effectiveness award, 2017 

- Submarine Squadron 6

 Battle "E" Effectiveness award, 2023

== Insignia ==
Pasadena's insignia is surrounded by a mooring line border with blue background, emphasizing the nautical character of the seal. The surrounding banner carries the ship's hull number and name and bracketed by the motto. The motto, in addition to enhancing the central combative caricature, states in clear terms the readiness of today's force to fight anywhere in the world on short notice in the national interest. The red rose ties the ship to the City of Pasadena, home of the New Year's Day Tournament of Roses Parade, which dates back more than 100 years. The turtle pugilist ties SSN-752 to Pasadena (CL-65), a World War II light cruiser that earned six battle stars. The emblem for CL-65 was created for the cruiser by Walt Disney. Coincidentally, during the sub's construction at the Electric Boat Division of General Dynamics in Groton, CT, the crew adopted a North American Snapping Turtle as a mascot. The creature actually rode the boat into the Thames river during its launching. By the time construction was over, the turtle, named Frumpy, which originally fit into the palm of a hand, was over 18 inches long, forcing the crew to find a new home. Cal Poly in Pomona proved a willing host. To get Frumpy to the new abode, two crew members: ET1(SS) Del Laughery, and ET1(SS) Don Hilliker, both pilots, flew the turtle in a private aircraft from Groton to Pomona.

== Popular culture ==
- Pasadena is featured in the anime, Full Metal Panic!.
- Pasadena is the center of the 1990 novel Boomer, by Charles Taylor
- Pasadena is featured in the Tom Clancy novel Executive Orders as one of several fast-attack submarines tasked to monitor the hostilities growing between The People's Republic of China and The Republic of China (Taiwan).
- Pasadena is also featured in Tom Clancy's novel Debt of Honor.
