= USS Boise (SSN-764) =

Los Angeles-class nuclear-powered attack submarine of the US Navy

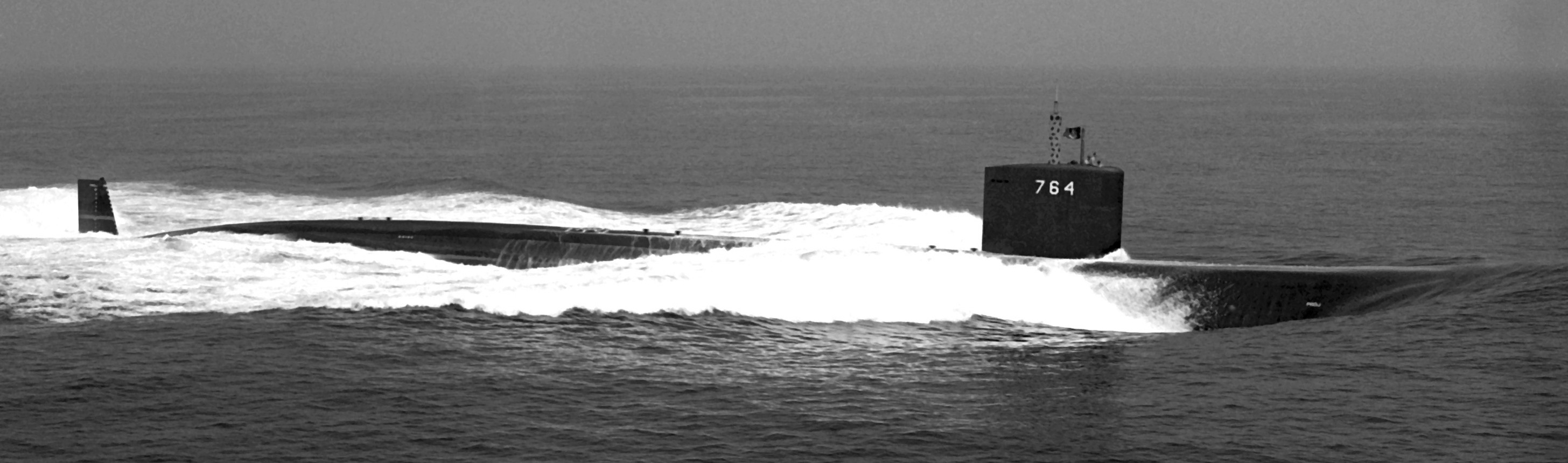
- USS Boise underway

History

United States
- Name: USS Boise
- Namesake: The City of Boise, Idaho
- Awarded: 6 February 1987
- Builder: Newport News Shipbuilding and Drydock Company
- Laid down: 25 August 1988
- Launched: 23 March 1991
- Commissioned: 7 November 1992
- Home port: Norfolk, Virginia
- Motto: A One Ship Fleet
- Status: Retired
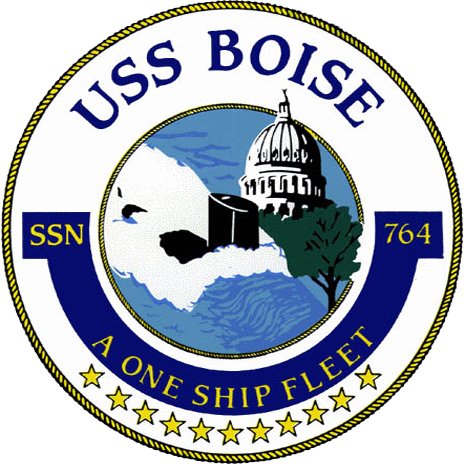
- Badge

General characteristics
- Class & type: Los Angeles-class submarine
- Displacement: 6,000 long tons (6,096 t) light; 6,927 long tons (7,038 t) full; 927 long tons (942 t) dead
- Length: 110.3 m (361 ft 11 in)
- Beam: 10 m (32 ft 10 in)
- Draft: 9.4 m (30 ft 10 in)
- Propulsion: 1 × S6G PWR nuclear reactor with D2W core (165 MW), HEU 93.5%; 2 × steam turbines (33,500) shp; 1 × shaft; 1 × secondary propulsion motor 325 hp (242 kW)
- Speed: Surfaced:20 knots (23 mph; 37 km/h); Submerged: +20 knots (23 mph; 37 km/h) (official)
- Complement: 13 officers, 121 Enlisted
- Sensors & processing systems: BQQ-5 passive sonar, BQS-15 detecting and ranging sonar, WLR-8 fire control radar receiver, WLR-9 acoustic receiver for detection of active search sonar and acoustic homing torpedoes, BRD-7 radio direction finder
- Armament: 4 × 21-inch (533 mm) bow tubes, 10 Mk48 ADCAP torpedo reloads, Tomahawk land attack missile block 3 SLCM range 1,700 nautical miles (3,100 km), Harpoon anti–surface ship missile range 70 nautical miles (130 km), mine laying Mk67 mobile Mk60 captor mines

USS Boise (SSN-764), a Los Angeles-class submarine, is the second ship of the United States Navy to be named for Boise, Idaho. The contract to build her was awarded to Newport News Shipbuilding and Dry Dock Company in Newport News, Virginia on 6 February 1987 and her keel was laid down on 25 August 1988. She was launched on 23 March 1991, and commissioned on 7 November 1992.

== Service history ==
During a Joint Task Force Exercise (JTFEX) carried out in 1999, Boise was reported "sunk" by Dutch diesel-electric powered submarine HNLMS Walrus. In the same exercise Walrus reportedly also took down eight other allied vessels, including the aircraft carrier USS Theodore Roosevelt and USS Mount Whitney, flagship of the United States Sixth Fleet.

In 2002 Boise was assigned to the John F. Kennedy carrier strike group when the group took part in Operation Enduring Freedom.

In March 2003, Boise delivered some of the opening shots of Operation Iraqi Freedom when she launched a full load of Tomahawk missiles in support of the initial invasion. The ship and crew were later awarded the Navy Unit Commendation for their distinguished service in action.

In February 2017, Boise was no longer dive-certified as she was awaiting scheduled maintenance at Norfolk. Due to congestion and delays in Navy shipyards, it was planned that Boise would receive maintenance at a private shipyard during fiscal year 2019. However, due to unforeseen delays, she only entered drydock in early 2021 with plans to return to service in 2023. As of 2025, she is still in drydock, and maintenance was expected to be completed in 2029, but was canceled in 2026.

The long wait has been attributed to a ten year lapse in capabilities and logistic setbacks discovered during the retrofit and restoration work done on submarines Helena and Columbus.

== Inactivation ==
On 10 April 2026, the Navy announced that Boise would be inactivated to reallocate funding and personnel to higher priority programs.
