= 2014 Norfolk Navy Station shooting =

Shooting attack in Virginia, U.S.

Coordinates: 36.9339°N 76.3298°W

Norfolk Naval Station shooting
- Location: USS Mahan, Naval Station Norfolk, Virginia, U.S.
- Date: March 24, 2014; 11:20 p.m
- Deaths: 2 (including the perpetrator)
- Injuries: 1
- Perpetrator: Jeffrey Tyrone Savage

The Norfolk Navy Station shooting took place at Navy Pier 1, located within the larger Naval Station Norfolk in Virginia, United States, at approximately 11:20 at night on March 24, 2014. Jeffrey Tyrone Savage, a 35-year-old civilian truck driver, drove his 2002 Freightliner near the pier and boarded the USS Mahan, a guided-missile destroyer. Savage was unarmed, but disarmed the sailor guarding the ship and used her weapon to shoot Petty Officer Mark Mayo, who intervened, fatally injuring him. Savage was later killed in a shootout with Navy security forces. Mayo was chief of the guard of the ship.

The incident was the subject of two investigations, one conducted by the Naval Criminal Investigative Service and the other by a one-star admiral to find out whether security procedures were followed at the base.

The investigation conducted by the admiral Jeffrey Harley found that the Gate 5 personnel were "clearly negligent". It also said that the civilian police that responded to the incident had a "gross lack of procedural compliance, accountability and oversight". Savage was not asked for identification or authorization to enter the base, since the civilian police officer at the gate assumed that Savage was going to make a U-turn. Even after Savage did not turn around, the civilian police officer did not follow protocol and pursue Savage or deploy the base's anti-access control system; he instead returned to check the identification of the next few cars at the gate before telling another civilian police officer about the breach.

None of the gate guards notified anyone of the unauthorized access to the base. The police officer-in-charge found Savage's idling truck but did not inform Naval Station Norfolk's security, instead going back to Gate 5. The sole Pier 1 Entry Control Point sentry was moving traffic cones to allow the Chief of the Guard duty vehicle to pass, leaving the control point unmanned. The sentry radioed the USS Mahan's quarterdeck to inform them that Savage entered Pier 1 without authorization after he did not comply with her demands to stop and show identification. The Petty Officer of the Watch from whom Savage stole the gun from failed to aim the gun at Savage.

An autopsy found that Savage was under the influence of synthetic marijuana at the time of the shooting. A packet of a "green, leafy substance 'presumed to be marijuana'" was found in one of his pockets. Savage was also suspected to have an undiagnosed mental illness. A person that knew Savage described him as "a loner without any friends who suffered from financial stress, was delusional and could not face reality" in an interview with the Federal Bureau of Investigation.

Mayo was later awarded the Navy and Marine Corps Medal, the Navy and Marines' highest non-combat decoration.
