= USS Washington (SSN-787) =

US Navy Virginia-class submarine

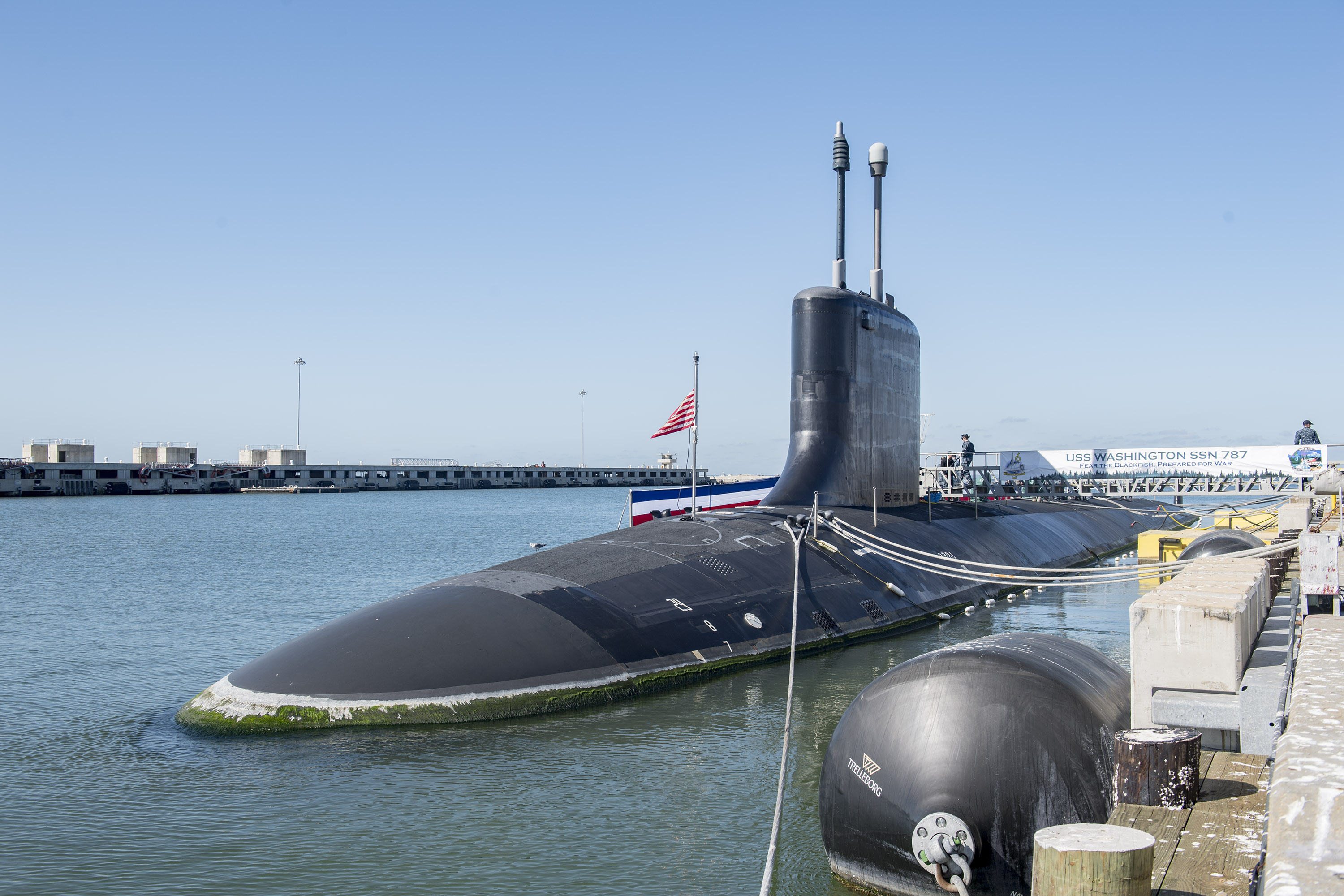
- Washington in October 2017

History

United States
- Name: USS Washington
- Namesake: State of Washington
- Awarded: 22 December 2008
- Builder: Newport News Shipbuilding
- Laid down: 22 November 2014
- Launched: 13 April 2016
- Sponsored by: Elisabeth Mabus
- Christened: 5 March 2016
- Acquired: 26 May 2017
- Commissioned: 7 October 2017
- Home port: Naval Station Norfolk
- Motto: "Preserving Peace, Prepared for War"
- Status: Active, In Commission
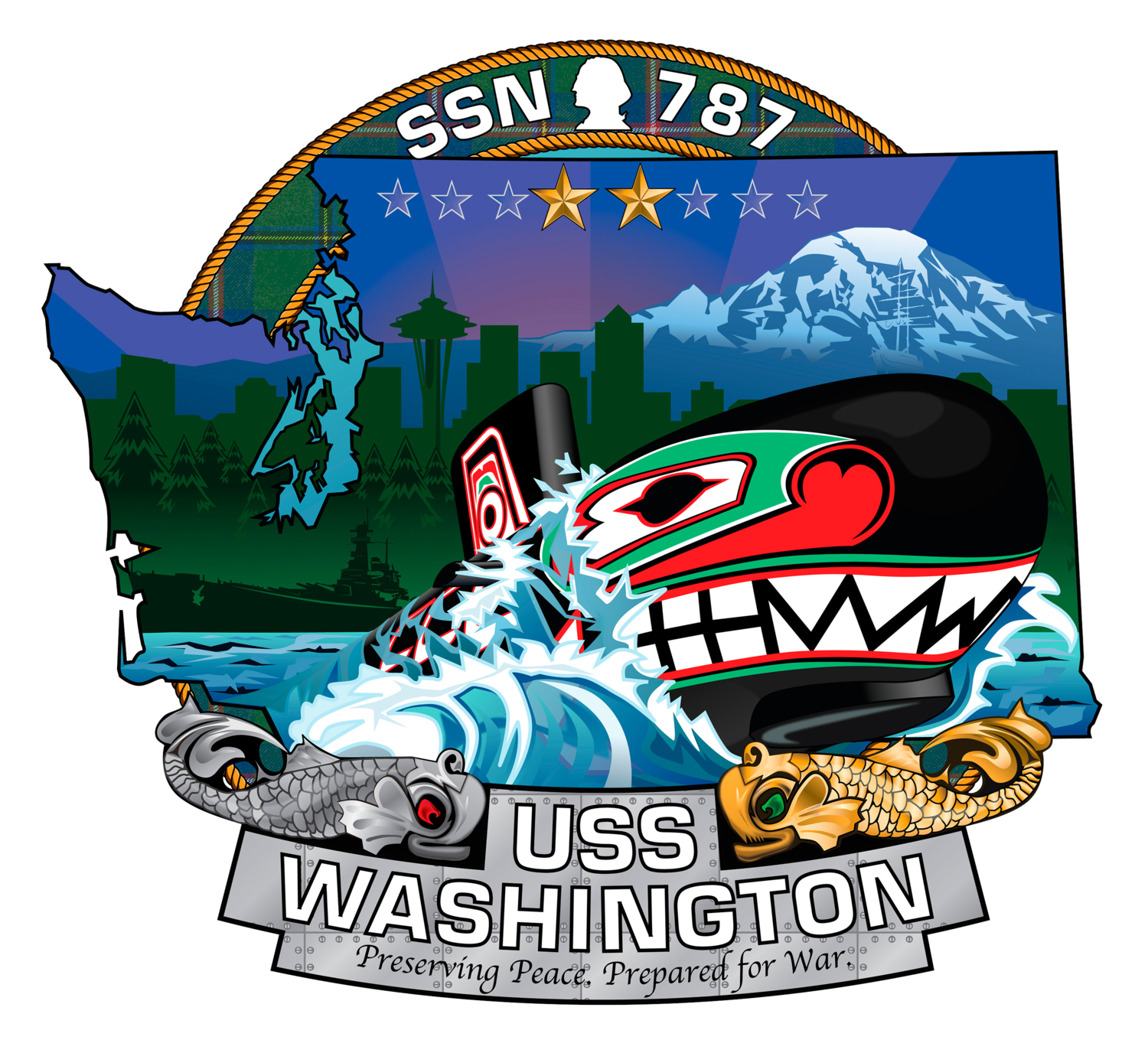
- Badge

General characteristics
- Class & type: Virginia-class submarine
- Displacement: 7800 tons light, 7800 tons full
- Length: 114.9 meters (377 feet)
- Beam: 10.3 meters (34 feet)
- Propulsion: 1 × S9G PWR nuclear reactor 280,000 shp (210 MW), HEU 93%; 2 × steam turbines 40,000 shp (30 MW); 1 × single shaft pump-jet propulsor; 1 × secondary propulsion motor
- Speed: 25 knots (46 km/h)
- Range: Essentially unlimited distance; 33 years
- Test depth: greater than 800 feet (240 meters)
- Complement: 134 officers and men

USS Washington (SSN-787) is a Virginia-class nuclear powered attack submarine of the United States Navy. Launched in 2016 and commissioned in 2017, she is named for the U.S. state of Washington.

== History ==
The contract to build the submarine was awarded to Huntington Ingalls Industries in partnership with the Electric Boat division of General Dynamics in Newport News, Virginia, on 22 December 2008. The boat became the fourth of the Block III submarines featuring a revised bow, including some technology from Ohio-class SSGNs.

Construction began on 2 September 2011 at Newport News Shipbuilding in Virginia. On 13 April 2012, Secretary of the Navy Ray Mabus announced that SSN-787 would be named after the State of Washington, which was celebrated during a naming ceremony in Seattle on 7 February 2013. The Navy christened Washington on 5 March 2016, during a ceremony at Newport News Shipbuilding. Her keel was laid down on 22 November 2014. She was launched on 13 April 2016, sponsored by Elisabeth Mabus (daughter of Secretary Mabus), and commissioned on 7 October 2017. At the time of her commissioning, she was under the command of Commander Gabriel Cavazos.

In March 2020, Cavazos was relieved by Commander Eric Astle in a ceremony at Naval Station Norfolk. At the time, she had recently returned from a deployment covering approximately 45,000 nautical miles (52,000 mi; 83,000 km) with stops in Rota, Spain, and Faslane, Scotland.

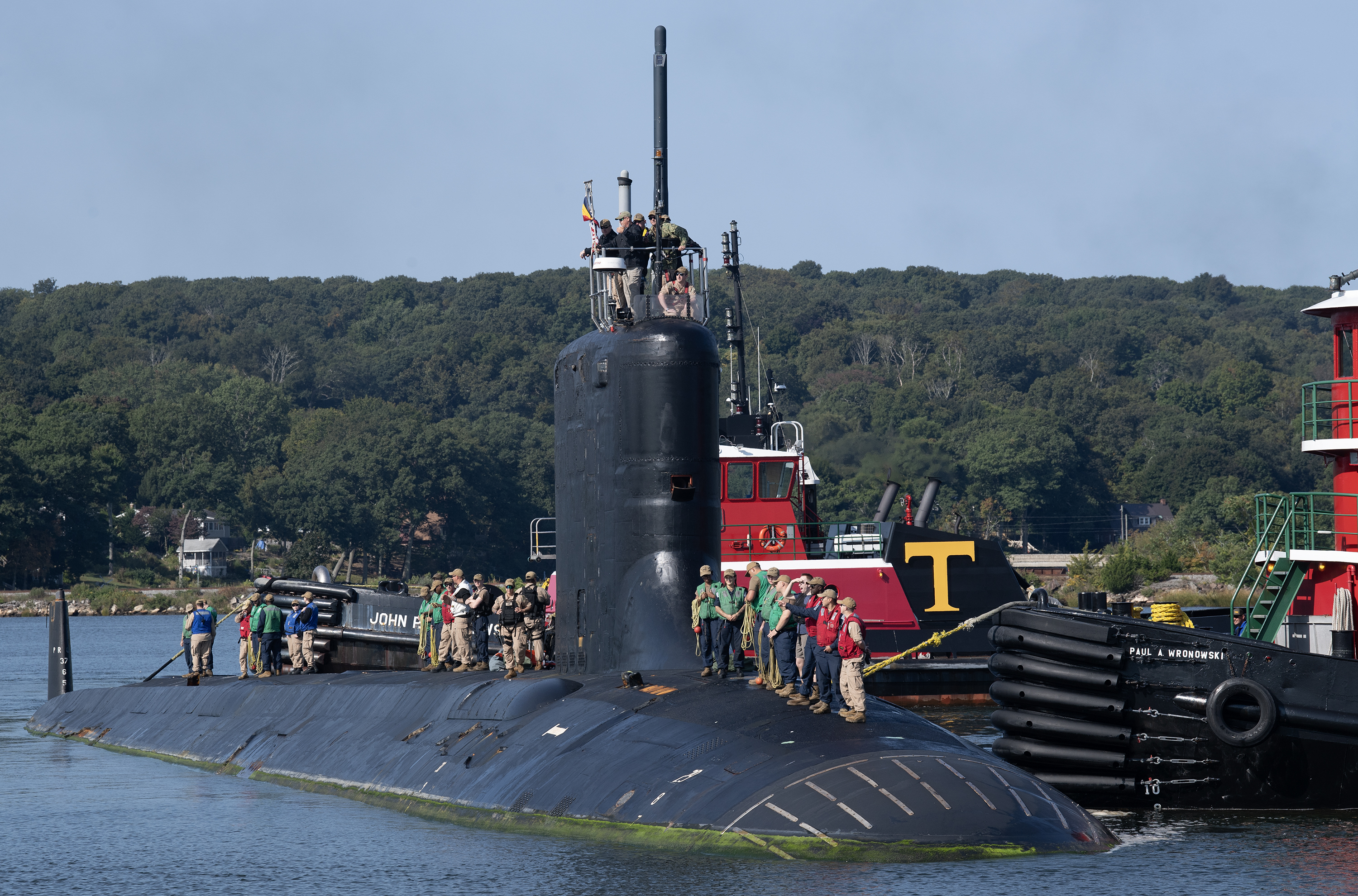
Washington in September 2024

In late February 2022, Washington returned to Naval Station Norfolk after a deployment of 192 days of sustained operations, covering over 37,000 nautical miles (43,000 mi; 69,000 km), with stops in Haakonsvern, Norway; Tromsø, Norway; Faslane, Scotland; and Brest, France. News reports indicated she was in Tromsø during January 11–14.

In July 2022, Astle was relieved by Commander Clint Christofk in a ceremony at Naval Station Norfolk. At the time, it was noted that the boat had undergone five months of emergency dry-dock repairs while under Astle's command.

In December 2023, Washington returned to Naval Station Norfolk after a six-month deployment covering over 37,000 nautical miles, with stops in Scotland and Norway. In July 2024, Christofk was relieved by Commander Keith Turnbull in a ceremony at Naval Station Norfolk. At that ceremony, Washington was awarded a Presidential Unit Citation for completing "three demanding missions vital to national security that resulted in obtaining sensitive and unique intelligence information."

In mid-September 2024, Washington made a stop at Submarine Base New London in Groton, Connecticut. In late September 2024, the boat arrived at Portsmouth Naval Shipyard in Kittery, Maine, for scheduled maintenance and system upgrades. She had not deployed since her return to Norfolk in December 2023.

== Crest ==
The crest contains images including Mount Rainier, the Seattle skyline, evergreen trees, and silhouettes of two previous USS Washingtons.

The central image is of the submarine, coming forth from the waters of the Puget Sound. The paint scheme is of local Native American art depicting an orca, the state's official marine mammal.

Along the top of the state border, six hollow stars represent previous naval vessels named for George Washington with two solid-gold stars representing the previous ships named for the state of Washington.

At the bottom, silver and gold submarine dolphins, represent the enlisted and officer Submarine Warfare insignia, respectively, sit atop a block of battleship armor plating.

The motto, "Preserving Peace, Prepared for War", is derived from a quote from George Washington, "To be prepared for war is one of the most effective means of preserving peace." (Note: See also Si vis pacem, para bellum.)

Set behind the state is a ring adorned with the official Washington state tartan colored green (for the evergreen forests), blue (for the lakes, rivers, and ocean), white (for the snow-capped mountains), red (for the apple and cherry crops), yellow (for the wheat and grain crops), and black (for the 1980 eruption of Mount St. Helens).

== Battlecry ==
Orca, more commonly known as killer whales, are referred to as "blackfish" by the Native Americans of the Pacific Northwest. This led to the crew unofficially referring to USS Washington as "The Blackfish", and gave rise to the battlecry "Fear the Blackfish".
