= USS New Hampshire (SSN-778) =

US Navy Virginia-class submarine

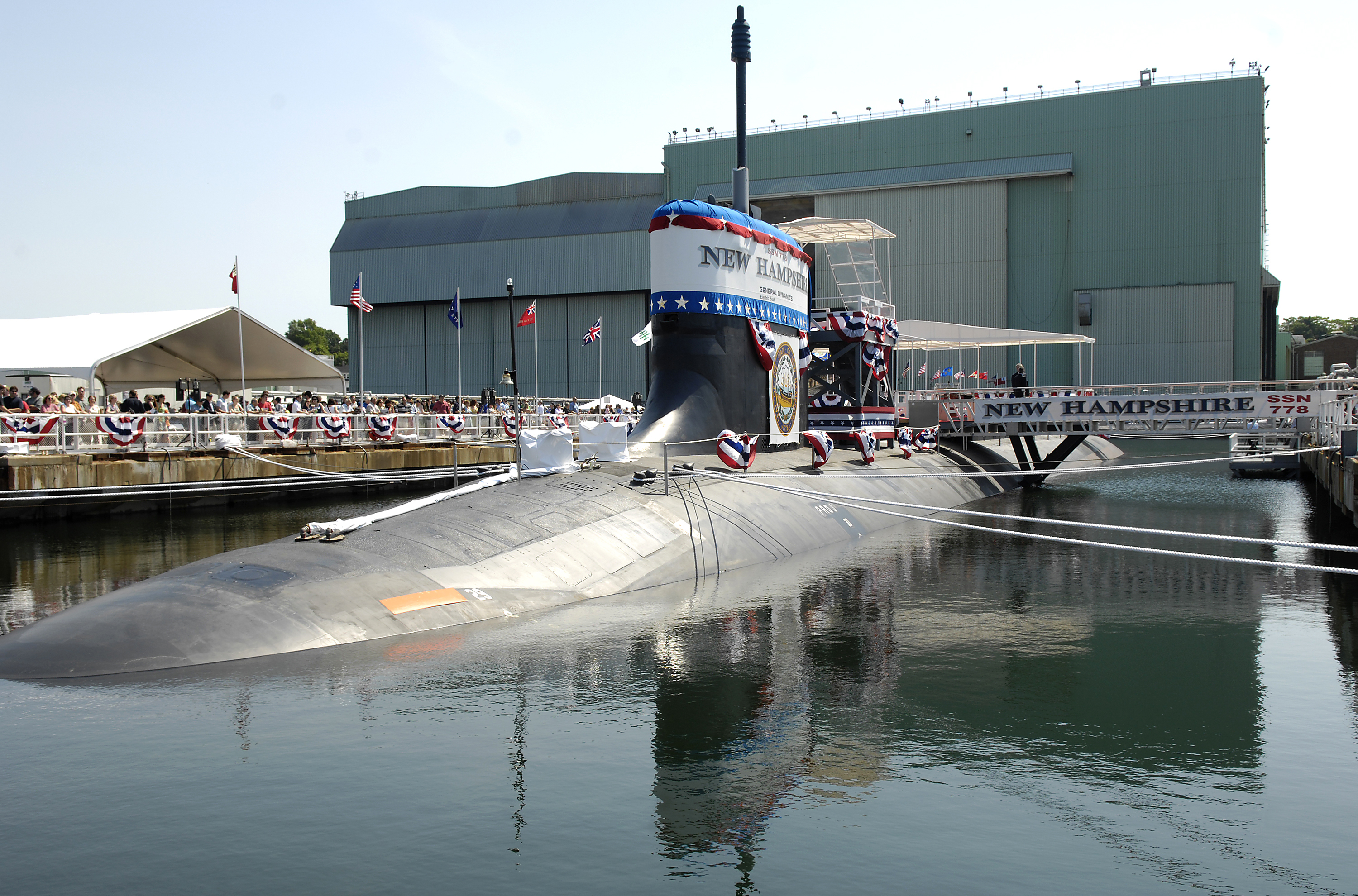
- Pre-commissioning Unit New Hampshire (SSN-778) sits moored to the pier at General Dynamics Electric Boat shipyard moments before her christening ceremony commenced.

History

United States
- Name: USS New Hampshire
- Namesake: The State of New Hampshire
- Ordered: 14 August 2003
- Builder: General Dynamics Electric Boat
- Laid down: 30 April 2007
- Launched: 21 February 2008
- Christened: 21 June 2008
- Commissioned: 25 October 2008
- Home port: Norfolk, Virginia
- Identification: MMSI number: 369970008
- Motto: "Live Free or Die"
- Status: in active service
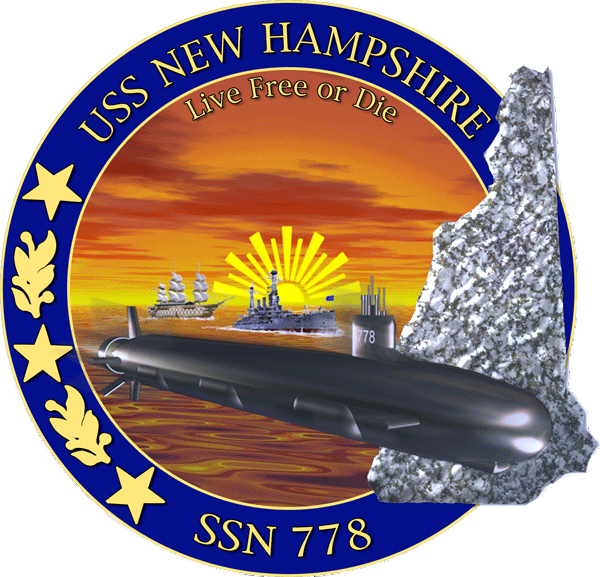
- Badge

General characteristics
- Class & type: Virginia-class submarine
- Displacement: 7,800 tons
- Length: 377 ft (115 m)
- Beam: 34 ft (10 m)
- Propulsion: 1 × S9G PWR nuclear reactor 280,000 shp (210 MW), HEU 93%; 2 × steam turbines 40,000 shp (30 MW); 1 × single shaft pump-jet propulsor; 1 × secondary propulsion motor
- Speed: 25 knots (46 km/h)
- Range: Essentially unlimited distance; 33 years
- Test depth: 800 ft (244 m)
- Complement: 134 (14 officers, 120 enlisted)
- Armament: 12 × VLS (BGM-109 Tomahawk cruise missile) & 4 × 533 mm torpedo tubes (Mk-48 torpedo)

USS New Hampshire (SSN-778), a Virginia-class nuclear-powered attack submarine, is the fourth vessel of the United States Navy to be named for the state of New Hampshire. She is the first of the Virginia-class Block-II submarines to enter service. Her name was awarded to the submarine after a letter-writing campaign by the third-graders from Garrison Elementary School and sixth graders from Dover Middle School in Dover to their members of Congress, the state governor, and the Secretary of the Navy.

== History ==
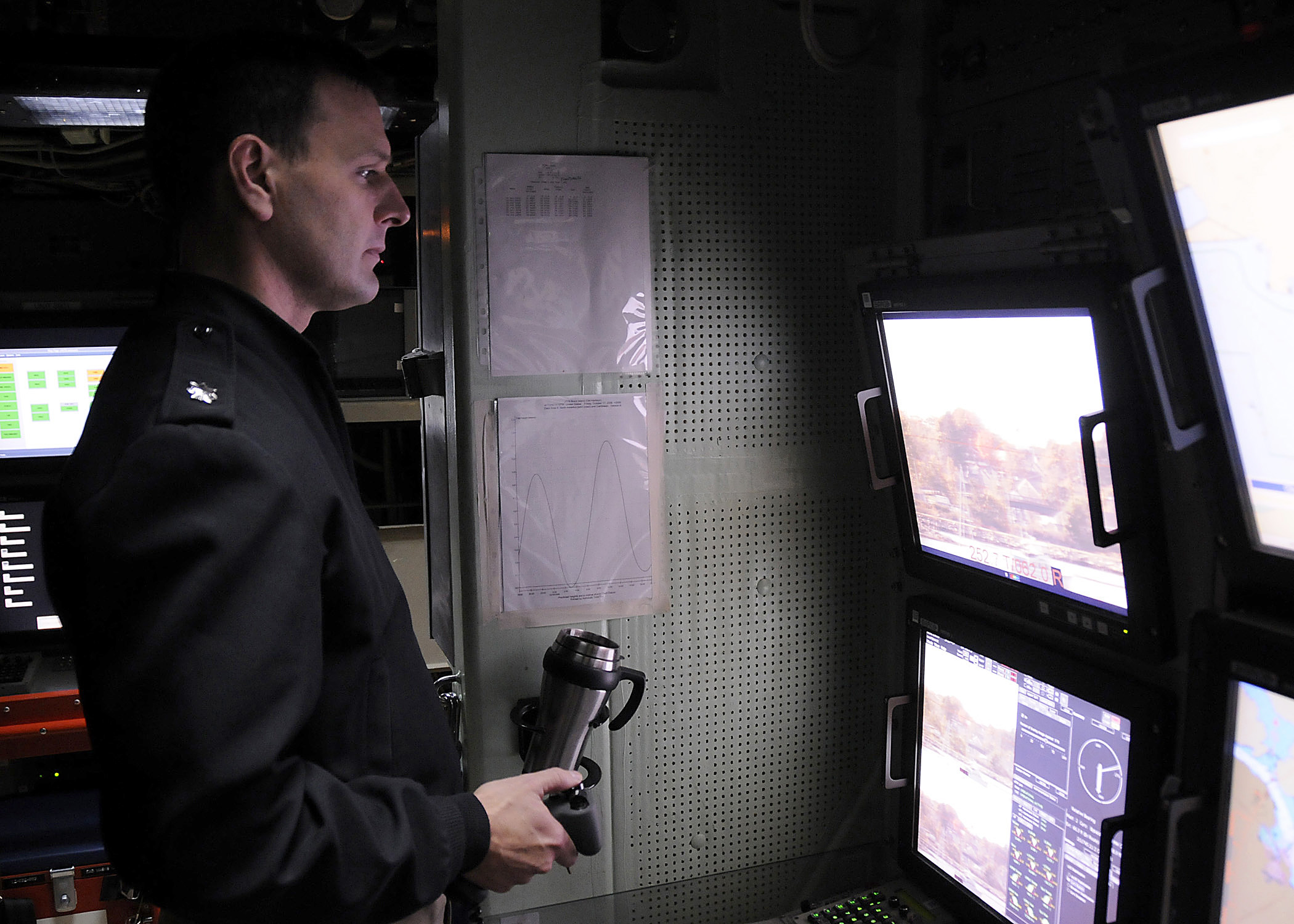
The photonics suite on New Hampshire

The contract to build her was awarded to the Electric Boat Division of General Dynamics Corporation in Groton, Connecticut, on 14 August 2003. Construction began in January 2004. A keel-laying ceremony for the submarine was held at Electric Boat's Quonset Point facility in North Kingstown, Rhode Island, on 30 April 2007.

=== Sponsor ===
The ship's sponsor was Cheryl McGuinness of Portsmouth, New Hampshire, the widow of Thomas McGuinness, co-pilot of American Airlines Flight 11, who died in the September 11, 2001 attacks when the jet was flown into the North Tower of the World Trade Center.

=== Launched ===
The submarine was launched on 21 February 2008 and christened four months later, on 21 June 2008 in Groton, Connecticut, eight months ahead of schedule and $54 million under budget. New Hampshire finished sea trials and was delivered to the Navy on 28 August 2008. The boat was commissioned in a ceremony at the Portsmouth Naval Shipyard in Kittery, Maine, on 25 October 2008.

Although she is the fourth vessel to carry this name, one of her predecessors, BB-70, was authorized but cancelled before keel laying.

== Equipment failure while on deployment ==
During the week of 13 March 2011, while on a mission under the Arctic ice cap, New Hampshire suffered an oxygen generator failure. This failure required the submarine to surface through the ice. The crew had used oxygen candles to make oxygen until the boat surfaced. United Technologies, the company responsible for building the oxygen generator, dispatched a representative with needed replacement parts to the submarine by way of a temporary ice camp, to assist the crew in repairing the problem.
