= USS New Mexico (SSN-779) =

US Navy Virginia-class submarine

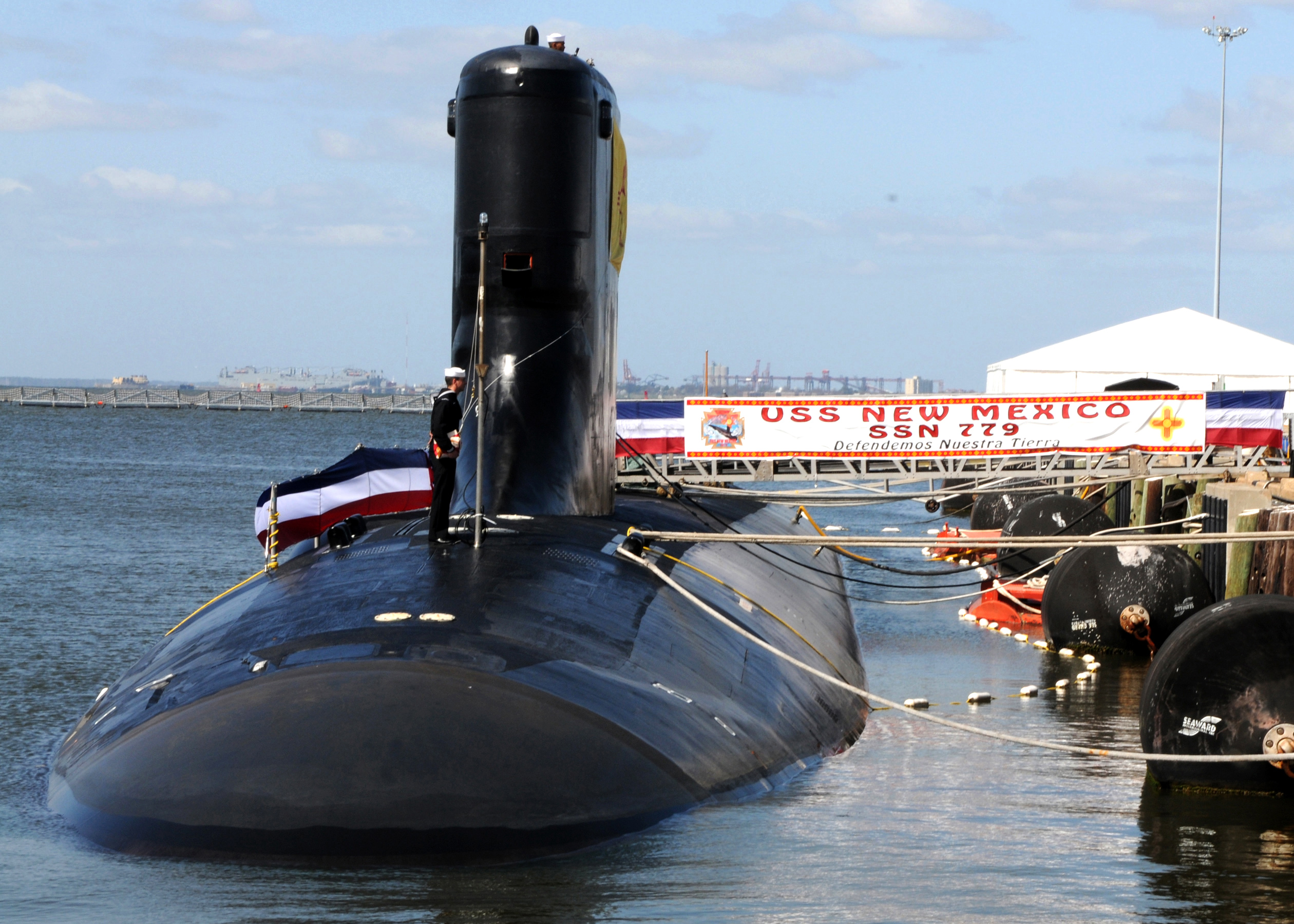
- The commissioning of New Mexico on 13 December 2008.

History

United States
- Name: USS New Mexico
- Namesake: The State of New Mexico
- Ordered: 14 August 2003
- Builder: Newport News Shipbuilding
- Laid down: 12 April 2008
- Launched: 18 January 2009
- Christened: 13 December 2008
- Commissioned: 27 March 2010
- Home port: Norfolk, Virginia
- Motto: Defendemos nuestra tierra (Spanish: "We defend our land")
- Status: In active service with Submarine Squadron 6
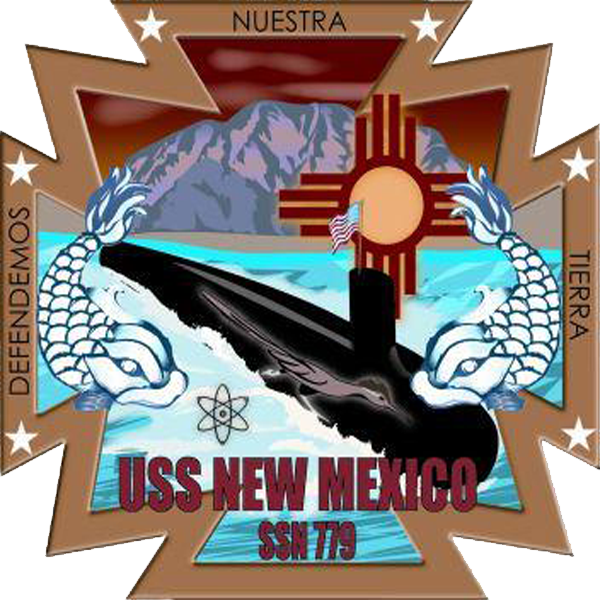
- Badge

General characteristics
- Class & type: Virginia-class submarine
- Displacement: 7,900 tonnes (7,800 long tons)
- Length: 377 ft (115 m)
- Beam: 34 ft (10 m)
- Propulsion: 1 × S9G PWR nuclear reactor 280,000 shp (210 MW), HEU 93%; 2 × steam turbines 40,000 shp (30 MW); 1 × single shaft pump-jet propulsor; 1 × secondary propulsion motor
- Speed: 25 knots (46 km/h)+
- Range: Essentially unlimited distance; 33 years
- Complement: 130
- Armament: 12 × VLS (BGM-109 Tomahawk cruise missile) 4 × 533mm torpedo tubes (Mk-48 ADCAP torpedo)

USS New Mexico (SSN-779) is a Virginia-class nuclear powered fast-attack submarine of the United States Navy. She is the second U.S. warship named for the 47th state, after the early twentieth century super-dreadnought, USS New Mexico (BB-40).

New Mexico is the sixth vessel of her class, which is intended to replace the older Los Angeles-class. She represents the most advanced submarine model in the U.S. Navy, incorporating the latest technologies in stealth, propulsion, intelligence gathering, and weaponry. New Mexico is designed to carry out a wide variety of blue water and littoral operations, including anti-ship warfare, surveillance, and reconnaissance.

Commissioned in March 2010, New Mexico has undertaken several naval exercises and deployments. In March 2014, New Mexico became the first Virginia-class submarine to surface at the North Pole. Her homeport is Naval Station Norfolk in Virginia.

== Construction ==
New Mexico is the Navy's sixth Virginia-class submarine. Construction was awarded on 14 August 2003 to Northrop Grumman Newport News, which built the submarine through a joint agreement between General Dynamics Electric Boat (GDEB). She was the second of six Block II submarines that were built through an improved, cost-saving method.

Construction began in January 2004 at the Electric Boat Corporation, Groton, Connecticut and Quonset Point, Rhode Island facilities, for the construction of the straight sections. The individual components were shipped to Newport News for final assembly. Her keel was laid down on 12 April 2008, and on 18 May 2008 the final hull welds were completed. She was christened on 13 December 2008, with Cindy Giambastiani, the boat's sponsor and wife of Admiral Edmund Giambastiani. Representative Heather Wilson of the First Congressional District of New Mexico was present as the keynote speaker.

New Mexico was launched on 18 January 2009 and originally scheduled for delivery in August 2009. The date of delivery was pushed back to November and the planned commissioning date postponed to early 2010 after mechanical problems were found with her torpedo room weapons-handling system. New Mexico completed builder's trials at the end of November 2009 and was delivered on 29 December 2009, four months ahead of the contract delivery date. She was commissioned on 27 March 2010.

== Operational history ==
Guided video tour of USS New Mexico in 2020

In February 2012, New Mexico rendezvoused with Royal Navy submarine HMS Astute (S119) underwater in the Atlantic Undersea Test and Evaluation Center, Bahamas, for a series of war games. Present aboard each submarine were the head of the Royal Navy, Admiral Sir Mark Stanhope and the head of the United States Navy, Admiral Jonathan W. Greenert in a historic underwater meeting between the leaders of both navies.

== Ship's crest ==
The crest of New Mexico was designed in January 2007 by Emilee L. Sena, a senior at St. Pius X High School in Albuquerque, New Mexico. Her winning design was chosen by the submarine's crew out of 180 submissions from schools throughout the state.

The design incorporates an image of a New Mexico sunset, which casts the Sandia Mountains in the pink shade for which they are named. The red in the upper right corner represents the red in the U.S. flag, which symbolizes valor and the blood that has been sacrificed in battle. The blue in the lower left corner represents the blue of the American flag, symbolizing justice, vigilance, and perseverance. The Zia symbol represents the state flag, as well as the prominence of the sun in New Mexico; the emblem is unique in reflecting the influence of Native American people in New Mexico, as the design is commonly found in indigenous art, such as blankets and pots.

The dolphins on the sides are symbols for naval submarines; they shine with a white color to represent the white of the U.S. flag, which in turn symbolizes purity and innocence. The submarine in the center represents a Virginia-class submarine, with bow wave signifying motion. Naval officers are depicted above the vessel holding a flag. The bird along the hull is a roadrunner (Geococcyx), the state bird of New Mexico, known as a fast, agile, and fearless hunter. The gold in the border symbolizes the naval qualities of courage, prosperity, wisdom, and confidence.

The atom symbol in the bottom left corner has two meanings: It represents the nuclear-powered nature of the Virginia-class submarines and the fact many advancements in nuclear science have taken place in New Mexico at Sandia National Laboratories (SNL) and Los Alamos National Laboratory (LANL).

In honor of those who serve aboard the New Mexico, the football players of New Mexico State University wore the crest on the back of their helmets for the 2010 football season.
