= USS John Warner =

US Navy Virginia-class submarine

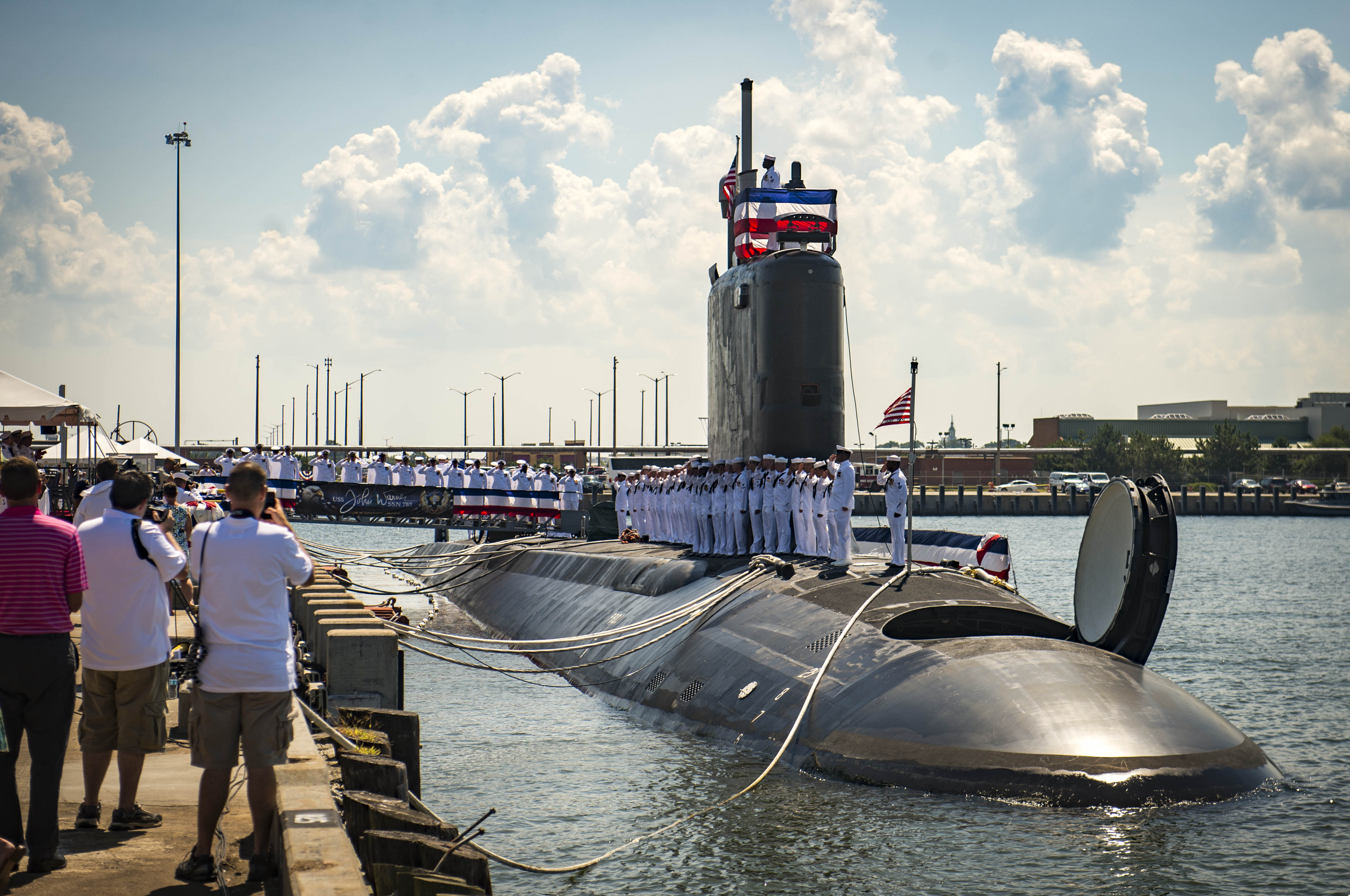
- John Warner during the commissioning ceremony.

History

United States
- Name: USS John Warner
- Namesake: John Warner
- Awarded: 22 December 2008
- Builder: GD Electric Boat and HII Newport News
- Laid down: 16 March 2013
- Sponsored by: Jeanne Warner
- Christened: 6 September 2014
- Launched: 10 September 2014
- Commissioned: 1 August 2015
- Home port: Naval Station Norfolk, Virginia
- Identification: SSN-785
- Motto: Legati ad Defendam Libertatem; ("On a Mission to Protect Freedom")
- Status: in active service
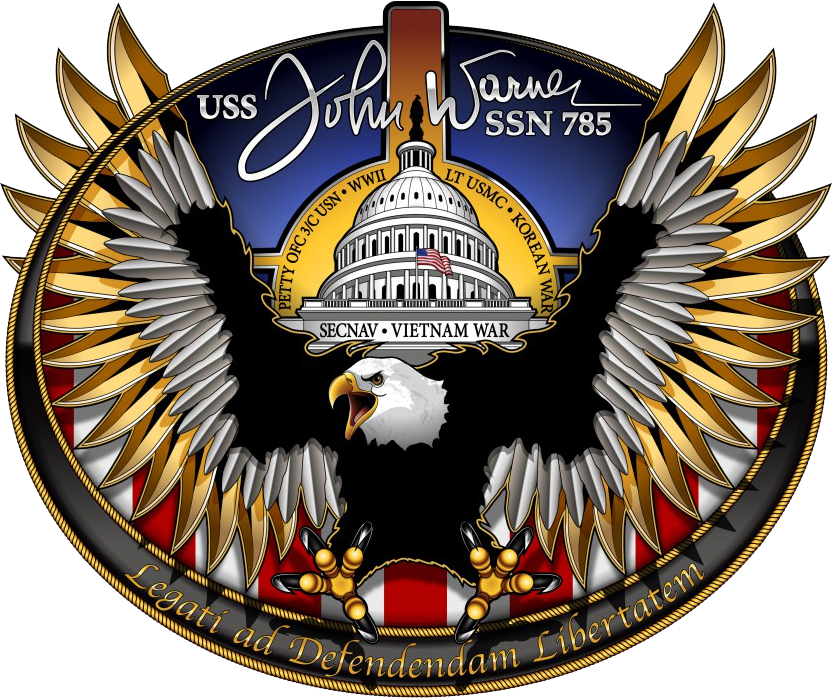
- Badge

General characteristics
- Class & type: Virginia-class submarine
- Displacement: 7,800 tonnes (7,700 long tons)
- Length: 114.9 m (377 ft)
- Beam: 10.3 m (34 ft)
- Installed power: S9G reactor; 33 year service life
- Propulsion: Pump-jet propulsor 40,000 shp (30,000 kW)
- Speed: 25 knots (46 km/h; 29 mph)
- Range: Essentially unlimited distance
- Complement: 132 Sailors
- Crew: 15 Officers and 117 Enlisted
- Armament: 12 × VLS (BGM-109 Tomahawk cruise missile) & 4 × 21 inch (533 mm) torpedo tubes (Mk-48 torpedo)

USS John Warner (SSN-785) is a nuclear powered Virginia-class attack submarine of the United States Navy. She is the first in the class to be named after a person; the first 11 Virginia-class subs were named after states. John Warner was originally to be built by the Electric Boat division of General Dynamics in Groton, Connecticut, but the contract was later transferred to Huntington Ingalls Industries Newport News Shipbuilding. She is the second of the Block III subs, which have a revised bow and some technology from Ohio-class cruise missile submarines. The vessel supports 40 weapons, special operations forces, unmanned undersea vehicles, and the Advanced SEAL Delivery System (ASDS).

The name was announced on 8 January 2009, five days after John Warner, a Republican from Virginia, retired after serving 30 years as a United States senator, making John Warner the 13th U.S. Navy vessel to be named for a living person in the last hundred years.

Construction began on 29 April 2009 with the keel laying ceremony being held on 16 March 2013. Because of the modular construction sequence, the submarine was reportedly already about 59% complete before the official keel laying. The submarine was christened on 6 September 2014. John Warner was commissioned on 1 August 2015 with Commander Dan Caldwell in command.

On 14 April 2018, while on her first deployment, USS John Warner took part in targeted strikes against Syrian military facilities. She fired six Tomahawk cruise missiles, in what was believed to be the first combat use of her class of submarines.
