= USS Columbus (SSN-762) =

Los Angeles-class nuclear-powered attack submarine of the US Navy

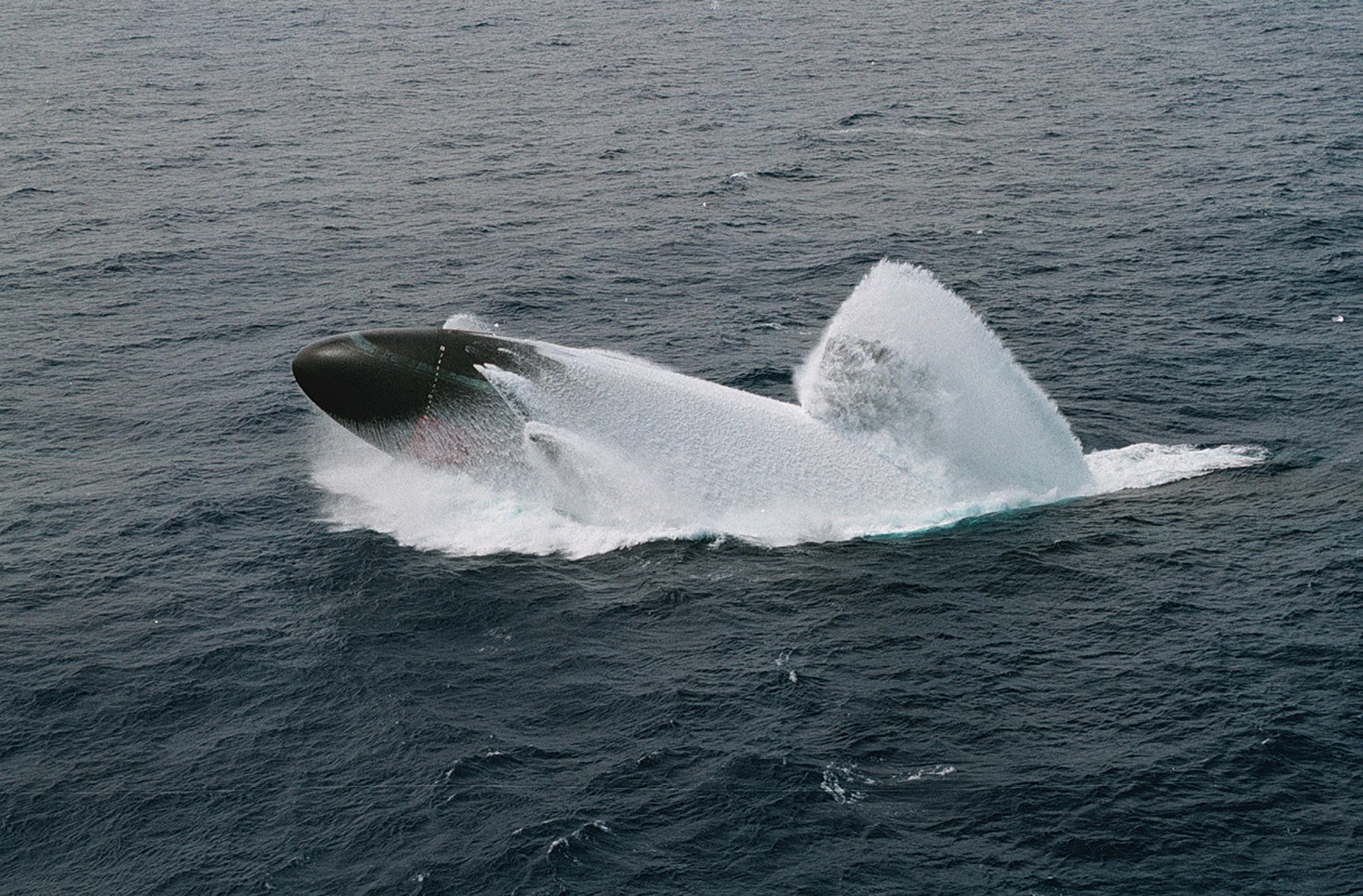
- USS Columbus (SSN-762)

History

United States
- Name: USS Columbus
- Namesake: The City of Columbus, Ohio
- Awarded: 21 March 1986
- Builder: General Dynamics Electric Boat
- Laid down: 9 January 1991
- Launched: 1 August 1992
- Sponsored by: Margaret DeMars
- Commissioned: 24 July 1993
- Home port: Naval Station Pearl Harbor (Currently Newport News Shipbuilding for overhaul.)
- Motto: All Seas Are Navigable
- Status: In active service
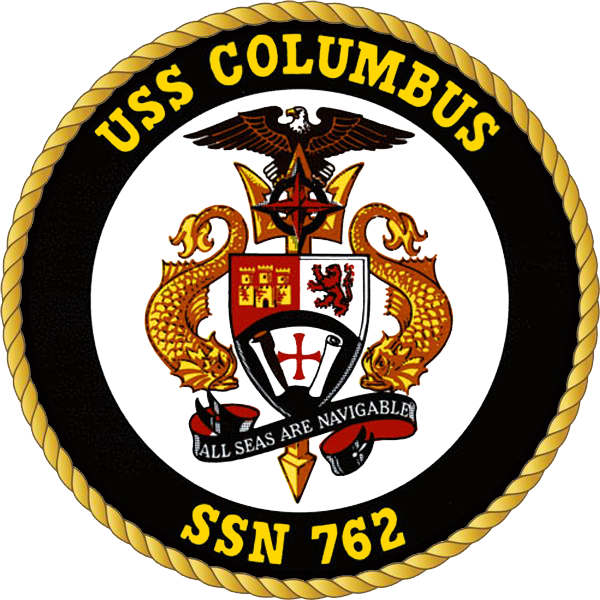
- Badge

General characteristics
- Class & type: Los Angeles-class submarine
- Displacement: 6,000 long tons (6,096 t) light; 6,927 long tons (7,038 t) full; 927 long tons (942 t) dead
- Length: 110.3 m (361 ft 11 in)
- Beam: 10 m (32 ft 10 in)
- Draft: 9.4 m (30 ft 10 in)
- Propulsion: 1 × S6G PWR nuclear reactor with D2W core (165 MW), HEU 93.5%; 2 × steam turbines (33,500) shp; 1 × shaft; 1 × secondary propulsion motor 325 hp (242 kW)
- Speed: Surfaced:20 knots (23 mph; 37 km/h); Submerged: +20 knots (23 mph; 37 km/h) (official)
- Complement: 12 officers, 98 men
- Sensors & processing systems: BQQ-5 passive sonar, BQS-15 detecting and ranging sonar, WLR-8 fire control radar receiver, WLR-9 acoustic receiver for detection of active search sonar and acoustic homing torpedoes, BRD-7 radio direction finder
- Armament: 4 × 21 in (533 mm) bow tubes, 10 Mk48 ADCAP torpedo reloads, Tomahawk land attack missile block 3 SLCM range 1,700 nautical miles (3,100 km), Harpoon anti–surface ship missile range 70 nautical miles (130 km), mine laying Mk67 mobile Mk60 captor mines

USS Columbus (hull number SSN-762) is a Los Angeles-class nuclear powered fast attack submarine and the second vessel of the United States Navy to be named for Columbus, Ohio. The contract to build her was awarded to the Electric Boat Division of General Dynamics Corporation in Groton, Connecticut, on 21 March 1986 and her keel was laid down on 9 January 1991. She was launched on 1 August 1992 sponsored by Mrs. Margaret DeMars, wife of Admiral Bruce DeMars and commissioned on 24 July 1993.

== Operational history ==
Columbus completed a Post Shipyard Availability in June 1994 in Groton, Connecticut after initial construction and shakedown operations. In September 1994, the submarine conducted an interfleet transfer to Pearl Harbor, Hawaii and joined the U.S. Pacific Fleet Submarine Force. Columbus deployed to the Western Pacific in late 1995 through early 1996 and conducted a variety of operations as a unit of the Seventh Fleet along the way making port visits in Hong Kong, Subic Bay, Guam, and Yokosuka, Japan.

Columbus was the first submarine equipped with the BYG-1 Fire Control System in December 2002. Two successful test launches of Tactical Tomahawk (Block IV) cruise missiles were conducted in late May 2003 from Columbus, while underway in the Pacific Ocean off the coast of Southern California. Columbus departed Pearl Harbor for another western Pacific deployment in late 2003, and visited Jinhae-gu, South Korea, Singapore, and Japan while taking part in Annual-Ex 2003, an exercise with various units of the Japanese Maritime Self-Defense Force.

In mid-April 2006 seven Columbus crewmen were charged with a variety of offenses, including assault, dereliction of duty, and hazing, for alleged attacks on two of their shipmates. The accused range from a petty officer third class (E-4) to a senior chief (E-8). A complete report on the situation was completed on 30 May. On 13 June, the Navy announced the dismissal of Columbus's commanding officer, Commander Charles Marquez because of concerns about his "ability to establish and maintain appropriate standards of professional conduct, provide the crew a safe, positive, professional environment in which to work, and maintain good order and discipline". Captain Brian McIlvaine, former commanding officer of USS Ohio (SSGN-726), replaced Marquez temporarily. After a few months in command CAPT McIlvaine was replaced with CDR James Doody. At the end of a DMP (depot modernization period) In Bremerton, Washington, Columbus relocated back to Pearl Harbor on 22 December 2006.

Following a modernization refit at the Puget Sound Naval Shipyard from 2004 to 2006 in Bremerton, Washington, Columbus returned to Submarine Squadron Seven in Pearl Harbor. She departed in March 2008 for a scheduled nine-month deployment with the Seventh Fleet. Columbus supported national taskings and theater security cooperation efforts while making port visits in Saipan, Guam, Okinawa, Sasebo, and Yokosuka, Japan. In January 2009 Columbus was awarded the Submarine Squadron Seven Battle Efficiency (Battle "E") award, given to the submarine crew that best demonstrates technical proficiency and continual mission readiness throughout the previous year.

In July 2009 Admiral Gary Roughead, the Chief of Naval Operations, announced that Columbus was the Pacific Fleet winner of the 2008 Arleigh Burke Fleet Trophy.

Columbus returned to Pearl Harbor, Hawaii, in August 2012 after completing a six-month deployment that included Seventh Fleet and national mission tasking along with port visits to Japan, South Korea, and Guam. Columbus arrived in the South Korean southern port city of Busan on 3 March 2014 as a part of a scheduled deployment in the Western Pacific. In September 2017, Columbus returned to Pearl Harbor from a six-month deployment having performing three national tasking periods, two theater operation periods, and a multinational exercise. Columbus also enjoyed four port visits, including Singapore and Guam.

Columbus is currently in year 9 of drydock in Newport News Shipbuilding for overhaul.

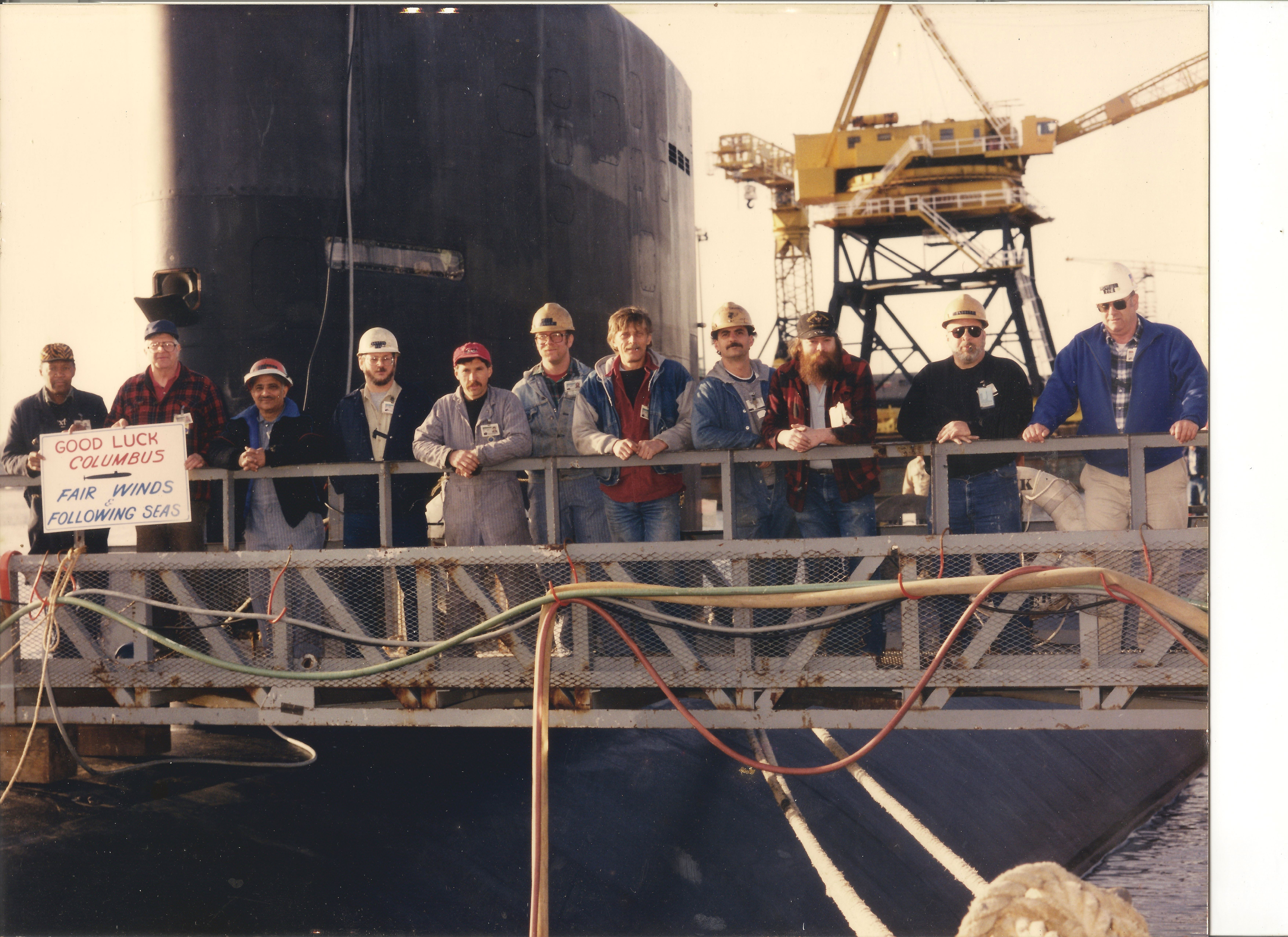
General Dynamics Electric Boat employees on the day of USS Columbus's Launch

== Awards ==
1995
Pacific Fleet Golden Anchor Award
Red Engineering "E"
Yellow Medical "M"
1996
Meritorious Unit Commendation
1997
Supply Blue "E"
1998
Pacific Fleet Silver Anchor Award
Engineering "E"
Deck Seamanship
2002
Red Green Navigational "N"
2003
Navy Unit Commendation
Tactical "T"
Communications "C"
2004
Medical "M"
2008
Department of the Navy Safety Excellence Award
Damage Control 'DC', Navigation 'N', Communications 'C', and Supply Blue 'E'
Arleigh Burke Fleet Trophy
Squadron 7 Battle "E" Efficiency Award
Meritorious Unit Commendation
2012
Squadron 7 Battle "E" Efficiency Award
2014
Communications 'C', Information Dominance 'I', and Weapons 'W'
