= USS Helena (SSN-725) =

Los Angeles-class nuclear-powered attack submarine of the US Navy

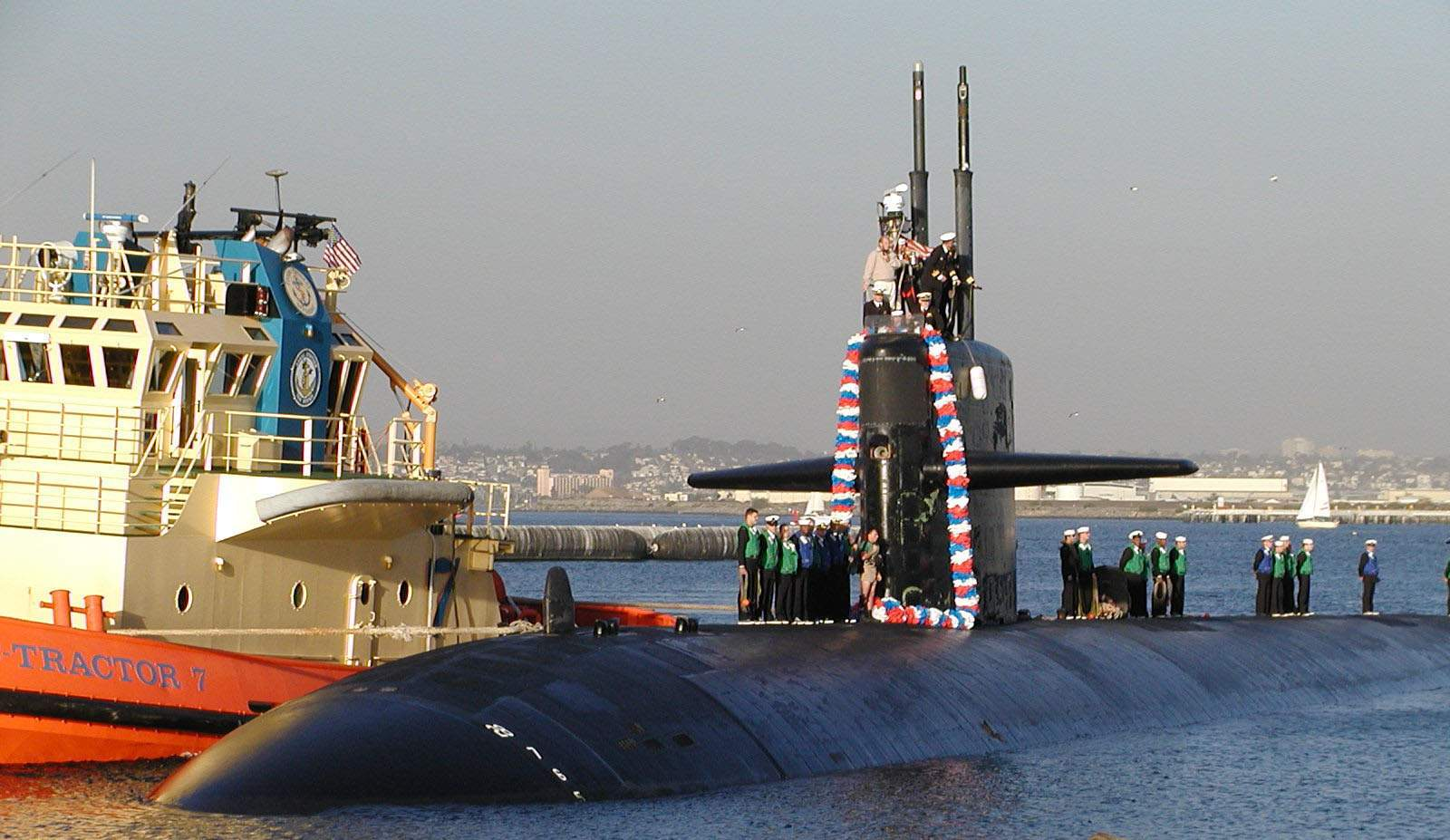
- USS Helena (SSN-725)

History

United States
- Name: Helena
- Namesake: The City of Helena, Montana
- Awarded: 19 April 1982
- Builder: General Dynamics Electric Boat
- Laid down: 28 March 1985
- Launched: 28 June 1986
- Sponsored by: Mrs. Jean Busey
- Commissioned: 11 July 1987
- Decommissioned: 25 July 2025
- Home port: PSNS Bremerton, WA
- Identification: UIC 21367
- Motto: Proud and Fearless
- Status: Decommissioned
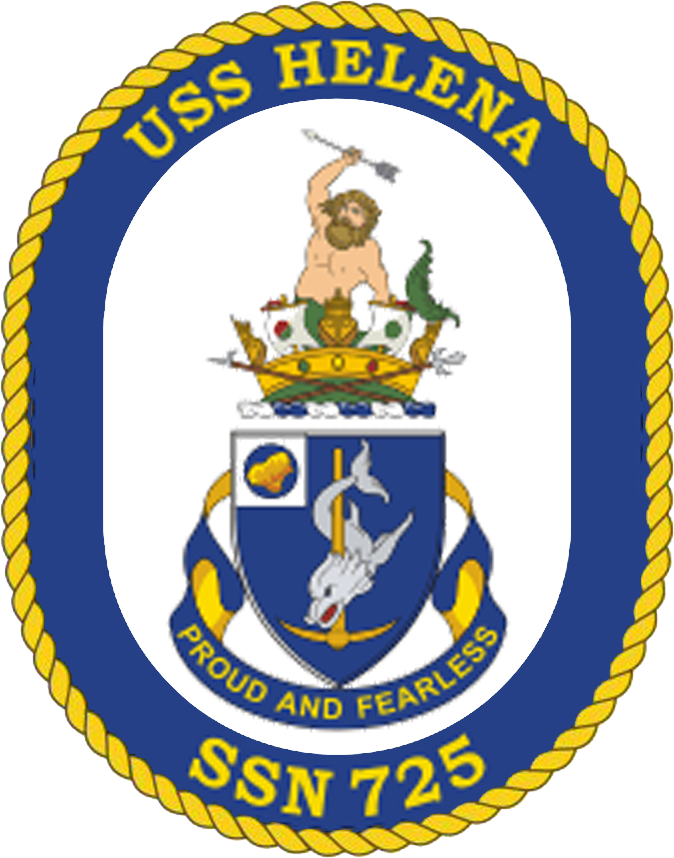
- Badge

General characteristics
- Class & type: Los Angeles-class submarine
- Displacement: 5,808 long tons (5,901 t) light; 6,203 long tons (6,303 t) full; 395 long tons (401 t) dead
- Length: 110.3 m (361 ft 11 in)
- Beam: 10 m (32 ft 10 in)
- Draft: 9.4 m (30 ft 10 in)
- Installed power: Steam Turbine (nuclear)
- Propulsion: 1 × S6G PWR nuclear reactor with D2W core (165 MW), HEU 93.5%; 2 × steam turbines (33,500) shp; 1 × shaft; 1 × secondary propulsion motor 325 hp (242 kW)
- Complement: 12 officers; 98 enlisted
- Armament: 4 × 21 in (533 mm) bow tubes, 10 Mk48 ADCAP torpedo reloads, Tomahawk land attack missile block 3 SLCM range 1,700 nautical miles (3,100 km), Harpoon anti–surface ship missile range 70 nautical miles (130 km), mine laying Mk67 mobile Mk60 captor mines

USS Helena (SSN-725), a Los Angeles-class submarine, was the fourth ship of the United States Navy to be named for Helena, Montana. The contract to build her was awarded to the Electric Boat Division of General Dynamics Corporation in Groton, Connecticut on 19 April 1982 and her keel was laid down on 28 March 1985. She was launched on 28 June 1986 sponsored by Mrs. Jean Busey, and commissioned on 11 July 1987. She was decommissioned on 25 July 2025 at the Naval Undersea Museum in Keyport, Washington.
