= USS Hyman G. Rickover (SSN-795) =

US Navy Virginia-class submarine

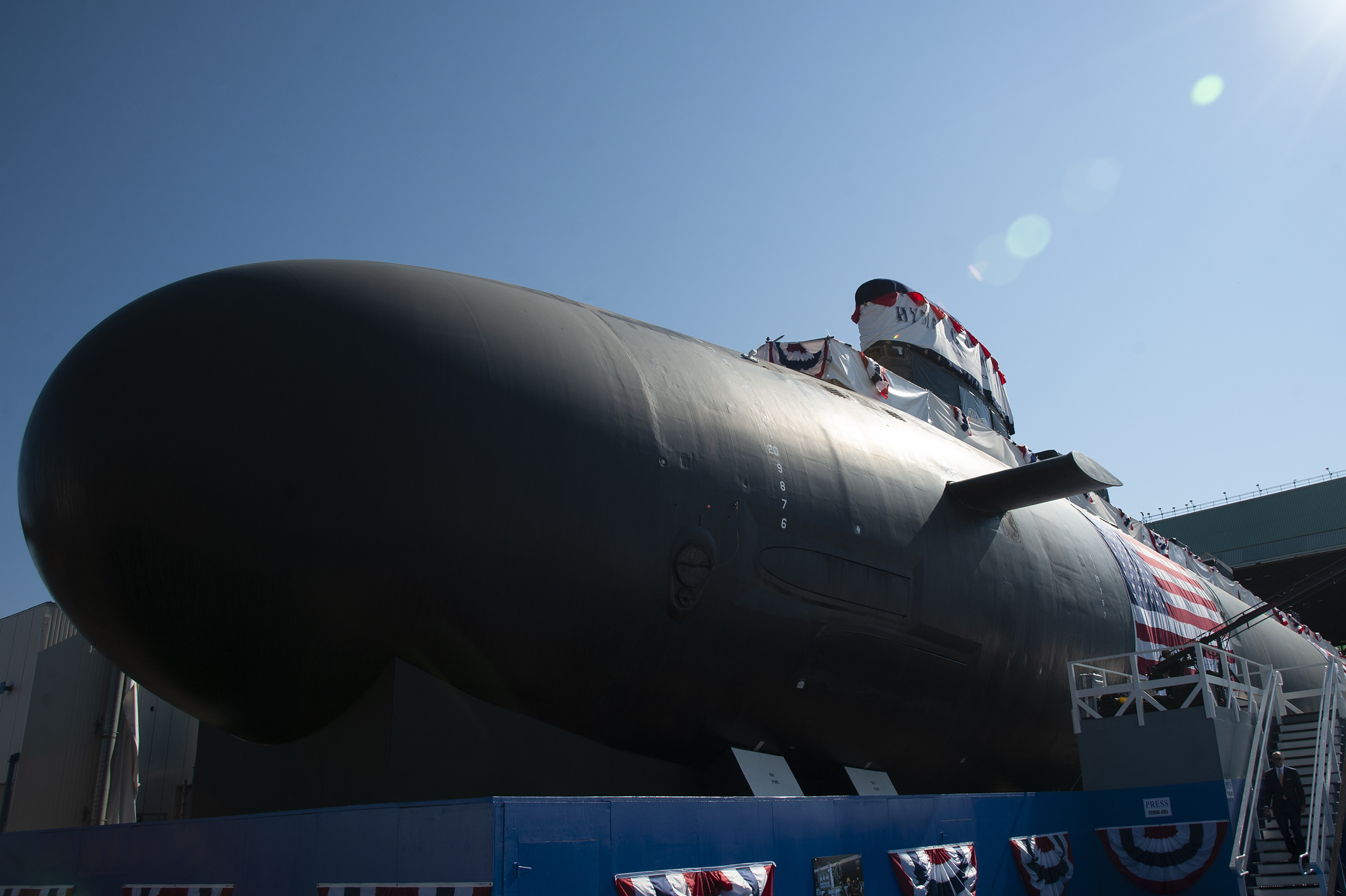
- USS Hyman G. Rickover (SSN-795) at General Dynamics Electric Boat shipyard facility in Groton, Conn., July 31, 2021.

History

United States
- Name: Hyman G. Rickover
- Namesake: Admiral Hyman G. Rickover
- Ordered: 28 April 2014
- Builder: General Dynamics Electric Boat, Groton, Connecticut
- Laid down: 11 May 2018
- Launched: 26 August 2021
- Sponsored by: Darleen Greenert
- Christened: 31 July 2021
- Commissioned: 14 October 2023
- Home port: Groton, Connecticut
- Identification: Hull symbol:SSN-795
- Motto: Committed to Excellence
- Status: In active service

General characteristics
- Class & type: Virginia-class submarine
- Displacement: 7,800 tons
- Length: 377 ft (115 m)
- Beam: 34 ft (10.4 m)
- Draft: 32 ft (9.8 m)
- Propulsion: S9G reactor, auxiliary diesel engine
- Speed: 25 knots (29 mph; 46 km/h)
- Test depth: greater than 800 ft (244 m)
- Complement: 134 officers and enlisted personnel
- Armament: 12 VPT tubes for BGM-109 Tomahawk, four 21 inch (530 mm) torpedo tubes for Mk-48 torpedoes

USS Hyman G. Rickover (SSN-795), is a Virginia-class nuclear-powered attack submarine of the United States Navy and the second such boat commemorating Admiral Hyman G. Rickover, pioneer of the nuclear navy. The boat's sponsor is Darleen Greenert, wife of then Chief of Naval Operations, Admiral Jonathan Greenert. Both the boat's name and her sponsor were announced by the Secretary of the Navy at a ceremony at the Washington Navy Yard on 9 January 2015. Hyman G. Rickover's christening occurred on 31 July 2021, and she was commissioned on 14 October 2023, during a ceremony at Naval Submarine Base New London, in Groton, Connecticut.

== Construction ==
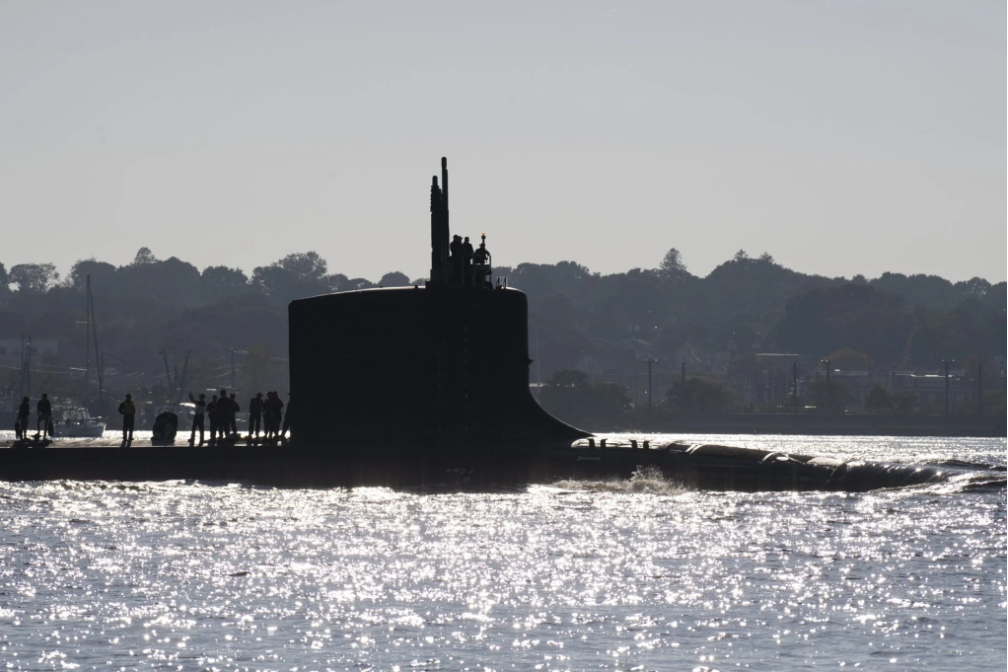
USS Hyman G. Rickover (SSN-795) completing her acceptance trials on 3 October 2023.

In October 2024, the Navy reported that welders at the Newport News Shipyard purposely circumvented proper procedures, resulting in substandard welds on the ship. However, the Navy also said the faulty welds did not impact the safety of the vessel.

== Ship's name ==
The first USS Hyman G. Rickover (SSN-709) was a Los Angeles-class submarine, and the only submarine of her class not to be named after an American city or town, while this submarine is the second of her class not to be named after a U.S. state (the first being USS John Warner).
