= USS New Jersey (SSN-796) =

US Navy Virginia-class submarine

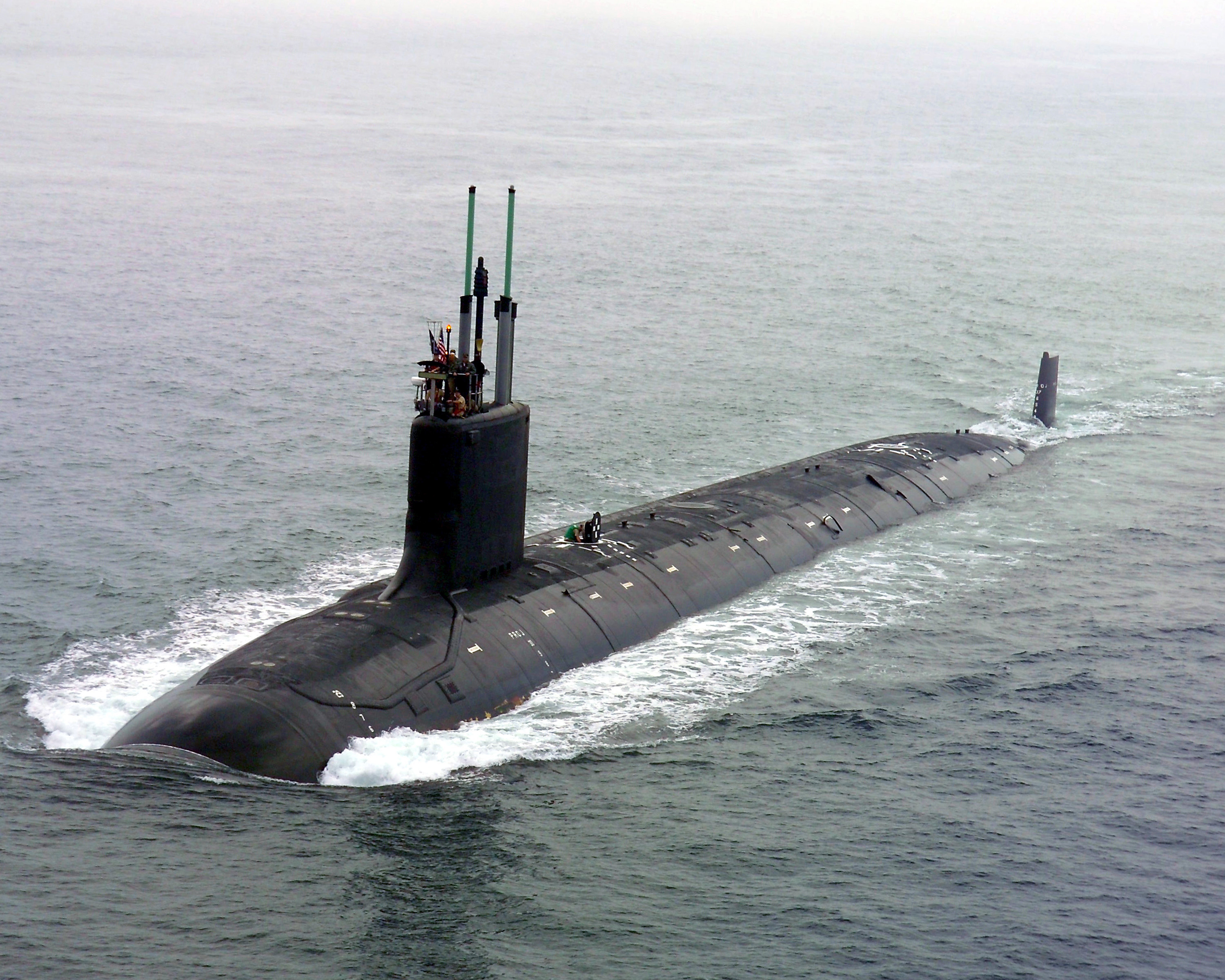
- The lead boat of the Virginia class, USS Virginia.

History

United States
- Namesake: State of New Jersey
- Ordered: 28 April 2014
- Builder: Newport News Shipbuilding, Newport News, Virginia
- Laid down: 25 March 2019
- Launched: 14 April 2022
- Sponsored by: Susan DiMarco
- Christened: 13 November 2021
- Commissioned: 14 September 2024
- Home port: Norfolk, Virginia
- Identification: Hull symbol:SSN-796
- Motto: Virtute Ignis pro Libertas; "Firepower for Freedom"
- Status: In active service
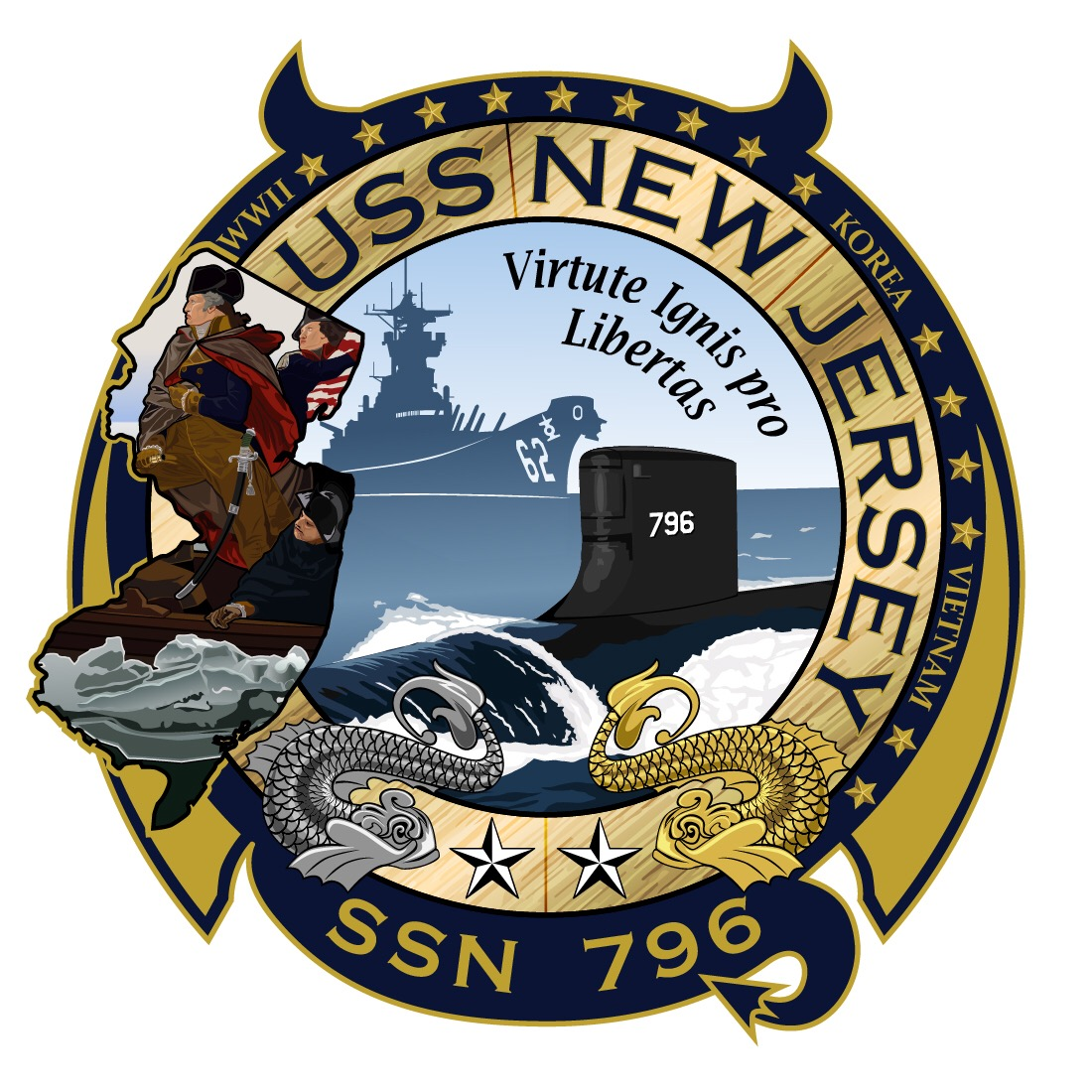
- Badge

General characteristics
- Class & type: Virginia-class submarine
- Displacement: 7,800 tons
- Length: 377 ft (115 m)
- Beam: 34 ft (10.4 m)
- Draft: 32 ft (9.8 m)
- Propulsion: S9G reactor auxiliary diesel engine
- Speed: 25 knots (46 km/h)
- Endurance: Can remain submerged for up to 3 months
- Test depth: Greater than 800 ft (244 m)
- Complement: 15 officers; 120 enlisted
- Armament: 12 x VLS tubes for BGM-109 Tomahawk; 4 x 21-inch (533 mm) torpedo tubes for Mk-48 torpedoes

USS New Jersey (SSN-796), a Block IV Virginia-class submarine, is the third United States Navy vessel named for the state of New Jersey. The first two New Jerseys were battleships BB-16 and BB-62. Secretary of the Navy Ray Mabus announced the name for the third New Jersey on 25 May 2015, at a ceremony in Jersey City, New Jersey.

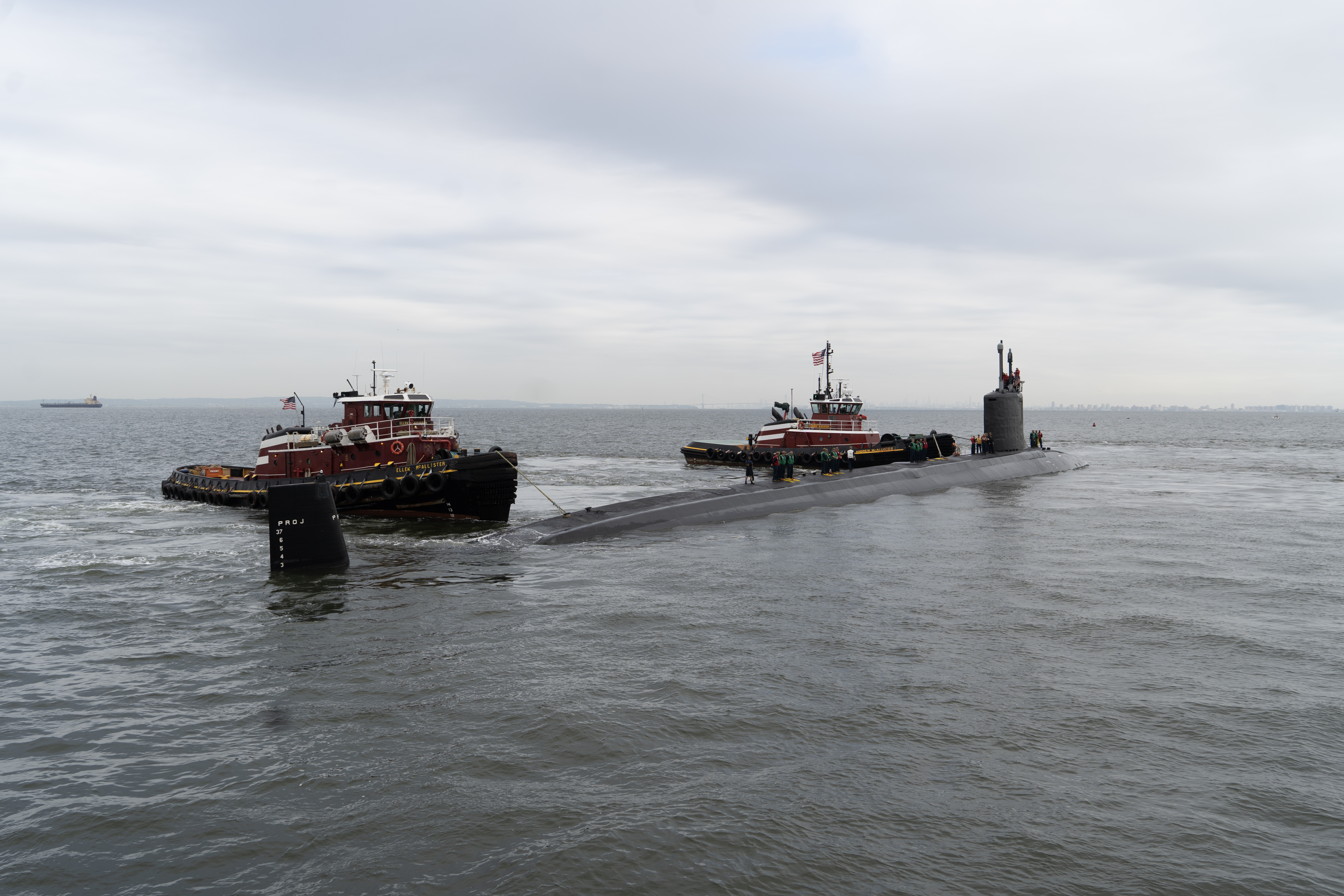
USS New Jersey arriving at Naval Weapons Station Earle

The USS New Jersey is the first US Navy attack submarine designed and constructed for a mixed-gender crew. (Note: The first female submariners ever in the US Navy were on ballistic missile submarines, such as USS Wyoming (SSBN-742), in 2011.)

== Construction ==
New Jersey's construction reached pressure hull completion in February 2021. The construction milestone signifies that all of the submarine's hull sections have been joined to form a single, watertight unit. She was christened on 13 November 2021 and launched on 14 April 2022. New Jersey was delivered to the Navy on 25 April 2024, and was commissioned on 14 September 2024 at Naval Weapons Station Earle in Middletown, New Jersey.

In October 2024, the Navy reported that welders purposely circumvented proper procedures, resulting in substandard welds on the ship. The Navy said the faulty welds did not impact the safety of the vessel.

== Ship's crest ==
New Jersey's crest features the submarine in the foreground with the Iowa-class battleship New Jersey in the background, surmounted by the motto, "Virtute Ignis Pro Libertas". This is a Latin translation of "Firepower for Freedom", which was also the battleship's motto. On the side is the outline of the State of New Jersey with a portion of the famous painting Washington Crossing the Delaware set inside the borders. The references to Washington's victory at Trenton and to the battleship New Jersey are meant to show that the submarine is the heir to a long tradition. Centered is the faded image of the battleship USS New Jersey (BB62), representing the past, and the submarine USS New Jersey (SSN 796) taking the name and her legacy into the future. The devil horns, tail, and wings on the outside of the crest are a reference to the Jersey Devil, the legendary creature said to inhabit the New Jersey Pine Barrens.

== Mixed-gender design ==
The New Jersey was designed to accommodate a mixed-gender crew. Some of the design elements include doors to establish separate sleeping and showering compartments, lowering overhead valves, and providing steps for bunk beds and stacked laundry machines.
