= List of ship launches in 1965 =

The list of ship launches in 1965 includes a chronological list of all ships launched in 1965.

Date	Ship	Class	Builder	Location	Country	Notes
8 January	Narvik	Oslo-class frigate	Karljohansvern	Horten	Norway	
16 January	Wasa	Ferry	Nobiskrug	Rendsburg	West Germany	For Lion Ferry AB
16 January	Kamehameha	Benjamin Franklin-class submarine	Mare Island Naval Shipyard	Vallejo, California	United States	
16 January	Taras Shevchenko	Ivan Franko-class passenger ship	V.E.B. Mathias-Thesen Werft	Wismar	East Germany	For Black Sea Shipping Company
Unknown date	Comilla	Rajshahi-class patrol boat	Brooke Marine Ltd.	Lowestoft	United Kingdom	For Pakistani Navy.
23 January	Denver	Austin-class amphibious transport dock	Lockheed Shipbuilding	Seattle, Washington	United States	
4 February	Voge	Garcia-class frigate	Defoe Shipbuilding Company	Bay City, Michigan	United States	
15 February	Queen of Burnaby	Burnaby-class ferry	Vancouver Shipyards Co.	North Vancouver	Canada	For BC Ferries
15 February	Zabardast	Firefighting tug	Appledore Shipbuilders Ltd.	Appledore	United Kingdom	For BP Clyde Tanker Co. Ltd.
17 February	Jessore	Patrol boat	Brooke Marine Ltd.	Lowestoft	United Kingdom	For Pakistani Navy.
18 February	Waikato	Leander-class frigate	Harland & Wolff	Belfast	United Kingdom	For Royal New Zealand Navy.
27 February	Yamagumo	Yamagumo-class destroyer			Japan	
5 March	Edenfield	Tanker	Harland & Wolff	Belfast	United Kingdom	For Eden Tankers Ltd.
11 March	Utsira	Kobben-class submarine	Nordseewerke	Emden	West Germany	For Royal Norwegian Navy
15 March	Hans Techel	Type 202 submarine	Atlas-Werke	Bremen	West Germany	For German Navy
20 March	George Bancroft	Benjamin Franklin-class submarine	Electric Boat	Groton, Connecticut	United States	
28 March	Canguro Azzurro	Ferry	Italcantieri S.p.A.	Castellamare di Stabia	Italy	For Societa. Navi. Traghetto S.N.T
5 April	Ranger Ajax	Fishing trawler	Brooke Marine Ltd.	Lowestoft	United Kingdom	For Ranger Fishing Co. Ltd.
9 April	Helgoland	Fehmarn-class tug	Schichau Unterweser AG	Bremerhaven	West Germany	
14 April	Kungsholm	Ocean liner / cruise ship	John Brown & Company	Clydebank	United Kingdom	For Swedish American Line
17 April	Glover	Garcia-class frigate	Bath Iron Works	Bath, Maine	United States	
23 April	Francis Scott Key	Benjamin Franklin-class submarine	Electric Boat	Groton, Connecticut	United States	
25 April	Wainwright	Belknap-class cruiser	Bath Iron Works	Bath, Maine	United States	
5 May	Wimbrown Two	Offshore supply vessel	Appledore Shipbuilders Ltd.	Appledore	United Kingdom	For G. Wimpey & Co. Ltd.
15 May	Guardfish	Permit-class submarine	New York Shipbuilding	Camden, New Jersey	United States	
5 April	Ranger Apollo	Fishing trawler	Brooke Marine Ltd.	Lowestoft	United Kingdom	For Ranger Fishing Co. Ltd.
17 May	North Shore	Offshore supply vessel	J. Bolson & Son Ltd.	Poole	United Kingdom	For Offshore Marine Ltd.
19 May	Utstein	Kobben-class submarine	Nordseewerke	Emden	West Germany	For Royal Norwegian Navy
21 May	George C. Marshall	Benjamin Franklin-class submarine	Newport News Shipbuilding	Newport News, Virginia	United States	
22 May	James K. Polk	Benjamin Franklin-class submarine	Electric Boat	Groton, Connecticut	United States	
29 May	Camden	Sacramento-class fast combat support ship	New York Shipbuilding	Camden, New Jersey	United States	
6 June	W. D. Tideway	Dredger	Blyth Dry Docks & Shipbuilding Co. Ltd	Blyth	United Kingdom	For Westminster Dredging Co. Ltd.
8 June	Koelsch	Garcia-class frigate	Defoe Shipbuilding Company	Bay City, Michigan	United States	
15 June	British Centaur	Tanker	Harland & Wolff	Belfast	United Kingdom	For British Tanker Company.
28 June	Rajshahi	Rajshahi-class patrol boat	Brooke Marine Ltd.	Lowestoft	United Kingdom	For Pakistani Navy.
June	La Estancia	Bulk carrier	Harland & Wolff	Belfast	United Kingdom	For Buries Marks Ltd.
2 July	Biddle	Belknap-class cruiser	Bath Iron Works	Bath, Maine	United States	
4 July	Canguro Rosso	Ferry	Navameccanica Cant. Nav.	Castellamare di Stabia	Italy	For Societa. Navi. Traghetto S.N.T
10 July	Walchensee	Walchensee-class tanker	Lindenau	Kiel	West Germany	For German Navy
26 July	Sylhet	Patrol boat	Brooke Marine Ltd.	Lowestoft	United Kingdom	For Pakistani Navy.
28 July	Craigdarragh	Tug	Appledore Shipbuilders Ltd.	Appledore	United Kingdom	For J. Cooper (Belfast) Ltd.
29 July	Petrel	Coaster	J. Bolson & Son Ltd.	Poole	United Kingdom	For General Steam Navigation Company.
5 April	Ranger Aurora	Fishing trawler	Brooke Marine Ltd.	Lowestoft	United Kingdom	For Ranger Fishing Co. Ltd.
20 July	Smit-Lloyd 51	Tender	Brooke Marine Ltd.	Lowestoft	United Kingdom	For Koninklijke Rotterdamsche Lloyd.
30 July	Utvær	Kobben-class submarine	Nordseewerke	Emden	West Germany	For Royal Norwegian Navy
31 July	Tripoli	Iwo Jima-class amphibious assault ship	Ingalls Shipbuilding	Pascagoula, Mississippi	United States	
14 August	Duluth	Austin-class amphibious transport dock	New York Naval Shipyard	Brooklyn, New York	United States	
14 August	George Washington Carver	Benjamin Franklin-class submarine	Newport News Shipbuilding	Newport News, Virginia	United States	
23 August	Bergen	Oslo-class frigate	Karljohansvern	Horten	Norway	
25 September	Warspite	Valiant-class submarine	Vickers-Armstrongs		United Kingdom	
27 September	Lady Cecelia	Tug	Appledore Shipbuilders Ltd.	Appledore	United Kingdom	For J. H. Pigott & Son.
8 October	Uthaug	Kobben-class submarine	Nordseewerke	Emden	West Germany	For Royal Norwegian Navy
18 October	Saga	ferry	Lindholmens Varv	Gothenburg	Sweden	for Swedish Lloyd
20 October	O'Callahan	Garcia-class frigate	Defoe Shipbuilding Company	Bay City, Michigan	United States	
23 October	Mariano G. Vallejo	Benjamin Franklin-class submarine	Mare Island Naval Shipyard	Vallejo, California	United States	
28 October	Fennia	Ferry	Öresundsvarvet	Landskrona	Sweden	For Siljarederiet
30 October	Forende	Ferry	Cantieri Navale Felzsegi S.p.A.	Trieste	Italy	For DFDS
31 October	Danae	Leander-class frigate	HMNB Devonport	Devonport, England	United Kingdom	
10 November	Friedrich Schürer	Type 202 submarine	Atlas-Werke	Bremen	West Germany	For German Navy
13 November	Henry L. Stimson	Benjamin Franklin-class submarine	Electric Boat	Groton, Connecticut	United States	
23 November	Grab Dredger No. 2	Dredger	Blyth Dry Docks & Shipbuilding Co. Ltd	Blyth	United Kingdom	For Calcutta Port Commission.
24 November	Juno	Leander-class frigate	John I. Thornycroft & Company	Southampton	United Kingdom	
24 November	La Sierra	Bulk carrier	Harland & Wolff	Belfast	United Kingdom	For Buries Marks Ltd.
27 November	Asashio	Asashio-class submarine			Japan	
13 December	Garganey	Wild Duck-class boom defence vessel	Brooke Marine Ltd.	Lowestoft	United Kingdom	For Royal Navy.
15 December	Finnpartner	Ferry	Wärtsilä Hietalahti shipyard	Helsinki	Finland	for Finnlines (Amer-Tupakka)
17 December	Prins Hamlet	Ferry	Wärtsilä Crichton-Vulcan	Turku	Finland	for Lion Ferry
18 December	Hamilton	Hamilton-class cutter	Avondale Shipyard	Westwego, Louisiana	United States	
18 December	Prinsesse Ragnhild	Ferry	Kiel	Howaldtswerke	West Germany	For Jahre Line
23 December	Hopper Barge No. 6	Hopper barge	Blyth Dry Docks & Shipbuilding Co. Ltd	Blyth	United Kingdom	For Calcutta Port Commission.
Unknown date	Carp	Workboat	J. Bolson & Son Ltd.	Poole	United Kingdom	For Royal Corps of Transport.
Unknown date	Chubb	Workboat	J. Bolson & Son Ltd.	Poole	United Kingdom	For Royal Corps of Transport.
Unknown date	Ellen May	Motor barge	Harland & Wolff	Belfast	United Kingdom	For Scott (Toombridge) Ltd.
Unknown date	Englishman	Tug	Cochrane & Son Ltd.	Selby	United Kingdom	For United Towing Co. Ltd.
Unknown date	Rohoy	Coaster		Frindsbury.	United Kingdom	For London & Rochester Trading Co Ltd.
Unknown date	St. Elmo	Tug	W. J. Yarwood & Sons Ltd.	Northwich	United Kingdom	For Midmed Towage Co. Ltd.
