= USS James K. Polk =

Submarine of the United States

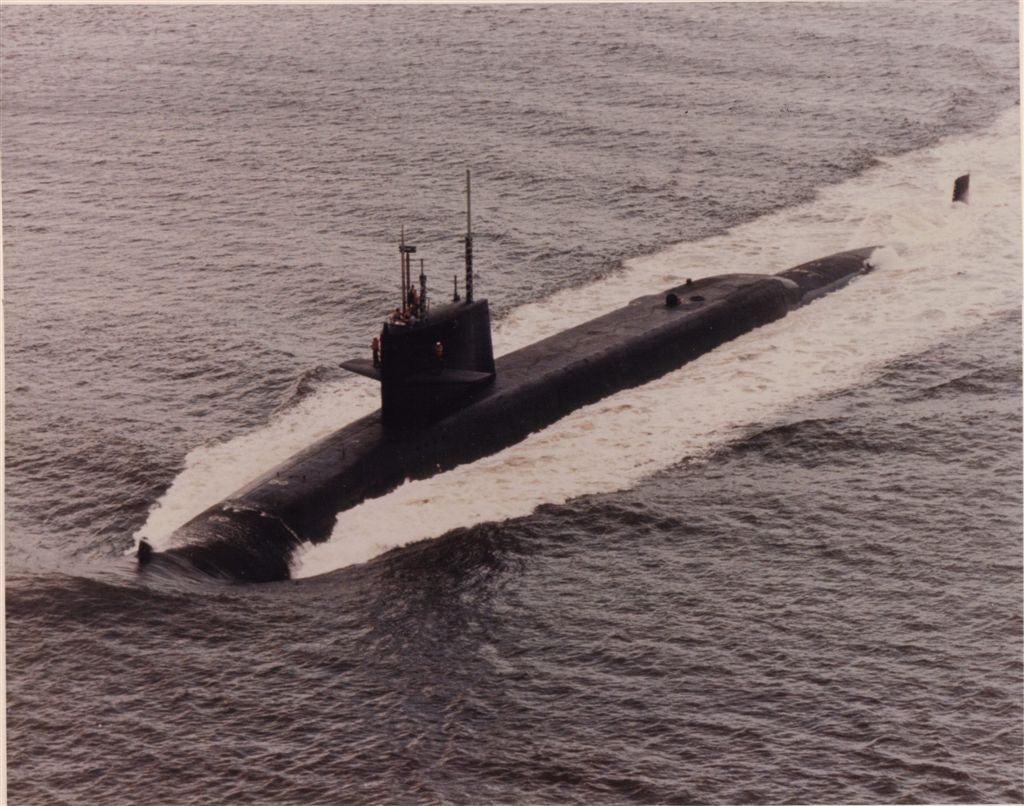
- USS James K. Polk (SSBN-645), probably while on sea trials in the spring of 1966.

History

United States
- Name: James K. Polk
- Namesake: James K. Polk (1795–1849), 11th President of the United States (1845–1849)
- Awarded: 1 November 1962
- Builder: General Dynamics Electric Boat, Groton, Connecticut
- Laid down: 23 November 1963
- Launched: 22 May 1965
- Sponsored by: Mrs. Horacio Rivero, Jr.
- Commissioned: 16 April 1966
- Decommissioned: 8 July 1999
- Reclassified: From fleet ballistic missile submarine (SSBN-645) to attack submarine (SSN-645) March 1994
- Stricken: 8 July 1999
- Fate: Scrapped via Ship and Submarine Recycling Program 26 April 2000
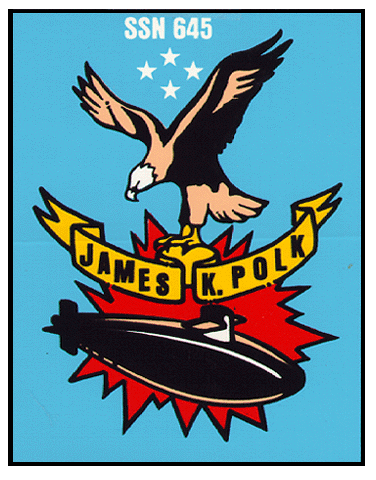
- Badge

General characteristics
- Class & type: Benjamin Franklin class fleet ballistic missile submarine 1966–1994; attack submarine 1994–1999
- Displacement: 6527 tons light; 7345 tons full; 818 tons dead
- Length: 425 feet (130 m)
- Beam: 33 feet (10 m)
- Draft: 31 feet (9.4 m)
- Installed power: 15,000 shp (11,185 kW)
- Propulsion: One S5W pressurized-water nuclear reactor, two geared steam turbines, one shaft
- Speed: Over 20 knots
- Test depth: 1,300 feet (400 m)
- Complement: Two crews (Blue Crew and Gold Crew) of 14 officers and 129 enlisted men each
- Armament: 16 × ballistic missile tubes (removed 1994) with one Polaris, later Poseidon missile each; 4 × 21 inches (530 mm)torpedo tubes

USS James K. Polk (SSBN-645), a Benjamin Franklin class fleet ballistic missile submarine, was the second ship of the United States Navy to be named for James K. Polk (1795–1849), the eleventh President of the United States (1845–1849). She was later converted into an attack submarine and redesignated SSN-645.

== Construction and commissioning ==
The contract for James K. Polk's construction was awarded on 1 November 1962, and her keel was laid down on 23 November 1963 by the Electric Boat Division of the General Dynamics Corporation at Groton, Connecticut. She was launched on 22 May 1965, sponsored by Hazel (Hooper) Rivero, wife of Admiral Horacio Rivero, Jr., the Vice Chief of Naval Operations, and commissioned on 16 April 1966 with Commander R.M. Douglass commanding the Gold Crew and Commander F.D. McMullen, Jr., commanding the Blue Crew.

== Service history ==
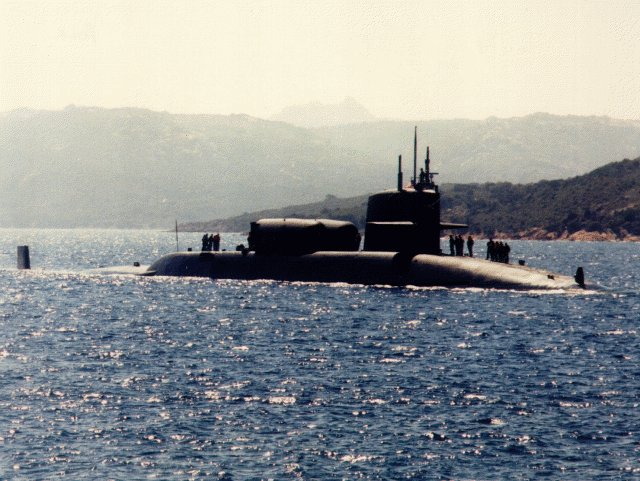
James K. Polk sometime in the mid- or late 1990s after conversion to an attack submarine and redesignation as SSN-645. The Dry Deck Shelters were installed on her deck during her 1992–1994 conversion are visible.

James K. Polk sailed to Charleston, South Carolina in September 1966 to load Polaris ballistic missiles for her initial deterrent patrol. After completion of her shakedown, she operated on strategic deterrent patrols in the Atlantic Ocean and completed 19 of them between September 1966 and May 1971.

In July 1971, James K. Polk began her first overhaul at Newport News Shipbuilding in Newport News, Virginia, for nuclear refueling and conversion of her ballistic missile system to support the Poseidon C-3 ballistic missile. She completed her conversion in late 1972 and commenced a rigorous schedule of sea trials and exercises, culminating in the Demonstration and Shakedown Operation (DASO) of her Poseidon missile system, which tested her ballistic missile system and crew by requiring the launch of a Poseidon C-3 missile from the submarine.

James K. Polk resumed deterrent patrols in the Atlantic Ocean in May 1973 with her new Poseidon missiles. She conducted her second overhaul at Portsmouth Naval Shipyard at Kittery, Maine, after completing her 50th deterrent patrol in September 1981. She completed overhaul in 1983 and conducted seven more successful deterrent patrols.

James K. Polk returned to Portsmouth Naval Shipyard in January 1986 for a third overhaul after completing her 58th deterrent patrol. She departed Portsmouth Naval Shipyard in November 1988, then headed south for her post-overhaul DASO. In May 1989 she began her final series of Poseidon strategic deterrent patrols.

James K. Polk celebrated her 25th year of commissioned service in April 1991. She finished her 66th and final strategic deterrent patrol in August 1991.

=== Conversion to attack submarine ===
In August 1992, James K. Polk began a nineteen-month shipyard conversion that removed her ballistic missiles and deactivated her missile tubes, converted her into an attack submarine, and installed Dry Deck Shelters on her deck which would allow her to support special warfare operations. Upon completion of this conversion in March 1994, her hull classification symbol was changed from SSBN-645 to SSN-645 to reflect her conversion from a fleet ballistic missile submarine to an attack submarine.

After conversion, James K. Polk completed three extended deployments to the Mediterranean Sea, participating in numerous special forces and North Atlantic Treaty Organization exercises.

== Deactivation, decommissioning, and disposal ==
The sail on display at the National Museum of Nuclear Science & History

On 9 January 1999, James K. Polk was deactivated at Norfolk, Virginia. On 8 July 1999, she was decommissioned at the Puget Sound Naval Shipyard at Bremerton, Washington, and stricken from the Naval Vessel Register the same day. Her scrapping via the Ship-Submarine Recycling Program was accomplished on 26 April 2000.

== Commemoration ==
James K. Polk's sail is on display at the National Museum of Nuclear Science & History in Albuquerque, New Mexico.
