= USS Bancroft =

Three ships of the United States Navy have been named Bancroft in honor of George Bancroft.

- USS Bancroft (1892), was a gunboat, launched in 1892, commissioned in 1893 and decommissioned in 1906.
- USS Bancroft (DD-256), was a Clemson-class destroyer, commissioned in 1919 and transferred to the Royal Canadian Navy in 1940 as HMCS St. Francis.
- USS Bancroft (DD-598), was a Benson-class destroyer commissioned in 1942 and decommissioned in 1946.

== See also ==
- USS George Bancroft (SSBN-643)
