= USS Mariano G. Vallejo =

Benjamin Franklin-class submarine

USS Mariano G. Vallejo (SSBN-658)
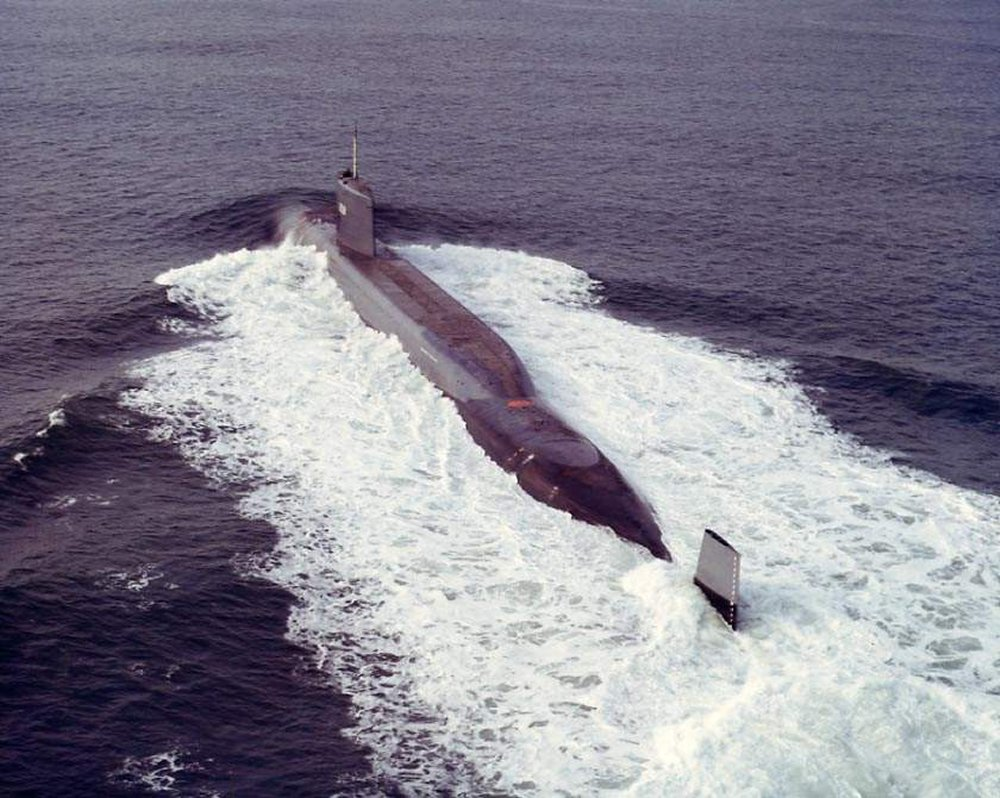
- USS Mariano G. Vallejo (SSBN-658) off Mare Island sometime in December 1966.

History

United States
- Namesake: Mariano Guadalupe Vallejo (1807-1890), a proponent of California statehood
- Ordered: 8 August 1963
- Builder: Mare Island Naval Shipyard, Vallejo, California
- Laid down: 7 July 1964
- Launched: 23 October 1965
- Sponsored by: Miss Patricia O. V. McGettigan
- Commissioned: 16 December 1966
- Decommissioned: 9 March 1995
- Stricken: 9 March 1995
- Fate: Scrapping via Ship and Submarine Recycling Program begun 1 October 1994, completed 22 December 1995

General characteristics
- Class & type: Benjamin Franklin-class fleet ballistic missile submarine
- Displacement: 6,465 long tons (6,569 t) light; 7,300 long tons (7,417 t) surfaced; 8,250 long tons (8,382 t) submerged
- Length: 425 ft (130 m)
- Beam: 33 ft (10 m)
- Draft: 31 ft (9.4 m)
- Installed power: 15,000 shp (11,185 kW)
- Propulsion: One S5W pressurized-water nuclear reactor, two geared steam turbines, one shaft
- Speed: Over 20 knots (37 km/h; 23 mph)
- Test depth: 1,300 feet (400 m)
- Complement: Two crews (Blue Crew and Gold Crew) of 120 men each
- Armament: 16 × ballistic missile tubes; 4 × 21 in (533 mm) forward torpedo tubes

USS Mariano G. Vallejo (SSBN-658), was a Benjamin Franklin-class fleet ballistic missile submarine, named for Mariano Guadalupe Vallejo (1807–1890), a key proponent of California statehood. The boat's service extended from 1966 until 1995.

== Construction and commissioning ==
The contract to build Mariano G. Vallejo was awarded to Mare Island Naval Shipyard at Vallejo, California, on 8 August 1963 and her keel was laid down there on 7 July 1964. She was launched on 23 October 1965, sponsored by Miss Patricia Oliver Vallejo McGettigan, great-great- granddaughter of Mariano Vallejo, and commissioned on 16 December 1966, with Commander Douglas B. Guthe commanding the Blue Crew and Commander John K. Nunneley commanding the Gold Crew.

== Service history ==
Mariano G. Vallejo conducted shakedown and training exercises along the United States West Coast, in the Caribbean Sea, and off the coast of Florida. Transiting the Panama Canal for the second time on 21 March 1967, she headed for her assigned home port, Pearl Harbor, Hawaii. Arriving there on 10 April 1967, she continued training exercises and sound trials, then returned briefly to Mare Island Naval Shipyard. From there she sailed back to Pearl Harbor, becoming, as of 1 August 1967, a fully operational unit of Submarine Squadron 15, ready to conduct strategic deterrent patrols. There are veteran's accounts and photographs suggesting that her early early deterrent patrols were support from Guam. In this period, she carried Polaris A-3 missiles and followed the standard pattern that the "Forty-one for Freedom" boats. This involved a roughly 70 day submerged deterrent patrols with blue and gold crews alternating to keep the submarine on station as continuously as possible.

In the early 1970s, the US Navy chose the submarine as part of its plan to upgrade all subs carrying Polaris A-3 to carry Poseidon C-3 missiles, and as part of this, she was shifted from Pacific to Atlantic waters to enter the yard.

The major overhaul and the weapons system conversion began on August 21, 1972, at Newport News Shipbuilding and Dry Dock Company in Virginia. Besides the updates to handle the Poseidon C-3 missiles, she received updates to navigation and sonar systems as well as upgrades typical of a mid-life refit. She returned to the fleet as a Poseidon-capable SSBN on December 19, 1973.

Mariano G. Vallejo was the last to patrol, last to off-load her missiles and the last to arrive in Washington making her the last of the "Forty-one for Freedom". On 2 August 1994, the submarine left Charleston for the last time. She arrived at the Panama Canal on 10 August and during the voyage to San Diego transited 20 nautical miles (37 km) from the epicenter of a 7.2 earthquake. In port at the Mare Island shipyard the crew hosted over three thousand tours of the boat in eleven days.

== Decommissioning and disposal ==
Mariano G. Vallejo was both decommissioned and stricken from the Naval Vessel Register on 9 March 1995. Her scrapping via the U.S. Navy's Nuclear-Powered Ship and Submarine Recycling Program at Bremerton, Washington, began on 1 October 1994 and was completed on 22 December 1995.

== Commemoration ==
Mariano G. Vallejo's sail was preserved, and has been on the waterfront at Mare Island since 1995. Much of this time, the sail sat at the docks, exposed to the elements and mostly neglected. As of 2019, it was moved to a permanent memorial located within the Mare Island Museum as part of the Save-Our-Sail Project. In addition to the preservation of the sail, the control room of Mariano G. Vallejo was reconstructed including a fully operational periscope from Mariano G. Vallejo.

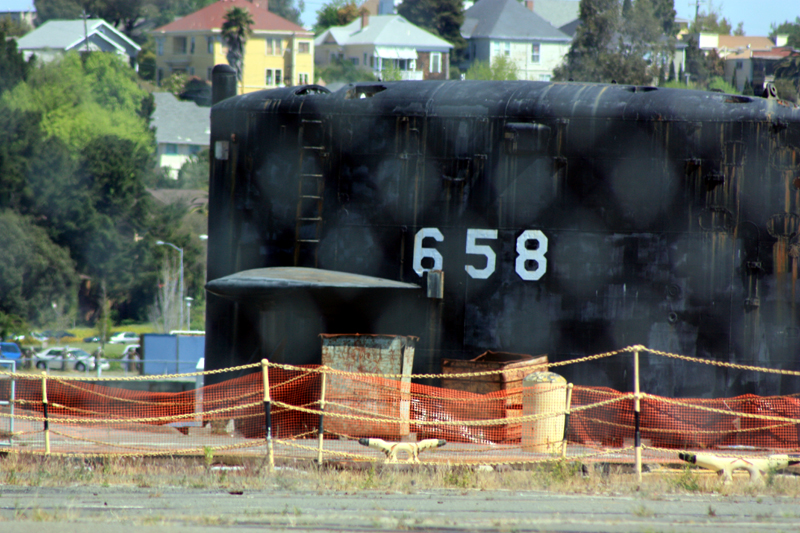
Mariano G. Vallejo's sail at Mare Island, circa 2008.
