= Benjamin Franklin-class submarine =

Submarine class of the United States Navy

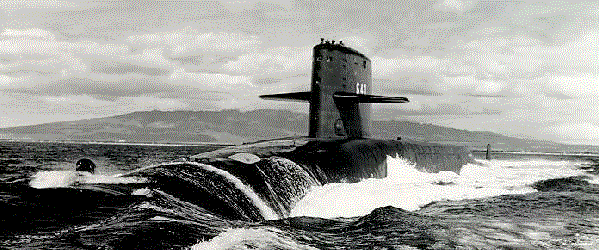
- USS Benjamin Franklin

Class overview
- Name: Benjamin Franklin class
- Builders: Electric Boat, CT (6); Newport News Shipbuilding, VA (4); Mare Island Naval Shipyard, CA (2)
- Operators: United States Navy
- Preceded by: James Madison class
- Succeeded by: Ohio class
- Built: 1963–1967
- In commission: 1965–2002
- Completed: 12
- Retired: 12

General characteristics
- Type: Nuclear-powered ballistic missile submarine
- Displacement: Surfaced: 7,325 long tons (7,443 t) Submerged: 8,251 long tons (8,383 t)
- Length: 425 ft (130 m)
- Beam: 33 ft (10 m)
- Draft: 28 ft 6 in (8.69 m)
- Propulsion: 1 × S5W PWR; 2 geared steam turbines (15,000 shp (11,000 kW)), 1 shaft
- Speed: 16 kn (30 km/h; 18 mph) surfaced; 21 kn (39 km/h; 24 mph) submerged
- Test depth: 1,300 feet (400 m)
- Complement: Two crews of 14 officers and 126 enlisted
- Armament: 16 Polaris A3 or Poseidon C3 or Trident I C4 missiles; 4 × 21-inch (533 mm) torpedo tubes, 13 torpedoes

The Benjamin Franklin class of US ballistic missile submarines were in service from the 1960s to the 2000s. The class was an evolutionary development from the earlier James Madison class of fleet ballistic missile submarine. Having quieter machinery and other improvements, it is considered a separate class. A subset of this class is the re-engineered 640 class starting with USS George C. Marshall. The primary difference was that they were built under the new SUBSAFE rules after the loss of USS Thresher, whereas earlier boats of the class had to be retrofitted to meet SUBSAFE requirements. The Benjamin Franklin class, together with the George Washington, Ethan Allen, Lafayette, and James Madison classes, comprised the "41 for Freedom" submarines that were the Navy's primary contribution to the nuclear deterrent force through the late 1980s. This class and the James Madison class are combined with the Lafayettes in some references.

== Design ==
The Benjamin Franklin-class submarines were built with the Polaris A-3 ballistic missile, and in the early 1970s were converted to carry the Poseidon C-3 missile. During the late 1970s and early 1980s, six boats were further modified to carry the Trident I (C-4) missile, along with six James Madison-class boats. These were Benjamin Franklin, Simon Bolivar, George Bancroft, Henry L. Stimson, Francis Scott Key, and Mariano G. Vallejo.

In response to the loss of USS Thresher in April 1963, this class was designed to SUBSAFE standards and its equipment was similar to the Sturgeon-class fast attack submarines (SSNs). Previous US SSBNs except the George Washington class had equipment similar to the Thresher-class SSNs.

This class can be distinguished by the fairwater planes' location halfway up the sail; the Lafayettes and James Madisons had the fairwater planes in the upper front portion of the sail.

Two submarines of this class were converted for delivery of up to 66 SEALs or other Special Operations Forces each. In the early 1990s, to make room for the Ohio-class ballistic missile submarines within the limits set by the SALT II strategic arms limitation treaty, the ballistic missile tubes of Kamehameha and James K. Polk were disabled. Those boats were redesignated special operations attack submarines and given attack submarine (SSN) hull classification symbols. They were equipped with dry deck shelters to accommodate SEAL Delivery Vehicles or other equipment.

== Fate ==
The Benjamin Franklins were decommissioned between 1992 and 2002 to comply with SALT II treaty limitations as the Ohio class SSBNs entered service, for their age, and because of the collapse of the Soviet Union. USS Kamehameha was decommissioned on 2 April 2002, the last ship of the Benjamin Franklin class to be decommissioned.

The sail of George Bancroft is preserved at the Naval Submarine Base King's Bay, Georgia. James K. Polk's sail is on display at the National Museum of Nuclear Science & History in Albuquerque, New Mexico. Mariano G. Vallejo's sail is preserved at Mare Island, California, where she was built. The sail of Lewis and Clark is on display at the Patriot's Point Maritime Museum in Charleston, South Carolina.

== Boats in class ==
List of Benjamin Franklin-class submarines
Name	Hull no.	Builder	Laid down	Launched	Commissioned	Decommissioned	Fate (Note: All Benjamin Franklin-class submarines were disposed of through the Ship-Submarine Recycling Program. The year in the Fate column indicates the disposal year of the submarine.)
Benjamin Franklin (Note: Submarine was converted to carry the Trident I (C-4) ballistic missile.)	SSBN-640	General Dynamics Electric Boat	25 May 1963	5 December 1964	22 October 1965	23 November 1993	disp. 1995
Simon Bolivar	SSBN-641	Newport News Shipbuilding and Drydock Co.	17 April 1963	22 August 1964	29 October 1965	8 February 1995	disp. 1995
Kamehameha	SSBN-642	Mare Island Naval Shipyard	2 May 1963	16 January 1965	10 December 1965	2 April 2002	disp. 2003
George Bancroft	SSBN-643	General Dynamics Electric Boat	24 August 1963	20 March 1965	22 January 1966	21 September 1993	disp. 1998
Lewis and Clark	SSBN-644	Newport News Shipbuilding and Drydock Co.	29 July 1963	21 November 1964	22 December 1965	27 June 1992	disp. 1996
James K. Polk	SSBN-645	General Dynamics Electric Boat	23 November 1963	22 May 1965	16 April 1966	8 July 1999	disp. 2000
George C. Marshall	SSBN-654	Newport News Shipbuilding and Drydock Co.	2 March 1964	21 May 1965	29 April 1966	24 September 1992	disp. 1994
Henry L. Stimson	SSBN-655	General Dynamics Electric Boat	4 April 1964	13 November 1965	20 August 1966	5 May 1993	disp. 1994
George Washington Carver	SSBN-656	Newport News Shipbuilding and Drydock Co.	24 August 1964	14 August 1965	15 June 1966	18 March 1993	disp. 1994
Francis Scott Key	SSBN-657	General Dynamics Electric Boat	5 December 1964	23 April 1966	3 December 1966	2 September 1993	disp. 1995
Mariano G. Vallejo	SSBN-658	Mare Island Naval Shipyard	7 July 1964	23 October 1965	16 December 1966	9 March 1995	disp. 1995
Will Rogers	SSBN-659	General Dynamics Electric Boat	20 March 1965	21 July 1966	1 April 1967	12 April 1993	disp. 1994

== See also ==
- List of submarines of the United States Navy
- List of submarine classes of the United States Navy
