= USS Benjamin Franklin =

American nuclear submarine

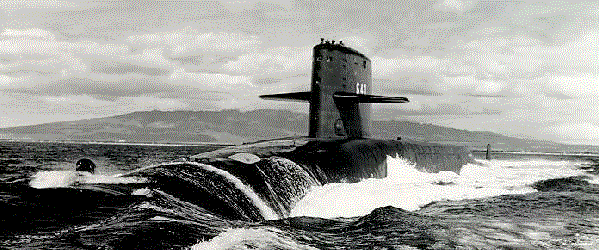
- USS Benjamin Franklin (SSBN-640) puts out to sea

History

United States
- Name: USS Benjamin Franklin
- Namesake: Benjamin Franklin (1706–1790), an American journalist, publisher, author, philanthropist, abolitionist, public servant, scientist, librarian, diplomat, inventor, and Founding Father
- Ordered: 1 November 1962
- Builder: General Dynamics Electric Boat
- Laid down: 25 May 1963
- Launched: 5 December 1964
- Sponsored by: Mrs. Francis L. Moseley and Mrs. Leon V. Chaplin
- Commissioned: 22 October 1965
- Decommissioned: 23 November 1993
- Stricken: 23 November 1993
- Fate: Scrapping via Ship and Submarine Recycling Program completed 21 August 1995

General characteristics
- Class & type: Benjamin Franklin-class fleet ballistic missile submarine
- Displacement: 7,300 long tons (7,417 t) surfaced; 8,250 long tons (8,382 t) submerged
- Length: 425 ft (130 m)
- Beam: 33 ft (10 m)
- Draft: 31 ft (9.4 m)
- Installed power: 15,000 shp (11,185 kW)
- Propulsion: One S5W pressurized-water nuclear reactor, two geared steam turbines, one shaft
- Speed: Over 20 knots
- Test depth: 1,300 feet (400 m)
- Complement: Two crews (Blue Crew and Gold Crew) of 120 men each
- Armament: 16 × ballistic missile tubes; 4 × 21 in (533 mm) torpedo tubes (all forward)

USS Benjamin Franklin (SSBN-640), the lead ship of her class of ballistic missile submarine, was the only submarine of the United States Navy to be named for Benjamin Franklin (1706–1790), one of the Founding Fathers of the United States.^{a}

== Construction and commissioning ==
The contract to build Benjamin Franklin was awarded to the Electric Boat Division of General Dynamics Corporation in Groton, Connecticut, on 1 November 1962 and her keel was laid down there on 25 May 1963. She was launched on 5 December 1964, sponsored by Mrs. Francis L. Moseley and Mrs. Leon V. Chaplin, great, great, great, great, great-granddaughters of Benjamin Franklin, and commissioned on 22 October 1965, with Captain Donald M. Miller commanding the Blue Crew and Commander Ross N. Williams commanding the Gold Crew.

== Service history ==
On 6 December 1965, the Gold Crew successfully launched a Polaris A-3 ballistic missile in close coordination with an orbital pass of the Gemini 7 astronauts Frank Borman and Jim Lovell.

History needed for 1965–1993.

== Decommissioning and disposal ==
Benjamin Franklin was decommissioned on 23 November 1993 and stricken from the Naval Vessel Register the same day. Her scrapping via the Nuclear-Powered Ship and Submarine Recycling Program in Bremerton, Washington, was completed on 21 August 1995.

== Notes ==
^a Five other ships in the United States Navy have been named for Franklin.
