= USS Will Rogers =

Submarine of the United States

USS Will Rogers (SSBN-659)
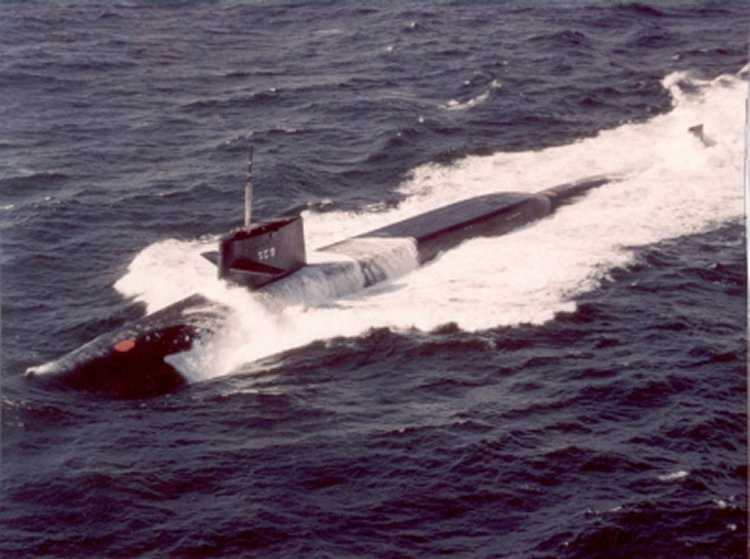
- USS Will Rogers (SSBN-659) on 15 February 1967.

History

United States
- Namesake: Will Rogers (1879–1935), an American humorist
- Awarded: 29 July 1963
- Builder: General Dynamics Electric Boat, Groton, Connecticut
- Laid down: 20 March 1965
- Launched: 21 July 1966
- Sponsored by: Muriel Buck Humphrey
- Commissioned: 1 April 1967
- Decommissioned: 12 April 1993
- Stricken: 12 April 1993
- Identification: Hull symbol: SSBN-659; Code letters: NAUE
- Fate: Scrapping via Ship and Submarine Recycling Program begun 2 November 1993, completed 12 August 1994

General characteristics
- Class & type: Benjamin Franklin-class nuclear-powered fleet ballistic missile submarine
- Displacement: 7,320 tons surfaced; 8,220 tons submerged
- Length: 425 ft (130 m)
- Beam: 33 ft (10 m)
- Draft: 31 ft 4 in (9.55 m)
- Installed power: 15,000 shp (11,185 kW)
- Propulsion: One S5W pressurized-water nuclear reactor, later replaced by one S3G reactor; two geared steam turbines; one shaft
- Speed: 16 knots (30 km/h; 18 mph) surfaced; Over 20 knots (37 km/h; 23 mph) submerged
- Test depth: greater than 400 ft (120 m) (classified)
- Complement: Two crews (Blue Crew and Gold crew) of 140 each
- Armament: 16 × ballistic missile tubes, each with one Polaris, later Poseidon; 4 × 21 in (530 mm) torpedo tubes

USS Will Rogers (SSBN-659) was a Benjamin Franklin-class ballistic missile submarine – the last of the "41 for Freedom" Polaris submarines. She was the only ship of the United States Navy to be named for humorist Will Rogers (1879–1935).

== Construction and commissioning ==
The contract to construct Will Rogers was awarded on 29 July 1963, and her keel was laid down on 20 March 1965 at Groton, Connecticut, by the General Dynamics Corporation's Electric Boat Division. She was launched on 21 July 1966 sponsored by Muriel Buck Humphrey, the wife of Vice President of the United States Hubert Humphrey, and commissioned on 1 April 1967 with Captain R. Y. Kaufman in command of the Blue Crew and Commander W. J. Cowhill in command of the Gold crew.

== Service history ==
Following shakedown, Will Rogers culminated her initial training and work-up by conducting a successful Polaris ballistic missile launch on the Atlantic Missile Range off Cape Kennedy, Florida, on 31 July 1967. In October 1967, she began her first strategic deterrent patrol.

Will Rogers was based at Groton until 1974 when she shifted to a forward deployment at Naval Station Rota, Spain. Around this time, she was converted to carry Poseidon ballistic missiles, and her nuclear reactor was modified to use an S3G core 3. She conducted additional deterrent deployments from Rota into 1978, bringing the total number of patrols she had conducted to 35.

From the latter half of 1978 until November 1991 Will Rogers was forward deployed at Site One in Holy Loch, Scotland. On 9 November 1991, Will Rogers departed Site One, the last submarine to leave Holy Loch before Submarine Squadron 14, which had been based there, was deactivated.

== Deactivation, decommissioning, and disposal ==
Deactivated while still in commission, Will Rogers entered the U.S Navy's Nuclear-Powered Ship and Submarine Recycling Program at Bremerton, Washington on 2 November 1992. She was formally both decommissioned and stricken from the Naval Vessel Register on 12 April 1993. Scrapping via the recycling program was completed on 12 August 1994.
