= USS George Bancroft =

Submarine of the United States

Coordinates: 30°46′55″N 81°34′33″W

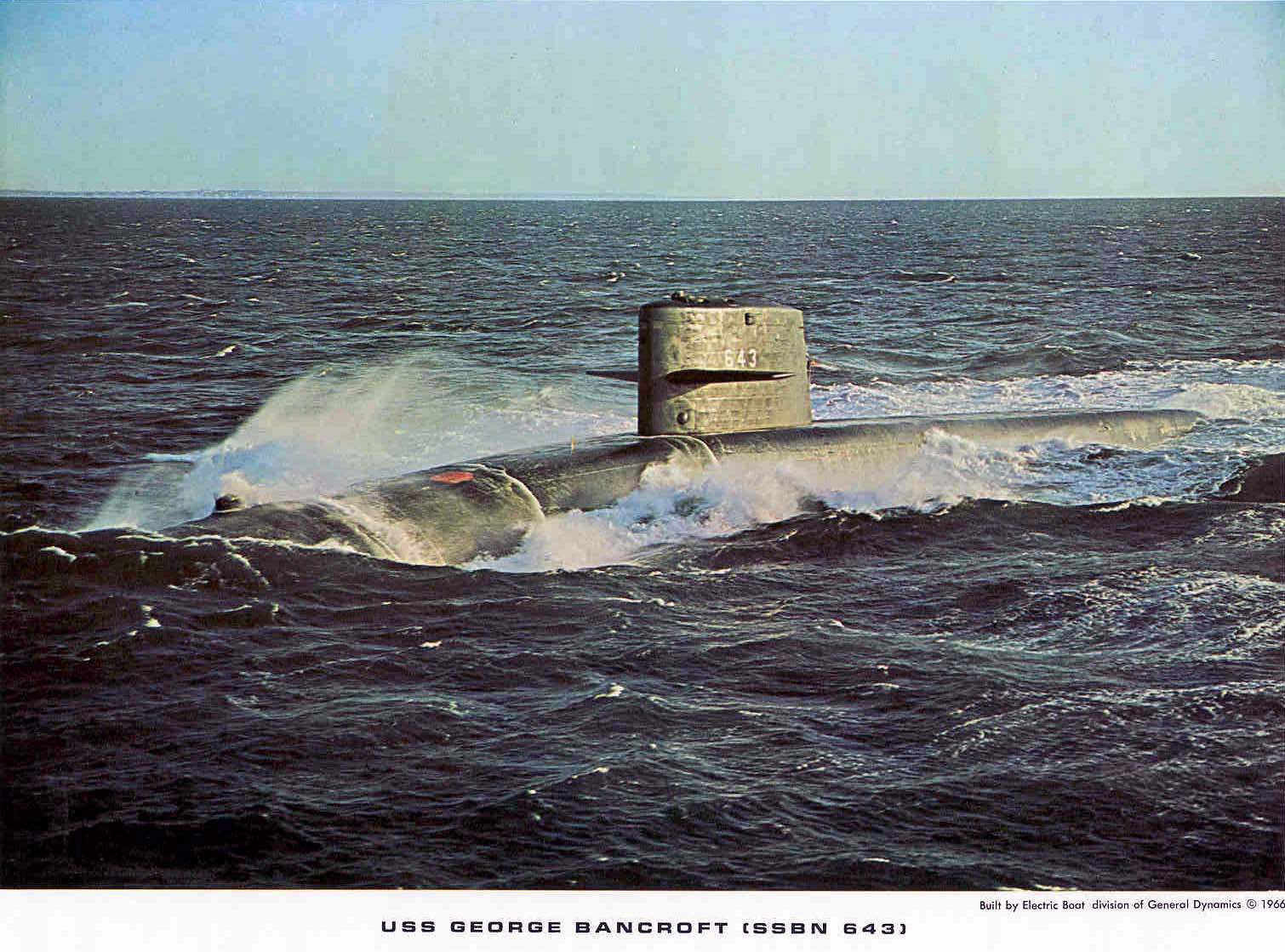
- USS George Bancroft (SSBN-643), probably during her sea trials off the coast of New England in late 1965.

History

United States
- Name: USS George Bancroft
- Namesake: George Bancroft (1800–1891), U.S. Secretary of the Navy (1845-1846)
- Ordered: 1 November 1962
- Builder: General Dynamics Electric Boat
- Laid down: 24 August 1963
- Launched: 20 March 1965
- Sponsored by: Mrs. Anita Irvine
- Commissioned: 22 January 1966
- Decommissioned: 21 September 1993
- Stricken: 21 September 1993
- Fate: Scrapping via Ship and Submarine Recycling Program completed 30 March 1998

General characteristics
- Class & type: Benjamin Franklin-class submarine
- Displacement: 7,300 long tons (7,417 t) surfaced; 8,250 long tons (8,382 t) submerged
- Length: 425 ft (130 m)
- Beam: 33 ft (10 m)
- Draft: 31 ft (9.4 m)
- Installed power: 15,000 shp (11,185 kW)
- Propulsion: One S5W pressurized-water nuclear reactor, two geared steam turbines, one shaft
- Speed: Over 20 knots
- Test depth: 1,300 feet (400 m)
- Complement: Two crews (Blue Crew and Gold Crew) of 120 men each
- Armament: 16 × ballistic missile tubes; 4 × 21 in (533 mm) torpedo tubes (all forward)

USS George Bancroft (SSBN-643), a Benjamin Franklin class (or "640-class") fleet ballistic missile submarine, was the fourth ship^{a} of the United States Navy to be named in honor of George Bancroft (1800-1891), United States Secretary of the Navy (1845–1846) and the founder of the United States Naval Academy.

== Construction and commissioning ==
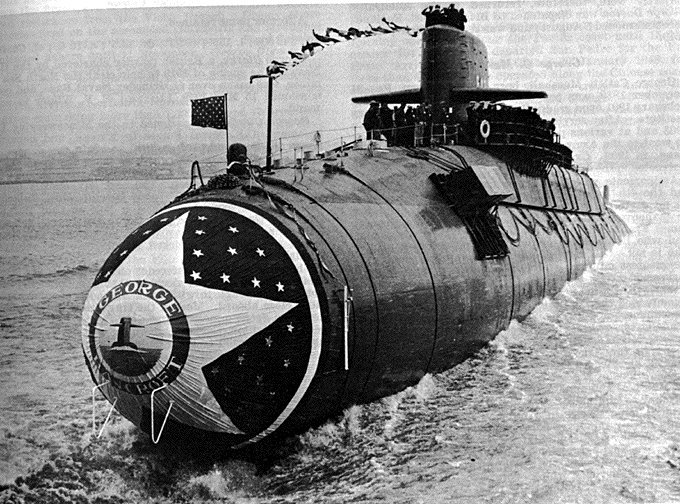
George Bancroft is launched at Groton, Connecticut, on 20 March 1965.

The contract to build George Bancroft was awarded to the Electric Boat Division of General Dynamics Corporation in Groton, Connecticut, on 1 November 1962 and her keel was laid down there on 24 August 1963. She was launched on 20 March 1965, sponsored by Mrs. Jean B. Langdon, great, great-granddaughter of Secretary Bancroft, and Mrs. Anita C. Irvine, his great, great, great-granddaughter, and commissioned on 22 January 1966, with Captain Joe Williams, Jr. in command of the Blue Crew and Commander Walter M. Douglass in command of the Gold Crew.

== Service history ==
George Bancroft was assigned to Submarine Squadron 14 of Submarine Flotilla 6 with New London, Connecticut, as her home port. Her first deployment began with her departure from New London on her first deterrent patrol on 26 July 1966, manned by the Blue Crew. Soon after she successfully completed the patrol with her arrival at Holy Loch, Scotland, the Gold Crew relieved the Blue Crew. A few weeks later, George Bancroft got underway for her second deterrent patrol, manned by the Gold Crew, which ended toward the close of the year. Early in 1967, George Bancroft began her third deterrent patrol, manned by the Blue Crew.

History needed for 1967-1993.

== Decommissioning and disposal ==
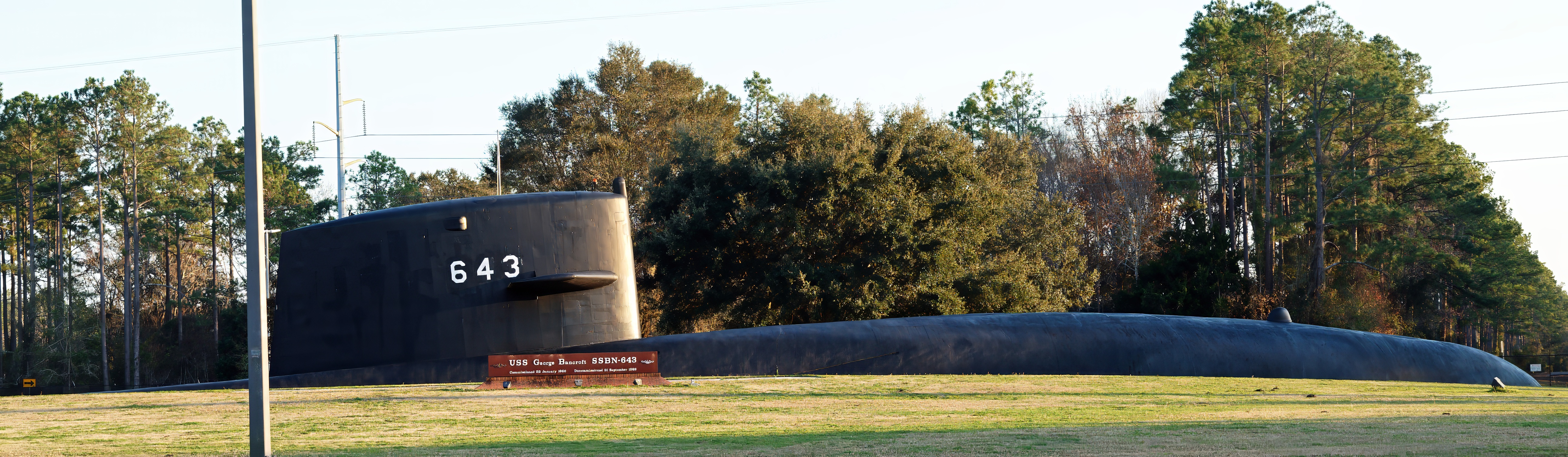
Sail of USS George Bancroft (SSBN-643) on display at Naval Submarine Base Kings Bay, Georgia.

George Bancroft was decommissioned on 21 September 1993 and stricken from the Naval Vessel Register the same day. Her scrapping via the Nuclear-Powered Ship and Submarine Recycling Program at Bremerton, Washington, was completed on 30 March 1998.

== Commemoration ==
George Bancroft's sail is on display at Naval Submarine Base Kings Bay, Georgia.

== Notes ==
^a The previous three all were named USS Bancroft.
