= 41 for Freedom =

US Navy Fleet Ballistic Missile submarines

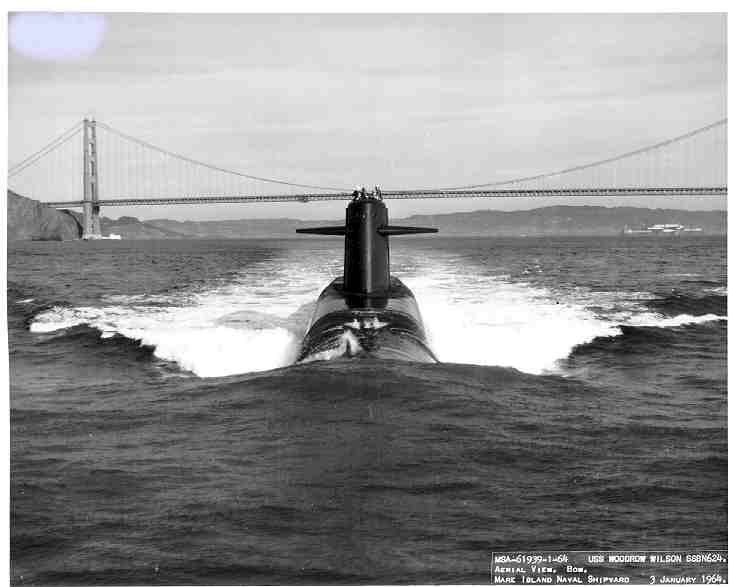
- USS Woodrow Wilson, a Lafayette-class submarine that formed part of the "41 for Freedom" force

Class overview
- Name: Five classes: George Washington; Ethan Allen; Lafayette; James Madison; Benjamin Franklin
- Operators: United States Navy
- Preceded by: Regulus missile submarines
- Succeeded by: Ohio class
- Built: 1 November 1958 to 20 March 1965
- Completed: 41
- Active: 0
- Lost: 0
- Retired: 39
- Preserved: 2

General characteristics
- Length: 381–425 ft (116–130 m) (depending on class)
- Beam: 33 feet (10 m)
- Draft: 31 feet (9.4 m)
- Speed: 20 knots (37 km/h; 23 mph)
- Test depth: In excess of 400 ft (120 m)
- Complement: 14 officers, 140 enlisted
- Armament: 4 × 21-inch (533 mm) bow torpedo tubes; 16 × SLBMs depending upon class and vessel: UGM-27 Polaris A1, A2, or A3; UGM-73 Poseidon C3; UGM-96A Trident I C4

41 for Freedom refers to the US Navy Fleet Ballistic Missile (FBM) submarines from the George Washington, Ethan Allen, Lafayette, James Madison, and Benjamin Franklin classes. All of these submarines were commissioned 1959–1967, as the goal was to create a credible, survivable sea-based deterrent as quickly as possible. These submarines were nicknamed "41 for Freedom" once the goal of 41 nuclear-powered ballistic missile submarines (SSBNs) was established in the early 1960s. The 1972 SALT I Treaty limited the number of American submarine-launched ballistic missile tubes to 656, based on the total missile tubes of the forty-one submarines, in line with the treaty's goal of limiting strategic nuclear weapons to the number already existing.

== Overview ==
The United States had deployed nuclear weapons aboard submarines for the purpose of deterrence since 1959, using the SSM-N-8 Regulus cruise missile. However, this was intended to act merely as a stopgap, as the Regulus was limited both by its size—the greatest number of missiles capable of being taken to sea was five aboard USS Halibut—and by its range and speed, as well as by the submarine's requirement to surface to launch a missile. The intention was that the main element of the US Navy's contribution to the strategic nuclear deterrent be a ballistic missile–armed submarine. The "41 for Freedom" ballistic missile submarines were armed with submarine-launched ballistic missiles (SLBMs) to create a deterrent force against the threat of nuclear war with any foreign power threatening the United States during the Cold War.

The US Navy created a new submarine classification for these boats: SSBN. The first of the "41 for Freedom" submarines to be completed was USS George Washington, which was commissioned on 30 December 1959. The final boat to enter service was USS Will Rogers, which was commissioned on 1 April 1967. The 41 submarines were ultimately superseded in service by the Ohio class, the first of which was commissioned in 1981.

USS Kamehameha, operating as a SEAL platform in her later years, was decommissioned on 2 April 2002, the last boat of the original "41 for Freedom" submarines in commission, and the oldest submarine in the US Navy. Almost 37 years old, she held the record for the longest service lifetime of any nuclear-powered submarine. In the late 2010s, two boats, USS Daniel Webster and USS Sam Rayburn, though decommissioned, continued to serve as moored training ships, attached to Naval Nuclear Power School at Charleston, South Carolina until they too were eventually retired.

== Submarines by class ==
Class	Completed	Retired	Preserved	In commission	Polaris A1/A2		Polaris A3		Poseidon C3		Trident C4	
Class	Completed	Retired	Preserved	In commission	Yes/No	No. of boats	Yes/No	No. of boats	Yes/No	No. of boats	Yes/No	No. of boats
George Washington	5	5	0	1959–1985	✓	5	✓	5	✗	0	✗	0
Ethan Allen	5	5	0	1961–1992	✓	5	✓	5	✗	0	✗	0
Lafayette	9	9	0	1963–1994	✓	9	✓	9	✓	9	✗	0
James Madison	10	10	0	1964–1995	✗	0	✓	10	✓	10	✓	6
Benjamin Franklin	12	12	0	1965–2002	✗	0	✓	12	✓	12	✓	6

== Gallery ==
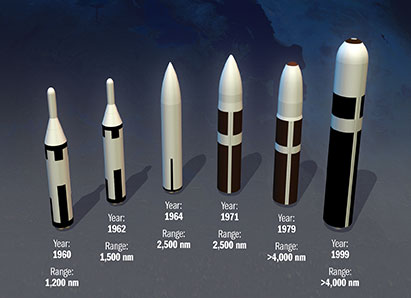
Weapons of the FBM submarines (left to right): Polaris A1, Polaris A2, Polaris A3, Poseidon, Trident I, and Trident II

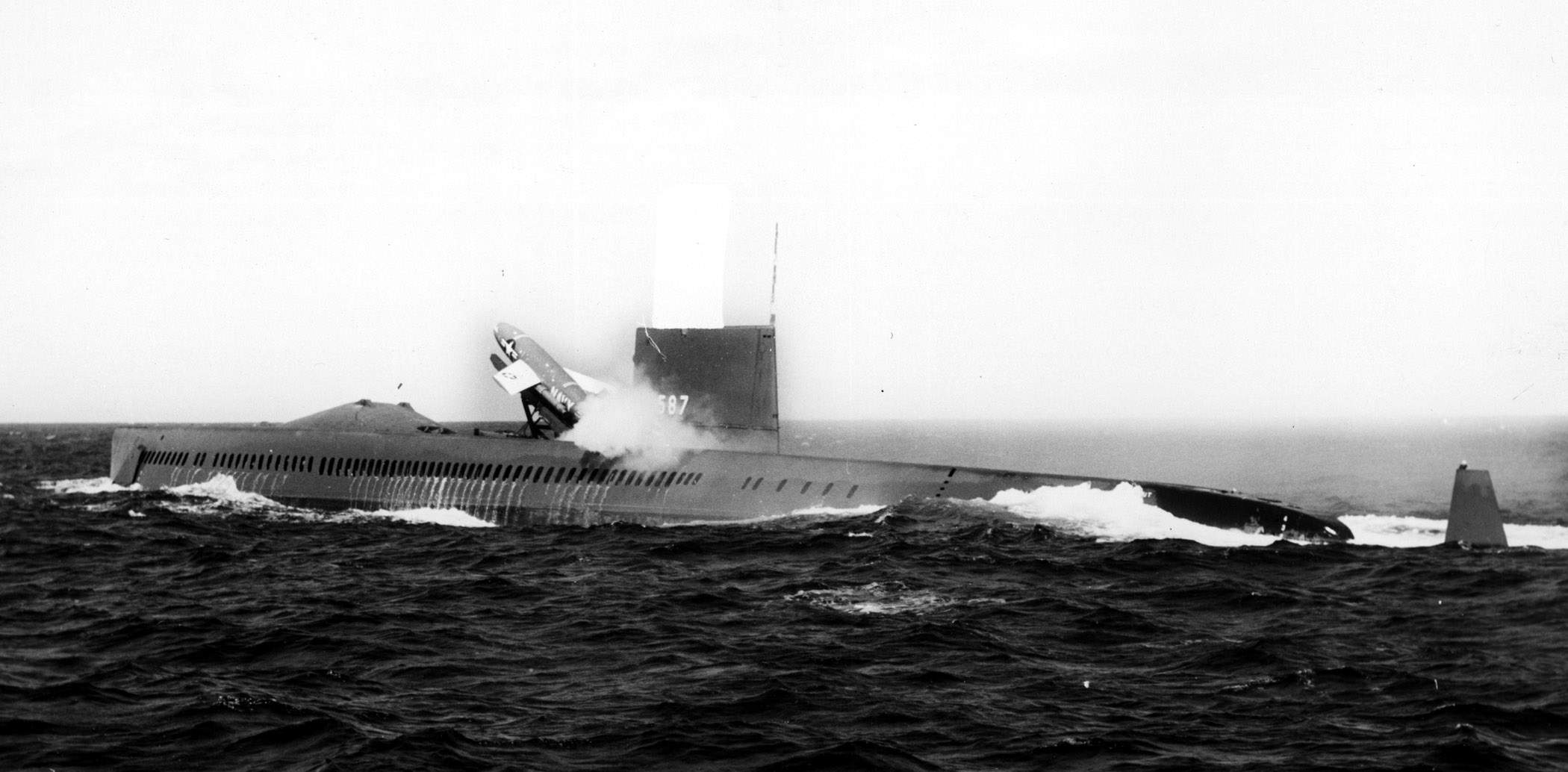
USS Halibut launches a Regulus missile. The limitations of the use of Regulus led to the development of the use of ballistic missiles from submarines.

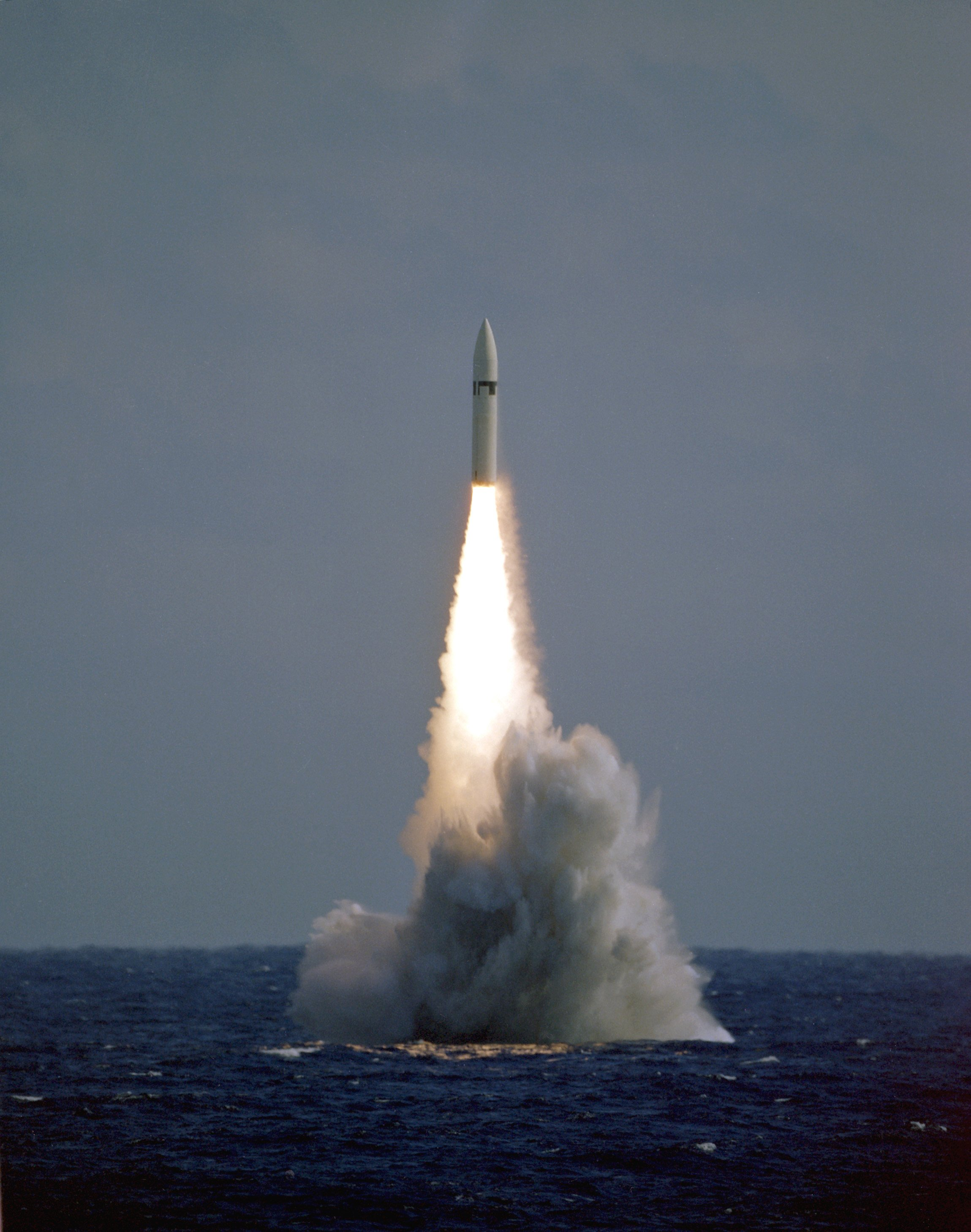
A Polaris A3 missile is launched from USS Robert E. Lee. The advent of Polaris allowed for a virtually undetectable launching platform, as the submarine no longer needed to surface to launch its weapons

== See also ==
- Regulus missile submarines
- Nuclear navy
- Nuclear warfare
- Nuclear strategy
- Vertical launching system
