= USS Henry L. Stimson =

Submarine of the United States

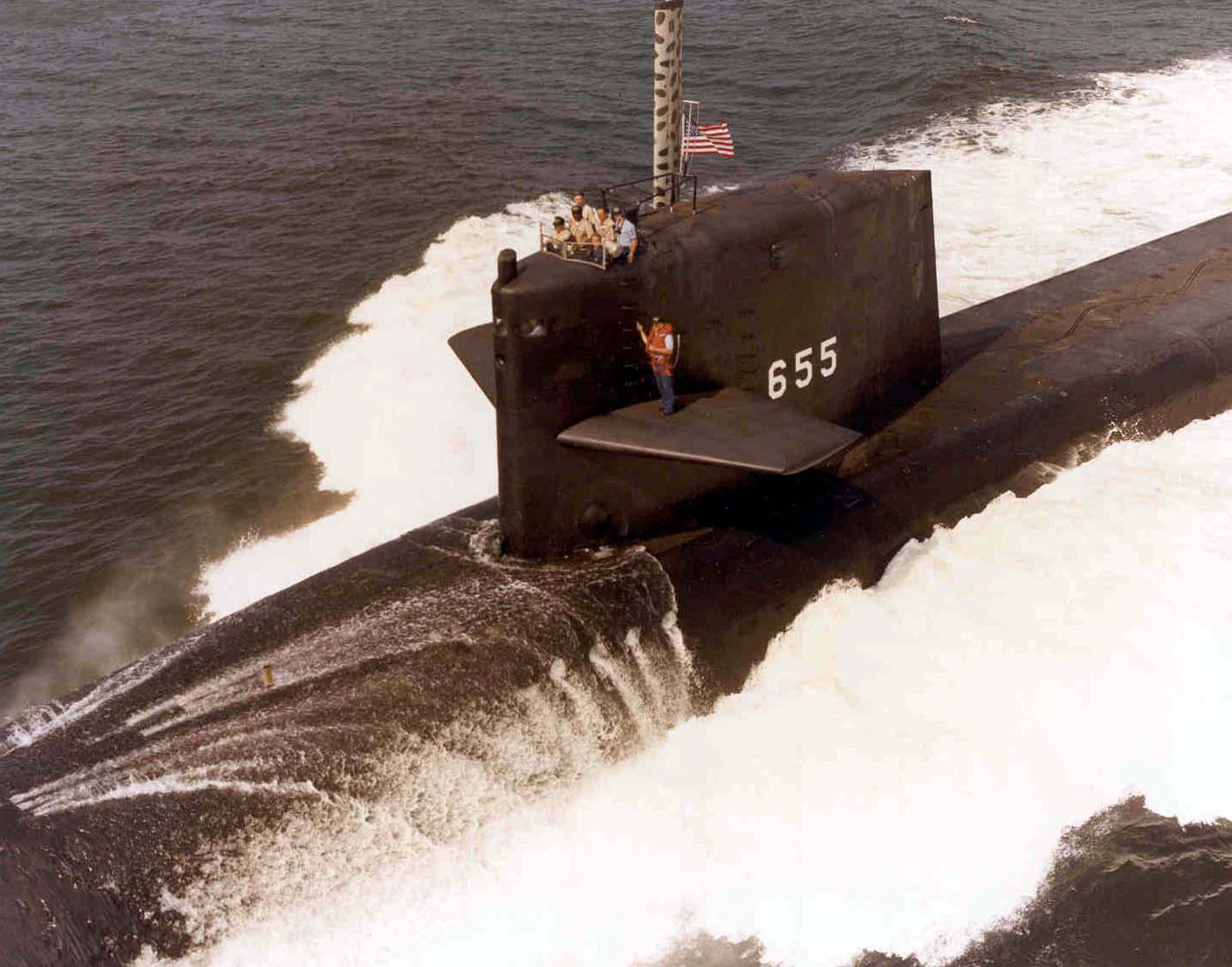
- USS Henry L. Stimson (SSBN-655) on 12 July 1984.

History

United States
- Name: USS Henry L. Stimson
- Namesake: Henry L. Stimson (1867–1950), U.S. Secretary of State (1929–1933) and U.S. Secretary of War (1911–1913, 1940–1945)
- Awarded: 29 July 1963
- Builder: General Dynamics Electric Boat, Groton, Connecticut
- Laid down: 4 April 1964
- Launched: 13 November 1965
- Sponsored by: Grace Murphy Dodd
- Commissioned: 20 August 1966
- Decommissioned: 5 May 1993
- Stricken: 5 May 1993
- Fate: Scrapping via Ship and Submarine Recycling Program completed 12 August 1994

General characteristics
- Class & type: Benjamin Franklin class nuclear-powered fleet ballistic missile submarine
- Displacement: 7,250 tons surfaced; 8,250 tons submerged
- Length: 425 feet (130 m)
- Beam: 33 feet (10 m)
- Draft: 31.5 feet (9.6 m)
- Installed power: 15,000 shp (11,185 kW)
- Propulsion: One S5W pressurized-water nuclear reactor, two geared steam turbines, one shaft
- Speed: 16–20 knots surfaced, 22–25 knots submerged
- Test depth: 1,300 feet (400 m)
- Complement: Two crews (Blue Crew and Gold Crew) of 13 officers and 130 enlisted men each
- Armament: 16 × ballistic missile tubes with one Polaris, later Poseidon, later Trident I ballistic missile each; 4 × 21-inch (533 mm) torpedo tubes

USS Henry L. Stimson (SSBN-655), a Benjamin Franklin class fleet ballistic missile submarine, was the only ship of the United States Navy to be named for Henry L. Stimson (1867–1950), who served as U.S. Secretary of State (1929–1933) and U.S. Secretary of War (1911–1913, 1940–1945).

== Construction and commissioning ==
The contract for the construction of Henry L. Stimson was awarded on 29 July 1963, and her keel was laid down on 4 April 1964 by the Electric Boat Division of General Dynamics Corporation in Groton, Connecticut. She was launched on 13 November 1965, sponsored by Grace Murphy Dodd, wife of Connecticut Senator Thomas J. Dodd, and was commissioned on 20 August 1966 with Captain Richard E. Jortberg commanding the Blue Crew and Commander Robert H. Weeks commanding the Gold Crew.

== Service history ==
Following shakedown, Henry L. Stimson was assigned to Submarine Squadron 10 at New London, Connecticut. On 23 February 1967 she put to sea from Charleston with the Blue crew on her first strategic deterrent patrol, armed with Polaris A3 ballistic missiles. By August 1967, her Blue and Gold crews had each completed one deterrent patrol. Ballistic submarines employed two crews, Blue and Gold, in order to facilitate continuous operation at sea, called "forward-presence" in USN parlance. While one crew was physically aboard the ship, the other crew had one month of R&R and then almost 2 months of training. At the end of a patrol, usually lasting approximately 75 days and usually spent entirely submerged, the ship returned to port and was met by the opposite crew. A week was spent in turnover and then the crews would trade places. After another 3 weeks of refitting and repairs, the ship would go on patrol and the cycle would continue.

From 1973 until the Trident Missile conversion in 1980, she continued to operate out of Rota, Spain with one visit back to Charleston in 1976(?) to replace the battery bank.

After 1980 until decommissioning, she operated out of Kings Bay Georgia, with the crew based in Charleston, SC.

== Decommissioning and disposal ==
Henry L. Stimson was both decommissioned and stricken from the Naval Vessel Register on 5 May 1993. Her scrapping via the U.S. Navy's Nuclear-Powered Ship and Submarine Recycling Program at Bremerton, Washington, was completed on 12 August 1994.
