= USS George Washington Carver =

Submarine of the United States

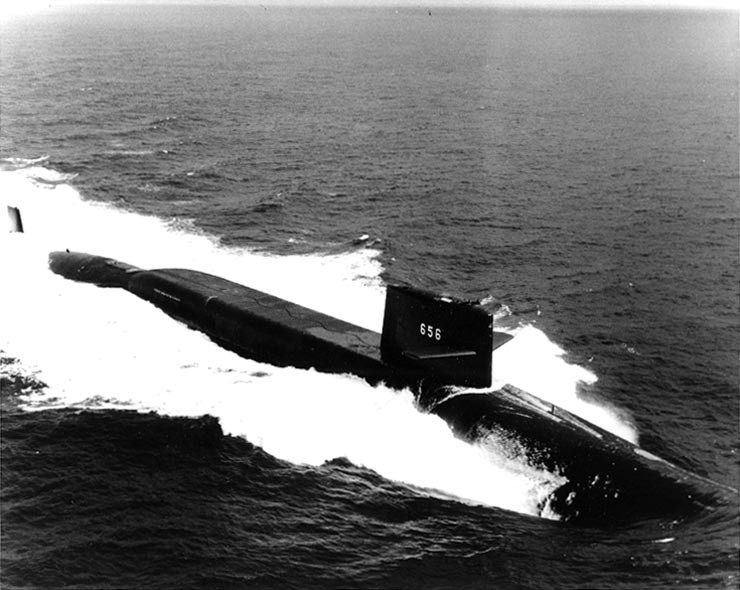
- USS George Washington Carver (SSBN-656) ca. June 1966

History

United States
- Name: USS George Washington Carver
- Namesake: George Washington Carver (1865–1943), an American researcher and inventor
- Awarded: 29 July 1963
- Builder: Newport News Shipbuilding and Dry Dock Company, Newport News, Virginia
- Laid down: 24 August 1964
- Launched: 14 August 1965
- Sponsored by: Miss Marian Anderson (1897-1993)
- Commissioned: 15 June 1966
- Decommissioned: 18 March 1993
- Stricken: 18 March 1993
- Motto: Strength Through Knowledge
- Fate: Scrapping via Ship and Submarine Recycling Program completed 21 March 1994

General characteristics
- Class & type: Benjamin Franklin class fleet ballistic missile submarine
- Displacement: 7,300 long tons (7,417 t) surfaced; 8,250 long tons (8,382 t) submerged
- Length: 425 ft (130 m)
- Beam: 33 ft (10 m)
- Draft: 33 ft (10 m)
- Installed power: 15,000 shp (11,185 kW)
- Propulsion: One S5W pressurized-water nuclear reactor, two geared steam turbines, one shaft
- Speed: Over 20 knots
- Test depth: 1,300 feet (400 m)
- Complement: Two crews (Blue Crew and Gold Crew) of 100 officers and enlisted men each
- Armament: 16 ballistic missile tubes with one Polaris, later Poseidon, ballistic missile each; 4 × 21 inches (530 mm) torpedo tubes

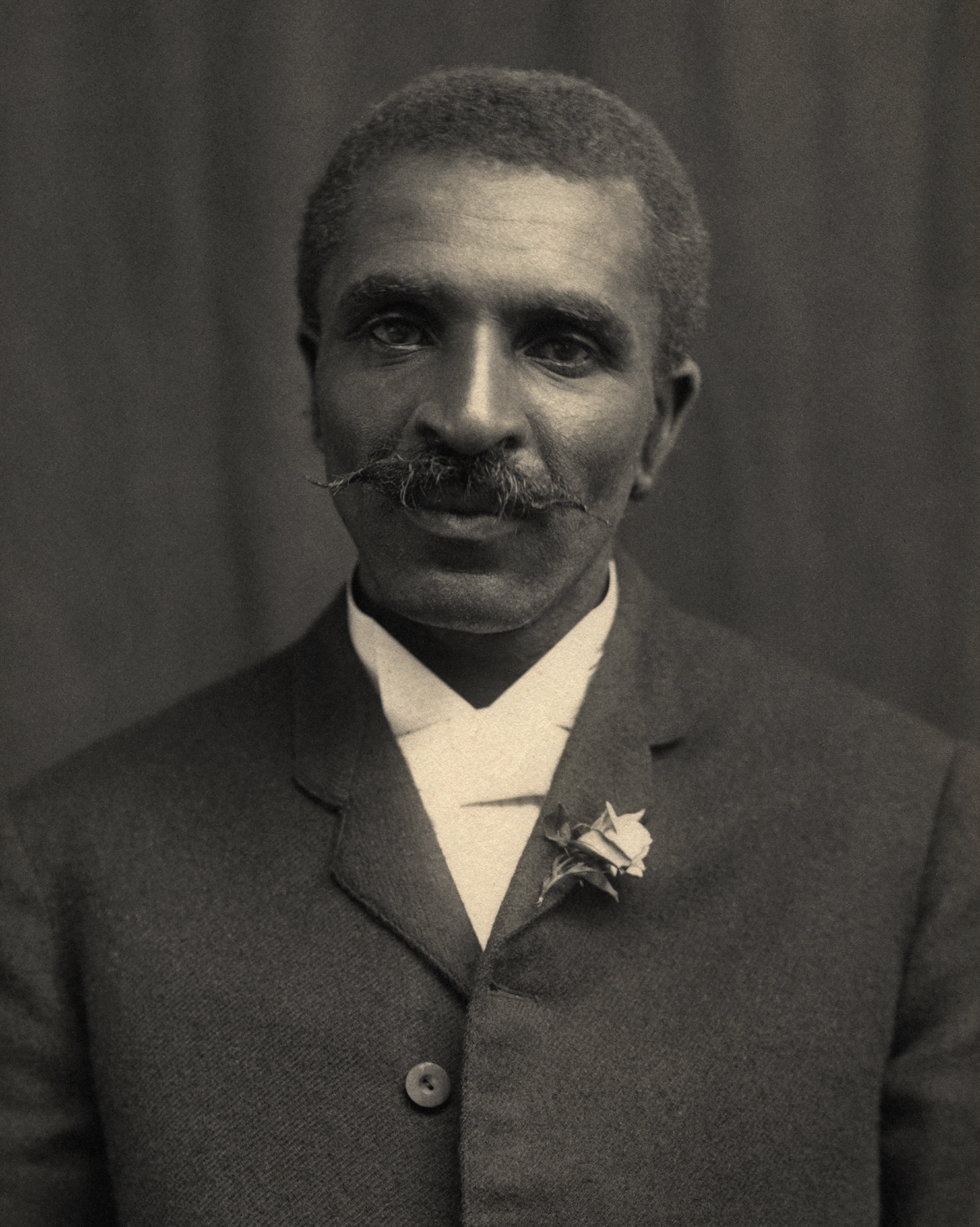
Botanist George Washington Carver

USS George Washington Carver (SSBN-656), a Benjamin Franklin class fleet ballistic missile submarine, was the second ship of the United States Navy to be named for George Washington Carver (1865–1943), an American researcher and inventor. The George Washington Carver was the last of 14 Polaris submarines built at Newport News Shipbuilding.

== Construction and commissioning ==
The contract for George Washington Carver's construction was awarded on 29 July 1963, and her keel was laid down on 24 August 1964 by the Newport News Shipbuilding and Dry Dock Company at Newport News, Virginia. She was launched on 14 August 1965, sponsored by African-American contralto Marian Anderson (1897–1993), and commissioned on 15 June 1966 with Captain R. D. Donavan in command of the Blue Crew and Lieutenant Commander Carl J. Lidel in command of the Gold Crew.

== Service history ==
Following shakedown, George Washington Carver's began her first strategic deterrent patrol on 12 December 1966. She operated out of Holy Loch, Scotland, the forward base for Submarine Squadron 14, until September 1971, when she transferred to Groton, Connecticut. For two months of special operations before entering the shipyard at Electric Boat Division, Groton, Connecticut. In November 1971, for reactor refueling and overhaul. George Washington Carver was in dry dock at Naval Station Rota, Spain for overhaul beginning February 1977. A team from Electric Boat Division Groton, CT was deployed to complete the overhaul/refit.

=== Conversion of missile tubes ===
In 1991, George Washington Carver's ballistic missile had missiles removed and tubes were filled with ballast at Naval Weapons Station, Charleston, South Carolina. The submarine and crew then received a change of homeport to Naval Submarine Base, Bangor, Washington and assisted on the west coast in various assignments before finally entering the Puget Sound Naval Shipyard at Bremerton, Washington.

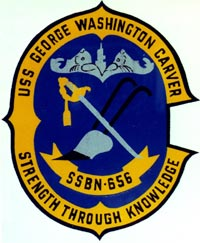
The insignia of USS George Washington Carver (SSBN-656).

== Decommissioning and disposal ==
George Washington Carver was both decommissioned and stricken from the Naval Vessel Register on 18 March 1993 at the Puget Sound Naval Shipyard in Bremerton, Washington, where her scrapping via the U.S. Navy's Ship and Submarine Recycling Program was completed on 12 March 1994.
