= USS Kamehameha =

Submarine of the United States

USS Kamehameha (SSBN-642) / (SSN-642)
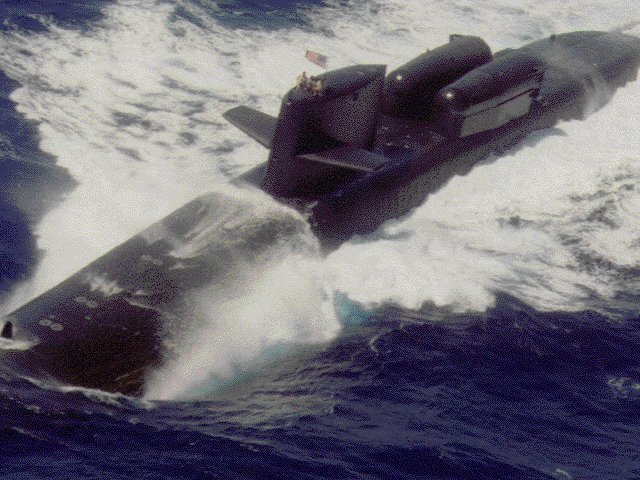
- USS Kamehameha (SSN-642) after her 1992 conversion to support Navy SEALS as an attack submarine

History

United States
- Namesake: Kamehameha I (c. 1758–1819), King of Hawaii (c. 1795–1819)
- Ordered: 31 August 1962
- Builder: Mare Island Naval Shipyard, Vallejo, California
- Laid down: 2 May 1963
- Launched: 16 January 1965
- Sponsored by: Mrs. Samuel Wilder King
- Commissioned: 10 December 1965
- Decommissioned: 2 April 2002
- Reclassified: Attack submarine (SSN-642) in 1992
- Stricken: 2 April 2002
- Motto: Imua (Hawaiian for 'Go forth and conquer')
- Nickname(s): "Dead Giveaway"
- Fate: Scrapping via Ship and Submarine Recycling Program begun October 2002; completed 28 February 2003

General characteristics
- Class & type: Benjamin Franklin-class submarine
- Displacement: 6,511 tons light, 7,334 tons full, 823 tons dead
- Length: 425 ft (130 m)
- Beam: 33 ft (10 m)
- Draft: 31 ft (9.4 m)
- Installed power: 15,000 shp (11,185 kW)
- Propulsion: One S5W pressurized-water nuclear reactor, two geared steam turbines, one shaft
- Speed: Over 20 knots (37 km/h; 23 mph)
- Test depth: 1,300 feet (400 m)
- Complement: Two crews (Blue Crew and Gold Crew) of 20 officers and 130 enlisted men each
- Armament: 16 × ballistic missile tubes (deactivated 1992); 4 × 21 in (533 mm) torpedo tubes (all forward)

USS Kamehameha (SSBN-642) was a Benjamin Franklin-class ballistic missile submarine and the only ship in the United States Navy to be named after Kamehameha I, the first King of Hawaii (c. 1758–1819). She is one of only two United States ships named after a monarch.^{a} She was later reclassified as an attack submarine and re-designated SSN-642.

The ship's motto was Imua, which roughly translates from Hawaiian as "go forth and conquer." Another motto used by her crew was Kam do, a play on the phrase "can do."

== Construction and commissioning ==
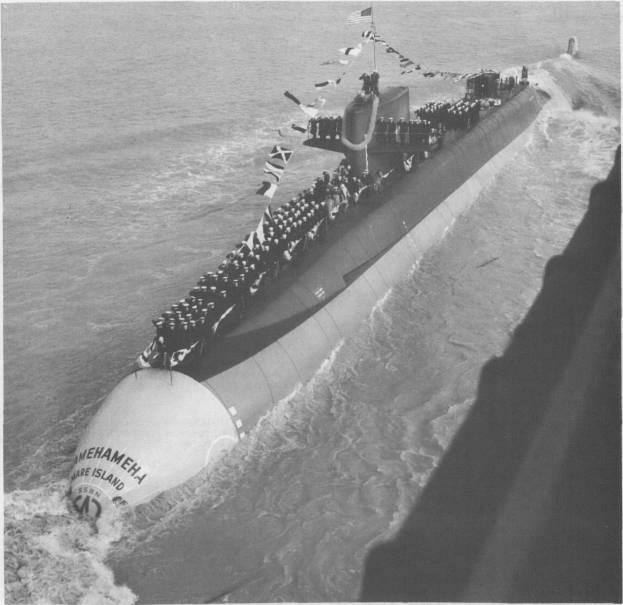
USS Kamehameha (SSBN-642) in her original configuration as a fleet ballistic missile submarine at her launching on 16 January 1965.

The contract to build Kamehameha was awarded to Mare Island Naval Shipyard in Vallejo, California on August 31, 1962. The Kamehameha was sponsored by Mrs. Pauline Nawahineokalai King (née Evans), widow of Samuel Wilder King, the eleventh Territorial Governor of Hawaii, and commissioned on December 10, 1965 with Commander Roth S. Leddick in command of the Blue Crew and Commander Robert W. Dickieson in command of the Gold Crew. Construction began on May 2, 1963 and she was launched on January 16, 1965.

Conducting deterrence patrols during the Cold War, Kamehameha's armament was 16 Poseidon ballistic missiles plus 10–12 Mark 48 heavy torpedoes non-ADCAP (advanced capability).

== Service history ==
Kamehameha was built by the Mare Island Naval Shipyard in Vallejo, California. Upon completion, she went on her first sea trials off the coast of California. She conducted missile firing tests at Cape Canaveral, Florida, after which she sailed to Pearl Harbor, Hawaii. Although Pearl Harbor was her home port until 1970, she made all of her Pacific patrols out of Apra Harbor, Guam, to permit maximum time on patrol station with a minimum transit time to and from port.

Kamehameha joined the United States Pacific Fleet and the Blue Crew began her first deterrent patrol on 6 August 1966. In November 1966, the Gold Crew relieved the Blue Crew and returned to patrol. On her last Pacific patrol, the Blue Crew took her to the Pacific Missile Test Range to fire two dummy warhead missiles. The Blue Crew then took Kamehameha into port at Pearl Harbor to prepare for transfer to the Atlantic Fleet.

The Gold Crew relieved the Blue Crew and spent the next few weeks in Honolulu allowing the people of Hawaii to go aboard and see the submarine named in honor of the King of Hawaii. In early June 1970, with the Gold Crew operating the boat, Kamehameha got underway for Charleston, South Carolina via the Panama Canal for duty with Submarine Squadron 18 based at Charleston. The submerged transit to the Panama Canal took approximately seven days, and upon arrival off the coast of Panama, Kamehameha surfaced and was met by the Panama Canal pilot who took her through. The passage through the canal was given priority by the canal authorities, and so little time was spent waiting to enter. The boat was the object of considerable curiosity from those on ships nearby, and from the onlookers ashore. Once clear of the canal, Kamehameha submerged again and began the final leg of the transit, passing through the Caribbean and out into the Atlantic.

Kamehameha surfaced just east of the Charleston harbor sea buoy and waited for the tug to bring Miss Charleston on board. The information about Miss Charleston was in Commander Submarine Squadron 18's message of instructions for Kamehameha's arrival and had caused excitement among the bachelor junior officers. Both the Officer of the Deck, a lieutenant and the Junior Officer of the Deck were scanning the channel. One lookout reported a Navy tug just appearing in the distance. All binoculars were trained on the tug, and the OOD reported, "I see a female standing on the bow!" Thirty seconds later, he then reported, "Captain, that's not Miss Charleston, that's your wife!" The remark was relayed to a reporter who also had arrived on the tug, and the next day, in the Charleston newspaper, the Society page bore the headline, "That's Not Miss Charleston, That's the Captain's Wife!" Miss Charleston had gone to the wrong pier in the shipyard and thus missed the boat.

Shortly after Kamehameha's arrival, she was ordered to sail on patrol earlier than scheduled to fill in for another boat that had suffered a casualty to the main engines. Kamehameha exchanged all 16 missiles in less than 24 hours and replaced the ship's battery. She then took Commander Submarine Flotilla Six, on board and proceeded to sea for four days of sea trials, allowing the flotilla commander to see the capabilities of the new boat. In the event, Kamehameha passed with flying colors and embarked on her first Atlantic Fleet deterrent patrol. She made two more patrols, one Blue and one Gold, and in April 1971, was taken by the Blue Crew into the shipyard for a major overhaul, including refitting for the newer Poseidon missile system, and refueling of the reactor. On 31 May 1971, the Gold Crew was disbanded during the overhaul.

Between 1974 and 1978 she belonged to Submarine Group 2, Squadron 16; homeported in New London, Connecticut, and advance-based in Rota, Spain. She conducted nuclear deterrent patrols in the Atlantic and vicinity without incident in 1975 and 1976. During September–November 1976, Kamehameha spent time in Charleston, South Carolina, conducting SPECOPS with other units, then onto the AUTEC range for qualifications before resuming patrol duties after her return to Rota.

The Kamehameha entered Portsmouth Naval Shipyard (PNSY) in 1981 for a non-refueling overhaul. She finished sea trials in late 1982 and worked her way from Groton, Connecticut, to Port Canaveral, Florida, and then to Charleston for her complement of missiles. She then transferred to Holy Loch, Scotland. During the late 1980s, Kamehameha completed a refueling overhaul at Portsmouth Naval Shipyard in Kittery, Maine. Following completion, she transferred to Groton in December 1989 for re-certification inspections and training. During this period, the Gold Crew launched the last Poseidon C-3 (no tactical warheads installed) from missile tube No. 4 off Port Canaveral, Florida. Following certification, she returned to deterrent patrol operations in November 1990 and returned to Holy Loch, Scotland. In August 1991, with the deactivation of the Poseidon missile system, Kamehameha transferred from Holy Loch to Groton and performed non-deterrent patrol operations until July 1992 when she left for conversion.

For much of her operational career, Kamehameha was based in Rota, Spain.

== Conversion to attack submarine ==
In September 1992 through July 1993, at Mare Island Naval Shipyard in Vallejo, California, Kamehameha was converted to a Dry Deck Shelter/swimmer delivery platform, reclassified as an attack submarine, and given hull number SSN-642; her ballistic missile capability was removed, and she carried only torpedoes as armament. After her conversion, there was only one crew, and her subsequent missions included SEAL special warfare operations. Following conversion, Kamehameha transferred to Pearl Harbor, Hawaii, for the remainder of her operational career.

== Decommissioning and disposal ==
Kamehameha was decommissioned on 2 April 2002 and stricken from the Naval Vessel Register the same day. She was the last of the original 41 for Freedom fleet ballistic missile submarines in service, and the oldest submarine in the United States Navy at the time of her decommissioning. The wardroom of the oldest submarine in the fleet carried Richard O'Kane's personal cribbage board, and upon Kamehameha's decommissioning the board was transferred to the next oldest boat, USS Parche (SSN-683). Upon her decommissioning, Kamehameha had been the longest serving nuclear-powered submarine in history, with a total service period exceeding 37 years. This was exceeded by the Los Angeles-class submarine USS Bremerton in July 2018, prior to her own decommissioning on 18 May 2021.

Kamehameha's scrapping via the Nuclear-Powered Ship and Submarine Recycling Program at Bremerton, Washington, began in October 2002 and was completed on 28 February 2003.

== Commemoration ==
Kamehameha's commissioning gifts from the State of Hawaii, including her bust of King Kamehameha I, an Acacia koa wooden plate used for eating, bow and spear, and the wardroom monkeypod wood table, are on display at Pearl Harbor, Hawaii, at the Pacific Fleet Submarine Museum. Her periscopes have been donated to Deterrent Park on Submarine Base Bangor, Washington, to become part of the USS Woodrow Wilson (SSBN-624) exhibit.

== Notes ==
^a The other was the Continental Navy's USS Alfred.
