= General Dynamics Electric Boat =

Submarine builder for U.S. Navy

Coordinates: 41.344343°N 72.079526°W

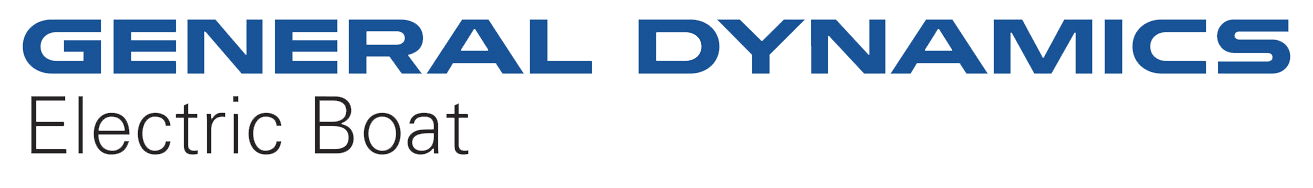
- Type: Subsidiary
- Industry: Shipbuilding
- Founded: 1899; 127 years ago
- Founder: Isaac Rice
- Headquarters: Groton, Connecticut, U.S.
- Key people: Mark Rayha (president)
- Number of employees: 23,000+ (2026)
- Parent: General Dynamics
- Website: www.gdeb.com

General Dynamics Electric Boat (GDEB) is a subsidiary of General Dynamics Corporation. It has been the primary builder of submarines for the United States Navy for more than 100 years. The company's main facilities are a shipyard in Groton, Connecticut; a hull-fabrication and outfitting facility in Quonset Point, Rhode Island; and a design and engineering facility in New London, Connecticut.

== History ==
The company was founded in 1899 by Isaac Rice as the Electric Boat Company to build John Philip Holland's submersible ship designs, which were developed at Lewis Nixon's Crescent Shipyard in Elizabeth, New Jersey. Holland VI was the first submarine that this shipyard built, which became USS Holland when it was commissioned into the United States Navy on April 11, 1900 — the first submarine to be officially commissioned. The success of Holland VI created a demand for follow-up models (A class or Plunger class) that began with the prototype submersible Fulton built at Electric Boat. Some foreign navies were interested in Holland's latest submarine designs, and so purchased the rights to build them under licensing contracts through the company; these included the United Kingdom's Royal Navy, the Imperial Japanese Navy, the Imperial Russian Navy, except the Royal Netherlands Navy.

From 1907 to 1925, Electric Boat designed submarines for the U.S. Navy and subcontracted their construction to the Fore River Shipyard in Quincy, Massachusetts, and other shipyards. During this era, the company designed submarines of the B, C, D, E, K, L, M, N, AA-1, O, R, and S classes.

During the World War I era, the company and its subsidiaries (notably the Electric Launch Company, or Elco) built 85 submarines via subcontractors and 722 submarine chasers for the U.S. Navy, and 580 eighty-foot motor launches for the British Royal Navy.

=== Interwar ===
After the war, the U.S. Navy did not order another submarine from Electric Boat until Cuttlefish in 1931. Cuttlefish was the first submarine built at EB's plant in Groton, Connecticut, which has been its primary submarine manufacturing facility ever since. EB was the lead yard for several classes of submarines (Perch, Salmon, Sargo, Tambor, Gar, Mackerel, and Gato) prior to World War II.

From the early 1930s to the late 1950s, EB was one of only two major U.S. submarine manufacturers (the other being the Portsmouth Navy Yard). Three other yards — Manitowoc, Mare Island, and Cramp — produced submarines only during World War II. Several other yards — New York Shipbuilding, Ingalls, and Fore River Shipyard, as well as Mare Island — built submarines in the late 1950s through the early 1970s. Since 1974, only Electric Boat and Newport News have built submarines for the U.S. Navy.

==== Allegations of war profiteering ====
The Nye Committee (1934–1936) heavily scrutinized the Electric Boat Company for its role in fueling a naval arms race between Peru and Chile during the 1920s. Investigators uncovered evidence of a cartel agreement between Electric Boat and the British armaments manufacturer Vickers-Armstrongs, wherein the two companies coordinated to divide the South American market rather than compete. The Committee found that Electric Boat, which held a monopoly on American submarine manufacturing, supplied submarines to the Peruvian Navy while Vickers simultaneously marketed surface vessels and counter-measures to the Chilean Navy. This strategy, sometimes referred to as the "Systeme Zaharoff," exploited the lingering diplomatic tensions of the War of the Pacific to ensure that the acquisition of weaponry by one nation would necessitate a reciprocal purchase by its rival.

Central to the Committee's findings was the discovery of correspondence between L.Y. Spear, vice president of Electric Boat, and Sir Charles Craven of Vickers, which revealed active opposition to diplomatic peace efforts. In a letter dated 1928, Spear complained to Craven that the "pernicious activities" of the U.S. State Department in mediating the Tacna-Arica dispute were "putting the brake on armament orders." The investigation further revealed that the companies employed local agents, such as Commander Aubance in Peru, to bribe officials and disseminate alarmist propaganda. These findings were instrumental in the Committee's conclusion that the private armaments industry actively undermined U.S. foreign policy to preserve regional instability for financial gain.

=== World War II ===
During World War II, the company built 74 submarines at the Groton plant, while Elco built nearly 400 PT boats; Electric Boat ranked 77th among United States corporations in the value of World War II military production contracts.

=== Postwar ===
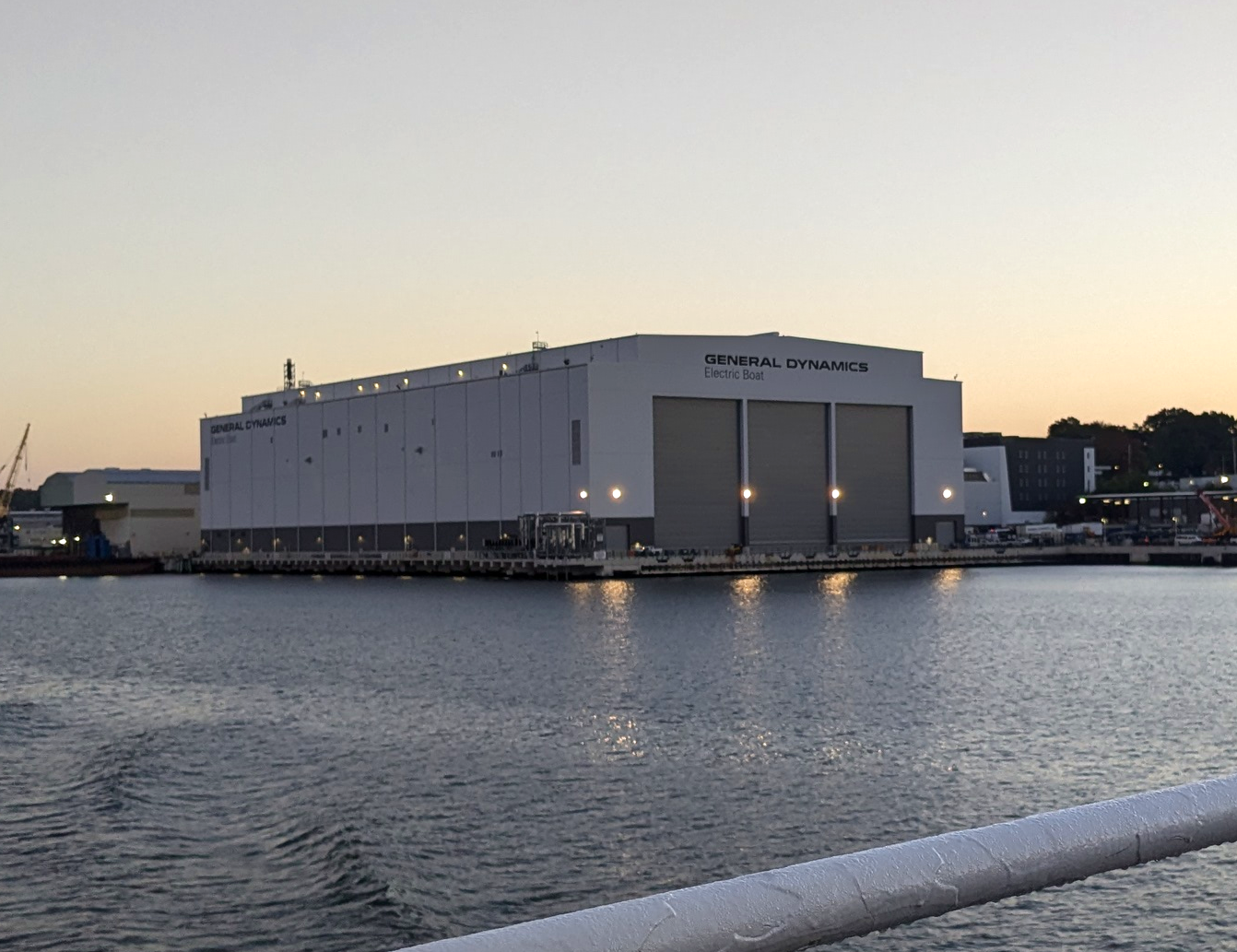
Electric Boat facility in Groton, CT

In 1952, Electric Boat was reorganized as General Dynamics Corporation under John Jay Hopkins. General Dynamics acquired Convair the following year, and the holding company assumed the "General Dynamics" name while the submarine-building operation reverted to the "Electric Boat" name.

Electric Boat built the first nuclear submarine, USS Nautilus, which was launched in January 1954, and the first ballistic missile submarine, USS George Washington, in 1959. Submarines of the Ohio, Los Angeles, Seawolf, and Virginia classes were also constructed by Electric Boat. In 2002, EB conducted preservation work on Nautilus, preparing her for her berth at the U.S. Navy Submarine Force Library and Museum in Groton, Connecticut where she now resides as a museum.

From the mid-1970s to the present, EB has been one of only two submarine manufacturers in the United States, with the other being Newport News Shipbuilding in Virginia.

In April 2014, EB was awarded a $17.8 billion contract with Naval Sea Systems Command for ten Block IV Virginia-class attack submarines. It is the largest single shipbuilding contract in the service's history. The company builds the submarine along with Huntington Ingalls Industries Newport News Shipbuilding. The boats of Block IV Virginias will cost less than Block III, as Electric Boat reduced the cost of the submarines by increasing efficiency in the construction process. The submarines of this type will build on the improvements to allow them to spend less time in the yard. In 2019, EB received a contract with Naval Sea Systems Command to begin procuring materials for the Block V variant of the Virginia-class. This upgrade brings the Virginia payload module, which enables Tomahawk missiles to be carried by the submarine.

In July 2026, EB was awarded, along with Huntington Ingalls Industries, $29.5 billion in contracts for five Columbia-class submarines, $42.1 billion for nine Virginia-Class submarines, and additional support for shipyard infrastructure.

==== 1980s structural welding defect cover up ====
In the early 1980s, structural welding defects had been covered up by falsified inspection records, and this led to significant delays and expenses in the delivery of several submarines being built at Electric Boat's shipyard. In some cases, the repairs resulted in practically dismantling and then rebuilding what had been a nearly completed submarine. The yard tried to pass the vast cost overruns directly on to the Navy, while Admiral Hyman G. Rickover demanded from the general manager of Electric Boat's shipyard, P. Takis Veliotis, that the yard meet its quality specifications.

The Navy settled with General Dynamics in 1981, paying out $634 million of $843 million in Los Angeles-class submarines cost-overrun and reconstruction claims. As it happened, the Navy was also the yard's insurer, liable to compensate the company for losses and other mishaps. The concept of reimbursing General Dynamics under these conditions was initially considered "preposterous," in the words of Secretary of the Navy John Lehman, but the eventual legal basis of General Dynamics' reimbursement claims to the Navy for the company's poor workmanship included insurance compensation. Veliotis was subsequently indicted by a federal grand jury under racketeering and fraud charges in 1983 for demanding $1.3 million in kickbacks from a subcontractor. He escaped into exile and a life of luxury in his native Greece, where he remained a fugitive from justice.

== Submarines built ==
This is a list of submarines built at Electric Boat's Groton plant and does not include earlier submarines built by other companies under contract to Electric Boat.

General Dynamics Electric Boat built every unique U.S. Navy submarine after 1931, except the Halibut (SSGN-587) and the purely experimental Albacore (AGSS-569) and Dolphin (AGSS-555) submarines.

General Dynamics Electric Boat built at least one unit of every class of serially-produced U.S. Navy submarines after 1931, except the Grayback and Barbel classes.

Cachalot class

EB built 1 of 2 total in the class

Name	Hull number	Type	Commissioned	Status
Cuttlefish	SS-171	diesel-electric	8 June 1934	Sold for breaking up, 12 February 1947

Porpoise class

5 of 10 total in class

Name	Hull number	Type	Commissioned	Status
Shark	SS-174	diesel-electric	25 January 1936	Probably sunk by Japanese destroyer Yamakaze east of Manado, 11 February 1942
Tarpon	SS-175	diesel-electric	12 March 1936	Sold for breaking up, 8 June 1957; foundered off Cape Hatteras, 26 August 1957
Perch	SS-176	diesel-electric	19 November 1936	Scuttled in the Java Sea on 3 March 1942 after being damaged by Japanese destroyers
Pickerel	SS-177	diesel-electric	26 January 1937	Sunk by Japanese vessels north of Honshū on 3 April 1943
Permit	SS-178	diesel-electric	17 March 1937	Sold for scrap on 28 June 1958

Salmon class

3 of 6 total in class

Name	Hull number	Type	Commissioned	Status
Salmon	SS-182	composite diesel-hydraulic and diesel-electric	15 March 1938	Constructive loss due to battle damage; broken up for scrap, 1946
Seal	SS-183	composite diesel-hydraulic and diesel-electric	30 April 1938	Sold for scrap, 6 May 1957
Skipjack	SS-184	composite diesel-hydraulic and diesel-electric	30 June 1938	Sunk in Operation Crossroads atomic bomb test, 25 July 1946; raised 2 September 1946; sunk as a target off southern California, 11 August 1948

Sargo class

5 of 10 total in class

Name	Hull number	Type	Commissioned	Status
Sargo	SS-188	composite diesel-hydraulic and diesel-electric	7 February 1939	Sold for scrap, 19 May 1947
Saury	SS-189	composite diesel-hydraulic and diesel-electric	3 April 1939	Sold for scrap, 19 May 1947
Spearfish	SS-190	composite diesel-hydraulic and diesel-electric	19 July 1939	Sold for scrap, 19 May 1947
Seadragon	SS-194	diesel-electric	23 October 1939	Sold for scrap, 2 July 1948
Sealion	SS-195	diesel-electric	27 November 1939	Scuttled at Cavite on 25 December 1941 after being damaged by Japanese aircraft on 10 December 1941

Tambor class

6 of 12 total in class, all diesel-electric

Name	Hull number	Commissioned	Status
Tambor	SS-198	3 June 1940	Sold for scrap, 5 December 1959
Tautog	SS-199	3 July 1940	Sold for scrap, 1 July 1960
Thresher	SS-200	27 August 1940	Sold for scrap, 18 March 1948
Gar	SS-206	14 April 1941	Sold for scrap, 11 December 1959
Grampus	SS-207	23 May 1941	Possibly sunk by Japanese destroyers in Blackett Strait, 5 March 1943
Grayback	SS-208	30 June 1941	Sunk by Japanese aircraft south of Okinawa, 27 February 1944

Mackerel class

1 of 2 total in class

Name	Hull number	Type	Commissioned	Status
Mackerel	SS-204	diesel-electric	31 March 1941	Sold for scrap, 24 April 1947

Gato class

41 of 77 total in class, all diesel-electric

Name	Hull number	Commissioned	Status
Gato	SS-212	31 December 1941	Sold for scrap, 25 July 1960
Greenling	SS-213	21 January 1942	Sold for scrap, 21 June 1960
Grouper	SS-214	12 February 1942	Sold for scrap, 11 August 1970
Growler	SS-215	20 March 1942	Sunk by Japanese vessels west of the Philippines, 8 November 1944
Grunion	SS-216	11 April 1942	Sunk off of Kiska around 30 July 1942, cause unknown
Guardfish	SS-217	8 May 1942	Sunk as a target off Block Island, 10 October 1961
Albacore	SS-218	1 June 1942	Probably mined off of northern Hokkaidō, 7 November 1944
Amberjack	SS-219	19 June 1942	Sunk by Japanese torpedo boat Hiyodori and SC-18 off Rabaul, 16 February 1943
Barb	SS-220	8 July 1942	Transferred to Italy on 13 December 1954
Blackfish	SS-221	22 July 1942	Sold for scrap on 4 May 1959
Bluefish	SS-222	24 May 1943	Sold for scrap, 8 June 1960
Bonefish	SS-223	31 May 1943	Sunk by Japanese vessels in Toyama Wan, Honshū, 18 June 1945
Cod	SS-224	21 June 1943	Museum ship currently moored in Cleveland, Ohio's North Coast Harbor at the USS Cod Submarine Memorial since 1 May 1976.
Cero	SS-225	4 July 1943	Sold for scrap, October 1970
Corvina	SS-226	6 August 1943	Sunk by Japanese submarine I-176 south of Truk Lagoon, 16 November 1943
Darter	SS-227	7 September 1943	Grounded in the Palawan Strait and scuttled on 24 October 1944
Angler	SS-240	1 October 1943	Sold for scrap, 1 February 1974
Bashaw	SS-241	25 October 1943	Sold for scrap, 1 July 1972
Bluegill	SS-242	11 November 1943	Scuttled as a trainer off Hawaii, 3 December 1970
Bream	SS-243	24 January 1944	Sunk as a target off California, 7 November 1969
Cavalla	SS-244	29 February 1944	Museum ship at Galveston, Texas as of 21 January 1971
Cobia	SS-245	29 March 1944	Memorial at Manitowoc, Wisconsin, 17 August 1970
Croaker	SS-246	21 April 1944	Museum ship at Groton, Connecticut on 27 June 1976
Dace	SS-247	23 July 1943	Converted to GUPPY IB and transferred to Italy, 31 January 1955
Dorado	SS-248	28 August 1943	Sunk, off Panama on 12 October 1943
Flasher	SS-249	25 September 1943	Sold for scrap 8 June 1963, conning tower is a memorial at Groton, Connecticut
Flier	SS-250	18 October 1943	Mined in the Balabac Strait, 13 August 1944
Flounder	SS-251	29 November 1943	Decommissioned 2 February 1960
Gabilan	SS-252	28 December 1943	Sold for scrap, 11 January 1960
Gunnel	SS-253	20 August 1942	Sold for scrap, December 1959
Gurnard	SS-254	18 September 1942	Sold for scrap, 29 October 1961
Haddo	SS-255	9 October 1942	Sold for scrap, 4 May 1959
Hake	SS-256	30 October 1942	Sold for scrap, 5 December 1972
Harder	SS-257	2 December 1942	Sunk by enemy vessels off Dasol Bay, Luzon, 24 August 1944|-
Hoe	SS-258	16 December 1942	Sold for scrap, 10 September 1960
Jack	SS-259	6 January 1943	Transferred to Greece, 21 April 1958
Lapon	SS-260	23 January 1943	Transferred to Greece, 10 August 1957
Mingo	SS-261	12 February 1943	Transferred to Japan unmodified, 15 August 1955
Muskallunge	SS-262	15 March 1943	Transferred to Brazil unmodified, 18 January 1957
Paddle	SS-263	29 March 1943	Transferred to Brazil unmodified, 18 January 1957
Pargo	SS-264	26 April 1943	Sold for scrap, 16 May 1961

Balao class

40 of 120 total in class, all diesel-electric

Name	Hull number	Commissioned	Status
Perch	SS-313	7 January 1944	Sold for scrap, 15 January 1973
Shark	SS-314	14 February 1944	Sunk by Harukaze 24 October 1944.
Sealion	SS-315	8 March 1944	Sunk as target 8 July 1978.
Barbel	SS-316	3 April 1944	Sunk by Japanese aircraft 4 February 1945.
Barbero	SS-317	29 April 1944	Sunk as target 7 October 1964.
Baya	SS-318	20 May 1944	Sold for scrap, 12 October 1973.
Becuna	SS-319	27 May 1944	Museum ship at Philadelphia, 21 June 1976.
Bergall	SS-320	12 June 1944	Transferred to Turkey 18 October 1958, sold to Turkey 15 February 1973.
Besugo	SS-321	19 June 1944	Transferred to Italy, 31 May 1966. Returned for scrapping, 20 June 1977.
Blackfin	SS-322	4 July 1944	Sunk as target 13 May 1973.
Caiman	SS-323	17 July 1944	Transferred to Turkey, 30 June 1972.
Blenny	SS-324	27 June 1944	Scuttled off Ocean City, Maryland, 7 June 1989.
Blower	SS-325	10 August 1944	Transferred to Turkey, 16 November 1950.
Blueback	SS-326	28 August 1944	Transferred to Turkey, 2 May 1948.
Boarfish	SS-327	28 August 1944	Transferred to Turkey, 23 May 1948. Returned for scrapping, 1 January 1974.
Charr	SS-328	23 September 1944	Sold for scrap, 17 August 1972.
Chub	SS-329	21 October 1944	Transferred to Turkey, 25 May 1948. Ultimately returned to U.S. custody and scrapped.
Brill	SS-330	26 October 1944	Transferred to Turkey, 25 May 1948.
Bugara	SS-331	15 November 1944	Foundered while under tow, 1 June 1971.
Bullhead	SS-332	4 December 1944	Sunk by Japanese aircraft, 6 August 1945.
Bumper	SS-333	9 December 1944	Transferred to Turkey, 16 November 1950
Cabezon	SS-334	30 December 1944	Sold for scrap, 28 December 1971.
Dentuda	SS-335	30 December 1944	Sold for scrap, 12 February 1969.
Capitaine	SS-336	26 January 1945	Transferred to Italy, 5 March 1966. Sold to Italy, 5 December 1977, and disposed of.
Carbonero	SS-337	7 February 1945	Sunk as a target off Pearl Harbor, 27 April 1975.
Carp	SS-338	28 February 1945	Sold for scrap, 26 July 1973.
Catfish	SS-339	19 March 1945	Transferred to Argentina, 1 July 1971.
Entemedor	SS-340	6 April 1945	Transferred to Turkey, on 31 July 1972; sold to Turkey, on 1 August 1973.
Chivo	SS-341	28 April 1945	Transferred to Argentina, 1 July 1971.
Chopper	SS-342	25 May 1945	Sank off Cape Hatteras, 21 July 1976, while being rigged as a tethered underwater target.
Clamagore	SS-343	28 June 1945	Museum in Charleston SC; scrapped summer 2022
Cobbler	SS-344	8 August 1945	Transferred to Turkey, 21 November 1973.
Cochino	SS-345	25 August 1945	Sunk by battery explosion and fire off Norway, 26 August 1949.
Corporal	SS-346	9 November 1945	Transferred to Turkey, 21 November 1973.
Cubera	SS-347	19 December 1945	Transferred to Venezuela, 5 January 1972.
Cusk	SS-348	5 February 1946	Sold for scrap, 26 June 1972.
Diodon	SS-349	18 March 1946	Sold for scrap, 12 May 1972.
Dogfish	SS-350	29 April 1946	Sold to Brazil, 28 July 1972.
Greenfish	SS-351	7 June 1946	Transferred to Brazil, 19 December 1973.
Halfbeak	SS-352	22 July 1946	Sold for scrap, 13 June 1972.

Tench class

1 of 29 total in class

Name	Hull number	Type	Commissioned	Status
Corsair	SS-435	diesel-electric	8 November 1946	Sold for scrap, 8 November 1963.

Barracuda class

1 of 3 total in class

Name	Hull number	Type	Commissioned	Status
Barracuda	SSK-1	diesel-electric	10 November 1951	Sold for scrap, 21 March 1974.

Tang class

3 of 6 total in class

Name	Hull number	Type	Commissioned	Status
Trigger	SS-564	diesel-electric	31 March 1952	Transferred to Italy on 10 July 1973. Decommissioned in 1986.
Trout	SS-566	diesel-electric	27 June 1952	Transferred to Iran 19 December 1978; Scrapped 27 February 2009.
Harder	SS-568	diesel-electric	19 August 1952	Sold to Italy, 1974. Decommissioned and scrapped in 1988.

Nautilus class

Unique submarine

Name	Hull number	Type	Commissioned	Status
Nautilus	SSN-571	nuclear-electric	30 September 1954	Museum ship since 20 May 1982 as part of the Submarine Force Library and museum.

T-1 class

1 of 2 total in class

Name	Hull number	Type	Commissioned	Status
Mackerel	SST-1	diesel-electric	9 October 1953	Sunk as target 18 October 1978.

Darter class

Unique submarine

Name	Hull number	Type	Commissioned	Status
Darter	SS-576	diesel-electric	20 October 1956	Sunk as a target, 7 January 1992.

Seawolf class

Unique submarine

Name	Hull number	Type	Commissioned	Status
Seawolf	SSN-575	nuclear-electric	30 March 1957	Disposed of by submarine recycling 30 September 1997.

Skate class

1 of 4 total in class

Name	Hull number	Type	Commissioned	Status
Skate	SSN-578	nuclear-electric	23 December 1957	Disposed of by submarine recycling 6 March 1995.

Skipjack class

2 of 6 total in class

Name	Hull number	Type	Commissioned	Status
Skipjack	SSN-585	nuclear-electric	15 April 1959	Disposed of by submarine recycling 1 September 1998.
Scorpion	SSN-589	nuclear-electric	29 July 1960	Lost with a crew of 99 on 22 May 1968; cause of sinking unknown.

Triton class

Unique submarine

Name	Hull number	Type	Commissioned	Status
Triton	SSRN-586	nuclear-electric	10 November 1959	Disposed of by submarine recycling 30 November 2009.

Thresher/Permit class

3 of 14 total in class

Name	Hull number	Type	Commissioned	Status
Flasher	SSN-613	nuclear-electric	22 July 1966	Disposed of by submarine recycling 11 May 1994.
Greenling	SSN-614	nuclear-electric	3 November 1967	Disposed of by submarine recycling 30 September 1994.
Gato	SSN-615	nuclear-electric	25 January 1968	Disposed of by submarine recycling.

Tullibee class

Unique submarine

Name	Hull number	Type	Commissioned	Status
Tullibee	SSN-597	nuclear-electric	9 November 1960	Entered submarine recycling 5 January 1995

George Washington class

2 of 5 total in class

Name	Hull number	Type	Commissioned	Status
George Washington	SSBN-598	nuclear-electric	30 December 1959	Disposed of through submarine recycling, 1998
Patrick Henry	SSBN-599	nuclear-electric	11 April 1960	Disposed of through submarine recycling, 1997

Ethan Allen class

2 of 5 total in class

Name	Hull number	Type	Commissioned	Status
Ethan Allen	SSBN-608	nuclear-electric	8 August 1961	Disposed of through submarine recycling, 1999
Thomas A. Edison	SSBN-610	nuclear-electric	10 March 1962	Disposed of through submarine recycling, 1997

Lafayette class

4 of 9 total in class

Name	Hull number	Type	Commissioned	Status
Lafayette	SSBN-616	nuclear-electric	23 April 1963	Disposed of by submarine recycling 25 February 1992.
Alexander Hamilton	SSBN-617	nuclear-electric	27 June 1963	Disposed of by submarine recycling 28 February 1994.
Nathan Hale	SSBN-623	nuclear-electric	12 November 1963	Disposed of by submarine recycling 5 April 1994.
Daniel Webster	SSBN-626	nuclear-electric	9 April 1964	Became moored training ship MTS-626.

James Madison class

3 of 10 total in class

Name	Hull number	Type	Commissioned	Status
Tecumseh	SSBN-628	nuclear-electric	29 May 1964	Disposed of by submarine recycling 1 April 1994.
Ulysses S. Grant	SSBN-631	nuclear-electric	17 July 1964	Disposed of by submarine recycling 23 October 1993.
Casimir Pulaski	SSBN-633	nuclear-electric	14 August 1964	Disposed of by submarine recycling 21 October 1994.

Sturgeon class

11 of 37 total in class

Name	Hull number	Type	Commissioned	Status
Sturgeon	SSN-637	nuclear-electric	3 March 1967	Disposed of by submarine recycling 11 December 1995.
Pargo	SSN-650	nuclear-electric	5 January 1968	Disposed of by submarine recycling 15 October 1996.
Bergall	SSN-667	nuclear-electric	13 June 1969	Disposed of by submarine recycling 29 September 1997.
Seahorse	SSN-669	nuclear-electric	19 September 1969	Disposed of by submarine recycling 30 September 1996.
Flying Fish	SSN-673	nuclear-electric	29 April 1970	Disposed of by submarine recycling 16 October 1996.
Trepang	SSN-674	nuclear-electric	14 August 1970	Disposed of by submarine recycling 17 April 2000.
Bluefish	SSN-675	nuclear-electric	8 January 1971	Disposed of by submarine recycling 1 November 2003.
Billfish	SSN-676	nuclear-electric	12 March 1971	Disposed of by submarine recycling 26 April 2000.
Archerfish	SSN-678	nuclear-electric	17 December 1971	Disposed of by submarine recycling 6 November 1998.
Silversides	SSN-679	nuclear-electric	5 May 1972	Disposed of by submarine recycling 1 October 2001.
Batfish	SSN-681	nuclear-electric	1 September 1972	Disposed of by submarine recycling 22 November 2002.

Benjamin Franklin class

6 of 12 total in class

Name	Hull number	Type	Commissioned	Status
Benjamin Franklin	SSBN-640	nuclear-electric	22 October 1965	Decommissioned 23 November 1993. Disposed of through Ship-Submarine Recycling Program, 1995
George Bancroft	SSBN-643	nuclear-electric	22 January 1966	Decommissioned 21 September 1993. Disposed of through Ship-Submarine Recycling Program, 1998
James K. Polk	SSBN-645	nuclear-electric	16 April 1966	Decommissioned 8 July 1999. Disposed of through Ship-Submarine Recycling Program, 2000
Henry L. Stimson	SSBN-655	nuclear-electric	20 August 1966	Decommissioned 5 May 1993. Disposed of through Ship-Submarine Recycling Program, 1994
Francis Scott Key	SSBN-657	nuclear-electric	3 December 1966	Decommissioned 2 September 1993. Disposed of through Ship-Submarine Recycling Program, 1995
Will Rogers	SSBN-659	nuclear-electric	1 April 1967	Decommissioned 12 April 1993. Disposed of through Ship-Submarine Recycling Program, 1994

Narwhal class

Unique submarine

Name	Hull number	Type	Commissioned	Status
Narwhal	SSN-671	nuclear-electric	12 July 1969	Disposed of by submarine recycling October 2020

Glenard P. Lipscomb class

Unique submarine

Name	Hull number	Type	Commissioned	Status
Glenard P. Lipscomb	SSN-685	nuclear-electric	21 December 1974	Entered Ship-Submarine Recycling Program 1997.

Los Angeles class

33 of 62 total in class

Name	Hull number	Type	Commissioned	Status
Philadelphia	SSN-690	nuclear-electric	25 June 1977	Stricken, to be disposed of by submarine recycling.
Omaha	SSN-692	nuclear-electric	11 March 1978	Disposed of by submarine recycling.
Groton	SSN-694	nuclear-electric	8 July 1978	Disposed of by submarine recycling.
New York City	SSN-696	nuclear-electric	3 March 1979	Stricken, to be disposed of by submarine recycling.
Indianapolis	SSN-697	nuclear-electric	5 January 1980	Stricken, to be disposed of by submarine recycling.
Bremerton	SSN-698	nuclear-electric	28 March 1981	Decommissioned in 2021.
Jacksonville	SSN-699	nuclear-electric	16 May 1981	Decommissioned in 2021.
Dallas	SSN-700	nuclear-electric	18 July 1981	Stricken, to be disposed of by submarine recycling.
La Jolla	SSN-701	nuclear-electric	24 October 1981	Conversion to moored training ship (MTS-701) commenced in 2015, completed in 2019.
Phoenix	SSN-702	nuclear-electric	19 December 1981	Disposed of by submarine recycling.
Boston	SSN-703	nuclear-electric	30 January 1982	Disposed of by submarine recycling.
Baltimore	SSN-704	nuclear-electric	24 July 1982	Stricken, to be disposed of by submarine recycling.
City of Corpus Christi	SSN-705	nuclear-electric	8 January 1983	Stricken, undergoing nuclear deactivation
Albuquerque	SSN-706	nuclear-electric	21 May 1983	Stricken, to be disposed of by submarine recycling.
Portsmouth	SSN-707	nuclear-electric	1 October 1983	Stricken, to be disposed of by submarine recycling.
Minneapolis-Saint Paul	SSN-708	nuclear-electric	10 March 1984	Stricken, to be disposed of by submarine recycling.
Hyman G. Rickover	SSN-709	nuclear-electric	21 July 1984	Stricken, to be disposed of by submarine recycling.
Augusta	SSN-710	nuclear-electric	19 January 1985	Stricken, to be disposed of by submarine recycling.
Providence	SSN-719	nuclear-electric	27 July 1985	Decommissioned in 2021.
Pittsburgh	SSN-720	nuclear-electric	23 November 1985	Decommissioned in 2020.
Louisville	SSN-724	nuclear-electric	8 November 1986	Decommissioned in 2021.
Helena	SSN-725	nuclear-electric	11 July 1987	Active in service.
San Juan	SSN-751	nuclear-electric	6 August 1988	Active in service.
Pasadena	SSN-752	nuclear-electric	11 February 1989	Active in service.
Topeka	SSN-754	nuclear-electric	21 October 1989	Active in service.
Miami	SSN-755	nuclear-electric	30 June 1990	Stricken, to be disposed of by submarine recycling.
Alexandria	SSN-757	nuclear-electric	29 June 1991	Active in service.
Annapolis	SSN-760	nuclear-electric	11 April 1992	Active in service.
Springfield	SSN-761	nuclear-electric	9 January 1993	Active in service.
Columbus	SSN-762	nuclear-electric	24 July 1993	Active in service.
Santa Fe	SSN-763	nuclear-electric	8 January 1994	Active in service.
Hartford	SSN-768	nuclear-electric	10 December 1994	Active in service.
Columbia	SSN-771	nuclear-electric	9 October 1995	Active in service.

Ohio class

18 of 18 total in class

Name	Hull number	Type	Commissioned	Status
Ohio	SSGN-726	nuclear-electric	11 November 1981	In service, converted to a guided missile submarine.
Michigan	SSGN-727	nuclear-electric	11 September 1982	In service, converted to a guided missile submarine
Florida	SSGN-728	nuclear-electric	18 June 1983	In service, converted to a guided missile submarine
Georgia	SSGN-729	nuclear-electric	11 February 1984	In service, converted to a guided missile submarine
Henry M. Jackson	SSBN-730	nuclear-electric	16 October 1984	Active in service.
Alabama	SSBN-731	nuclear-electric	25 May 1985	Active in service.
Alaska	SSBN-732	nuclear-electric	25 January 1986	Active in service.
Nevada	SSBN-733	nuclear-electric	16 August 1986	Active in service.
Tennessee	SSBN-734	nuclear-electric	17 December 1988	Active in service.
Pennsylvania	SSBN-735	nuclear-electric	9 September 1989	Active in service.
West Virginia	SSBN-736	nuclear-electric	20 October 1990	Active in service.
Kentucky	SSBN-737	nuclear-electric	13 July 1991	Active in service.
Maryland	SSBN-738	nuclear-electric	13 June 1992	Active in service.
Nebraska	SSBN-739	nuclear-electric	10 July 1993	Active in service.
Rhode Island	SSBN-740	nuclear-electric	9 July 1994	Active in service.
Maine	SSBN-741	nuclear-electric	29 July 1995	Active in service.
Wyoming	SSBN-742	nuclear-electric	13 July 1996	Active in service.
Louisiana	SSBN-743	nuclear-electric	6 September 1997	Active in service.

Seawolf class

3 of 3 total in class

Name	Hull number	Type	Commissioned	Status
Seawolf	SSN-21	nuclear-electric	19 July 1997	Active in service.
Connecticut	SSN-22	nuclear-electric	11 December 1998	Active in service.
Jimmy Carter	SSN-23	nuclear-electric	19 February 2005	Active in service.

Virginia class

Name	Hull number	Type	Commissioned	Status
Virginia	SSN-774	nuclear-electric	23 October 2004	Active in service.
Hawaii	SSN-776	nuclear-electric	5 May 2007	Active in service.
New Hampshire	SSN-778	nuclear-electric	25 October 2008	Active in service.
Missouri	SSN-780	nuclear-electric	31 July 2010	Active in service.
Mississippi	SSN-782	nuclear-electric	2 June 2012	Active in service.
North Dakota	SSN-784	nuclear-electric	25 October 2014	Active in service.
Illinois	SSN-786	nuclear-electric	29 October 2016	Active in service.
Colorado	SSN-788	nuclear-electric	17 March 2018	Active in service.
South Dakota	SSN-790	nuclear-electric	2 February 2019	Active in service.
Vermont	SSN-792	nuclear-electric	18 April 2020	Active in service.
Oregon	SSN-793	nuclear-electric	28 May 2022	Active in service.
Hyman G. Rickover	SSN-795	nuclear-electric	14 October 2023	Active in service
Iowa	SSN-797	nuclear-electric	5 April 2025	Active in service.
Idaho	SSN-799	nuclear-electric	TBD	Under construction
Utah	SSN-801	nuclear-electric	TBD	Under construction
Oklahoma	SSN-802	nuclear-electric	TBD	Under construction
Arizona	SSN-803	nuclear-electric	TBD	Under construction
Tang	SSN-805	nuclear-electric	TBD	Under construction

Columbia class

Name	Hull number	Type	Commissioned	Status
District of Columbia	SSBN-826	nuclear-electric	TBD	Under construction
Wisconsin	SSBN-827	nuclear-electric	TBD	On order

== See also ==
- Electric Launch Company (Elco) – former subsidiary which manufactured electric yachts, and PT boats during World War II
- Electro-Dynamic Company – former subsidiary of Electric Boat which manufactured electric motors and generators
- Submarine Boat Company – former subsidiary of Electric Boat which ran a shipyard during WWI producing steel cargo vessels, and slightly beyond
