= USS Francis Scott Key =

Submarine of the United States

USS Francis Scott Key (SSBN-657)
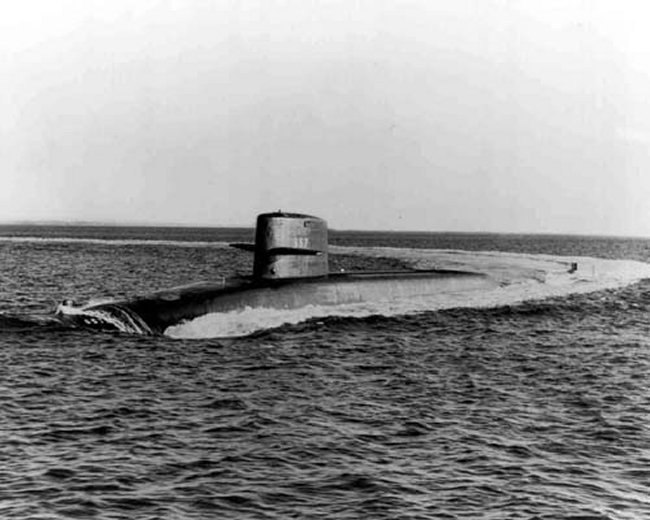
- USS Francis Scott Key (SSBN-657) commencing a hard turn to starboard, possibly during her sea trials off the United States East Coast sometime before December 1966.

History

United States
- Namesake: Francis Scott Key (1779–1843), author of the words to the United States' national anthem, "The Star-Spangled Banner"
- Ordered: 29 July 1963
- Builder: General Dynamics Electric Boat, Groton, Connecticut
- Laid down: 5 December 1964
- Launched: 23 April 1965
- Sponsored by: Mrs. Marjory Key Thorne and Mrs. William T. Jarvis
- Commissioned: 3 December 1966
- Decommissioned: 2 September 1993
- Stricken: 2 September 1993
- Fate: Scrapping via Ship and Submarine Recycling Program completed 1 September 1995

General characteristics
- Class & type: Benjamin Franklin-class fleet ballistic missile submarine
- Displacement: 7,300 long tons (7,417 t) surfaced; 8,250 long tons (8,382 t) submerged
- Length: 425 ft (130 m)
- Beam: 33 ft (10 m)
- Draft: 31 ft (9.4 m)
- Installed power: 15,000 shp (11,185 kW)
- Propulsion: One S5W pressurized-water nuclear reactor, two geared steam turbines, one shaft
- Speed: Over 20 knots
- Test depth: 1,300 feet (400 m)
- Complement: Two crews (Blue Crew and Gold Crew) of 120 men each
- Armament: 16 × ballistic missile tubes; 4 × 21 in (533 mm) torpedo tubes (all forward)

USS Francis Scott Key (SSBN-657), a Benjamin Franklin-class ballistic missile submarine, was the only submarine of the United States Navy to be named for Francis Scott Key (1779–1843), an American lawyer, author, and amateur poet who wrote the poem "The Defense of Fort McHenry", which became the words to the United States' national anthem, "The Star-Spangled Banner". During World War II there was a liberty ship named SS Francis Scott Key.

== Construction and commissioning ==
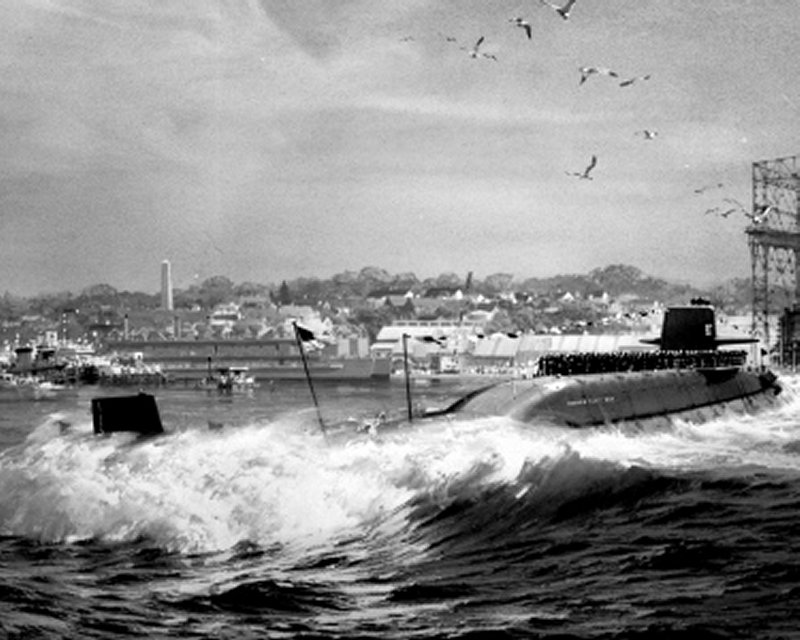
Francis Scott Key is waterborne for the first time at the end of the launching ways at the Electric Boat Division of General Dynamics Corporation at Groton, Connecticut, during her launching on 23 April 1965.

The contract to build Francis Scott Key was awarded to the Electric Boat Division of General Dynamics Corporation in Groton, Connecticut on 29 July 1963 and her keel was laid down there on 5 December 1964. She was launched on 23 April 1965, sponsored by Mrs. Marjory Key Thorne and Mrs. William T. Jarvis, both direct descendants of Key, and commissioned on 3 December 1966, with Captain Frank W. Graham in command of the Blue Crew and Lieutenant Commander Joseph B. Logan in command of the Gold Crew.

== Service history ==
The Francis Scott Key was part of Submarine Squadron (SUBRON) 16 based in Rota, Spain. The squadron and submarines moved to Kings Bay, Georgia in 1979.

The Key conducted the first submerged launch of a Trident missile in 1979. She also became the first submarine to go on deterrent patrol with Trident I missiles.

The Gold crew performed the submarine's last SSBN deterrent patrol, Patrol #72, in 1992. The Key combined crews and changed homeport from Charleston, SC to Pearl Harbor, HI in late 1992.

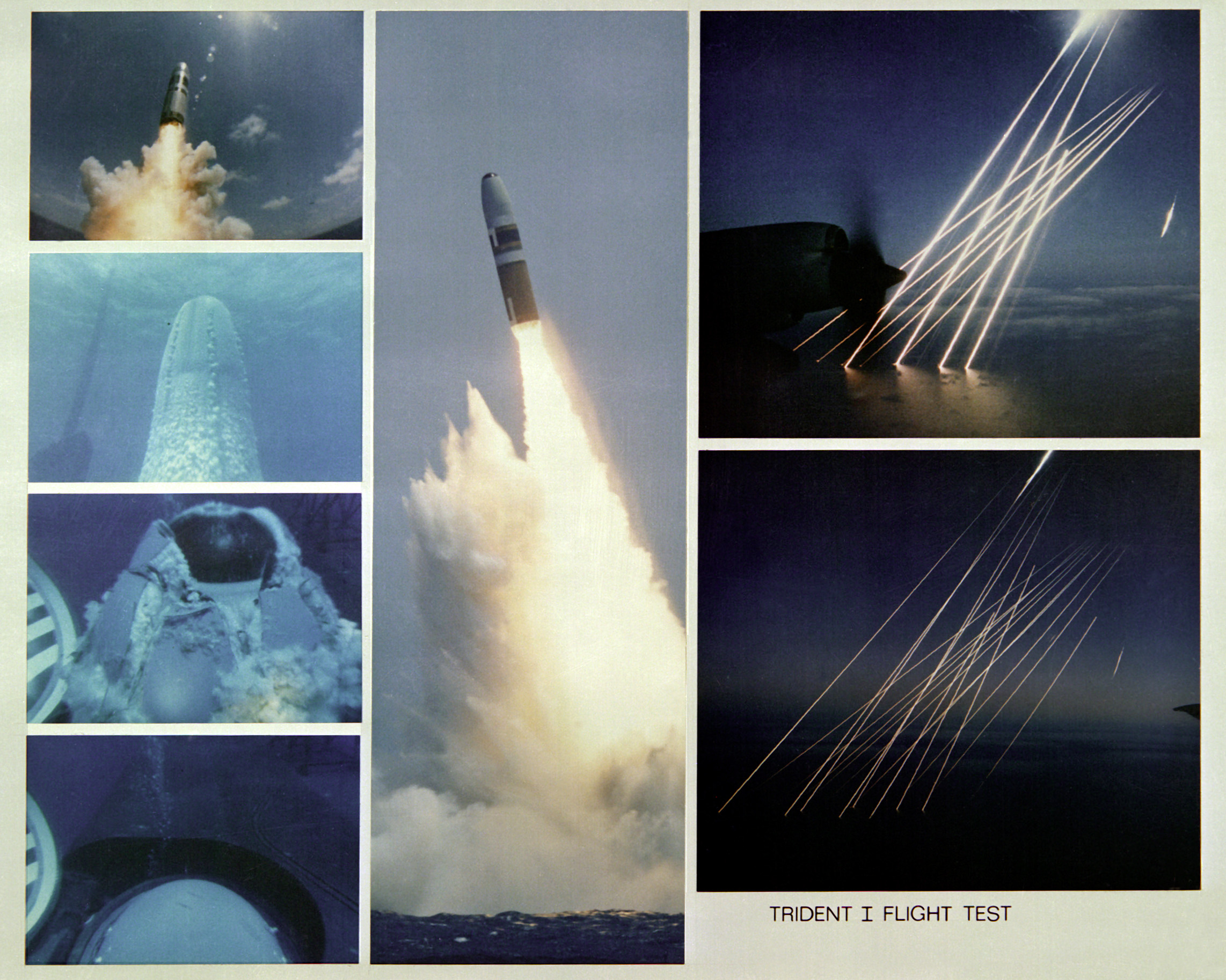
A montage of a Trident I (C4) missile and its reentry vehicles launched from Francis Scott Key

== Decommissioning and disposal ==
Francis Scott Key was decommissioned on 2 September 1993 with Commander Carl D. Olson in command, and stricken from the Naval Vessel Register the same day. Her scrapping via the U.S. Navy's Nuclear-Powered Ship and Submarine Recycling Program at Bremerton, Washington, was completed on 1 September 1995.
