= Sail (submarine) =

Vertical structure on dorsal surface of a submarine

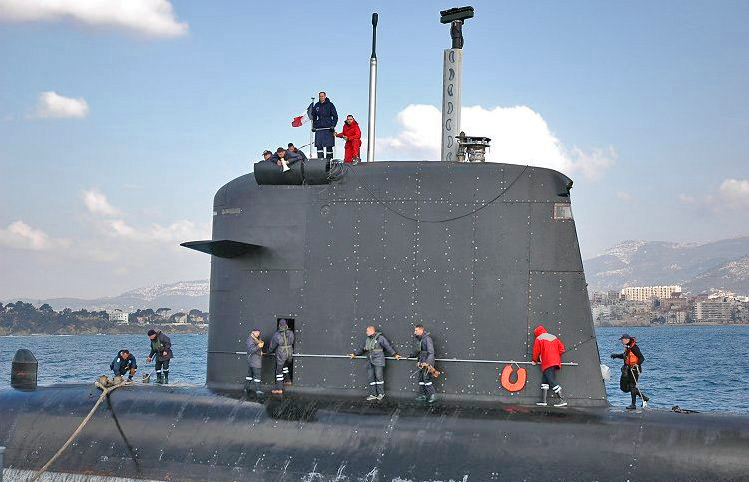
Sail of the French nuclear submarine Casabianca showing the diving planes, camouflaged masts, periscope, electronic warfare masts, door and windows.

In naval parlance, the sail (American usage) or fin (British/Commonwealth usage) (also known as a fairwater) of a submarine is the tower-like structure found on the dorsal (topside) surface of submarines. Submarine sails once housed the conning tower (command and communications data center), and continue to house the periscope(s), radar and communications masts (antenna). When above the water's surface, the sail serves as an observation platform. It also provides an entrance and exit point on the submarine that has enough freeboard to prevent the submarine being swamped. In modern submarines the sail is not itself a pressure vessel and therefore floods with water when submerging. Under water, the sail acts as a vertical stabilizer. In some submarines, the sail also supports diving planes (or fairwater planes), which are control surfaces used for depth control while underwater.

== See also ==
- Dorsal fin
