= List of ship launches in 1962 =

The list of ship launches in 1962 includes a chronological list of all ships launched in 1962.

| | Ship | Class / type | Builder | Location | Country | Notes |
|---|---|---|---|---|---|---|
| 9 January | British Cygnet | Tanker | Harland & Wolff | Belfast | United Kingdom | For British Tanker Company. |
| 15 January | Halsey | Leahy-class cruiser | San Francisco Naval Shipyard | San Francisco, California | United States | |
| 16 January | City of Vancouver | V-class ferry | Burrad Dry Dock Co. Ltd. | North Vancouver | Canada | For BC Ferries |
| 25 January | U 2 | Type 201 submarine | HDW | Kiel | West Germany | For German Navy |
| 27 January | Hiev | Crane vessel | Rheinwerft Walsum | Walsum | West Germany | For German Navy |
| 2 February | Hansa Express | Ferry | Hanseatiche Werft | Hamburg | West Germany | Originally ordered by Rederi Ab Vikinglinjen as Viking II. Contract sold to Finnlines due to bankruptcy of the shipyard. |
| 3 February | Braunschweig | Köln-class (Type 140) frigate | | | West Germany | For German Navy |
| 4 February | Julle | | Adler Werft GmbH | Bremen | West Germany | For Juelsminde-Kalundborg Linien |
| 6 February | Richard E. Byrd | Charles F. Adams-class destroyer | Todd Pacific Shipyards | Seattle, Washington | United States | For United States Navy |
| 6 February | Pidder Lyng | ferry | Kröger Werft | Schacht-Audort | West Germany | For Wyker Dampfschiffs-Reederei Amrum GmbH. |
| 22 February | Barb | Permit-class submarine | Ingalls Shipbuilding | Pascagoula, Mississippi | United States | For United States Navy |
| 24 February | Thomas Jefferson | Ethan Allen-class submarine | Newport News Shipbuilding | Newport News, Virginia | United States | For United States Navy |
| 6 March | England | Leahy-class cruiser | Todd Pacific Shipyards | San Pedro, California | United States | For United States Navy |
| 17 March | Raleigh | Raleigh-class amphibious transport dock | New York Naval Shipyard | Brooklyn, New York | United States | For United States Navy |
| 17 March | Pollack | Permit-class submarine | New York Shipbuilding | Camden, New Jersey | United States | For United States Navy |
| 31 March | Bronstein | Bronstein-class frigate | Avondale Shipyard | Avondale, Louisiana | United States | For United States Navy |
| 5 April | Mohawk | Tribal-class frigate | Vickers-Armstrongs | Barrow-in-Furness, England | United Kingdom | For Royal Navy |
| 5 April | Regent Liverpool | Tanker | Harland & Wolff | Belfast | United Kingdom | For Texaco Oil Co. |
| 8 April | Lofoten | Fishing trawler | Brooke Marine Ltd. | Lowestoft | United Kingdom | For Lindsey Steam Fishing Co. Ltd. |
| 2 May | Qu'Appelle | Mackenzie-class destroyer | Davie Shipbuilding | Lauzon, Quebec | Canada | For Canadian Navy |
| 4 May | Port Nicholson | Refrigerated cargo ship | Harland & Wolff | Belfast | United Kingdom | For Port Line. |
| 5 May | Griep | Crane vessel | Rheinwerft Walsum | Walsum | West Germany | For German Navy |
| 5 May | Loveden | Fishing trawler | Brooke Marine Ltd. | Lowestoft | United Kingdom | For Lindsey Steam Fishing Co. Ltd. |
| 7 May | U 3 | Type 201 submarine | HDW | Kiel | West Germany | For German Navy |
| 8 May | Lafayette | Lafayette-class submarine | Electric Boat | Groton, Connecticut | United States | For United States Navy |
| 12 May | Reeves | Leahy-class cruiser | Puget Sound Naval Shipyard | Bremerton, Washington | United States | For United States Navy |
| 17 May | Aigburth | Dredger | Harland & Wolff | Belfast | United Kingdom | For British Transport Commission. |
| 18 May | Chapel River | Bulk carrier | Blyth Dry Docks & Shipbuilding Co. Ltd | Blyth, Northumberland | United Kingdom | For River Line Ltd. |
| 18 May | Conyngham | Charles F. Adams-class destroyer | New York Shipbuilding | Camden, New Jersey | United States | For United States Navy |
| 31 May | Ringwood | Cargo ship | Harland & Wolff | Belfast | United Kingdom | For Ringals Rederi A/S. |
| 2 June | Worden | Leahy-class cruiser | Bath Iron Works | Bath, Maine | United States | For United States Navy |
| 9 June | McCloy | Bronstein-class frigate | Avondale Shipyard | Avondale, Louisiana | United States | For United States Navy |
| 19 June | Eurydice | Daphné-class submarine | Direction des Constructions et Armes Navales | Cherbourg | France | For French Navy |
| 28 June | Dale | Leahy-class cruiser | New York Shipbuilding | Camden, New Jersey | United States | For United States Navy |
| 3 July | Zulu | Tribal-class frigate | Alexander Stephen and Sons | Glasgow, Scotland | United Kingdom | For Royal Navy |
| 18 July | Cochrane | Charles F. Adams-class destroyer | Lockheed Shipbuilding | Seattle, Washington | United States | For United States Navy |
| 18 July | Admiral Golovko | Project 58 Groznyy-class cruiser | A.A. Zhdanov | Leningrad | Soviet Union | For Soviet Navy |
| 19 July | Rashidah | Buoy tender | J. Bolson & Son Ltd. | Poole | United Kingdom | For Abu Dhabi Marine Areas Ltd. |
| 30 July | Kalle | | Adler Werft GmbH | Bremen | West Germany | For Juelsminde-Kalundborg Linien |
| 4 August | James Monroe | Lafayette-class submarine | Newport News Shipbuilding | Newport News, Virginia | United States | For United States Navy |
| 14 August | Bayern | Hamburg-class destroyer | H. C. Stülcken Sohn | Hamburg | West Germany | For German Navy |
| 16 August | Ajax | Leander-class frigate | Cammell Laird | Birkenhead, England | United Kingdom | For Royal Navy |
| 17 August | Penelope | Leander-class frigate | Vickers-Armstrongs | Newcastle-upon-Tyne, England | United Kingdom | For Royal Navy |
| 18 August | Alexander Hamilton | Lafayette-class submarine | Electric Boat | Groton, Connecticut | United States | For United States Navy |
| 18 August | Dace | Permit-class submarine | Ingalls Shipbuilding | Pascagoula, Mississippi | United States | For United States Navy |
| 18 August | Haddo | Permit-class submarine | New York Shipbuilding | Camden, New Jersey | United States | For United States Navy |
| 18 August | Welsh Consort | Fishing trawler | Atlantic Shipbuilding Co. Ltd | Newport | United Kingdom | For Welsh Fisheries Ltd. |
| 18 August | Welsh Monarch | Fishing trawler | Atlantic Shipbuilding Co. Ltd | Newport | United Kingdom | For Welsh Fisheries Ltd. |
| 25 August | U 4 | Type 205 submarine | HDW | Kiel | West Germany | For German Navy |
| 3 September | Ark Al-Faruque | Ferry | Brooke Marine Ltd. | Lowestoft | United Kingdom | For Ark Navigation Co. of Pakistan Ltd. |
| 15 September | Andrew Jackson | Lafayette-class submarine | Mare Island Naval Shipyard | Vallejo, California | United States | For United States Navy |
| 15 September | Vancouver | Raleigh-class amphibious transport dock | New York Naval Shipyard | Brooklyn, New York | United States | For United States Navy |
| 16 September | Michelangelo | Ocean liner | Ansaldo Shipyards | Genoa | Italy | For Italian Line |
| 18 September | Natsushio | Natsushio-class submarine | | | Japan | For Japan Maritime Self-Defense Force |
| 26 September | Belisland | Cargo ship | Harland & Wolff | Belfast | United Kingdom | For Belships Co. |
| 28 September | British Lancer | Tanker | Harland & Wolff | Belfast | United Kingdom | For British Tanker Company. |
| 17 October | HMS Otus | Oberon-class submarine | Scotts Shipbuilding and Engineering Company | Greenock | United Kingdom | For Royal Navy |
| 8 November | John Williams VII | Cargo liner | Brooke Marine Ltd. | Lowestoft | United Kingdom | For private owner. |
| 20 November | U 5 | Type 205 submarine | HDW | Kiel | West Germany | For German Navy |
| 28 November | Aurora | Leander-class frigate | John Brown & Company | Clydebank, Scotland | United Kingdom | For Royal Navy |
| 28 November | Queen of Saanich | V-class ferry | Victoria Machinery Co. Depot Ltd | Victoria | Canada | For BC Ferries |
| 30 November | Henry Clay | Lafayette-class submarine | Newport News Shipbuilding | Newport News, Virginia | United States | For United States Navy |
| 14 December | Fuyushio | Natsushio-class submarine | | | Japan | For Japan Maritime Self-Defense Force |
| Unknown date | B.H.C. Motor Ferry No. 6 | Ferry | Blyth Dry Docks & Shipbuilding Co. Ltd | Blyth, Northumberland | United Kingdom | For Blyth Harbour Commissioners. |
| Unknown date | Buffalo | coaster | Ardrossan Dockyard Ltd. | Ardrossan | United Kingdom | For Coast Lines. |
| Unknown date | Vauban | Coaster | Brazen Island Shipyard Ltd. | Polruan | United Kingdom | For Lockett Wilson Line Ltd. |
