= Japanese ship Natsushio =

At least three Japanese warships have been named Natsushio:

- Japanese destroyer Natsushio, a Kagerō-class destroyer launched in 1939 and sunk in 1942.
- JDS Natsushio (SS-523), a Natsushio-class submarine launched in 1962 and struck in 1978.
- JDS Natsushio (SS-584), a Harushio-class submarine launched in 1990 and struck in 2010.
