= Japanese submarine Fuyushio =

At least two warships of Japan have been named Fuyushio:

- JDS Fuyushio (SS-524), a Natsushio-class submarine launched in 1962 and struck in 1980.
- JDS Fuyushio (SS-588), a Harushio-class submarine launched in 1994 and struck in 2015.
