= USS John Adams (SSBN-620) =

Submarine of the United States

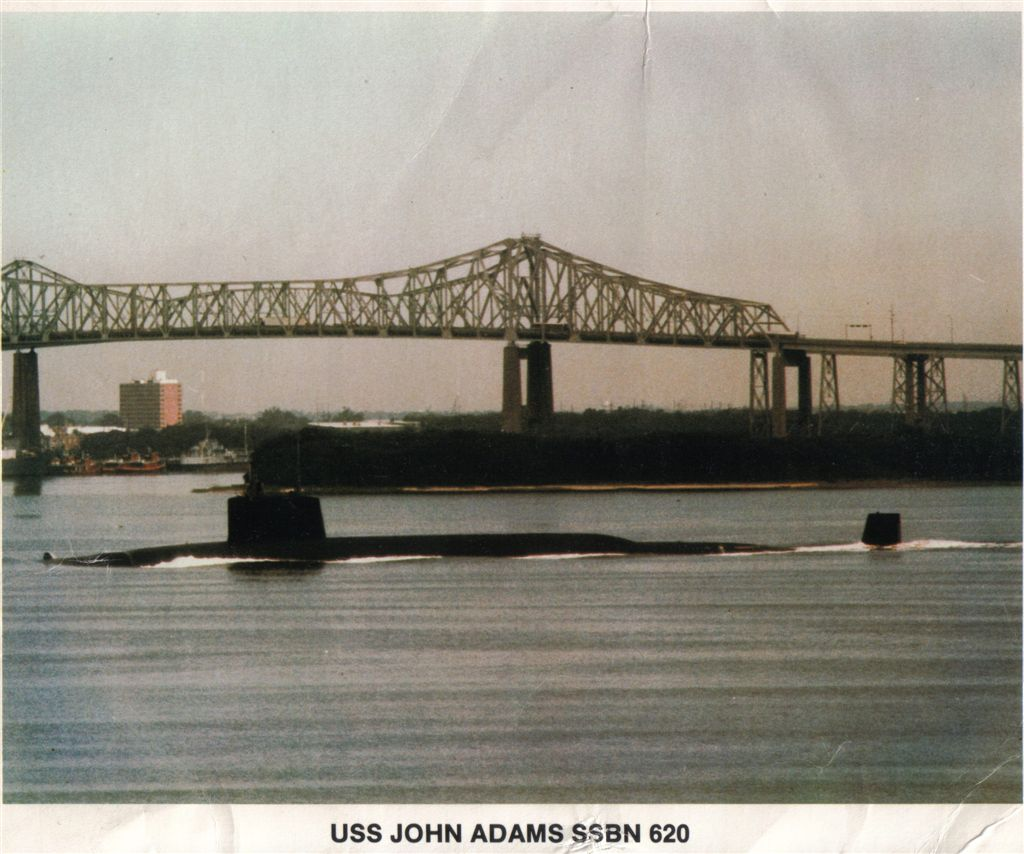
- USS John Adams in April 1964

History

United States
- Name: USS John Adams
- Namesake: John Adams (1735–1826), second President of the United States (1797–1801), and John Quincy Adams (1767–1848), sixth President of the United States (1825–1829)
- Ordered: 23 July 1960
- Builder: Portsmouth Naval Shipyard, Kittery, Maine
- Laid down: 19 May 1961
- Launched: 12 January 1963
- Commissioned: 12 May 1964
- Decommissioned: 24 March 1989
- Stricken: 24 March 1989
- Fate: Scrapping via Ship-Submarine Recycling Program completed 12 February 1996

General characteristics
- Class & type: Lafayette-class submarine
- Type: Ballistic missile submarine (hull design SCB-216)
- Displacement: 7,250 long tons (7,366 t) surfaced; 8,250 long tons (8,382 t) submerged
- Length: 425 ft (130 m)
- Beam: 33 ft (10 m)
- Draft: 31 ft 6 in (9.60 m)
- Propulsion: 1 × S5W reactor; 2 × General Electric geared turbines=15,000 shp (11,000 kW)
- Speed: 20 knots (37 km/h) surfaced; 25 knots (46 km/h) submerged
- Complement: Two crews (Blue and Gold), 13 officers and 130 enlisted men each
- Sensors & processing systems: BQS-4 sonar
- Armament: 4 × 21 in (530 mm) Mark 65 torpedo tubes with Mark 113 firecontrol system, for Mark 48 torpedoes; 16 × vertical tubes for Polaris or Poseidon ballistic missiles

USS John Adams (SSBN-620), a Lafayette-class ballistic missile submarine, was the second ship of the United States Navy to be named for Founding Father John Adams (1735–1826), the second President of the United States (1797–1801), and his son John Quincy Adams (1767–1848), the sixth President of the United States (1825–1829). Both names were used with the captains of the Blue and Gold crews alternately using the names John Adams and John Quincy Adams.

== Construction and commissioning ==
The contract to build John Adams was awarded to Portsmouth Naval Shipyard in Kittery, Maine, on 23 July 1960 and her keel was laid down there on 19 May 1961. She was launched on 12 January 1963 sponsored by Abigail Adams Manny, great, great, great-granddaughter of John Quincy Adams, and wife of James C. Manny, and commissioned on 12 May 1964, with Commander Lando W. Zech, Jr. in command of the Blue Crew and Commander Paul J. Early in command of the Gold Crew.

== Operational history ==
Following her commissioning, John Adams completed sixteen deterrent patrols while assigned to the United States Atlantic Fleet After her sixteenth patrol, she entered Puget Sound Naval Shipyard in Bremerton, Washington for overhaul and modernization in August 1968. She completed overhaul on 10 August 1969 and returned to sea as a unit of the United States Pacific Fleet. Both the Blue Crew and the Gold Crew shot two Polaris ballistic missiles during a Demonstration and Shakedown Operation (DASO) following the overhaul. She conducted sixteen more deterrent patrols as a unit of the Pacific Fleet.

Upon completion of her thirty-second deterrent patrol, John Adams entered Portsmouth Naval Shipyard at Kittery for her second overhaul and conversion to the Poseidon missile system. She completed the overhaul and returned to sea once again as a unit of the Atlantic Fleet.

After completing an additional forty-three deterrent patrols from both her home port at Charleston, South Carolina, and from Holy Loch, Scotland, John Adams transited the Panama Canal to again enter the Puget Sound Navy Shipyard, this time in preparation for decommissioning after a long and distinguished career. At the time of her decommissioning she had completed 75 strategic deterrent patrols.

== Decommissioning and disposal ==
John Adams was decommissioned on 24 March 1989 and stricken from the Naval Vessel Register the same day. She entered the Nuclear-Powered Ship and Submarine Recycling Program at Bremerton, Washington. Recycling of Ex-John Adams was completed on 12 February 1996.
