= USS Nathan Hale =

Submarine of the United States

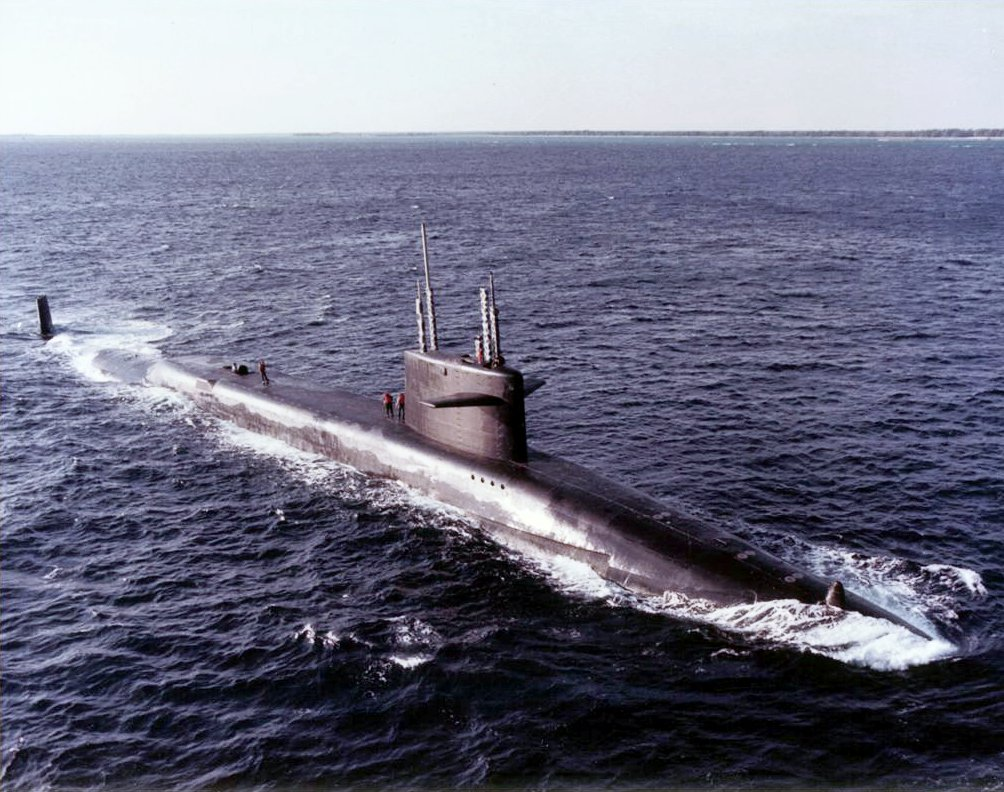
- USS Nathan Hale (SSBN-623), at the AUTEC test range in 1981, Andros Island, Bahamas.

History

United States
- Name: USS Nathan Hale
- Namesake: Nathan Hale (1755–1776), a hero of the American Revolutionary War
- Ordered: 3 February 1961
- Awarded: 3 February 1961
- Builder: General Dynamics Electric Boat
- Laid down: 2 October 1961
- Launched: 12 January 1963
- Sponsored by: Mrs. George Whelan Anderson, Jr.
- Commissioned: 23 November 1963
- Decommissioned: 31 January 1986
- Stricken: 31 January 1986
- Fate: Entered Ship-Submarine Recycling Program 2 October 1991; recycling completed 5 April 1994

General characteristics
- Class & type: Lafayette-class submarine
- Type: Ballistic missile submarine (hull design SCB-216)
- Displacement: Surfaced: approx. 7,250 tons; Submerged: approx. 8,250 tons
- Length: 425 feet (130 meters)
- Beam: 33 feet (10 meters)
- Draft: 31.5 feet (9.6 meters)
- Propulsion: 1 × S5W reactor; 2 × DeLaval turbine=15,000 shp (11,000 kW)
- Speed: Surfaced: 16 – 20 knots; Submerged: 22 – 25 knots
- Complement: Two crews (Blue Crew and Gold), 13 officers and 130 enlisted men each
- Sensors & processing systems: BQS-4 sonar
- Armament: 4 × 21 in (530 mm) Mark 65 torpedo tubes with Mark 113 firecontrol system, for Mark 48 torpedoes; 16 × vertical tubes for Polaris or Poseidon ballistic missiles

USS Nathan Hale (SSBN-623) was the sixth Lafayette class nuclear-powered fleet ballistic missile submarine produced. She was named for Captain Nathan Hale (1755–1776), a Connecticut schoolteacher who served in the Continental Army and known most famously for giving his life as a spy during the American Revolutionary War.

== Construction and commissioning ==
The contract for Nathan Hale's construction was awarded on 3 February 1961. Construction began on 2 October 1961 by the Electric Boat Division of General Dynamics in Groton, Connecticut. She was launched on 12 January 1963, sponsored by Mary Lee Lamar Anderson, the wife of the Chief of Naval Operations, Admiral George Whelan Anderson, Jr., and commissioned on 23 November 1963 in a subdued ceremony due to the assassination of President John F. Kennedy the day before.

== Operational history ==
Nathan Hale entered service on 21 May 1964 with her home port at Charleston, South Carolina, and performed deterrent patrols as a member of the United States Atlantic Fleet. She was originally outfitted with the Polaris missile system and in the 1970s underwent conversion to the Poseidon missile system. In the period 1967-68 she underwent overhaul and refueling, and was subsequently transferred to the Pacific Fleet, home ported in Pearl Harbor, Hawaii, and operating out of Agana, Guam. By April 1986 she had completed 69 deterrent patrols in the Atlantic and Pacific.

== Decommissioning and disposal ==
Nathan Hale was decommissioned on 3 November 1986 and stricken from the Naval Vessel Register on 31 January 1987. Ex-Nathan Hale entered the Navy's Nuclear-Powered Ship-Submarine Recycling Program at Bremerton, Washington on 2 October 1991. Recycling of Ex-Nathan Hale was completed on 5 April 1994.

== In fiction ==
Nathan Hale's hull number, "623", was used on the submarine portraying the fictional U.S. Navy nuclear submarine USS Sawfish in the 1959 film On the Beach. However, the U.S. Navy did not cooperate in the making of On the Beach, and the submarine portraying USS Sawfish was in reality the British Royal Navy diesel-electric submarine HMS Andrew (P423), which bore no connection to USS Nathan Hale.

Nathan Hale was the name of the U.S. Navy nuclear submarine in the 1967 novel "Pre-Empt" by John R. Vorhies. Pub Date: 23 Oct. 1967, Publisher: Regnery. The novel involved a U.S. Navy nuclear missile submarine commander who goes rogue and threatens to launch his submarine's missiles unless all the world's nuclear powers surrender their nuclear weapons to an international body.
