= USS Woodrow Wilson =

Submarine of the United States

USS Woodrow Wilson (SSBN-624)
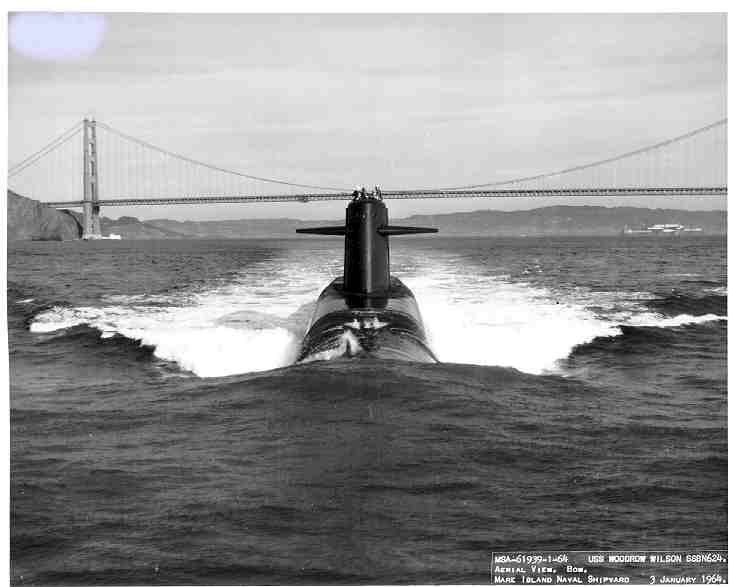
- USS Woodrow Wilson (SSBN-624) in San Francisco

History

United States
- Name: USS Woodrow Wilson
- Namesake: Woodrow Wilson (1856–1924), 28th President of the United States (1913–1921)
- Ordered: 9 February 1961
- Awarded: 9 February 1961
- Builder: Mare Island Naval Shipyard, Vallejo, California
- Laid down: 13 September 1961
- Launched: 22 February 1963
- Sponsored by: Miss Eleanor Axson Sayre, Wilson's Granddaughter
- Commissioned: 27 December 1963
- Decommissioned: 1 September 1994
- Reclassified: Attack submarine (SSN-624) in 1990
- Stricken: 1 September 1994
- Fate: Recycled via Ship-Submarine Recycling Program 26 September 1997 through 27 October 1998

General characteristics
- Class & type: Lafayette-class submarine
- Type: Ballistic missile submarine (hull design SCB-216)
- Displacement: 7,250 long tons (7,370 t) surfaced; 8,250 long tons (8,380 t) submerged
- Length: 425 ft (130 m)
- Beam: 33 ft (10 m)
- Draft: 31 ft 6 in (9.60 m)
- Propulsion: 1 × S5W reactor; 2 × General Electric geared turbines 15,000 shp (11,000 kW)
- Speed: 20 knots (37 km/h; 23 mph) surfaced; 25 knots (46 km/h; 29 mph) submerged
- Complement: Two crews (Blue Crew and Gold), 13 officers and 130 enlisted each
- Sensors & processing systems: BQS-4 sonar
- Armament: 4 × 21 in (530 mm) Mark 65 torpedo tubes with Mark 113 firecontrol system, for Mark 48 torpedoes; 16 × vertical tubes for Polaris or Poseidon ballistic missiles

USS Woodrow Wilson (SSBN-624), a Lafayette class ballistic missile submarine, was the only ship of the United States Navy to be named for Woodrow Wilson (1856–1924), the 28th President of the United States (1913–1921). She later was converted into an attack submarine and redesignated SSN-624.

== Construction and commissioning ==
The contract to build Woodrow Wilson was awarded to Mare Island Naval Shipyard at Vallejo, California, on 9 February 1961 and her keel was laid down there on 13 September 1961. She was launched on 22 February 1963 sponsored by Miss Eleanor Axson Sayre (Wilson's granddaughter), and commissioned on 27 December 1963, with Commander Cleo N. Mitchell in command of the Blue Crew and Commander Walter N. Dietzen in command of the Gold Crew.

== Operational history ==
Woodrow Wilson departed Mare Island Naval Shipyard on 9 January 1964, bound for the United States East Coast. After stopping briefly at San Diego, she proceeded on to the Panama Canal, arriving on 19 January 1964 at its western end. Violent anti-American demonstrations and riots over a recent flag-displaying incident had resulted in an extremely tense atmosphere. As a result, she transited the canal in a record seven hours ten minutes while combat-ready United States Marines and United States Army soldiers guarded the locks.

Making port at Charleston, South Carolina, on 5 February 1964, Woodrow Wilson conducted a shakedown cruise off the lower U.S. East Coast into March 1964 and underwent post-shakedown repairs and alterations into April 1964. She put to sea at the end of May 1964 upon the conclusion of these repairs and alterations and commenced her first deterrent patrol out of Charleston in June 1964.

Woodrow Wilson subsequently operated in the Atlantic Ocean until the autumn of 1968, conducting patrols from forward bases at Rota, Spain and Holy Loch, Scotland. After undergoing a 13-month overhaul and conversion to the Polaris A3 ballistic missile at Newport News Shipbuilding, she was transferred to the United States Pacific Fleet via Charleston and the Panama Canal, arriving at Pearl Harbor, Hawaii, on 19 November 1969. She then continued on to the western Pacific Ocean, was based at Guam, and conducted deterrent patrols from Apra Harbor through 1972.

In 1972, Woodrow Wilson shifted back to the Atlantic and another overhaul and conversion to the Poseidon C3 missile at Newport News Shipbuilding. She was then home-ported at Charleston for operations with the United States Atlantic Fleet.

On 4 June 1979, Woodrow Wilson ran aground in heavy fog at Race Rock while en route to New London, Connecticut. The submarine was able to free itself and proceed to port for inspection of the damage.

After several overhauls in the Charleston Naval Shipyard and 40 more deterrent patrols, Woodrow Wilson entered the Charleston Naval Shipyard for its final refueling overhaul in 1988. CDR Charles Peterson was relieved of both crews by CDR Glen Dilgren in August 1989. Hurricane Hugo struck on 21 September 1989 and resulted in a one-month shipyard shutdown. During the shutdown, crew members were assigned to help with recovery operations in the Charleston area, for which the ship was awarded the Humanitarian Service Medal. During Alfa sea trials in June 1990 and as a result of the Strategic Arms Reduction Treaty, Woodrow Wilson was directed to condense the crew, deactivate the missile systems and convert to an SSN. The ship was delivered for SSN Shakedown three months ahead of schedule.

During shakedown, the ship went 11-for-11 during AUTEC, WSAT and open ocean exercise torpedo firings against maneuvering targets. The missile compartment was configured for support of Naval Special Warfare, and the ship passed its initial SSN Tactical Readiness Evaluation. Following shakedown, the ship was assigned to Submarine Squadron Four at Charleston, SC and won the White "A" for excellence in Anti-Submarine Warfare. Woodrow Wilson was assigned missions in Fleet and NATO Exercises, Atlantic SSN Operations and a primary tasking in the development of new submarine and Naval Special Warfare tactics. In September 1991, the ship was a key participant in Exercise Phantom Shadow, the largest ever Navy and Special Warfare exercise, which lasted a month in the Western Atlantic and Caribbean. In the spring of 1992, Woodrow Wilson conducted a successful MK 48 warshot SINKEX during her 30th underway since completion of overhaul two years before. CDR Glen Dilgren was relieved by CDR Marshall Page in April 1992. During her final years of service, the ship continued SSN operations in the Atlantic, Mediterranean, and Caribbean.

== Decommissioning and disposal ==
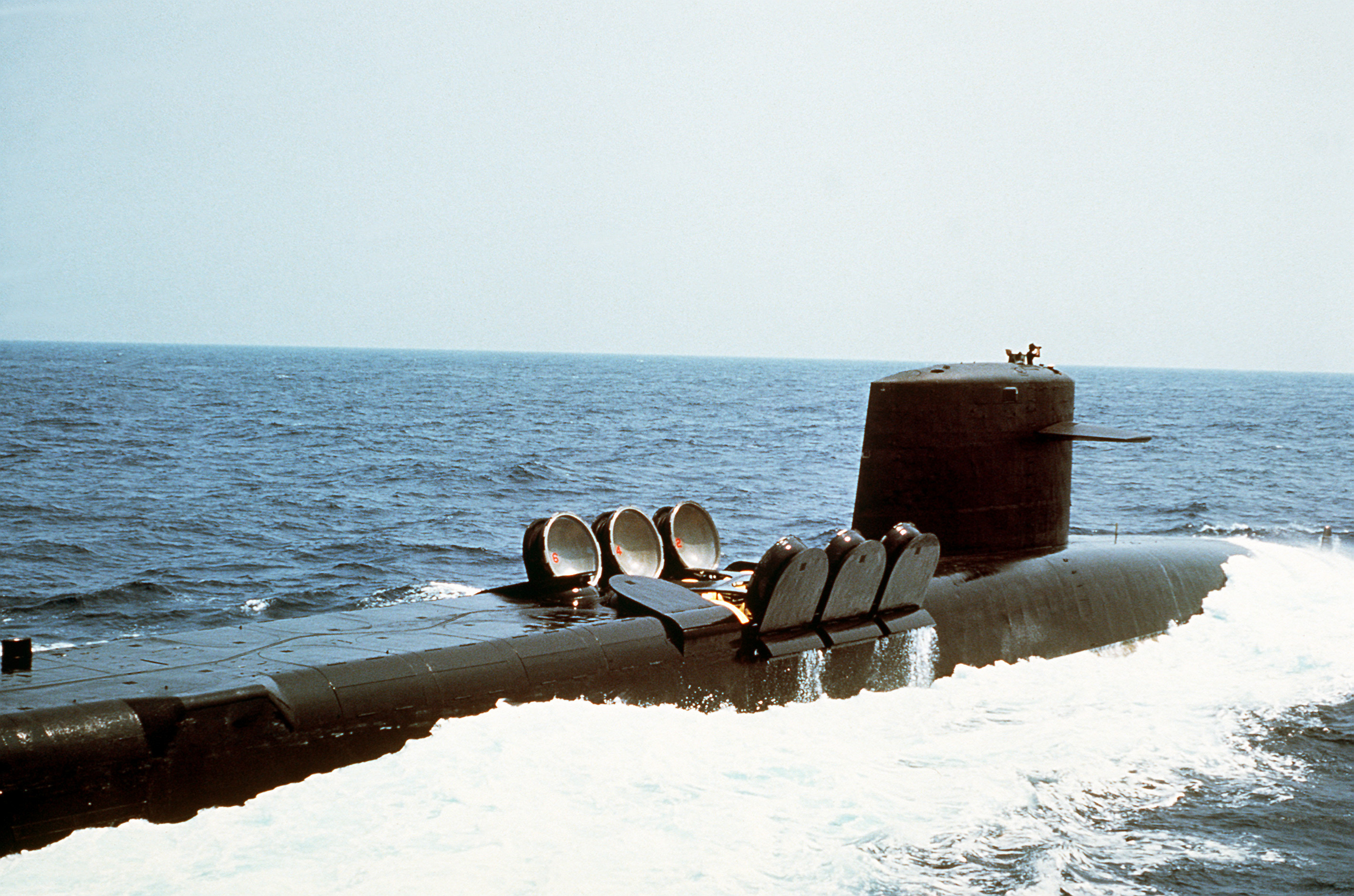
A starboard view of Woodrow Wilson underway, 1 February 1991

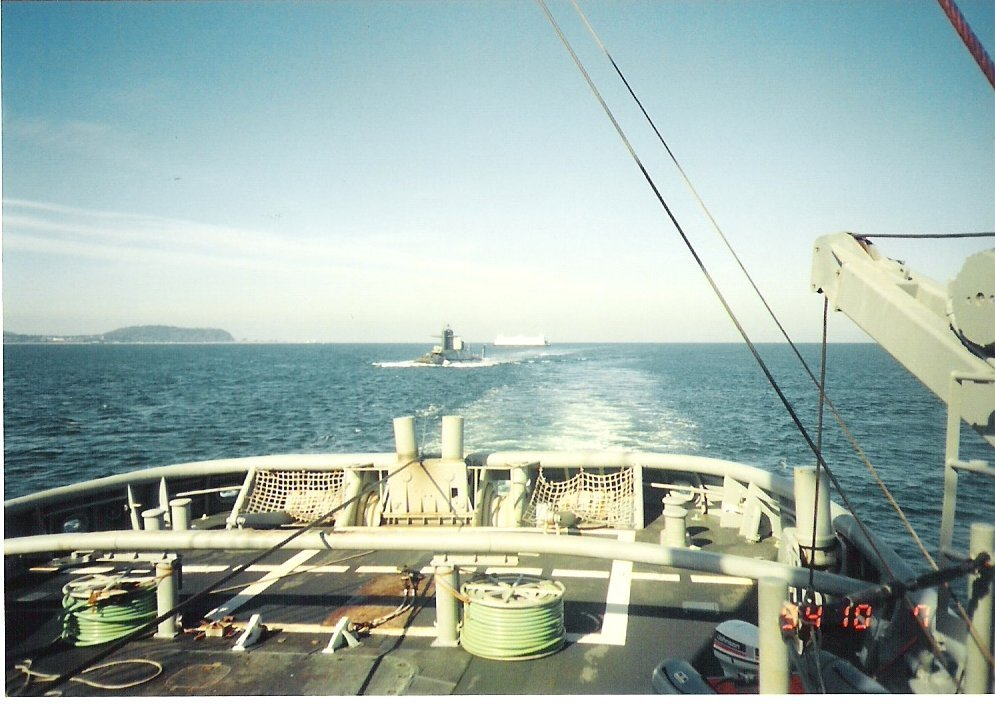
The salvage ship USS Salvor (ARS-52) towing the decommissioned Woodrow Wilson through Admiralty Inlet to Bremerton, Washington where Woodrow Wilson was destined for scrapping via the Ship-Submarine Recycling Program.

Woodrow Wilson was deactivated in September 1993. She was decommissioned on 1 September 1994 and stricken from the Naval Vessel Register the same day. Ex-Woodrow Wilson entered the Nuclear Powered Ship and Submarine Recycling Program at Bremerton, Washington, on 26 September 1997. Recycling of Ex-Woodrow Wilson was completed on 27 October 1998.

== Commemoration ==
Woodrow Wilson's sail is preserved as part of the Deterrent Park monument at Naval Base Kitsap in Bangor, Washington.
