= USS James Monroe =

Submarine of the United States

USS James Monroe (SSBN-622)
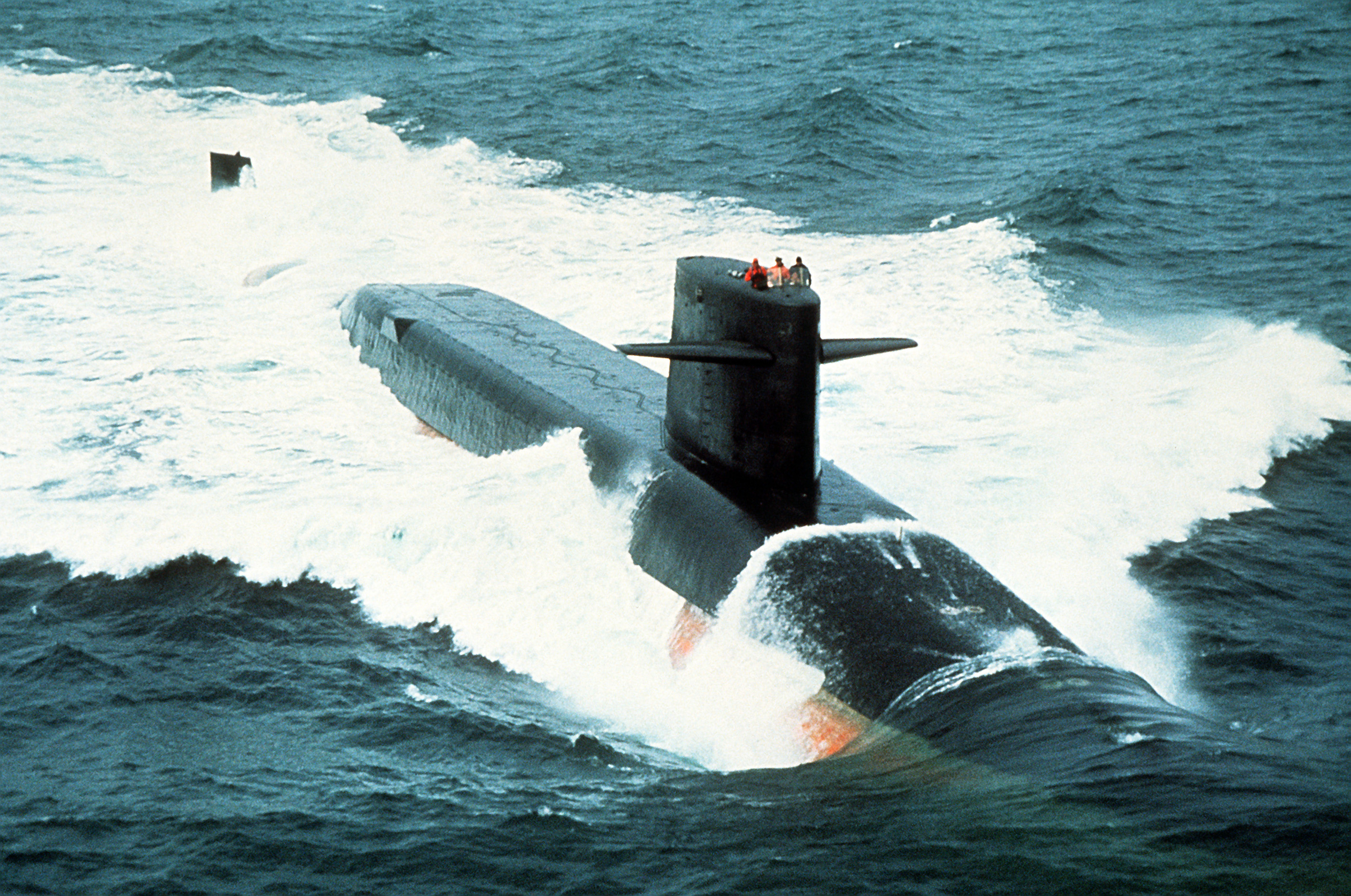
- USS James Monroe (SSBN-622)

History

United States
- Namesake: James Monroe (1758-1831), fifth President of the United States (1817-1825)
- Ordered: 3 February 1961
- Builder: Newport News Shipbuilding and Dry Dock Company
- Laid down: 31 July 1961
- Launched: 4 August 1962
- Sponsored by: Mrs. Roswell L. Gilpatric
- Commissioned: 7 December 1963
- Decommissioned: 25 September 1990
- Stricken: 25 September 1990
- Motto: "Watchful Waiting"
- Fate: Scrapping via Ship-Submarine Recycling Program completed 10 January 1995

General characteristics
- Class & type: Lafayette-class submarine
- Type: Ballistic missile submarine (hull design SCB-216)
- Displacement: 7,250 long tons (7,370 t) surfaced; 8,250 long tons (8,380 t) submerged
- Length: 425 ft (130 m)
- Beam: 33 ft (10 m)
- Draft: 31 ft 6 in (9.60 m)
- Propulsion: 1 × S5W reactor; 2 × Westinghouse geared turbines 15,000 shp (11,000 kW)
- Speed: 20 knots (37 km/h) surfaced; 25 knots (46 km/h) submerged
- Complement: Two crews (Blue Crew and Gold), 13 officers and 130 enlisted men each
- Sensors & processing systems: BQS-4 sonar
- Armament: 4 × 21 in (533 mm) Mark 65 torpedo tubes with Mark 113 firecontrol system, for Mark 48 torpedoes; 16 × vertical tubes for Polaris or Poseidon ballistic missiles

USS James Monroe (SSBN-622), a Lafayette-class ballistic missile submarine, was the only ship of the United States Navy to be named for Founding Father and U.S. president James Monroe. She served with the United States Navy from 1963 to 1990.

== Construction and commissioning ==
The contract to build James Monroe was awarded to Newport News Shipbuilding and Dry Dock Company in Newport News, Virginia on 3 February 1961 and her keel was laid down there on 31 July 1961. She was launched on 4 August 1962, sponsored by Mrs. Miriam Thorne Gilpatric, wife of Deputy Secretary of Defense Roswell L. Gilpatric, and commissioned on 7 December 1963, with Commander William H. Sandford in command of the Blue Crew and Commander Warren R. Cobean, Jr., in command of the Gold Crew.

== Operational history ==
Following shakedown off Florida's Cape Kennedy, James Monroe spent the early months of 1964 in ballistic missile tests. She departed for her first deterrent patrol in June 1964. On 17 January 1967, James Monroe completed her twelfth deterrent patrol, having operated from both Holy Loch, Scotland, and Rota, Spain. Preparations for the arrival of the submarine squadron went forward with haste throughout the remainder of 1978 and into 1979. Commander Submarine Squadron 16 greeted the submarine tender USS Simon Lake, when she arrived at Kings Bay on 2 July 1979. Four days later, USS James Monroe entered Kings Bay and moored alongside Simon Lake's starboard side to begin a routine refit in preparation for another nuclear weapons deterrence patrol.

== Decommissioning and disposal ==
James Monroe was decommissioned on 25 September 1990 and stricken from the Naval Vessel Register the same day. Ex-James Monroe entered the Nuclear Powered Ship and Submarine Recycling Program in Bremerton, Washington. Recycling of Ex-James Monroe was completed on 10 January 1995.
