= USS Henry Clay =

Submarine of the United States

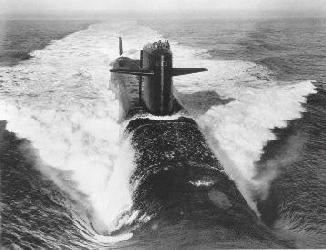
- USS Henry Clay (SSBN-625) on 6 December 1967.

History

United States
- Name: USS Henry Clay
- Namesake: Henry Clay (1777–1852), an American statesman and orator
- Ordered: 3 February 1961
- Builder: Newport News Shipbuilding and Dry Dock Company
- Laid down: 23 October 1961
- Launched: 30 November 1962
- Commissioned: 20 February 1964
- Decommissioned: 5 November 1990
- Stricken: 5 November 1990
- Motto: Preservation of the Nation
- Fate: Scrapping via Ship-Submarine Recycling Program completed 30 September 1997

General characteristics
- Class & type: Lafayette-class submarine
- Type: Ballistic missile submarine (hull design SCB-216)
- Displacement: 7,250 long tons (7,370 t) surfaced; 8,250 long tons (8,380 t) submerged
- Length: 425 ft (130 m)
- Beam: 33 ft (10 m)
- Draft: 31 ft 6 in (9.60 m)
- Propulsion: 1 × S5W reactor; 2 × Westinghouse geared turbines=15,000 shp (11,000 kW)
- Speed: 20 knots (37 km/h) surfaced; 25 knots (46 km/h) submerged
- Complement: Two crews (Blue and Gold), 13 officers and 130 enlisted men each
- Sensors & processing systems: BQS-4 sonar
- Armament: 4 × 21 in (530 mm) Mark 65 torpedo tubes with Mark 113 firecontrol system, for Mark 48 torpedoes; 16 × vertical tubes for Polaris or Poseidon ballistic missiles

USS Henry Clay (SSBN-625), a Lafayette class ballistic missile submarine, was the only ship of the United States Navy to be named for Henry Clay (1777–1852), the American statesman and orator.

== Construction and commissioning ==
The contract to build Henry Clay was awarded to Newport News Shipbuilding and Dry Dock Company in Newport News, Virginia on 3 February 1961 and her keel was laid down there on 23 October 1961. She was launched on 30 November 1962, sponsored by Mrs. Anna Gratz "Nannie" (Clay) Gibson, and commissioned on 20 February 1964, with Commander Thomas A Bryce in command of the Blue Crew and Commander John C. Lewis in command of the Gold Crew.

== Operational history ==
Henry Clay conducted shakedown off the coast of Florida beginning on 28 February 1964. She completed her first submerged Polaris missile firing on 6 April 1964 and returned to Newport News on 29 May 1964.

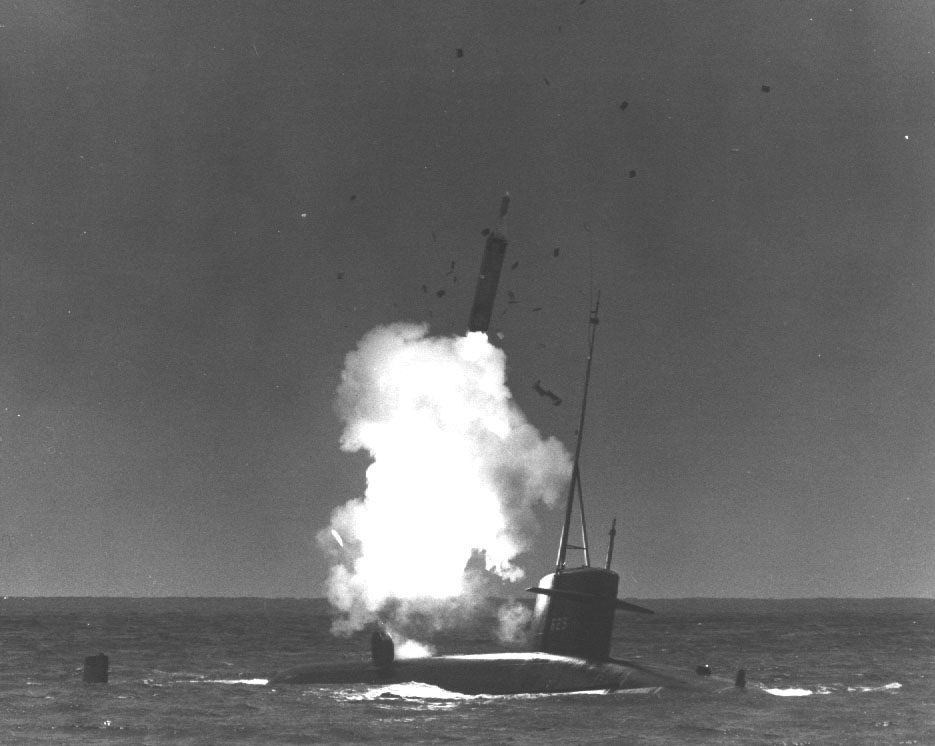
April 1964 Polaris missile launch

She then moved to her new home port, Charleston, South Carolina, and departed for her first deterrent patrol on 17 August 1964.

By January 1967, Henry Clay had completed 11 deterrent patrols. As of mid-1967, she was assigned to Submarine Squadron 14.

During December 1986, Henry Clay made a port call at Plymouth, England, while being operated by her Gold crew, the only port call the Crew made between April 1985 and October 1987.

In 1987, Henry Clay's Gold Crew underwent an unannounced Operational Reactor Safeguards Examination (ORSE). She received an EXCELLENT grade, the only submarine in the United States Atlantic Fleet other than the attack submarine USS Hyman G. Rickover (SSN-709) up to that date to receive an EXCELLENT on an unannounced ORSE.

RECORD SETTING: In 1989, in preparation for its final deterrent patrol, the Henry Clay crew spent just three days in Holy Loch, Scotland for its refit (instead of the normal three week refit period), and onloaded 250,000 pounds of food. Henry Clay spent a record 121 days (April–August) beneath the North Atlantic waves on deterrent patrol. It made two, short back to back port calls in Plymouth and Portsmouth, England respectively. After its successful patrol, the Henry Clay pulled into Norfolk, VA for a brief rest and to pick up many of the crew's (male) family members for a three-day, fun "Tiger Cruise" to her home port of Charleston, South Carolina.

== Decommissioning and disposal ==
Henry Clay was decommissioned on 5 November 1990 and stricken from the Naval Vessel Register the same day. She entered the Nuclear Powered Ship and Submarine Recycling Program in Bremerton, Washington, for scrapping, which was completed on 30 September 1997.
