= USS Alexander Hamilton (SSBN-617) =

Submarine of the United States

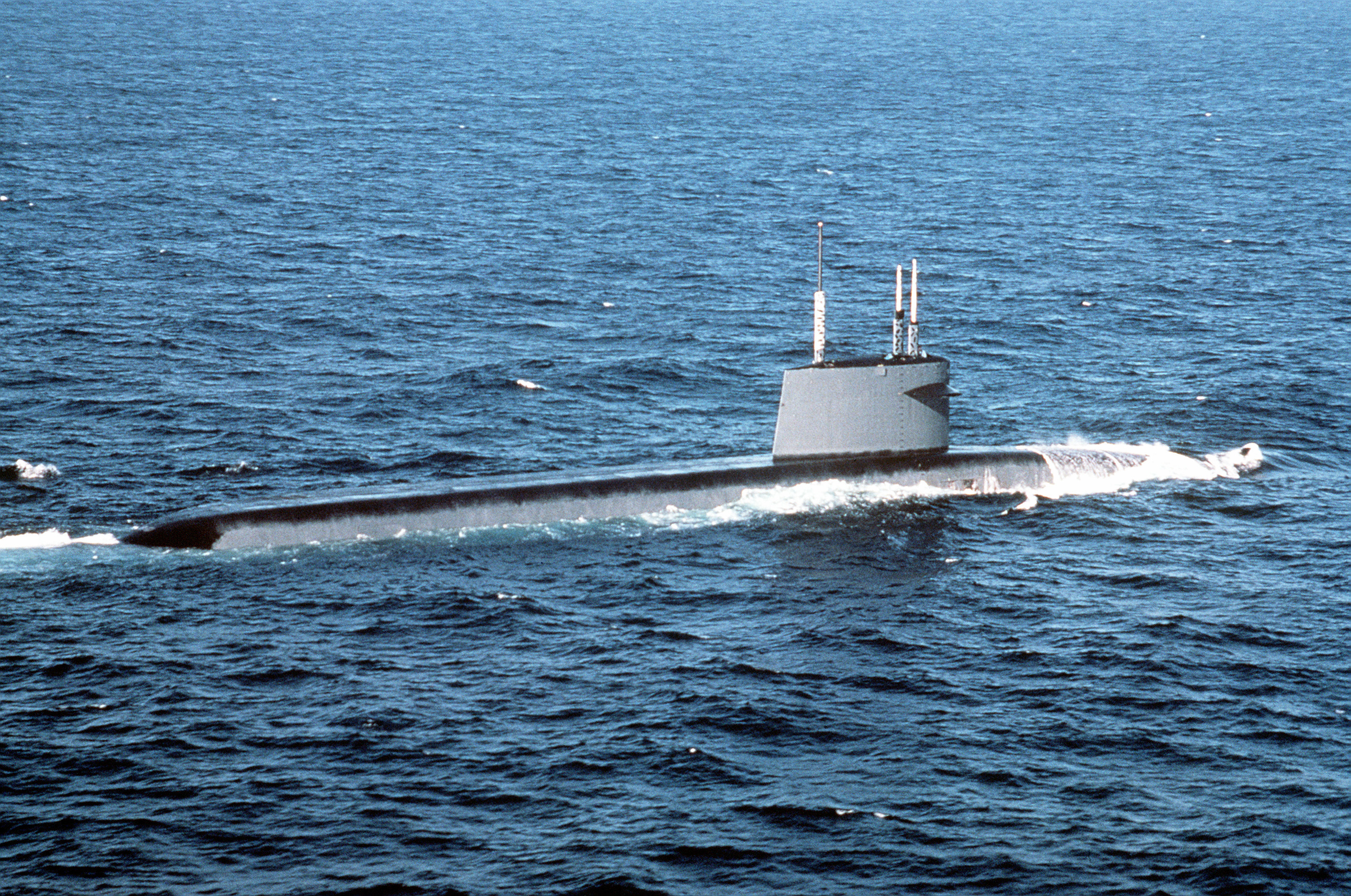
- USS Alexander Hamilton (SSBN-617)

History

United States
- Name: USS Alexander Hamilton
- Namesake: Alexander Hamilton (1757–1804), a Founding Father of the United States
- Ordered: 22 July 1960
- Builder: General Dynamics Electric Boat
- Laid down: 26 June 1961
- Launched: 18 August 1962
- Sponsored by: Mrs. Valentine Hollingsworth, Jr.
- Commissioned: 27 June 1963
- Decommissioned: 23 February 1993
- Stricken: 23 February 1993
- Fate: Scrapping via Ship-Submarine Recycling Program completed 28 February 1994

General characteristics
- Class & type: Lafayette-class ballistic missile submarine (hull design SCB-216)
- Displacement: 7,250 long tons (7,370 t) surfaced; 8,250 long tons (8,380 t) submerged
- Length: 425 ft (130 m)
- Beam: 33 ft (10 m)
- Draft: 31 ft 6 in (9.60 m)
- Propulsion: 1 × S5W reactor; 2 × General Electric geared turbines=15,000 shp (11,000 kW)
- Speed: 20 knots (37 km/h) surfaced; 25 knots (46 km/h) submerged
- Complement: Two crews (Blue Crew and Gold), 13 officers and 130 enlisted men each
- Sensors & processing systems: BQS-4 sonar
- Armament: 4 × 21 in (530 mm) Mark 65 torpedo tubes with Mark 113 firecontrol system, for Mark 48 torpedoes; 16 × vertical tubes for Polaris or Poseidon ballistic missiles

USS Alexander Hamilton (SSBN-617) was a United States Lafayette-class ballistic missile submarine. It was the third ship of the United States Navy to be named for Founding Father Alexander Hamilton, the first US Secretary of the Treasury, who was instrumental in the formation of both the United States Coast Guard and the United States Navy.

== Construction and commissioning ==
Alexander Hamilton's keel was laid down on 26 June 1961 at Groton, Connecticut, by the Electric Boat Division of the General Dynamics Corporation. She was launched on 18 August 1962 sponsored by Carolie Frances (Woods) Hollingsworth, the great-great-great granddaughter of Alexander Hamilton, and the wife of Valentine Hollingsworth, Jr., and commissioned on 27 June 1963 with Commander Norman B. Bessac commanding the Blue Crew and Commander Benjamin F. Sherman, Jr., commanding the Gold Crew.

== Operational history ==
Between 28 June and 18 October 1963, Alexander Hamilton carried out two shakedown cruises, one for each of her crews. Following those operations, she conducted post-shakedown availability. After trials early in 1964, she departed the United States East Coast on 16 March 1964 to deploy to Rota, Spain, her base of operations. She conducted deterrent patrols out of that port for the remainder of 1964 as a unit of Submarine Squadron 16. In January 1965, she transferred to Submarine Squadron 14 and was rebased at Holy Loch, Scotland. Her cycle of patrols from there lasted until 2 June 1967, at which time she returned to the United States at Charleston, South Carolina. Later that month, she moved north to New London, Connecticut, and from there into the Electric Boat shipyard on 18 June 1967 to begin her first overhaul and nuclear refueling.

Alexander Hamilton completed the overhaul on 28 June 1968 and conducted post-overhaul trials, inspections, and shakedown training until early October 1968. In November, she began a deterrent patrol en route to Rota, her new base, where she arrived on 30 December 1968. For the next four years, she operated from Rota as a unit of Submarine Squadron 16.

At the conclusion of her 31st deterrent patrol, Alexander Hamilton returned to Charleston in November 1972 and in January 1973 began her second refueling overhaul, combined with a conversion to carry Poseidon missiles, at the shipyard of the Newport News Shipbuilding and Dry Dock Company. The work on those two modifications lasted for over two years. Upon its completion, she carried out shakedown in April 1975 and devoted the remainder of the year to training and various post-overhaul trials. She conducted her 32nd and 33rd deterrent patrols in the early part of 1976. Alexander Hamilton concluded the 33rd patrol at Holy Loch in May 1976 and conducted her next three deterrent patrols from that base. While on her 35th patrol, she visited Port Canaveral, Florida, and New London, Connecticut, before concluding that patrol at Charleston in March 1977. During March and April 1977, she completed refit and conducted refresher training. In July 1977, she departed Charleston for another deterrent patrol which ended with her arrival at Holy Loch in September 1977.

From Holy Loch, Alexander Hamilton conducted her 39th and 40th deterrent patrols. She departed Holy Loch in May 1978 for her 41st deterrent patrol and concluded it at Charleston in July 1978. She remained there until August 1978 when she got underway for New London. She arrived at New London early in September 1978 and, after exchanging crews, embarked upon her 42nd deterrent patrol later that month. She ended that patrol at Holy Loch in October 1978. Over the next year, she made four patrols from Holy Loch. On 31 October 1979, she departed Holy Loch on her 46th deterrent patrol, ending it at Charleston on 7 December 1979. Early in January 1980, she departed Charleston on her 47th deterrent patrol. She concluded that patrol at Holy Loch on 17 March 1980 and operated from that base for the remainder of 1980.

On March 3, 1981, The USS Alexander Hamilton (SSBN 617) snagged the nets of the Aquila, a 73-foot fishing vessel from Campbeltown, Scotland, and towed it astern for two miles in the Sound of Jura. The crew had to cut $3,200 of gear and the U.S. government reimbursed the cost. This event was featured in a Navy Times February 19, 1990 article.

In May 1982, she left for patrol #56 with the Blue Crew under the command of Captain Marcus V. Friedman and Executive Officer Shaffer. In July 1982, the crew was treated to an initiation ceremony into the Realm of the Arctic Circle where first time participants were subsequently issued a "Blue Nose" certificate. The Hamilton returned to Holy Loch in late August 1982 and the ship was turned over to the Gold Crew. On 19 November 1982 a Change of Command Ceremony was held in Groton, CT for the USS Alexander Hamilton (SSBN 617) (Blue) between Commander Marcus V. Friedman (detaching) and Commander Corwin Guy Mendenhall III (relieving). Blue Crew patrol #58 started in December 1982 under the command of Captain Mendenhall and concluded in March 1983. This patrol included a brief stop in Plymouth, England in March 1983 where the crew was given a chance to visit the city. Patrol #60, again staffed by the Blue Crew, departed Holy Loch in June 1983 and returned the following October. In January, 1984 the Blue Crew once again departed Holy Loch for patrol #62 and returned in April 1984.

=== Planned deactivation and reprieve ===
Alexander Hamilton's deterrent patrols out of Holy Loch continued until 1986. At that time, she was to have been decommissioned in order to remove her from the fleet as a gesture of goodwill in accordance with the terms of the unratified SALT II strategic arms limitation treaty. Upon her arrival in Groton early in 1986, she began preparations for deactivation. The grounding of the ballistic missile submarine USS Nathanael Greene, however, forced the Navy to change its plans. What had been a deactivation overhaul quickly became a four-week maintenance availability for repairs to get Alexander Hamilton ready for active service. In April 1986, she departed for Charleston, South Carolina, for further work conducted in the floating drydock USS Alamogordo. While at Charleston, she also served at sea occasionally as a training platform.

In mid-June 1986, Alexander Hamilton returned to Groton. During the summer of 1986, she participated in training cruises for United States Naval Academy and Naval Reserve Officer Training Corps midshipmen.

In August 1986, Alexander Hamilton's crew learned that her refueling overhaul would be conducted by the Puget Sound Naval Shipyard Bremerton, Washington. She departed Groton on 1 October 1986 to begin the voyage to Bremerton. Steaming by way of the Panama Canal, she arrived at Bremerton late in November 1986. She formally began her refueling overhaul on 30 November 1987.

On 28 April 1992, The USS Alexander Hamilton SSBN 617 conducted dive number 1000, the most recorded dives ever done by a SSBN submarine.

History needed for 1987-1993

== Decommissioning and disposal ==
Decommissioned and stricken from the Naval Vessel Register on 23 February 1993, Alexander Hamilton was disposed of through the Nuclear Powered Ship and Submarine Recycling Program at the Puget Sound Naval Shipyard. Recycling was completed on 28 February 1994.
