= USS Lafayette (SSBN-616) =

Submarine of the United States

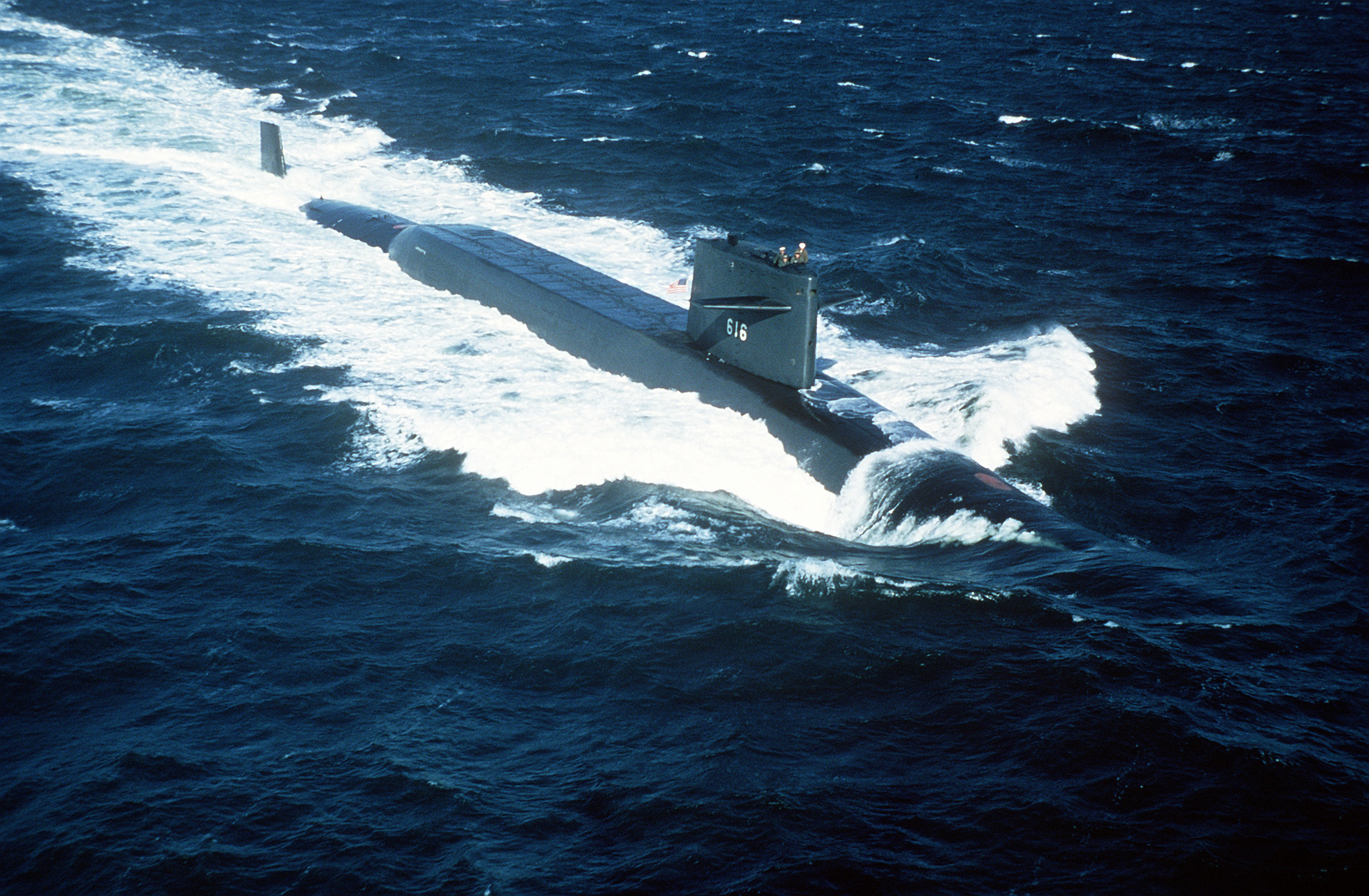
- USS Lafayette (SSBN-616)

History

United States
- Name: USS Lafayette
- Namesake: Gilbert du Motier, Marquis de Lafayette (1757-1834), a French hero of the American Revolutionary War
- Ordered: 22 July 1960
- Builder: General Dynamics Electric Boat
- Laid down: 17 January 1961
- Launched: 8 May 1962
- Sponsored by: Jacqueline Kennedy
- Commissioned: 23 April 1963
- Decommissioned: 12 August 1991
- Stricken: 12 August 1991
- Fate: Entered Ship-Submarine Recycling Program 12 August 1991; recycling completed 25 February 1992

General characteristics
- Class & type: Lafayette-class submarine
- Type: Ballistic missile submarine (hull design SCB-216)
- Displacement: 7,250 long tons (7,370 t) surfaced; 8,250 long tons (8,380 t) submerged
- Length: 425 ft (130 m)
- Beam: 33 ft (10 m)
- Draft: 31 ft 6 in (9.60 m)
- Propulsion: 1 × S5W reactor; 2 × General Electric geared turbines=15,000 shp (11,000 kW)
- Speed: 20 knots (37 km/h) surfaced; 25 knots (46 km/h) submerged
- Complement: Two crews (Blue Crew and Gold), 13 officers and 130 enlisted men each
- Sensors & processing systems: BQS-4 sonar
- Armament: 4 × 21 in (530 mm) Mark 65 torpedo tubes with Mark 113 firecontrol system, for Mark 48 torpedoes; 16 × vertical tubes for Polaris or Poseidon ballistic missiles

USS Lafayette (SSBN-616), the lead ship of her class of ballistic missile submarine, was the third ship of the United States Navy to be named to honor Gilbert du Motier, Marquis de Lafayette, a French military hero who fought alongside and significantly aided the Continental Army during the American Revolutionary War.

== Construction and commissioning ==
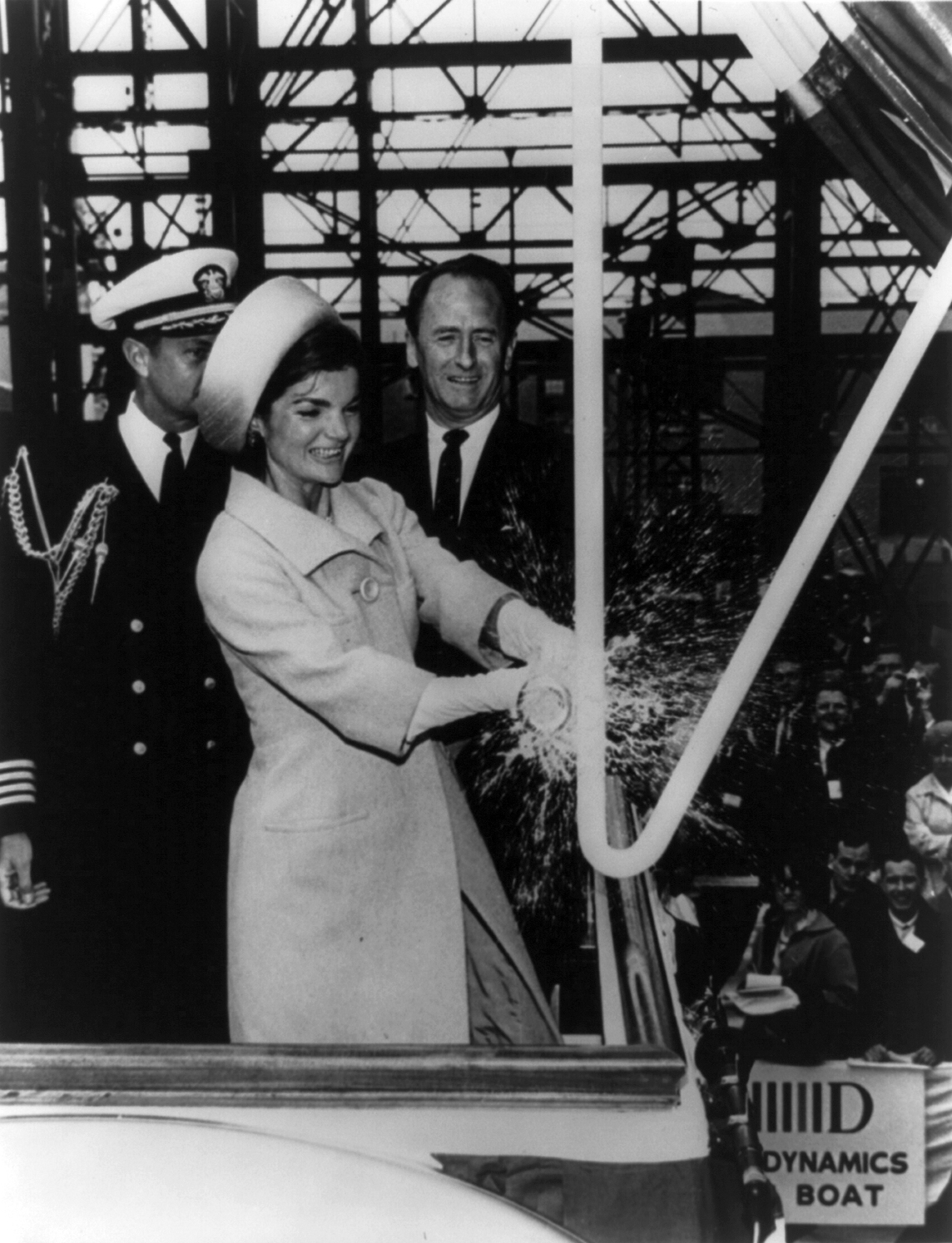
Jacqueline Kennedy christening Lafayette

Lafayette's keel was laid down on 17 January 1961 by the Electric Boat Division of General Dynamics in Groton, Connecticut. She was launched 8 May 1962, sponsored by First Lady Jacqueline Kennedy, wife of John F. Kennedy, the 35th President of the United States, and commissioned 23 April 1963 at Groton, Connecticut, with Commander P. J. Hannifin in command of the Blue Crew and Commander James T. Strong in command of the Gold Crew.

== Operational history ==
After a shakedown in the Caribbean Sea, Lafayette loaded Polaris ballistic missiles at Charleston, South Carolina, and during June 1963 sailed to Cape Canaveral, Florida, for ballistic missile maneuvers. She fired four missiles, two by each crew, after which she proceeded to Groton, arriving there on 2 August 1963. For the rest of the year her two crews alternately took her through a series of exercises before she took her place in the Navy's expanding fleet ballistic missile submarine fleet.

Lafayette departed Charleston on 4 January 1964 for her first deterrent patrol in the Atlantic Ocean. During the next four years, Lafayette made 16 deterrent patrols out of Rota, Spain. Her 15th patrol, the 400th of the Polaris submarine fleet, won Lafayette special commendation from Secretary of the Navy Paul Nitze. She returned to Charleston from her 16th patrol on 23 August 1967. A week later, she arrived at Newport News, Virginia, for a major overhaul by Newport News Shipbuilding to prepare for future service. On 28 December 1968, Lafayette's overhaul officially ended and in January 1969, she once again took up her position with the fleet.

On 18 May 1969, Lafayette departed Charleston, South Carolina, for her 17th Polaris patrol, and before the year was out, logged two more such evolutions. During 1970, she conducted four more (Patrols 20-23 inclusive). Lafayette, her Gold Crew on board, departed on Patrol 24 in January 1971, returning in March to Rota whereupon the Blue Crew prepared for Patrol 25, departing in April and returning in June. Subsequently, the Gold Crew conducted Patrol 26 from July until September. On 1 September, Lafayette launched five Polaris A-2 missiles; the boat's performance during the ensuing "operation of great importance to the United States Government [1–30 September 1971]," during which time she "maintained an impressively high state of readiness and demonstrated conclusively the effectiveness and dependability of the Fleet Ballistic Missile System ... attested to the professional competence, technical skill and sustained team effort" of Lafayette's Gold Crew, earning them a Meritorious Unit Commendation (awarded 11 May 1973). Soon thereafter, the Blue Crew carried out Patrol 27. Upon Lafayette's return in October, the Gold Crew made ready for Patrol 28, departing in December.

During the first few months of 1972, Lafayette successfully completed and undertook three Polaris patrols, as well as transited from Rota to New London, Connecticut. Following her arrival at the latter port, she performed weekly operations in support of Commander Submarine Force, Atlantic's, Second-Class Midshipmen Submarine Summer Indoctrination, continuing until September, during which time she provided underway training for over 1,000 midshipmen. Rear Admiral Paul J. Early, Commander Submarine Flotilla 2, later commended Lafayette for her "careful preparation and superb execution which characterized your participating in this vital program. Midshipmen reaction was consistently favorable. Such a response is clear evidence of a sustained, dedicated effort on the part of the Commanding Officer and Crew and reflects admirable standards of leadership and performance."

Dr. Franklin B. Lincoln Jr., a member of the President's Foreign Intelligence Advisory Board, toured Lafayette on 27 June and received a briefing "on the operations and conditions aboard [sic] a Fleet Ballistic Missile Submarine." On 23 August, the boat hosted a large group of students from the Naval War College, Newport, R.I., "for the purpose of [their] obtaining insight into the operational capabilities and limitations, manning and habitability of the modern FBM submarine." Mr. Leif Leifland, Minister Plenipotentiary and Extraordinary to the Royal Swedish Embassy embarked for a tour on 2 October; Rear Admiral Edwin E. McMorries (SC), Commanding Officer, Ships Parts Control Center, Mechanicsburg, Pa., visited the boat on 3 October; two days later, author Joseph M. Duckert visited Lafayette in the course of gathering information "for his latest book, Nuclear Ships of the World."

Having completed sound trials, Lafayette conducted a weapons off-load to prepare for entrance into the Electric Boat yard for what was slated to be an 18-month overhaul and conversion to enable her to employ the new Poseidon missile. Following that, the Blue and Gold Crews combined into a single overhaul crew on 6 October 1972, Lafayette entering the shipyard on the 13th.

Lafayette lay in the yard for the remainder of 1972 and all of 1973, and ultimately emerged from her conversion work at Electric Boat ("schedule slippage [due to] work force dilution at these yards [Electric Boat and Newport News] which have high current and projected workload") on 7 November 1974. She then embarked Vice Admiral Joe Williams, Jr., Commander Submarine Force, U.S. Atlantic Fleet, who observed post-overhaul shakedown training (24–29 November). On 16 December, while operating out of Port Canaveral, Lafayette's Blue Crew conducted the successful launch of a Poseidon C-3 missile as part of her post-availability shakedown, making Lafayette the first of her class to fire one of those weapons. Rear Admiral Levering Smith, Director, Strategic Systems Project Office, Rear Admiral Albert L. Kelln, Commander, Submarine Group 6, and Brig. Gen. J. H. Ahmann, Commander, Air Force Eastern Test Range, witnessed the test. The Blue Crew completed post-overhaul shakedown training on 21 January 1975 having visited Charleston, S.C., Port Canaveral, Fla., and Exuma Sound, Bahamas, during the course of those evolutions; relieved by the Gold Crew at Charleston, the latter conducted their post-overhaul shakedown training, conducting Weapons System Accuracy Trials (WSAT) at St. Croix, Virgin Islands, and Mk. 48 Torpedo Certification in Exuma Sound. Following another crew exchange at Charleston, the Blue Crew carried out Mk. 48 Torpedo Certification in Exuma Sound, and took Lafayette to Groton for an eight-month post-conversion availability. Returning to Charleston to exchange crews, Lafayette conducted two more patrols, 31 and 32, to round out the year.

During the first half of 1976, Lafayette carried out Patrols 33 (Gold) and 34 (Blue) from Holy Loch; her Gold Crew conducted Patrol 35, carrying out evolutions in the eastern Atlantic, after which time the boat fired a Mk. 48 torpedo proficiency in the Tongue of the Ocean, Bahamas. Following the Blue Crew's conducting the next refit at Charleston, Lafayette conducted torpedo proficiency work in the Tongue of the Ocean, and local operations off the eastern seaboard, then Patrol 36. The Gold Crew relieved the Blue at Holy Loch in January 1977, and the two crews alternated conducting Poseidon deterrent patrols (37-40) from that site. In June of that year (1977), Lafayette, to demonstrate "the continuing effectiveness of the Fleet Ballistic Missile weapon system," launched two Poseidon missiles in an operational test.

Lafayette completed Patrols 41 and 42 in the first half of 1978. Patrol 41 included operations in the Eastern Atlantic followed by an Mk. 48 torpedo proficiency firing period at the AUTEC range near Bermuda. Subsequently, the Blue Crew conducted refit at Charleston, after which Lafayette performed Mk. 48 torpedo proficiency firings at the AUTEC range and midshipman training out of New London and Charleston. Relieving the Blue Crew at Holy Loch, the Gold Crew conducted a refit there, thereafter carrying out Patrol 43. Following that, the Blue Crew relieved the Gold Crew in December. The New Year 1979 saw the crews completing Patrols 44 and 45. Thereafter, refit periods took place in Holy Loch. Patrols 46 and 47 took place in the second half of the year; 46 included operations in the Eastern Atlantic followed by an Mk. 48 torpedo proficiency firing period at the AUTEC range near Bermuda, with the Gold Crew conducting a subsequent refit in King's Bay, Georgia. Upon completion of the refit, the Gold Crew again conducted an Mk. 48 torpedo proficiency firing at the AUTEC range near Bermuda, after which they enjoyed a port call at Port Canaveral, Florida.

For the first eleven months of 1980, Lafayette conducted Patrols 48, 49 and 50, interspersed with refits at Holy Loch. In December, the combined crew refitted the boat at Groton. In early January 1981, she hosted a dependents cruise from New London to Norfolk, Virginia. Subsequently, Lafayette got underway for Patrol 51. In February, she completed a missile offload in Charleston in preparation for arriving at the shipyard on 2 March, and on the 6th, entered the newly constructed dry dock at Newport News for an extended refuelling overhaul. She then spent the rest of 1982 in Newport News.

On 23 April 1983, Lafayette celebrated the 20th anniversary of her commissioning. Although the ship had already completed Alpha and Bravo sea trials while in the shipyard, a change of command ceremony held on 20 May officially welcomed her back into the operational fleet. Both crews subsequently completed a shakedown period consisting of an Operational Reactor Safeguards Examination (ORSE), a Mk. 48 torpedo certification, a demonstration and shakedown operation and a Nuclear Weapons Acceptance Inspection. Following this, on 28 December, the Gold crew began a post-overhaul upkeep in Charleston, awaiting deployment for Patrol 52. Throughout 1984, she participated in operations in conjunction with Submarine Squadron 14 (to which she had been reassigned), based at Holy Loch.

Lafayette began 1985 with a refit at Holy Loch in preparation for Patrol 56, after which the Gold Crew achieved superior results on the ORSE. Subsequently, the Blue Crew completed a refit and Patrol 57, which included a Tactical Readiness Evaluation and a Navy Technical Proficiency Inspection at its conclusion. The Gold Crew relieved the Blue in June, refitting the ship and thereafter conducting Patrol 58, at the end of which they passed a Defense Nuclear Surety Inspection, a Navy Technical Proficiency Inspection and a Tactical Readiness Evaluation. Following that, the Blue Crew refitted the boat and executed Patrol 59.

On 30 January 1986, while moored alongside the large auxiliary floating dry dock Los Alamos, Lafayette suffered serious damage during high winds. Docked in Los Alamos with less than 24-hour notice (for which the dry dock received a letter of appreciation), Lafayette underwent repairs (1–25 February) which delayed the start of her patrol. After completion of the necessary work, the Gold Crew took the boat out for Patrol 60, with the crew passing an ORSE. The Blue Crew then completed a refit and got underway for Patrol 61, and following this, completed a Tactical Readiness Evaluation and a Navy Technical Proficiency Inspection. By July, the Gold Crew was again on board, undertaking Patrol 62, and thereafter, conducted an unscheduled ORSE and a Tactical Readiness Evaluation. Relieving them in November, the Blue Crew, after completion of a refit, commenced Patrol 63.

Upon completion of Patrol 63, Lafayette transited to Charleston Weapons Station on 20 February 1987 and, after shipyard maintenance, departed Charleston for Patrol 64. While egressing the port, she was slightly off course and technically ran aground, even though it was just dragging the rudder through the mud. She was ordered to moor at Charleston Navy Base pending a Board of Inquiry. Three days later, she set sail and performed Patrols 64 to 66, (20 February-27 May, 28 May-5 September, 6 September-15 December respectively) returning to Holy Loch to refit. Subsequently, she got underway on 16 December for Patrol 67, during which she enjoyed a port visit in Lisbon, Portugal, from 24–29 February 1988. Underway on 25 March for Patrol 68, she returned to Holy Loch on 1 July. The following day, she commenced Patrol 69, returning on 11 October for refit, venturing out on 12 October to begin Patrol 70.

Subsequent to her completion of Patrol 70 on 19 January 1989, Lafayette stood out again on the 20th for Patrol 71 returning on 28 April. Following this, she commenced Patrol 72 on the 29th, during which she made the first port visit of an American submarine to Brest, France, where she participated in the Bastille Day celebrations. Following her return to Holy Loch on 6 August, the boat commenced Patrol 73 the next day. Completing Patrol 73 on 8 November, and Patrol 74 on 22 February 1990, Lafayette conducted a warm water refit at King's Bay, then conducted Patrol 75, during the course of which she celebrated the 27th anniversary of her commissioning. Competing Patrol 75 on 12 May 1990, she completed her 76th, and last, patrol on 20 September 1990.

During a change of command ceremony at Groton on 5 October 1990, Lafayette became a one-crew submarine with the combination/transfer of the Blue and Gold Crews. Exhibiting her ability to continue to be "an exceptionally quiet and capable platform," she subsequently exercised with attack submarine Boston, and ultimately returned to Groton on 19 December 1990 to prepare for her interfleet transfer to Bremerton, Washington, under the operational control of Commander-in-Chief, Pacific Fleet, under the administrative control of Commander Submarine Group 9 for inactivation.

== Deactivation, decommissioning, and disposal ==
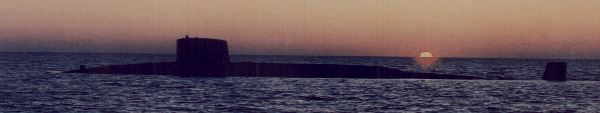
Lafayette silhouetted at sunset.

Deactivated while still in commission on 1 March 1991, Lafayette was decommissioned and stricken from the Naval Vessel Register on 12 August 1991. Ex-Lafayette entered the Navy's Nuclear Powered Ship and Submarine Recycling Program at Bremerton, Washington, the day she was stricken. Recycling of Ex-Lafayette was completed on 25 February 1992.

== See also ==
- Fleet Ballistic Missile
