= Lafayette-class submarine =

United States Navy class of fleet ballistic missile submarines

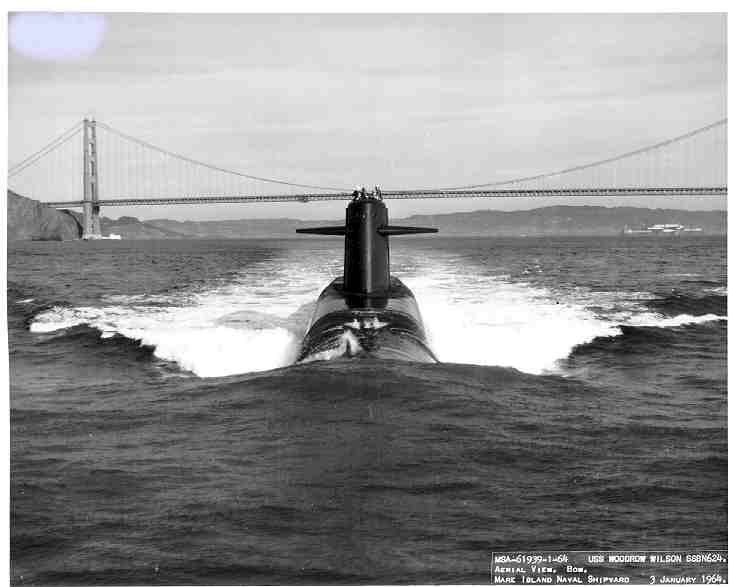
- Lafayette-class submarine USS Woodrow Wilson

Class overview
- Name: Lafayette class
- Builders: General Dynamics Electric Boat; Mare Island Naval Shipyard; Portsmouth Naval Shipyard; Newport News Shipbuilding and Drydock Company
- Operators: United States Navy
- Preceded by: Ethan Allen class
- Succeeded by: James Madison class
- Built: 1961–1964
- In commission: 1963–1994
- Completed: 9
- Laid up: 1 (as training vessel)

General characteristics
- Type: Nuclear-powered ballistic missile submarine
- Displacement: Surfaced: 7,325 long tons (7,443 t) Submerged: 8,251 long tons (8,383 t)
- Length: 425 ft (130 m)
- Beam: 33 ft (10 m)
- Draft: 28 ft 6 in (8.69 m)
- Propulsion: 1 × S5W PWR; 2 geared steam turbines (15,000 shp (11,000 kW)), 1 shaft
- Speed: 16 knots (30 km/h) surfaced; 21 knots (39 km/h) submerged
- Test depth: 1,300 feet (400 m)
- Complement: Two crews of 14 officers and 126 enlisted
- Armament: 16 Polaris A2/A3 or Poseidon C3 missiles, 4 × 21-inch (533 mm) torpedo tubes, 12 torpedoes

The Lafayette class of submarine was an evolutionary development from the Ethan Allen class of fleet ballistic missile submarine, slightly larger and generally improved. This class, together with the George Washington, Ethan Allen, James Madison, and Benjamin Franklin classes, composed the "41 for Freedom," the Navy's primary contribution to the nuclear deterrent force through the late 1980s. The James Madison and Benjamin Franklin classes are combined with the Lafayettes in some references.

== Design ==
The first eight submarines initially deployed with the Polaris A-2 missile, later being refitted with the longer ranged Polaris A-3, with USS Daniel Webster having the A-3 missile from the start. In the mid-1970s all were upgraded to carry the Poseidon C3 missile; their missile tubes were slightly larger than the Ethan Allen and George Washington classes and Poseidon was designed to take advantage of this. Unlike twelve of the similar James Madison and Benjamin Franklin classes, none of the Lafayette-class submarines were refitted with Trident I (C4) missiles.

The Lafayettes and their successors were equipped with a hovering system to manage trim more effectively when firing missiles; this increased the missile rate of fire from one per minute to four per minute.

Daniel Webster was originally built with diving planes mounted on a "mini-sail" near the bow, leading to her nickname "Old Funny Fins". This configuration, unique to US submarines, was an attempt to reduce the effect of porpoising. While successful, the "mini-sail" required to contain the operating mechanism reduced hydrodynamic efficiency and lowered her overall speed. During a mid-1970s overhaul these unusual planes were removed and standard fairwater planes were installed. Here is a rare 1964 16mm Silent Film of USS Daniel Webster testing the unique "Funny Fins" diving planes off Cape Canaveral.

== Fate ==
The Lafayettes were decommissioned between 1986 and 1992, due to a combination of SALT II treaty limitations as the Ohio class SSBNs entered service, age, and the collapse of the Soviet Union. One (Daniel Webster) remains out of commission but converted to a Moored Training Ship (MTS-626) with the missile compartment removed. She was stationed at Nuclear Power Training Unit Charleston, South Carolina, along with USS La Jolla and USS San Francisco until 2021, when she is preparing for inactivation.

== Boats in class ==
Submarines of the Lafayette class:

Hull number	Name	Builder	Laid down	Launched	Commissioned	Decommissioned	Fate
SSBN-616	Lafayette	General Dynamics Electric Boat	17 January 1961	8 May 1962	23 April 1963	12 August 1991	Disposed, (Note: through the Ship-Submarine Recycling Program) 1992
SSBN-617	Alexander Hamilton	General Dynamics Electric Boat	26 June 1961	18 August 1962	27 June 1963	23 February 1993	Disposed, 1994
SSBN-619	Andrew Jackson	Mare Island Naval Shipyard	26 April 1961	15 September 1962	3 July 1963	31 August 1989	Disposed, 1999
SSBN-620	John Adams	Portsmouth Naval Shipyard	19 May 1961	12 January 1963	12 May 1964	24 March 1989	Disposed, 1996
SSBN-622	James Monroe	Newport News Shipbuilding and Drydock Co.	31 July 1961	4 August 1962	7 December 1963	25 September 1990	Disposed, 1995
SSBN-623	Nathan Hale	General Dynamics Electric Boat	2 October 1961	12 January 1963	23 November 1963	3 November 1986	Disposed, 1994
SSBN-624	Woodrow Wilson	Mare Island Naval Shipyard	13 September 1961	22 February 1963	27 December 1963	1 September 1994	Disposed, 1998
SSBN-625	Henry Clay	Newport News Shipbuilding and Drydock Co.	23 October 1961	30 November 1962	20 February 1964	5 November 1990	Disposed, 1997
SSBN-626	Daniel Webster	General Dynamics Electric Boat	28 December 1961	27 April 1963	9 April 1964	30 August 1990	Preparing for inactivation in 2026

== See also ==
- List of submarines of the United States Navy
- List of submarine classes of the United States Navy

== Bibliography ==
- Gardiner, Robert and Chumbley, Stephen (editors). Conway's All the World's Fighting Ships 1947–1995. Annapolis, USA: Naval Institute Press, 1995. ISBN 1-55750-132-7.
- Polmar, Norman. The Ships and Aircraft of the U.S. Fleet: Twelfth Edition. London:Arms and Armour Press, 1981. ISBN 0-85368-397-2.
- US Naval Vessel Register - List of SSBN BALLISTIC MISSILE SUBMARINE (NUCLEAR-POWERED) Class vessels
