= JDS Natsushio (SS-523) =

Natsushio-class submarine

- JDS Natsushio

History

Japan
- Name: Natsushio; (なつしお)
- Namesake: Natsushio (1939)
- Ordered: 1960
- Builder: Mitsubishi Heavy Industries, Kobe
- Laid down: 5 December 1961
- Launched: 18 September 1962
- Commissioned: 29 June 1963
- Decommissioned: 20 March 1978
- Identification: Pennant number: SS-523
- Fate: Scrapped

General characteristics
- Class & type: Natsushio-class submarine
- Displacement: 790 long tons (803 t) surfaced
- Length: 61 m (200 ft 2 in)
- Beam: 6.5 m (21 ft 4 in)
- Draft: 4.1 m (13 ft 5 in)
- Depth: 6.4 m (21 ft 0 in)
- Propulsion: Diesel-electric, 2 shafts; 900 bhp (670 kW) (surfaced); 2,300 shp (1,700 kW) (submerged)
- Speed: 11 knots (20 km/h; 13 mph) surfaced; 15 knots (28 km/h; 17 mph) submerged
- Complement: 40
- Armament: 3 × 533 mm (21 in) torpedo tubes

JDS Natsushio (SS-523) was the lead boat of the Natsushio-class submarines. She was commissioned on 29 June 1963.

== Construction and career ==
Natsushio was laid down at Mitsubishi Heavy Industries Kobe Shipyard on 5 December 1961 and launched on 18 September 1962. She was commissioned on 29 June 1963.

On 1 February 1965, the 1st Submarine was reorganized into the 1st Submarine Group, which was newly formed under the Self-Defense Fleet. From 8 June to 23 August of the same year, she deployed to Hawaii to participate in dispatch training with JDS Fuyushio. Along the way, on 15 July, a periscope broke in a collision with an uninhabited cargo ship in the waters south of Oahu.

The submarine was removed from the naval register on 20 March 1978.
