= JDS Fuyushio (SS-524) =

Natsushio-class submarine

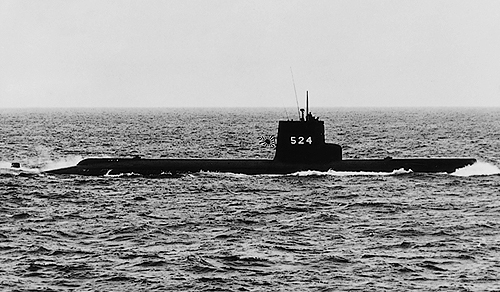
- JDS Fuyushio

History

Japan
- Name: Fuyushio; (ふゆしお)
- Ordered: 1960
- Builder: Kawasaki, Kobe
- Laid down: 6 December 1961
- Launched: 14 December 1962
- Commissioned: 17 September 1963
- Decommissioned: 10 June 1980
- Identification: Pennant number: SS-524
- Fate: Scrapped

General characteristics
- Class & type: Natsushio-class submarine
- Displacement: 790 long tons (803 t) surfaced
- Length: 61 m (200 ft 2 in)
- Beam: 6.5 m (21 ft 4 in)
- Draft: 4.1 m (13 ft 5 in)
- Depth: 6.4 m (21 ft 0 in)
- Propulsion: Diesel-electric, 2 shafts; 900 BHP (surfaced); 2,300 SHP (submerged)
- Speed: 11 knots (20 km/h; 13 mph) surfaced; 15 knots (28 km/h; 17 mph) submerged
- Complement: 40
- Armament: 3 × 533 mm (21 in) torpedo tubes

JDS Fuyushio (SS-524) was the second Natsushio-class submarine. She was commissioned on 17 September 1963.

== Construction and career ==
Fuyushio was laid down at Mitsubishi Heavy Industries Kobe Shipyard on 6 December 1961 and launched on 14 December 1962. She was commissioned on 17 September 1963.

On 1 February 1965, the 1st Submarine was reorganized into the 1st Submarine Group, which was newly formed under the Self-Defense Fleet. From 8 June to 23 August 1965, she deployed to Hawaii to participate dispatch training with JDS Natsushio.

On 23 March 1979, the 1st Submarine was abolished and became a ship under the direct control of the 1st Submarine Group.

The vessel was removed from the naval register on 10 June 1980.
