= Natsushio-class submarine =

Pair of small submarines known for their limited capabilities but successful design

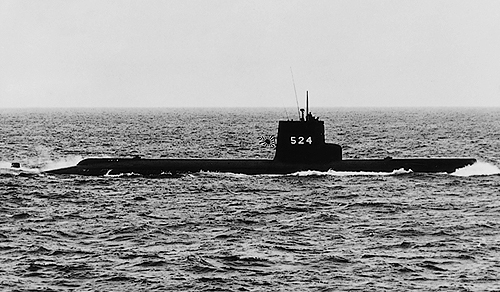
- JS Fuyushio

Class overview
- Name: Natsushio class
- Builders: New Mitsubishi Heavy Industries, Kawasaki Shipbuilding Corporation
- Operators: Japan Maritime Self-Defense Force
- Preceded by: Hayashio class
- Succeeded by: Ōshio class
- Built: 1961–1963
- In commission: 1963–1978
- Planned: 2
- Completed: 2
- Retired: 2

General characteristics
- Type: Coastal attack submarine
- Displacement: 690 long tons (701 t) surfaced
- Length: 61 m (200 ft 2 in)
- Beam: 6.5 m (21 ft 4 in)
- Draft: 4.1 m (13 ft 5 in)
- Propulsion: Sulzer-Mitsubishi Diesel-electric, 2 shafts; 1,350 bhp (1,010 kW) (surfaced); 2,300 shp (1,700 kW) (submerged)
- Speed: 12 knots (22 km/h; 14 mph) surfaced; 15 knots (28 km/h; 17 mph) submerged
- Complement: 43
- Armament: 3 × 533 mm (21 in) torpedo tubes

The Natsushio-class submarines were a pair of submarines constructed and operated by the Japan Maritime Self-Defense Force during the Cold War. They were a development of the Hayashio-class submarines and are sometimes considered the same class. Similar to its slightly earlier siblings, they were small and limited in capability, but similar to the preceding Hayashio class, were thought to be a success. They entered service in 1963–1964 and were decommissioned in 1978.

== Design and description ==
The Natsushios were a development of the preceding Hayashio class and are sometimes considered the same class. They shared many of the same characteristics with small design improvements. They were small submarines with limited capability but were considered handy and successful nonetheless. They were air-conditioned and had good habitability for their crews. The submarines measured 61 meters (200 ft 2 in) long overall with a beam of 6.5 m (21 ft 4 in) and a draft of 4.1 m (13 ft 5 in). The submarines had a standard displacement of 780 long tons (790 t), with a surfaced displacement of 690 long tons (700 t) and 850 long tons (860 t) submerged.

The vessels were powered by a diesel-electric system. Two shafts were powered by two Sulzer-Mitsubishi diesel engines creating 1,350 brake horsepower (1,010 kW) and two electric motors creating 1,700 shaft horsepower (1,300 kW). This gave the submarines a maximum speed of 12 knots (22 km/h; 14 mph) surfaced and 15 knots (28 km/h; 17 mph) submerged. (Note: Blackman and Moore have the submarines' surfaced speed as 11 knots (20 km/h; 13 mph).) The Natsushios were armed with three 533-millimeter (21 in) torpedo tubes in the bow. They had a crew of 43.

== Boats in class ==
Natsushio class construction data
Pennant no.	Name	Laid down	Launched	Commissioned	Fate
SS-523	Natsushio (なつしお)	5 December 1961	18 September 1962	29 June 1963	Deleted 20 March 1978
SS-524	Fuyushio (ふゆしお)	6 December 1961	14 December 1962	17 September 1963	Deleted 20 June 1978

== See also ==
Equivalent submarines of the same era

- Type 205
- Hajen class
- Toti class
- Aréthuse class
