= UGM-73 Poseidon =

US nuclear ballistic missile

UGM-73A Poseidon C3
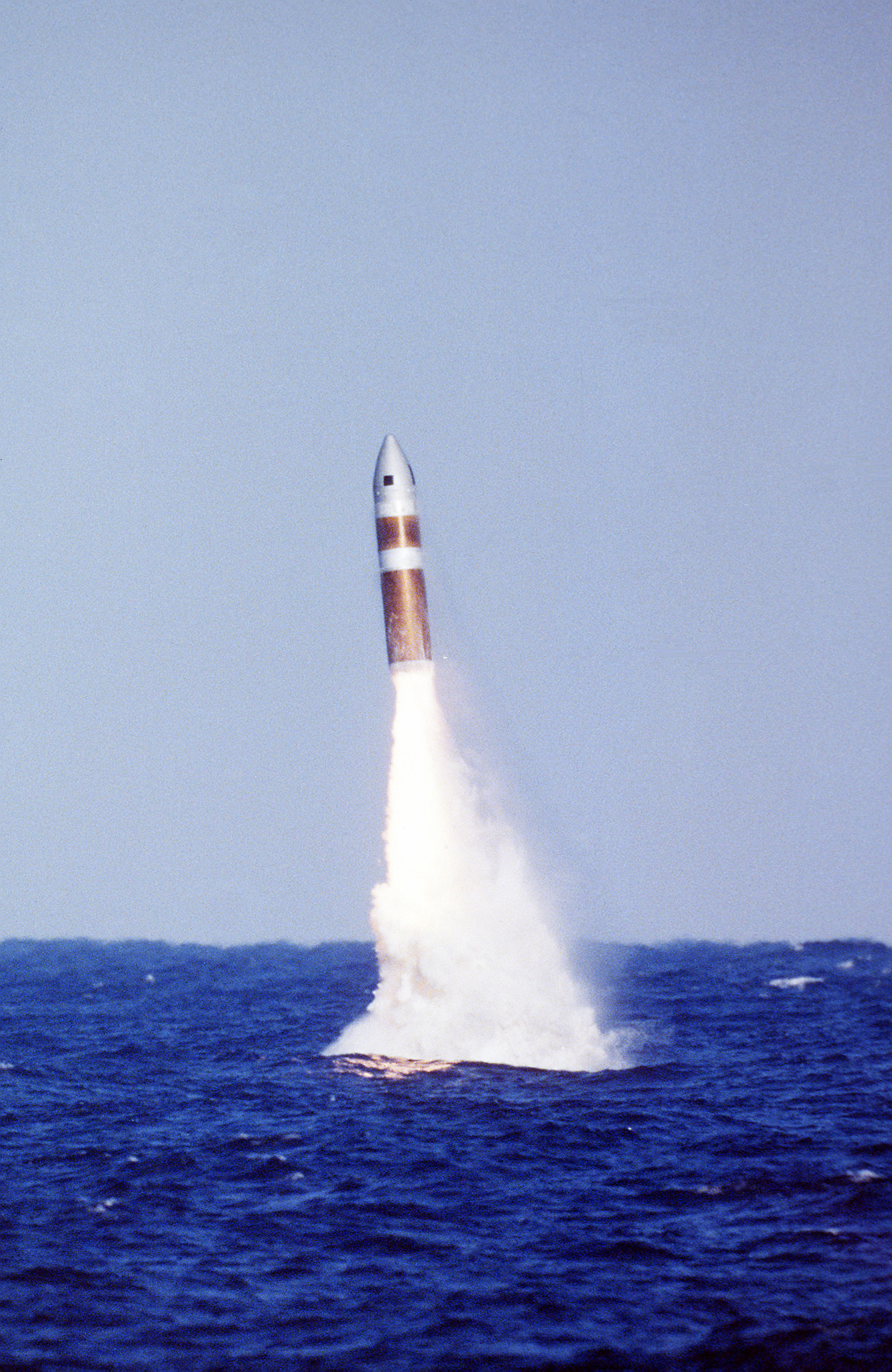
- A Poseidon missile lifts off after being launched from the submerged USS Ulysses S. Grant (SSBN-631) in May 1979
- Type: Strategic SLBM
- Place of origin: United States

Service history
- In service: 31 March 1971 to September 1992 (Trident I phased in from October 1979)
- Used by: United States Navy

Production history
- Manufacturer: Lockheed Missiles Division

Specifications
- Mass: 64,400 pounds (29,200 kg)
- Length: 34.1 feet (10.4 m)
- Diameter: 74 inches (1.9 m)
- Warhead: 10 or 14 W68 warheads in Mark 3 RVs; 40 kilotonnes of TNT (170 TJ)
- Engine: Two-stage solid-fuel rocket, each single nozzle with thrust vectoring
- Operational range: With 14 RVs: 2,500 nautical miles (4,600 km), with 10 RVs: 3,200 nautical miles (5,900 km)
- Maximum speed: 8,000 mph (13,000 km/h) (terminal phase)
- Guidance system: Inertial
- Accuracy: 0.3 nautical miles (560 m) CEP

The UGM-73 Poseidon missile was the second US Navy nuclear-armed submarine-launched ballistic missile (SLBM) system, powered by a two-stage solid-fuel rocket. It succeeded the UGM-27 Polaris beginning in 1972, bringing major advances in warheads and accuracy. It was followed by Trident I in 1979, and Trident II in 1990.

== Development ==
A development study for a longer range version of the Polaris missile—achieved by enlarging it to the maximum possible size allowed by existing launch tubes—started in 1963. Tests had already shown that Polaris missiles could be operated without problems in launch tubes that had their fiberglass liners and locating rings removed.

The project was given the title Polaris B3 in November, but the missile was eventually named Poseidon C3 to emphasize the technical advances over its predecessor. The C3 was the only version of the missile produced, and it was also given the designation UGM-73A.

Slightly longer and considerably wider and heavier than Polaris A3, Poseidon had the same 2,900-mile (4,600 km; 2,500 nmi) range, greater payload capacity, improved accuracy, and multiple independently targetable reentry vehicle (MIRV) capability. MIRV capacity has been given as up to either ten or fourteen W68 thermonuclear warheads contained in Mark 3 reentry vehicles to multiple targets.

As with Polaris, starting a rocket motor when the missile was still in the submarine was considered very dangerous. Therefore, the missile was ejected from its launch tube using high pressure steam produced by a solid-fueled boiler. The main rocket motor ignited automatically when the missile had risen approximately 30 feet (10 m) above the surface.

The first test launch took place on 16 August 1968, the first successful at-sea launch was from a surface ship, the USNS Observation Island (from July 1 to December 16, 1969), earning the ship the Meritorious Unit Commendation, and the first test launch from a submarine took place on the USS James Madison on 3 August 1970. The weapon officially entered service on 31 March 1971. It eventually equipped 31 Lafayette-, James Madison-, and Benjamin Franklin-class submarines.

The Royal Navy also considered adopting Poseidon in the 1970s as an upgrade to its Polaris A3T boats, and like the US this would have kept the existing hulls. Although the Navy's favoured option, the British government instead adopted Chevaline, a two warhead MRV system with decoys, on the existing Polaris airframes and later moved to the Trident D5 in new boats.

Beginning in 1979, 12 Poseidon-equipped SSBNs were refitted with Trident I. By 1992, the Soviet Union had collapsed, 12 Ohio-class submarines had been commissioned, and the START I treaty had gone into effect, so the 31 older Poseidon- and Trident I-armed SSBNs were disarmed, withdrawing Poseidon from service.

== Operators ==
- United States
  - United States Navy

== Gallery ==
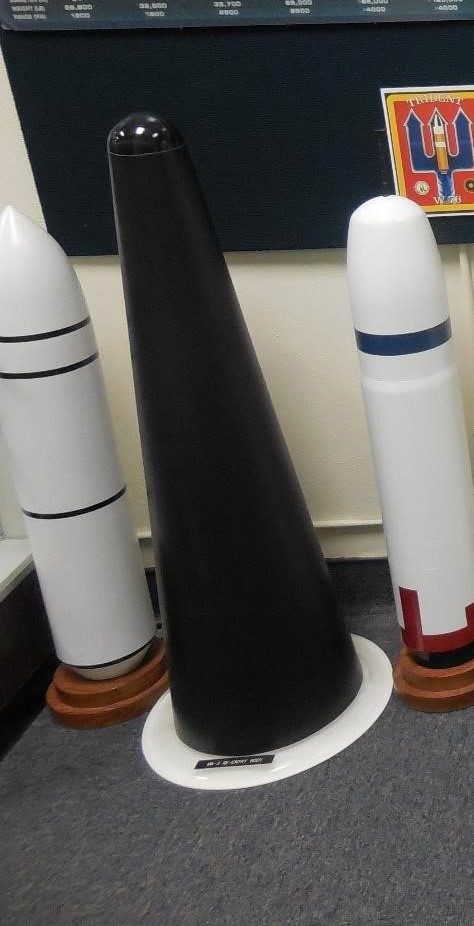
The Mark 3 Reentry Body (RB) that would contain the W68 warhead carried by Poseidon.

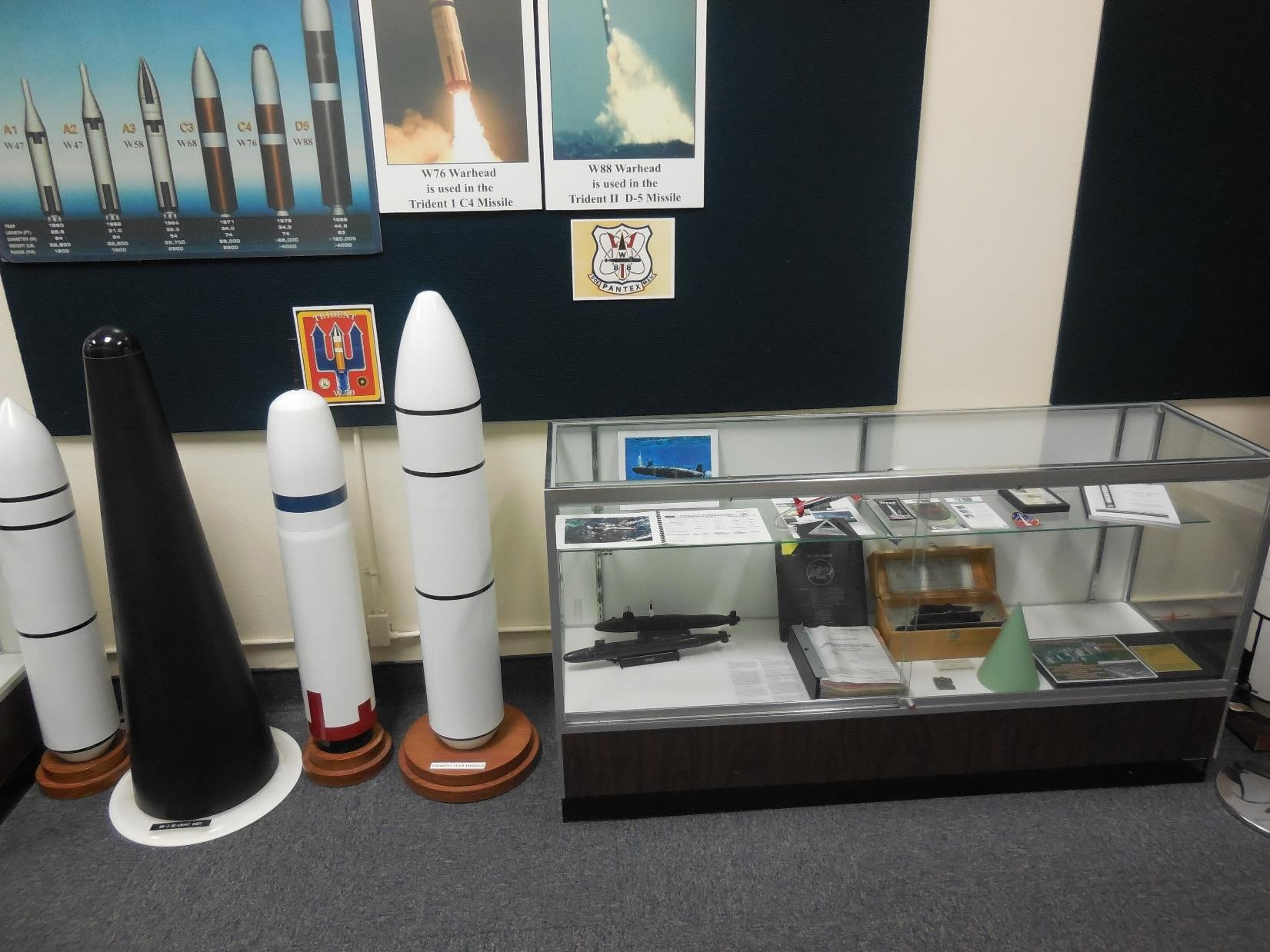
Mark 3 with objects for scale.

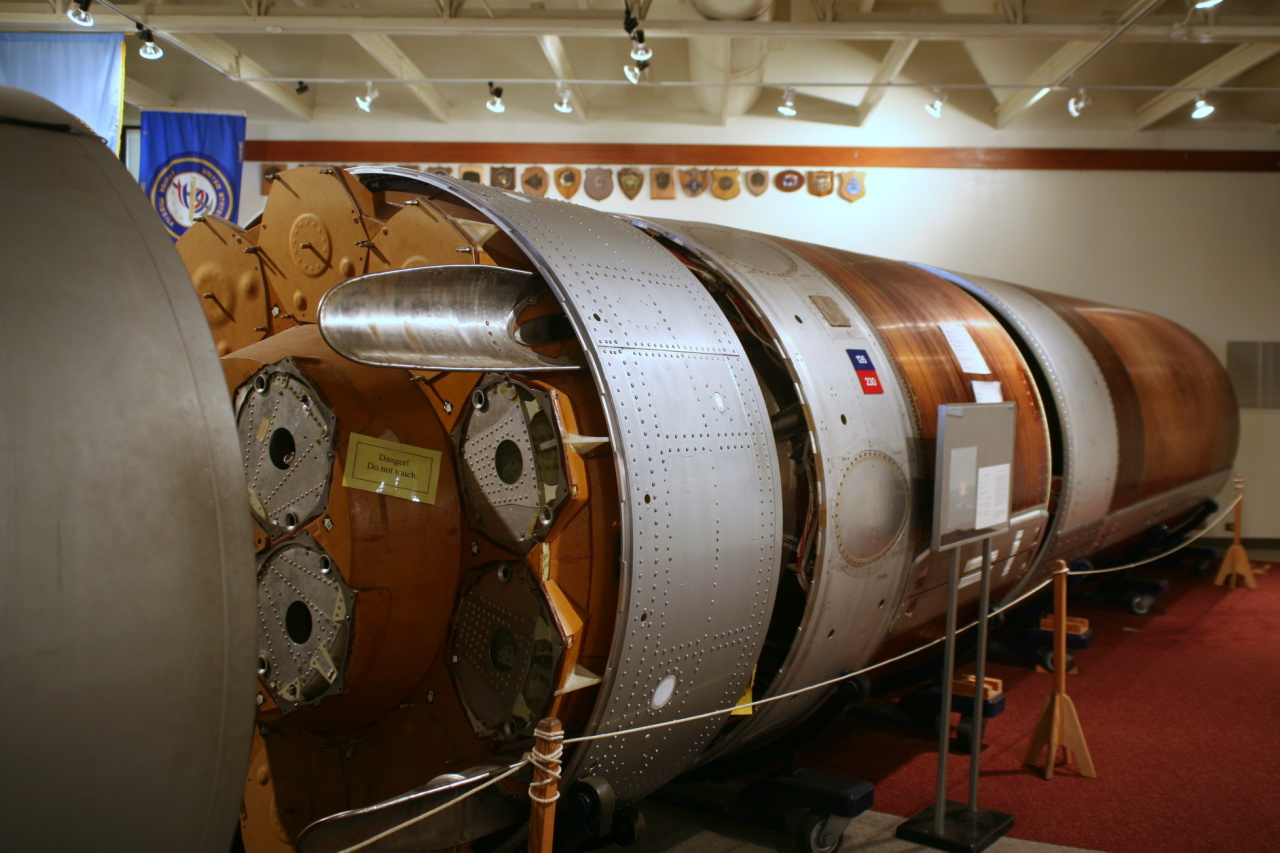
Poseidon missile on display at the USS Bowfin Submarine Museum & Park.

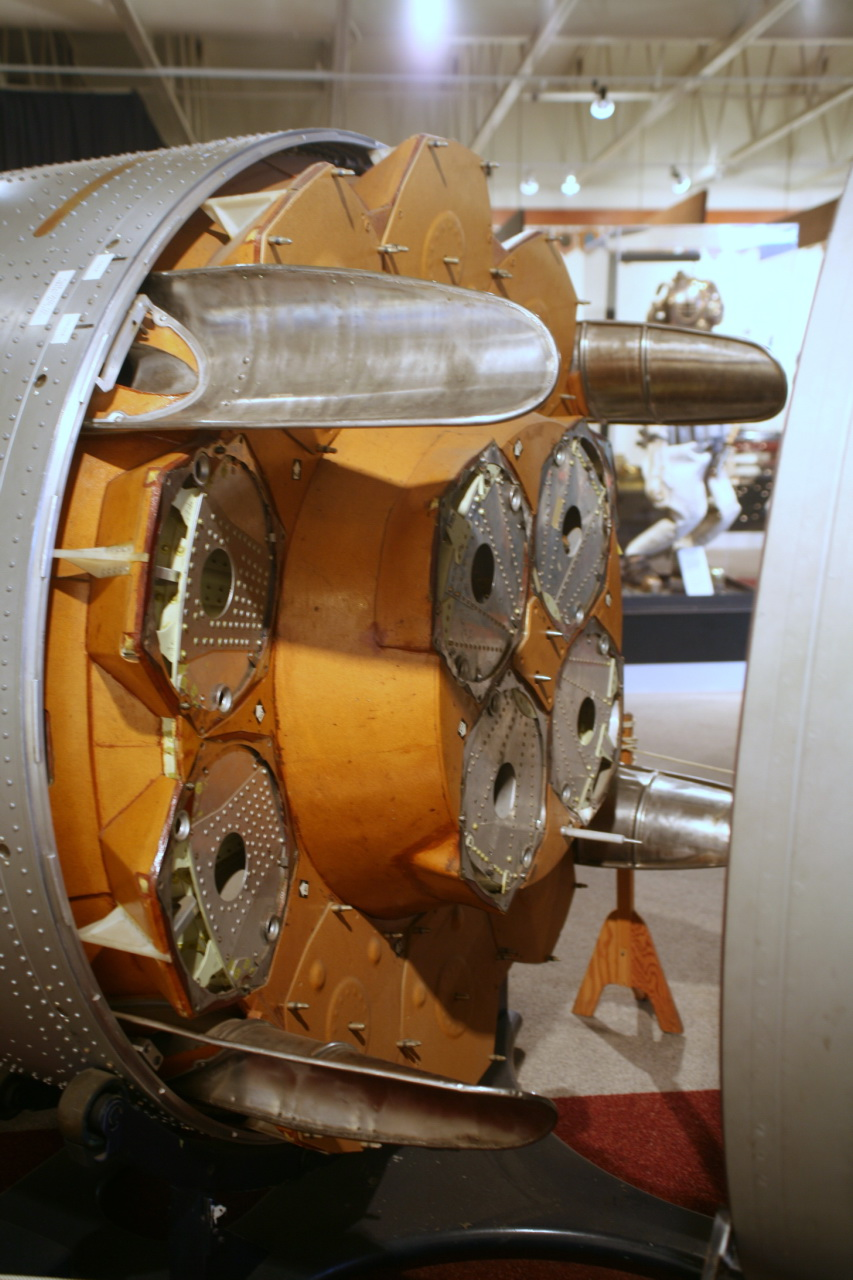
Poseidon missile post-boost vehicle (PBV) showing 14 locations for warheads though only 8 are outfitted with warhead equipment.

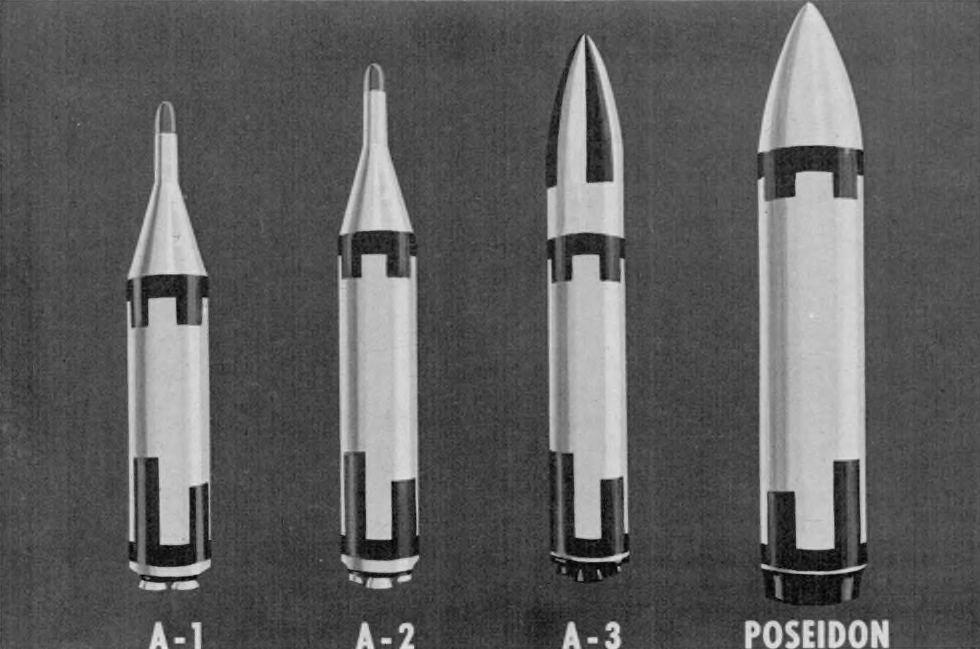
Polaris-Poseidon family of SLBMs.

== See also ==
- List of missiles
