= USS Vancouver =

U.S. Navy amphibious warfare ship

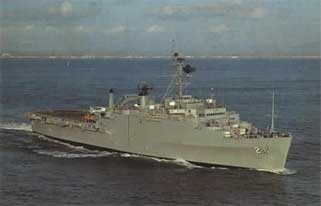
- USS Vancouver

History

United States
- Namesake: Vancouver, Washington
- Ordered: 30 December 1959
- Builder: New York Naval Shipyard
- Laid down: 19 November 1960
- Launched: 15 September 1962
- Acquired: 10 May 1963
- Commissioned: 11 May 1963
- Decommissioned: 31 March 1992
- Stricken: 8 April 1997
- Fate: Scrapped 2013

General characteristics
- Class & type: Raleigh class amphibious transport dock
- Displacement: 8,650 tons light, 14,113 tons full, 5,463 tons dead
- Length: 522 feet (159 m) extreme, 500 feet (152 m) waterline
- Beam: 100 feet (30 m) extreme, 84 feet (25.6 m) waterline
- Draft: 23 feet (7.0 m)
- Speed: 21 knots (39 km)
- Troops: 1,000
- Complement: 436
- Armament: four 3"(76 mm)/50 caliber guns

USS Vancouver (LPD-2) was a Raleigh-class amphibious transport dock, named after the city of Vancouver, Washington, which was in turn named after the famous north-west explorer George Vancouver. Vancouver's was commissioned 11 May 1963 and served during the Vietnam War and 1991 Gulf War. She was decommissioned 27 March 1992, placed in reserve and stricken 8 April 1997. Title was transferred to the United States Maritime Administration 29 November 2001. Vancouver was towed for scrapping in Brownsville, Texas, in April 2013.

== History ==
Her keel was laid down on 19 November 1960 at Brooklyn, New York by the New York Naval Shipyard. She was launched on 15 September 1962 sponsored by Mrs. Stuart Symington, and commissioned on 11 May 1963.

After completing builder's trials at New York City and shakedown training out of Norfolk, Virginia, the amphibious transport dock ship departed the latter port on 14 August and laid a course for the west coast. She transited the Panama Canal on 20 August and after making a side trip to Acapulco, Mexico, to assist a disabled fishing vessel arrived in San Diego, her permanent home port, on 31 August.

Late in September and early in October, Vancouver made the traditional visit to her namesake city, Vancouver, Washington, and then returned to San Diego for seven weeks of training. Underway training occupied the first four weeks while amphibious training took up the last three. In mid-December, she welcomed on board the newly appointed Secretary of the Navy, Paul H. Nitze, and the Commander in Chief, Pacific Fleet, Admiral U.S. Grant Sharp, Jr., as well as several other high ranking United States Navy and United States Marine Corps officers, and treated them to a display of her multifaceted amphibious capabilities.

In mid-February 1964, the ship moved from San Diego to Long Beach, California, where she entered the naval shipyard for post-shakedown availability. She finished repairs on 21 May, completed final acceptance trials early in June, and then returned to San Diego. Late in June, the amphibious transport dock ship made another voyage north to Canada for a visit to another namesake city, Vancouver, British Columbia, in time to participate in that city's annual maritime festival. On the way back home, she stopped in San Francisco, for the Independence Day weekend and then reentered San Diego on 7 July. At that point, she began her operational schedule. She participated in three amphibious warfare exercises between July and October and then began preparations for her first deployment to the Far East.

=== 1964 ===
Her first tour of duty with the Seventh Fleet coincided with the beginning of the rapid acceleration of American involvement in South Vietnam heralded by the Gulf of Tonkin incident in August 1964—generally accepted as the beginning of the Vietnam War. She departed San Diego on 16 November, loaded marines at Port Hueneme, and set out across the Pacific on 18 November. Vancouver arrived in Buckner Bay, Okinawa, on 6 December, and unloaded her passengers. Embarking another Marine battalion at Okinawa on 21 December she moved to Subic Bay in the Philippines, where she traded her second load of marines for a third which she transported to Okinawa in January 1965.

During the 1964 Christmas Holidays in Subic Bay, Vancouver had the honor of welcoming aboard the USO tour group consisting of Bob Hope, Jerry Calona, Anna Maria Alberghetti, Jill St. John and Ann Sidney (Miss World 1964).

=== 1965 to 1966 ===
After off-loading the Marines, Vancouver departed Buckner Bay, Okinawa on 15 January 1965 bound for Hong Kong for R&R. After a paint job by Mary Sue and the Girls, she left Hong Kong on 21 January, bound for Subic Bay, arriving on 23 January. She departed Subic Bay fully loaded with Marines and all their gear on 27 January for Da Nang, South Vietnam. She twice returned to Subic Bay twice without off-loading the Marines.

In February, the ship still loaded with elements of the Ninth Marine Expeditionary Brigade departed Subic Bay and took up station off Da Nang South Vietnam. She remained on station for the next 40 days. After 2 false starts she anchored in Da Nang harbor and, on 8 March in company with USS Henrico and USS Union, landed the first U.S. combat troops at Red Beach, Da Nang, South Vietnam. The Marines were to protect the perimeter of the Danang Air Base and free South Vietnamese troops for other combat duties.

She left Da Nang on 12 March, stopped over in Okinawa, departed there on 16 March and arrived in Numazu, Japan, then Yokosuka, Japan on 18 March. She spent almost 3 weeks in Yokosuka. She departed Yokosuka on 8 April, bound for Okinawa. She arrived at Okinawa on 11 April, then headed to Da Nang, South Vietnam arriving on 14 April. She moved to Huế, South Vietnam and off-loaded Marines there. On 19 April, Vancouver departed Huế for Subic Bay, arriving 20 April. She departed Subic Bay after a 2-hour stop, bound for Sydney, Australia to participate in the Battle of the Coral Sea celebration.

Vancouver crossed the equator for the first time on 24 April 1965 arriving in Sydney on 1 May. She participated in the Coral Sea celebration with open house tours of the ship. On 10 May, Vancouver departed Sydney for Melbourne, Australia arriving on 12 May. On 19 May, she left Melbourne, bound for Pago Pago, American Samoa. While in Pago Pago, three of the crew were lost in a swimming mishap caused by severe rip currents in one of the lagoons. She departed Pago Pago on 28 May and arrived in San Diego on 8 June. During her first deployment, from 18 November 1964 to 8 June 1966, Vancouver steamed 35,442 miles.

However, less than two months after her return, she embarked Marines for a special troop lift to the widening Vietnam War. She departed the west coast on 5 August 1965 and did not return until 5 October 1965. At that point, she began the normal schedule of upkeep and training exercises at San Diego and other points along the California coast.

During the first week in July, Vancouver embarked LVT-5s and Battalion Landing Team (BLT) 1/26 (1st Battalion, 26th Marines) in preparation for her second Seventh Fleet assignment. On 9 July, she put to sea and after a two-day stop at Pearl Harbor from 14 to 16 July, arrived at Subic Bay on 28 July. There, she became a unit of the newly constituted Seventh Fleet Amphibious Ready Group (ARG), Task Group (TG) 76.5—a self-contained mobile amphibious assault team made up of a Special Landing Force (SLF), marines and support units, and the ships which served as their transportation and mobile bases. In a series of training exercises held in the Philippines, the Navy-Marine Corps teammates honed their skills for an almost instant response to any need for amphibious support or reinforcement in the Seventh Fleet's zone of operations.

Quite naturally, Vietnam constituted the area most in need of such a capability at that time. Accordingly, the ARG concluded its amphibious training on 12 August, reembarked the landing force, and sailed for the waters off South Vietnam. Between 16 and 29 August 1966, Vancouver participated in her first combat action during Operation Deckhouse III which consisted of two landings at a point some 60 miles (100 km) east of Saigon. The first phase, from 16 to 20 August, saw BLT 1/26 move ashore in both waterborne and airborne modes against minor opposition and later destroy a fortified Vietcong (VC)-held village. During the second set of landings, 22 to 29 August, the Marines sent ashore changed operational control from the ARG to the authorities ashore to assist in Operation Toledo a search-and-destroy mission to deprive the VC of caches of arms and supplies. At the conclusion of "Deckhouse III", Vancouver returned to Subic Bay for ten days of upkeep.

Departing the Philippines on 12 September, the ship began her second amphibious assault, Operation Deckhouse IV, on 15 September 1966 in the vicinity of the Cua Viet River in Quảng Trị Province just south of the Vietnamese Demilitarized Zone (DMZ). The landings constituted a seaward arm of the larger Operation Prairie being conducted by American and South Vietnamese forces ashore to destroy North Vietnamese Army fortifications, bunkers, and supply caches in the area and to stem intensified infiltration across the DMZ. During their ten days ashore, the Marines of the SLF encountered heavy resistance and accounted for 254 of the enemy killed before they reembarked on 25 September. At the conclusion of the operation, Vancouver disembarked her portion of BLT 1/26 troops at Da Nang and headed for Okinawa.

After she embarked BLT 3rd Battalion, 3rd Marines there, she returned to Vietnamese waters on 6 October and steamed with the contingency force in the area off the DMZ for the next 22 days. On 28 October, she disembarked BLT 3/3 and, two days later, embarked BLT 3rd Battalion, 26th Marines for transportation to the Philippines. She departed Da Nang on 1 November and arrived in Subic Bay on 12 November. During December, she participated in an amphibious exercise, "Mudpuppy II", at Mindoro and conducted upkeep at Subic Bay. On 30 November, the amphibious transport dock ship got underway for Vietnamese waters and arrived near Vũng Tàu the following day.

=== 1967 ===
There, near the entrance to the Saigon River, she began another amphibious operation in the "Deckhouse" series, Operation Deckhouse V, on 4 January 1967. It lasted until 15 January and was a joint United States – South Vietnamese effort utilizing Marines of both nations. Vancouver embarked more than 500 South Vietnamese Marines at Vũng Tàu on 4 January and, after a two-day delay caused by bad weather, sent her binational force ashore on 6 January by both assault craft and helicopter. In spite of continued bad weather and her first experience with riverine operations, the ship and her boats remained in the area for ten days, providing the necessary logistics support for the SLF operating ashore. After reembarking the SLF and South Vietnamese Marines on 15 January and then disembarking the latter again at Vũng Tàu the following day, she departed Vietnam to return to the Philippines.

The ship arrived at Subic Bay on 19 January, but remained only two days before continuing on to Okinawa where she exchanged BLT 1/9 for BLT 1st Battalion, 4th Marines late in January. Following a visit to Keelung Taiwan where she couldn't get into the harbor due to an impending typhoon, she returned to the Philippines early in February and conducted an amphibious exercise, "Mudpuppy III", with the Marines of BLT 1/4. Another brief rest and relaxation period at Subic Bay at the end of the first week in February preceded her departure from the Philippines on 12 February. Vancouver resumed duty with the ARG on 14 February and, two days later, began her part in Operation Deckhouse VI, another two-phase amphibious assault in support of operations of wider scope being conducted ashore.

At the conclusion of Operation Deckhouse VI, the amphibious transport dock ship visited Subic Bay; Hong Kong; Okinawa, and Yokosuka, Japan, before departing the latter port on 24 March to return home to San Diego. After a three-day stop at Pearl Harbor at the end of the month, she arrived in San Diego on 8 April.

Following an unusually long period in port at San Diego, Vancouver resumed operations along the west coast in July. In addition to single-ship underway training, she revisited Vancouver, British Columbia, in July to participate in a Fleet Assembly as part of the Canadian Centennial Celebration. Late that month, the ship resumed local operations which included underway training and amphibious refresher training. That employment occupied her for the remainder of the year and the first month of 1968.

=== 1968 ===
On 1 February 1968, the ship departed San Diego bound for Okinawa to begin another tour of duty with the Seventh Fleet. She stopped at Pearl Harbor from 8 to 10 February and, after being diverted from Okinawa on 12 February, arrived in Da Nang on 23 February to disembark her marines, urgently needed to stem the 1968 Tet Offensive. The following day, Vancouver got underway for Subic Bay where she arrived on 26 February. On 27 February, she changed operational control to TG 76.5 and became part of the Seventh Fleet ARG once more. On 29 February, the ship steamed out of Subic Bay for the Cửa Việt River area of Vietnam where she began supporting the SLF, operating ashore since late January. While continuing that mission, she put into Da Nang on 10 March and spent the next two weeks repairing boats as well. In April, she steamed around off the DMZ providing support for BLT 3rd Battalion, 1st Marines until 10 April, when she headed back to the Philippines.

Vancouver arrived in Subic Bay on 15 April and remained there until 26 April at which time she got underway to return to Vietnamese waters. The ship arrived on station near the mouth of the Cua Viet River and began providing logistics support to elements of BLT 3/1 committed to defensive positions in the vicinity of Cửa Việt Base and Đông Hà Combat Base. That duty lasted until 3 June, when she reembarked the SLF.

On 6 June, Vancouver began a combat operation, code named Operation Swift Sabre. The SLF moved ashore in two groups. One group assaulted beaches in landing craft while the other group flew well inland in helicopters. Both groups then began moving toward one another in a sweep of Elephant Valley in Thừa Thiên Province to eliminate a frequent source of hostile mortar fire on the Da Nang Air Base. After supporting the Marines for a week, Vancouver received a replacement SLF, BLT 2nd Battalion, 7th Marines, when BLT 3/1 changed operational control to military authorities ashore. The new battalion landing team came on board on 14 and 15 June, and Vancouver set a course for the Philippines on 15 June. She entered Subic Bay on 18 June and began a ten-day upkeep period. Between 30 June and 3 July, the ship participated in the amphibious exercise "Hilltop XX" and then departed Subic Bay on 6 July for her last tour of duty in Vietnamese waters during the 1968 deployment.

Immediately upon her arrival off Vietnam, she began preparations for the amphibious operation, Operation Eager Yankee. In the predawn of 9 July, destroyers USS Benner and USS O'Brien began the prelanding bombardment, Vancouver, as primary control ship for the boat phase of the assault, began shuttling Marines ashore some ten miles east of Phu Bai Combat Base The first elements of BLT 2/7 went ashore in LVTs and began establishing defensive positions and clearing landing zones for the airborne phase of the operation. The ship remained in the area providing logistics support for the Marines as they drove northwest toward a known VC haven. After a week without contacting the enemy, Vancouver's landing force joined shore-based units in Operation Houston IV while the ship continued in her support role. The second operation ended on 22 July, and the marines reembarked that same day.

However, they did not remain on board for long because, on the following day, Operation Swift Play began. In that operation, an all-helicopter affair, the Marines landed well inland about ten miles southwest of Hội An in east central Quảng Nam Province. They failed to contact the enemy during the helicopter assault and, the following day, changed operational control to authorities ashore while Vancouver played her usual support role. She remained in the vicinity until 19 August at which time she headed back to Subic Bay without her Marine contingent.

The warship arrived in Subic Bay on 21 August and spent the next six days engaged in turnover operations with her relief, USS Ogden (LPD-6). On 27 August, she put to sea bound for Hong Kong where she arrived on 29 August. After a five-day rest and relaxation period, she departed Hong Kong for Okinawa. Diverted to Subic Bay by a typhoon, she continued her voyage via the San Bernardino Strait and finally arrived at Okinawa on 9 September. The following day, she set sail for Yokosuka, Japan, where she arrived on 12 September for five days of upkeep.

On 17 September, Vancouver began her voyage home. She reentered San Diego on 28 September and, after a month of post-deployment standdown, resumed local operations along the California coast.

=== 1969 ===
That employment lasted until early in February 1969 when she began the first portion of her regular overhaul at San Francisco. That phase of the task was completed in mid-April and, after a brief return to San Diego, the ship entered the Long Beach Naval Shipyard for drydocking. The refurbishing was finished near the end of May, and Vancouver returned to San Diego on 28 February. Following two months of inspections and refresher training, the ship loaded vehicles and cargo at San Diego and got underway for the Western Pacific on 1 August. She made a three-day stop at Pearl Harbor from 8 to 11 August; then resumed her voyage and arrived at Okinawa on 21 August. After unloading cargo at Buckner Bay, she got underway for Vietnam on 24 August. Upon arriving at Tau My, South Vietnam on 27 August, Vancouver unloaded cargo there and at Da Nang before departing Vietnam that same day.

On 29 August, she arrived in Subic Bay and began turnover operations to relieve USS Paul Revere of duty with ARG Bravo (TG 76.5). A week later, on 6 September, she put to sea with TG 76.5 for her first line tour with the amphibious ready group. She arrived off Da Nang two days later and entered the harbor on 10 September to unload more cargo. On 12 September, she and her group participated in Operation Defiant Stand by staging an amphibious feint about ten miles south of the actual landing beaches to draw off defenders while ARG Alfa stormed ashore. The task group completed its deception early that morning and headed back out to sea to steam around until needed again. That routine, punctuated by brief visits to Da Nang and a series of amphibious and other exercises, occupied her until late October.

On 20 October, Vancouver began a new phase in her participation in the Vietnam War. Operation Defiant Stand had been the last amphibious operation of the war. On the heels of President of the United States Richard Nixon's announcement of the staged withdrawal of large numbers of American troops from the war, the amphibious ready group began carrying out the withdrawal. On 20 October, Vancouver moved from Da Nang to Cửa Việt Base and began loading elements of BLT 1/4. She completed Operation Keystone Cardinal on 22 October and set course for Okinawa the following day. She disembarked the Marines at Okinawa on 25 and 26 October but remained at the island for liberty until 2 November. After embarking BLT 1/9, she headed for Subic Bay where she disembarked the marines on 4 November.

Following a week of repairs at Subic Bay, she reembarked BLT 1/9 on 12 November, conducted an amphibious assault exercise on 13 November, and got underway for Vietnam on 14 November. The new line period, unlike those before, consisted entirely of steaming well off the coast outside the territorial waters of Vietnam in order that the amphibious ready group's presence not be construed as a violation of President Nixon's troop reduction in Vietnam. She continued steaming in the new operating area until 23 November at which time she retired toward the Philippines. She entered Subic Bay on 27 November. Another practice landing in the Philippines followed on 1 December and Vancouver repaired storm damage sustained during the transit from Vietnam to the Philippines.

=== 1970 to 1971 ===
On 6 December, the ship once more got underway for the coast of Vietnam. She arrived off Da Nang on 9 December; but, four days later, she left the combat zone for visits to Hong Kong, Taiwan, and Okinawa. Vancouver returned to the Vietnamese coast on 31 December 1969. 1 January 1970, however, brought her departure from the area on her way back to the Philippines. She entered Subic Bay on 11 January and remained in the Philippines until 20 January when she started a round-trip voyage to Okinawa. The ship returned to Subic Bay on 27 January and remained in the area until 4 February when she headed for Taiwan. After a patrol of the Taiwan Strait, she entered port at Kaohsiung, Taiwan, for a four-day visit. She returned to Subic Bay on 21 February and began turnover operations with her relief ship Denver. On 4 March, she departed Subic Bay for Okinawa where she delivered cargo on 6 March. Continuing her voyage on 7 March, she stopped at Da Nang on 11 March, unloaded cargo, and headed back to Okinawa where she refueled on 14 March before continuing on toward the United States.

Vancouver arrived in Del March, California, on 27 March and, the following day, moved to the San Diego Naval Station for drydocking and repairs. Repairs were completed early in June, and the ship departed San Diego on 10 June with United States Naval Academy midshipmen embarked for their summer cruise. She arrived in Yokosuka on 24 June and departed again on 29 June. The ship visited [Hong Kong between 4 and 8 July and stopped at Da Nang on 9 and 10 July to load cargo bound for the United States. On the way back home, she stopped at Pearl Harbor from 24 to 27 July and then reentered San Diego on 1 August. Local operations out of San Diego, including LVT training and amphibious refresher training, occupied the ship's time through the end of the year and for the first three months of 1971.

On 30 March, Vancouver put to sea to return to the Western Pacific. She made a two-day stop at Pearl Harbor at the end of the first week in April and arrived in Subic Bay on 19 April. The ensuing six weeks brought amphibious training and port visits to Singapore and Kaohsiung. In June, the ship carried cargo from Vũng Tàu and Da Nang in the Vietnam to Subic Bay and Okinawa. Early in July, Vancouver participated in an amphibious exercise at Zambales and then departed the Philippines on 19 April for a week at Hong Kong. On 28 July, the ship returned to the Philippines at Mindoro for more amphibious exercises. August brought voyages to Sasebo, Japan, and Kaohsiung, Taiwan and, early in September, she returned to the Philippines for another round of practice landings at Zambales.

On 9 September, Vancouver left Subic Bay to pick up cargo in Vietnam. She stopped at Da Nang, Qui Nhơn, and Cam Ranh Bay before returning to Subic Bay on 17 September. On 25 September, she embarked upon a roundtrip voyage to Okinawa and returned to Subic Bay on 9 October. On 14 October, Vancouver set out on her voyage back to the United States, stopping en route at Okinawa and Pearl Harbor before arriving back in San Diego on 5 November 1971.

=== 1972 to 1974 ===
The amphibious transport dock ship remained in San Diego through the end of 1971 for post-deployment standdown and for the usual holiday leave and upkeep period. On 11 January 1972, Vancouver began local operations along the California coast. That duty lasted until 10 June, when she embarked midshipmen for the annual training cruise and got underway for the Far East. During the midshipman cruise, the ship made a visit to Yokosuka, Japan, and two each to Hong Kong and Subic Bay in the Philippines. Late in July, she headed back to the west coast, arriving at San Diego on 4 August. There, on 21 August, Vancouver began her regularly scheduled overhaul.

The ship completed post-overhaul sea trials early in February 1973 and conducted type and refresher training until mid-March. On 17 March, Vancouver again deployed to the Western Pacific. She arrived in Sasebo, Japan, on 4 April then continued her voyage on 5 April. She briefly stopped at Okinawa on 6 April and arrived in Subic Bay on 8 April.

On 9 April, she relieved Cleveland as one of the support ships for Operation End Sweep, the clearing of American naval mines in the harbors of North Vietnam as a result of the withdrawal of American forces from the Vietnam War. During April, May, and June 1973, the amphibious transport dock ship alternated tours of duty in Vietnamese waters in support of the minesweeping forces with liberty and upkeep periods in Philippine ports. She also made periodic liberty calls at Hong Kong and at various Japanese ports.

The ship completed her last tour of duty in Vietnamese waters on 18 July and headed back to the Philippines, arriving in Subic Bay on 20 July. For her remaining two months in the Far East, Vancouver visited Hong Kong, the Japanese ports Numazu, Kagoshima, and Iwakuni. She returned to the Philippines early in September, whence she put to sea on 19 September to return home. After stopping overnight at Pearl Harbor on 2 and 3 October, the ship continued on to San Diego where she arrived on 9 October 1973 and began a year of operations along the California coast. Her tasks included: helicopter qualifications, landing craft training, and full scale amphibious warfare exercises.

On 18 October 1974, she concluded her west coast schedule and got underway for the Western Pacific. She stopped at Pearl Harbor on 25 and 26 October and continuing her voyage on 26 October, arrived in Buckner Bay, Okinawa, on 9 November 1974. Though assigned to ARG Alfa as relief for USS Ogden, Vancouver began her first real peacetime deployment to the Far East in more than a decade. For the next six months, she spent most of her time alternating between Okinawa and the Philippines conducting a series of amphibious exercises and transporting marines and cargo.

=== 1975 to 1976 ===
Having received orders on 13 February 1975 to proceed to rendezvous with ARG Alfa (TG 76.4) Vancouver consequently cancelled a port visit to Manila and a scheduled Convoy exercise and stood out, bound for the Gulf of Thailand. After operating in those waters (17–24 February), Vancouver and her consorts returned to Subic Bay on account of worsening weather on 25 February. In-port maintenance for ships and embarked aircraft ensued until 1 March at which time ARG Alfa sailed to return to the Gulf, to prepare for Operation Eagle Pull, the evacuation of Cambodia. TG 76.4 conducted training and preparations (5 March-12 April), punctuating those evolutions with swim calls on 20, 22, and 30 March to permit her crew to enjoy some relaxation.

Eagle Pull commenced on 12 April 1975, with Vancouver utilizing helicopters and deploying marines from BLT 2/4 to conduct the evacuation. "Due to the length of [the] preparations," her chronicler writes, "most of the evacuees were to be airlifted to Thailand and only a handful were actually evacuated during Eagle Pull," with USS Okinawa embarking the evacuees. TG 76.4 proceeded north upon completion of the operation, and disembarked the evacuees at Sattahip, Thailand. The ships then returned to Subic Bay on 17 April, greeted upon arrival by Admiral Maurice F. Weisner, Commander in Chief, Pacific Fleet.

The deterioration of affairs in South Vietnam, however, dictated a quick return to those waters. Vancouver and the rest of TG 76.4 sped out of Subic Bay on 18 April 1975, and headed for the coast of South Vietnam, rendezvousing with TG 76.3 -- carriers USS Enterprise and USS Midway and the guided missile light cruiser USS Oklahoma City, the flagship for Vice Admiral George P. Steele, Commander, 7th Fleet—on 23 April. Five days later, Vancouver—placed on one-hour alert and detached for the purpose—proceeded to the mouth of the Batak River to serve as flight deck and wet well for refugees. During her time in those waters, the ship recovered six Air America helicopters, and later transferred the 123 evacuees via the ship's embarked LCM-8s to the Military Sealift Command ship SS Pioneer Contender. Winding up those evolutions off the mouth of the Batak on 28 April, Vancouver proceeded north to rejoin TG 76.4.

The following day, 29 April 1975, Operation Frequent Wind, the evacuation of South Vietnam, began, Vancouver reprising her operations during Eagle Pull, utilizing her embarked helicopters and marines. "Operations lasted all day and through the night with helicopters full of evacuees landing on any flight deck they could find clear," an observer on board wrote later, "Not only U.S. helos but South Vietnamese ... shuttling refugees out to U.S. ships for future transfer to MSC ships. Plans and preparations made for Eagle Pull came in handy in Operation Frequent Wind. During the evacuation, Vancouver processed over 2,200 refugees." The evolutions over on 1 May, the amphibious ship, along with TG 76.4, steamed to Subic Bay, arriving on 3 May.

At the end of the deployment, she departed Okinawa on 20 May 1975 and arrived back in San Diego on 6 June, and resumed west coast operations almost immediately with type training and a weapons inspection. Similar duty occupied her through the end of that year and during the first nine months of 1976. On 25 September 1976, she headed back to the western Pacific once more. She made a three-day stop at Pearl Harbor at the beginning of October and put in at Kwajalein Atoll on the 10th for ARG commanding officers to conduct turnover briefings. From Kwajalein, she continued her voyage to Broad Sound, Australia, where she arrived on 21 October. There, she conducted a rehearsal landing in preparation for the Operation Kangaroo II landing exercises conducted between 24 and 29 October in conjunction with Australian military and naval forces. At the conclusion of Kangaroo II, Vancouver made a five-day visit to Sydney, Australia, and then got underway for Okinawa. She reached her destination on 20 November, disembarked one group of marines, and took on another. The following day, she headed for Subic Bay, arriving there on 24 November to begin a three-week availability. Late in December, Vancouver embarked upon a voyage to Taiwan and Hong Kong observing New Year's Eve at the latter port.

=== 1977 to 1978 ===
After a return to Okinawa and Subic Bay early in January 1977, the ship visited Singapore during the latter half of the month. She returned to the Philippines on 11 February and conducted exercises in the vicinity of Subic Bay until mid March. On 16 March, the amphibious transport dock ship put to sea, bound for Inchon, Korea. During the latter part of March and early part of April, she participated in amphibious training with units of the South Korean military. On 12 April, she stopped at Okinawa and the next day headed back to the Philippines. Vancouver arrived in Subic Bay on 16 April but departed again on 28 April for a round-about voyage home. She made stops at Okinawa, Eniwetok, and Pearl Harbor before arriving back in San Diego on 21 May. After a month of post deployment standdown, the ship entered the Bethlehem Steel Co. shipyard at San Pedro, Los Angeles, for her regular overhaul. She remained there into 1978.

Vancouver completed her overhaul satisfactorily on 18 April 1978. A rigorous period of refresher training out of San Diego followed in preparation for the ship's forthcoming deployment to the Western Pacific. Vancouver departed from San Diego on 31 August and spent the remainder of the year in operations with the Seventh Fleet. Her schedule took her to Eniwetok, Marshall Islands; Subic Bay, Philippines; Pusan, Korea, and Hong Kong.

=== 1980 ===
Vancouver received the Navy Expeditionary Medal for 8 August 1980 to 11 October 1980 for service in relating to Iran and / or in the Indian Ocean. Commenced her 13th deployment leaving San Diego, Ca on 24 May 1980 operating in the Western Pacific and Indian Ocean during the Iranian Hostage Crisis and participating in five major amphibious operations with embarked Marines. Port calls included Hawaii, the Philippines, Perth Australia, and Mombasa Kenya while crossing the equator. Returned to San Diego on 22 November 1980.

=== 1990 to 1991 ===
During the 1990/1991 Gulf War, Vancouver was assigned to ARG 3 embarking the Marine Fifth Expeditionary Brigade. Vancouver departed with the 13 ship ARG, 1 December 1990 and arrived in the North Arabian Sea 12 January 1991. The group conducted landing drills and although Vancouver was stationed off the coast of Kuwait during its liberation, the Amphibious Marines aboard were deployed into Saudi Arabia and further supported the 2nd Marine Division during ground combat to retake Kuwait. After departing from the Persian Gulf, Vancouver provided support to the people of the Philippines after the volcanic activity from Mt. Pinatubo in April 1991. In May 1991, Vancouver provided support during relief operations in the aftermath of the 1991 Bangladesh cyclone. Vancouver returned to San Diego, via Pearl Harbor, in June 1991.

== Fate ==
Vancouver was decommissioned 27 March 1992 and mothballed in reserve status at Pearl Harbor until she was transferred to the National Defense Reserve Fleet, Benicia, California. Sold for scrapping 21 February 2013. She was relocated to the Mare Island Shipyard (former Mare Island Naval Shipyard) for dismantling preparation on 21 February 2013. She moved into dry dock on 8 March 2013. She was towed to Brownsville, Texas in March and April 2013 for scrapping. As of May 2013, she was being recycled at EMR's International Shipbreaking Ltd. in Brownsville, Texas.

== Awards and honors ==
Vancouver earned 11 battle stars for service in the Vietnam War. Vancouver also received a number of unit awards.

- Armed Forces Expeditionary Medal for 9 February 1965 to 13 March 1965, Vietnam
- Armed Forces Expeditionary Medal for 13 April 1965 to 18 April 1965, Vietnam
- Gallantry Cross Medal Color with Palm for 10 time periods from March 1965 to August 1968
- Vietnam Service Medal for 30 time periods from August 1965 to July 1972
- Armed Forces Expeditionary Medal for 11 April 1975 to 13 April 1975, Operation Eagle Pull
- Humanitarian Service Medal for 12 April 1975, Operation Eagle Pull
- Meritorious Unit Commendation 12 April 1975, Operation Eagle Pull
- Humanitarian Service Medal for 29 April 1975 to 30 April 1975, Operation Frequent Wind
- Armed Forces Expeditionary Medal for 29 April 1975 to 30 April 1975, Operation Frequent Wind
- Navy Unit Commendation for 29 April 1975 to 30 April 1975, Operation Frequent Wind
- Navy "E" Ribbon for 1 July 1976 to 30 June 1977
- Navy Expeditionary Medal for 8 August 1980 to 11 October 1980, Iran/Indian Ocean (21 Nov 79 - 20 Oct 81)
- Navy Unit Commendation for 1 August 1990 to 30 Apr 1991, Gulf War
- Southwest Asia Service Medal for 12 January 1991 to 8 May 1991, Gulf War
- Joint Meritorious Unit Award for 10 May 1991 to 13 June 1991, 1991 Bangladesh cyclone
