= USS Union (AKA-106) =

Tolland class attack cargo ship of the United States Navy

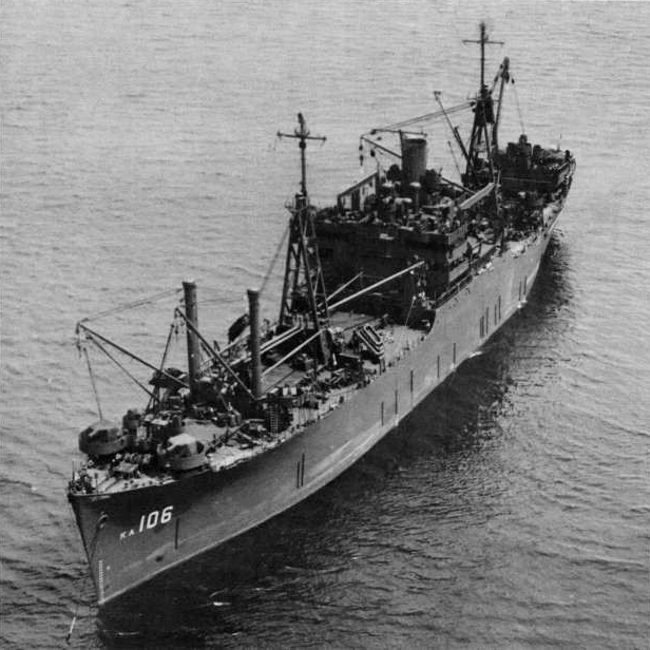
- USS Union (AKA-106)

History

United States
- Name: USS Union
- Namesake: Union County, Arkansas; Union County, Florida; Union County, Georgia; Union County, Illinois; Union County, Indiana; Union County, Iowa; Union County, Kentucky; Union County, Mississippi; Union County, New Jersey; Union County, New Mexico; Union County, North Carolina; Union County, Ohio; Union County, Oregon; Union County, Pennsylvania; Union County, South Carolina; Union County, South Dakota; Union County, Tennessee; Union Parish, Louisiana
- Builder: North Carolina Shipbuilding Company, Wilmington, North Carolina
- Laid down: 27 September 1944
- Launched: 23 November 1944
- Commissioned: 25 April 1945
- Decommissioned: 5 June 1970
- Reclassified: LKA-106, 1 January 1969
- Stricken: 1 September 1976
- Honors and awards: 2 battle stars (Korea); 6 campaign stars (Vietnam)
- Fate: Sold for scrap, September 1977

General characteristics
- Class & type: Tolland-class attack cargo ship
- Displacement: 6,433 long tons (6,536 t)
- Length: 459 ft 2 in (139.95 m)
- Beam: 63 ft (19 m)
- Draft: 26 ft 4 in (8.03 m)
- Propulsion: GE geared turbine drive; Single propeller; 6,000 shp (4.5 MW)
- Speed: 16.5 knots (30.6 km/h; 19.0 mph)
- Complement: 387
- Armament: 1 × 5"/38 caliber gun; 4 × twin 40 mm guns; 16 × 20 mm guns

USS Union (AKA-106) was a Tolland-class attack cargo ship of the United States Navy, the fourth ship of her name. She served in World War II, the Korean War and the Vietnam War.

== Construction and career ==
She was laid down as a Type C2-S-AJ3 ship named North Carolina (MC 1697) on 27 September 1944 by the North Carolina Shipbuilding Company, Wilmington, North Carolina; launched on 23 November 1944 and renamed Union at the time of launching; sponsored by Mrs. William Olive Burgin; moved to the Bethlehem Shipbuilding Co. at Hoboken, N.J., to undergo conversion into an attack transport for use by the United States Navy; and commissioned on 25 April 1945.

=== World War II and afterwards, 1945 ===
After provisioning and receiving ammunition on 6 May, Union proceeded to Norfolk, Virginia, for shakedown training. She returned to the Norfolk Navy Yard on 15 May for availability and loading before departing for Pearl Harbor. On 27 May, the ship left Norfolk for the Canal Zone and arrived at Hawaii on 18 June 1945. After unloading her cargo and undergoing availability for repairs, Union left Honolulu on 16 July en route to Eniwetok and Guam. Stopping briefly at Eniwetok on 24 July, Union proceeded to Guam where she arrived on 2 August 1945.

The ship received orders to transport cargo to Leyte in the Philippines and got underway on 20 August. Upon arrival, she was directed to unload and proceed at once to Cebu where she loaded and transported units of the Americal Division to Japan as part of Transport Squadron (TransRon) 13, consisting of some 22 ships. The group steamed into Yokohama harbor on 8 September, and she unloaded her cargo and the Army personnel. Two days later, Union got underway for a turnaround trip to the Philippines. She was diverted to Okinawa to pick up repatriated prisoners of war for Guam where she arrived on 16 September. Union remained at Guam through 2 October when she set course for Qingdao, China, to transport marines for occupation duty.

On 24 October 1945, Union anchored at Manila, then made a round trip to Subic Bay with Leo (AKA-60) to pick up landing craft replacements for the entire squadron. The ship departed Manila Bay on 30 October for Haiphong, French Indochina, to embark elements of the 52nd Chinese Nationalist Army for transportation to Qinhuangdao, North China. Having disembarked the troops and equipment on 12 November, Union proceeded to Taku, China, and remained there until she received orders on 1 December. The following day, she set course for Manila Bay, Philippines, thence to San Pedro, Los Angeles, via Pearl Harbor. She arrived in California on 29 December.

=== 1946–1950 ===
Union operated out of San Diego conducting local operations between periods of upkeep. Caught in the tremendous postwar personnel turnover, Union sometimes operated with less than 50 men on board. In early September 1946, she was called upon to transport typhoon relief supplies to Guam. Some ports visited were Pearl Harbor; Guam; Saipan; Samar Island, Philippines; Qingdao, and Taku, China. Her amphibious expertise contributed to her success during Operation "Shaft Alley" in Samar and also in resupplying marines at Guam and Beijing. Christmas morning of 1946 found Union anchored off Taku Bar where she celebrated the New Year.

Throughout January and February 1947, Union conducted operations at Samar Island, Philippines; Qingdao, China; and Guam. On 23 February, she departed Samar for San Diego via Pearl Harbor. The ship arrived at San Diego on 22 March, then sailed to the Puget Sound Naval Shipyard for a scheduled overhaul. On 14 May, the ship departed Puget Sound for San Diego via San Francisco and began preparing for "Barex-47," the 1947 Point Barrow supply expedition. After loading at Port Hueneme, Union and Muliphen (AKA-61) departed for Seattle on 7 July. On 30 July, the expedition left Seattle for the purpose of delivering supplies to agencies north of the Arctic Circle. After unloading at Point Barrow and Wainwright, Alaska, she loaded empty oil drums and old ammunition at Kodiak, Alaska, and delivered her cargo to Seattle on 24 August.

Personnel shortages throughout the Navy necessitated the ship's restricted mobility status for about eight months after she returned to San Diego on 6 September 1947. During the summer of 1948, Union repeated the Point Barrow resupply trip. On 26 July 1948, "Barex-48" got underway from Seattle. Union returned to San Diego on 24 August and finished out the year conducting local operations, which included Operations "Satanic" and "Demon."

On 10 January 1949, Union departed San Diego for "Microex-49," a cold weather amphibious operation off Kodiak and Whittier, Alaska. The ship returned to San Diego on 25 February and conducted a month of local operations before undergoing overhaul at the Puget Sound Naval Shipyard, Bremerton, Washington, from 31 March to 10 May 1949. Returning to San Diego, Union prepared for a third Point Barrow trip. The off-loading at Point Barrow, Alaska, was accomplished from 3 to 6 August. On 16 August, Union arrived back at Port Hueneme, California, and then proceeded to San Diego. She spent the remainder of 1949 in San Diego conducting local operations with the exception of Operation "Miki," a major amphibious exercise in the Hawaiian area held during the month of October.

Union departed Pearl Harbor on 7 November and arrived at Seattle, Washington, for a one-day stay. She returned to her home port on 21 November and operated in the San Diego area until 22 May 1950 when she set course for Yokosuka, Japan, arriving on 6 June.

=== Korean War, 1950–1953 ===
The Korean War began on 25 June 1950. On that day, Union was underway conducting landing exercises at Sagami Wan, Honshū, Japan. She stopped briefly at Yokosuka before arriving at Sasebo on 3 July for repairs. Repairs and training continued at Yokosuka until Union sailed to Yokohama on 11 July to embark Army troops and equipment for transportation to Pohang, Korea, on 18 July. Having delivered her cargo, the ship returned to Yokosuka on 25 July and conducted various exercises until 4 September when she arrived at Kobe, Japan, to reload. On 11 September, Union got underway for Jinsen, Korea, where boat landings took place four days later amidst mortar, machine gun, and rifle fire. On 21 September, Union departed for Sasebo, Japan, with seven casualties on board. After delivering the casualties, Union travelled to Kobe, Japan, arriving on 4 October. She set course for Inchon, Korea, that day and arrived four days later to unload marines and equipment. She stopped at Yonghung Man Kosen, Korea, for five days before arriving at Yokosuka on 2 November. Union then got underway for San Diego, California, returning to her home port on 22 November 1950.

Union then proceeded to the San Francisco Naval Shipyard for a regular overhaul which lasted from 1 December 1950 to 14 February 1951. She returned to San Diego on 24 February and operated in her home port area until 5 July. At that time, she set sail for the Puget Sound Naval Shipyard, Bremerton, Washington, for a month of repairs.

The next assignment for Union was the first of two resupply trips to the Pribilof Islands of St. Paul and St. George in the Bering Sea, the homeland of the largest fur-seal herd in the world. Her primary mission was to deliver tons of supplies to personnel of the Bureau of Commercial Fisheries who worked on the two small islands. The ship arrived back at San Diego on 4 September.

Later in September, Union sailed to Subic Bay, Philippines, carrying heavy earth-moving equipment. She then began forward area amphibious training with the 45th Army Division off the island of Hokkaidō, Japan. During December, the ship sailed to Hong Kong and lifted Allied troop replacements to Inchon, Korea. Union returned to Sasebo, Japan, on 22 December and remained in port through 15 January 1952.

On 19 January 1952, the ship returned to Yokosuka, Japan, and conducted operations between Yokosuka, Chigasaki, and Sasebo until March of that year.

On 19 March 1952, Union helped to shift a battalion of marines from Sokcho Ri, a harbor on the east coast of Korea, to the west coast. After the lift was accomplished, the ship returned to Yokosuka, Japan, on 5 April. After a trip to Buckner Bay on 19 April and several round trips between Yokosuka and Sasebo, she embarked troops and landed them on the island of Koje-do on 21 May. Union departed Yokosuka on 14 June for San Diego via Pearl Harbor. She arrived at San Diego on 2 July 1952 and spent the remainder of the summer in local operations and upkeep. In September, she sailed north to ban Francisco for a regular shipyard overhaul by Mechanix, Inc., which lasted from 25 September to 24 November 1952. Union spent the remainder of the year in the San Diego area.

The first half of 1953 was spent in refresher training and local operations in the San Diego area. On 14 July, Union sailed for her fifth cruise to the Orient. The war in Korea was concluded by a truce on 27 July, and Union arrived at Yokosuka, Japan, on 9 August. She received orders to Korea and transported North Korean prisoners of war from Koje-do to Inchon in two trips which fully occupied the month of August. From September through November, Union divided her time between Japan, Korea, and Hong Kong. The ship got underway for the United States on 1 December 1953 and returned to San Diego on 19 December 1953, in time for a leave and upkeep period over the holidays.

=== 1954–1959 ===
January through April 1954 found Union engaged in local operations and upkeep in the San Diego area. On 26 April, she sailed for San Francisco via Port Hueneme, California. From 3 May to 2 July, Union underwent a regular overhaul at the Todd Shipyards Corp., Alameda, California. The ship returned to San Diego on 11 July and spent the summer in refresher training.

On 1 October, Union joined Amphibious Squadron 1; and, on the 23rd, she departed for a sixth Western Pacific (WestPac) deployment. Union arrived at Yokosuka, Japan, on 10 November and underwent voyage repairs. She visited the Japanese ports of Osaka and Sasebo and celebrated Christmas at sea en route to Korea. While training Korean Marine Corps and Navy units, Union ushered in the New Year at Chinhae.

In January 1955, Union proceeded to Subic Bay, Philippines, via Sasebo, Japan. After a restricted availability at Subic and a visit to Hong Kong, Union departed in February for the Tachen Islands where she and other ships assisted in the evacuation of Chinese Nationalist troops and refugee civilians. Having landed the evacuees at Keelung on 13 February, Union visited Hong Kong, Yokosuka, and Beppu, Japan.

After loading men and equipment of the 1st Marine Division at Inchon, Union departed on 3 April for a quick turn-around trip to San Diego. She returned to Pusan, Korea, on 20 May and arrived back at San Pedro, California, on 12 June with Marine air group personnel and equipment.

Union spent the month of January 1956 participating in Operation "Cowealex" which called for a landing on Umnak Island in the Aleutians. Rough weather necessitated changing the landing site to Unalaska Island in Makuskin Bay. The ship returned to San Diego on 9 February and conducted local operations. Union then left California en route to Pearl Harbor to participate in a landing exercise, "Hawrltlex 1–56" which concluded on 11 April. She arrived at San Diego on 23 April and spent the months until November taking part in local operations and undergoing upkeep. Late in August, Union made a brief trip to Vancouver, British Columbia, to represent the United States Navy in the Pacific National Exhibit. On 13 November 1956, the ship sailed for San Francisco and an overhaul at the San Francisco Naval Shipyard at Hunters Point.

Having completed her regular overhaul, Union returned to San Diego on 27 January 1957 and conducted refresher training. She then took part in a number of amphibious exercises off Coronado Roads. In early June, Union turned in her 5-inch stern gun and her 20 millimeter mounts to the Naval Repair Facility, San Diego. In July, she participated in Operation "Workhorse," a local landing exercise.

On 23 August 1957, Union got underway for WestPac via Pearl Harbor. She arrived at Yokosuka, Japan, on 12 September and underwent restricted availability. Union then visited Kure, Nagoya, and Chigasaki Beach before returning to Yokosuka to pick up Marine Corps cargo for Naha, Okinawa. On 4 November, she sailed for Subic Bay, Philippines. Union spent the remainder of the year in cargo-carrying tasks which took her to Taiwan, the Philippines, Hong Kong, and Okinawa. Christmas and New Year's Day were spent in Subic Bay, Philippines.

The year 1958 began with a week-long visit to Hong Kong, after which she proceeded to Yokosuka. On 5 February, Union departed Yokosuka for Okinawa to prepare for Operation "Strongback," a major 7th Fleet amphibious assault exercise at Dingalen Bay, Luzon, Philippines, in which destroyers, cruisers, and carriers took part in screening, gunfire, and air support tasks. D-day was 1 March, and Union returned to San Diego, via Pearl Harbor, on 2 April.

April, May, and June 1958 were occupied with leave, upkeep, and local operations in the San Diego area. Union underwent a material inspection during July, and a resupply expedition to the Pribilof Islands scheduled for August was cancelled due to the Lebanon crisis which broke in early July. During September, the ship took part in "Phiblex 2–59," a full-scale landing exercise for the 1st Marine Division at Camp Pendleton.

After spending October in the San Diego area, Union sailed on 10 November for San Francisco and another regular yard overhaul. After off-loading cargo and ammunition, she arrived at the Mare Island Naval Shipyard for overhaul which lasted from 17 November 1958 to 16 January 1959.

Union returned to San Diego on 25 January. Shortly thereafter, she underwent refresher training, followed by amphibious training commencing on 17 March which completed her "working up." On 16 April, Union sailed for WestPac. On 22 April, she was detached and proceeded independently to Guam, thence to Subic Bay, Philippines. Throughout June, Union remained in the vicinity of Okinawa. She participated in Exercise "Reconnex 1–60" off Irimote Jima, Japan, from 20 to 28 June.

On 10 July 1959, Union and Comstock (LSD-19) embarked the 3rd Anti-Tank Battalion and sailed for Numazu, Japan, to commence the first phase of Operation "Tankex." Other ports which Union visited in connection with the operation were Kobe and Joji. In September, Union performed three weeks of duty as station ship in Hong Kong.

On 1 November 1959, Union set sail for San Diego via Pearl Harbor. She arrived at San Diego on 24 November and ended the year with a leave and upkeep period for the holiday season.

=== 1960–1965 ===
During the first six months of 1960, Union conducted local operations and necessary upkeep and repair periods in her home port area of San Diego. In February, she participated in Operation "Swan Dive," a Marine landing at Camp Pendleton. In May, she took part in Operation "Big Top," in which Marine air and naval surface units combined to land marines on Camp Pendleton beaches with an airlift of helicopter-borne troops among the initial assault waves.

On 21 June, Union deployed to WestPac via Pearl Harbor. During the first part of the deployment, the ship made stops at Guam; Okinawa; Subic Bay, Philippines; Hong Kong; and Yokosuka, Japan, conducting various cargo-personnel lifts. In September, Union embarked the Army's 1st Battle Group of the 2nd Infantry at Inchon, Korea, for a practice exercise on the beaches of Pohang Dong, Korea, and returned to Inchon. In October, Union visited the Japanese ports of Kure, Numazu, and Kobe. She carried out a people-to-people program which included an orphans' party, exchange of wardroom visits with Japanese officers, a tour of the ship by Japanese officers and petty officers, two visits for an evening meal by Japanese students from universities and colleges, a presentation of several utility items to a Numazu orphanage, and several softball games.

During a second visit to Hong Kong in November, Union acted as station ship. In December, she completed her WestPac deployment and returned to San Diego. A Christmas leave period commenced on 22 December.

The early weeks of 1961 were spent in leave and upkeep in anticipation of the regular overhaul commencing 15 February. Completed under four separate commercial repair contracts, the extended completion date was 26 April 1961. May, June, and July were spent in the San Diego area, where Union underwent two intensive training periods followed by leave and upkeep.

Departing San Diego on 4 August, Union was chartered by the Department of Commerce to make her second and the Navy's last resupply trip to the Pribilof Islands. Cargo off-loading operations commenced at St. George Island early on the 21st. Strong winds, high seas, and thick fog made this entire operation a challenge to seamanship and perseverance. The ship arrived at Seattle, Washington, on 3 September and disembarked passengers and cargo. The following year, the Department of Commerce would carry on this work with its own vessel, thus ending a Navy mission initiated in the 1920s by executive order of President Coolidge.

After five weeks in San Diego preparing for deployment, Union sailed for her home port on 16 October. Upon her arrival at Pearl Harbor, the ship took part in Operation "Silver Sword," a landing exercise of 5,000 marines on the beaches of Maui. The landing commenced one minute after midnight on 30 October. On 15 November. Amphibious Squadron 1 sailed from Pearl Harbor. Union and Washburn (AKA-108) broke off from the squadron and arrived at Sasebo on 28 November 1961. After voyage repairs at Sasebo, Union steamed to Hong Kong where she served as station ship for the remainder of the year, 16 December 1961 through 14 January 1962.

Union was relieved as station ship on 15 January, and she sailed for Subic Bay, Philippines. After 10 days of upkeep, Union returned to her work of amphibious operations and participated in the "Away All Boats" exercise.

The ship then sailed for Buckner Bay, Okinawa, to load a cargo of Marine Corps equipment. In February, Union learned that her deployment had been extended two weeks so she could participate in Operation "Tulungan," a SEATO exercise in which the United States Navy and Marine Corps, the Royal Australian Air Force, and Philippine units took part. An unusually long operation, "Tulungan" lasted from mid-February to mid-April. Union left Yokosuka for San Diego on 17 April.

After arriving in San Diego on 5 May 1962, Union spent May and June in leave, upkeep, and training exercises in the San Diego area. On 26 July, she steamed for an interim overhaul lasting from 1 August to 7 September at Seattle, Washington. Refresher training commenced off San Diego on 5 October. On 27 October, Union got underway for the Panama Canal with Task Group (TG) 53.2. Having transited the Panama Canal on 5 November, Union moored at Cristobal, Canal Zone, and later anchored at Limon Bay, Colon. Union arrived at Guantanamo Bay, Cuba, on 30 November to take part in the Cuban quarantine. She conducted cargo operations at Roosevelt Roads and Vieques, Puerto Rico, and enjoyed liberty at Kingston, Jamaica. On 2 December, Union got underway for California via the Panama Canal. She arrived back at San Diego on 16 December and spent the remainder of 1962 in leave and upkeep.

January 1963 was spent in preparing for and participating in amphibious operational training off Coronado, California. In February. Union got underway for the naval ammunition depot at Seal Beach, California, where the ammunition which had been on board for possible use during the Cuban crisis was off-loaded. The remainder of the month was spent preparing for Exercise "Steel Gate." At the completion of "Steel Gate," Union commenced preparation for her deployment to WestPac.

Union departed San Diego on 26 March for the transit to Okinawa via Pearl Harbor. While underway, she participated in Exercise "Windmill," which simulated a merchant convoy. After off-loading at Pearl Harbor and Okinawa, Union arrived at Sasebo, Japan, for routine voyage repairs. It was May when Union arrived at Yokosuka, Japan, to off-load material and accomplish routine upkeep.

The next mission of the Union was to participate in the 24th annual Black Ship Festival at Shimoda, Japan. This festival commemorates the arrival in Shimoda of Commodore Perry and his squadron of "Black Ships" in 1854. Having brought good will to Shimoda, Union next steamed to Sasebo for upkeep, then on to Pusan, Korea, where she provided facilities for Korean units to stage a ship-to-shore movement. June arrived with Union underway for Naha, Okinawa, to embark marines for the upcoming Operation "Flagpole" at Kuryongpo, Korea. Typhoon "Shirley" greatly hampered the landing phase of the operation, but it was finally completed despite torrential rains, floods, washed out roads, and dense fog.

After a port visit to Kure, Japan, Union off-loaded "Flagpole" gear at Buckner Bay, then underwent a period of upkeep at Yokosuka. It was there that she embarked midshipmen for a cruise which took her to the ports of Keelung, Taiwan; Hong Kong; and Subic Bay, Philippines, where the midshipmen debarked.

The ship travelled to Inchon, Korea, to prepare for Exercise "Bayonet Beach," which provided for ship-to-shore movements in the area of Pohang, Korea. After the exercise, Union sailed from Iwakuni, Japan, to Subic Bay, Philippines, with Marine aviation ordnance equipment. After a period of upkeep at Yokosuka, she visited Kobe, Japan, and met with an anti-American demonstration staged by the Japanese Peace Committee, a communist organization.

On 20 October 1963, Union proceeded south to Okinawa to rendezvous with her squadron and begin the transit to San Diego via Pearl Harbor. She arrived on 13 November and enjoyed a period of liberty. As the year came to an end, Union was preparing for an upcoming yard overhaul.

January 1964 found Union in San Diego concluding a leave and upkeep period. On 18 January, she sailed for San Francisco and, four days later, proceeded to Richmond, California, for drydocking at the Willamette Iron and Steel Co. Drydocking was completed on 6 February and the remainder of the overhaul on 26 March. Union returned to San Diego on 4 April and, on the 27th, reported for four weeks of intensive refresher training. Training reached a successful culmination on 22 May, and a two-week upkeep period followed.

From 8 to 19 June, Union participated in amphibious refresher training at Coronado, California. A period of availability alongside Klondike (AR-22) followed; and, from 3 to 12 July, Union was assigned an upkeep period. Union enjoyed an extended period of upkeep from 17 July to 24 August when Operation "Cascade Columbia II," scheduled to commence on 13 August, was cancelled as a result of the tense military situation in Vietnam.

After conducting a midshipmen cruise and on-loading supplies and marines, Union got underway from San Diego on 25 August to participate in Exercise "Sea Bar" at Solo Point, Wash. Two days later, Union proceeded independently to Astoria, Oregon, to take part in the 44th annual Astoria Regatta and Fish Festival. On 1 September, Exercise "Sea Bar" got underway for nine days of amphibious landings. On 14 September, Union returned to her home port and underwent a material inspection.

The ship next began to prepare for Exercise "Hard Nose," a major amphibious landing exercise involving 39 ships and some 11,000 marines. The 12-day exercise began on 6 October and concluded on the beach of Camp Pendleton on the morning of 17 October. Upon returning to San Diego, Union began an extended period of upkeep in preparation for an upcoming WestPac deployment.

On 16 November, Union departed San Diego for a 5,900-mile transit of the Pacific Ocean. On 7 December, she arrived at Buckner Bay, Okinawa. After off-loading and readying the boat group, Union got underway for local operations. On 20 December, Union set course for Subic Bay, Philippines. Three days later, she moored at Rivera Point, Subic Bay. The crew received an unexpected treat when comedian Bob Hope and his troupe presented their annual Christmas show at Subic Bay on 28 December 1964.

=== Vietnam, 1965–1969 ===
Union began the New Year 1965 with a round-trip from Subic Bay to Buckner Bay, Okinawa, and Hong Kong. She returned to Subic Bay on 23 January and conducted task group operations throughout the month of February. On 8 March, Union anchored at Da Nang, South Vietnam. On 12 March, she departed for Yokosuka, Japan, where she went into drydock until 29 March. After spending several days moored pierside, Union departed on 6 April for special operations at Buckner Bay, Okinawa. On 14 April, the ship anchored at Da Nang, along with USS Cook, USS Henrico and amphibious assault ship USS Vancouver. They transported marines to Da Nang, bringing the total to nearly 8,000.

Upon leaving Da Nang, South Vietnam, Union sailed to an anchorage at the mouth of the Perfume River and remained there until 19 April. She anchored briefly at Buckner Bay, Okinawa, before conducting four days of special operations culminating in a landing at Baie De Dung, Vietnam. On 16 May, Union again returned to Buckner Bay, only to sail again four days later for Chu Lai harbor, Vietnam, conducting special operations en route. On 27 May, she arrived at Da Nang harbor, and proceeded to Yokosuka, Japan, arriving there on 4 June 1965.

Union departed the Far East and arrived at San Diego, California, on 23 June. The month of July was spent undergoing tender availability with USS Klondike. After loading ammunition at Seal Beach, California, Union again departed for Buckner Bay, Okinawa, arriving on 28 August. The ship set course for Yokosuka, Japan, on 31 August; and, after a nine-day visit, Union sailed for Pearl Harbor, Hawaii, arriving there on 21 September. Two days later, she got underway for San Diego, where she arrived on 30 September.

October and November were spent in port at San Diego. In mid-December, she got underway for local operations, and Union finished the year 1965 moored at her home port.

The first six months of 1966 were spent in amphibious refresher training and restricted availability at San Diego. During July, Union prepared for deployment by loading ammunition and Marine cargo. On 27 July, the ship departed for another WestPac cruise. She arrived at Okinawa on 22 August, then continued to Da Nang, South Vietnam, where she back-loaded BLT 3/3 (Battalion Landing Team, 3rd Battalion, 3rd Marines) and transported the marines to Okinawa for a recreation and retraining cycle. Union then proceeded to Cam Ranh Bay, South Vietnam, where, on 15 September, elements of the Republic of Korea Marines were loaded for transportation to Chu Lai. When this offload had been completed, boiler troubles forced Union into an availability at Subic Bay from 27 September through 7 October.

With all repairs completed, Union commenced a lengthy period of support operations for Commander, Military Assistance Command, Vietnam, which extended to 21 November. The ship arrived at Okinawa on 26 November and, after a few days for liberty and replenishment, loaded elements of BLT 1st Battalion, 9th Marines (BLT 1/9). She sailed for Subic Bay, Philippines, on 3 December. On 14 December, Bravo Company from BLT 1/9 conducted wet-net training on the "Union" to practice amphibious doctrine in preparation for Operation Deckhouse V. After her detachment from this duty, Union set course for Sasebo, looking forward to a holiday upkeep period which lasted through the 27th. As the year closed, Union was once again at Okinawa loading BLT 4th Battalion, 4th Marines. On the final day of 1966, a practice turnaway landing was conducted at Chin Wan in preparation for actual movement across the beach that would follow on New Year's Day.

The first day of 1967 found Union in the last phase of her WestPac tour. After landing craft training operations in the Okinawa area, Union departed Okinawa en route to Da Nang, Vietnam. After off-loading and back-loading Marine vehicles, the ship returned to Okinawa on 14 January. An upkeep period at Sasebo, Japan, began on 17 January and was followed by rest and recreation at Keelung, Taiwan, and Kobe, Japan. On 15 February, Union set course for Yokosuka, Japan, spending 10 days in port there and then departing for San Diego. Union entered San Diego Bay on 15 March 1967, completing her 15th WestPac cruise.

After a month-long leave period, preparations began for Operation "Alligator Hide," an amphibious assault at Coronado Roads, California. Following the operation, Union spent 13 days in port and, on 15 May, conducted individual ship exercises. On 29 May 1967, Union suddenly received orders to perform duties as a reconnaissance ship, trailing the Russian trawler Peleng, which had been operating off the coast of southern California near Catalina and San Clemente Islands. Union stayed within close range of the trawler for 10 days. On 5 June, she was relieved on station by USS Taussig and returned to San Diego.

After an administrative inspection, the ship made preparations for overhaul which commenced on 8 July at Pacific Ship Repair, Inc., San Francisco, California. She returned to her home port on 1 October to prepare for refresher training. A month-long refresher training period ended on 1 December and was followed by an amphibious inspection which was completed on 22 December. Union spent the 1967 holiday season moored at her home port.

The new year, 1968, began with Union enjoying a leave period which lasted until 26 January. On 1 February, Union departed San Diego for another WestPac deployment. Union arrived at Buckner Bay, Okinawa, on 26 February. She operated off the coast of Vietnam transporting much-needed equipment and ammunition. From 20 to 27 March, the ship participated in Operation "Former Champ" with Nationalist Chinese ships and marines in Taiwan. On 7 April, Union escorted USS Asheville to Subic Bay, Philippines, for engineering repairs. After a brief stop at Yokosuka, Japan, the ship set course for San Diego via Pearl Harbor. Union arrived at her home port on 16 September 1968 after completing a seven-month deployment.

Upon returning to San Diego, Union enjoyed a month-long period of leave. On 16 October, she commenced an upkeep period followed by a period of restricted availability which lasted through 30 November. The ship conducted independent ship's exercises before commencing a holiday leave period on 14 December.

From 1 January to 1 August 1969, her schedule was filled with all types of operational training, inspections, and upkeep evolutions in the San Diego-San Francisco area. Union conducted training exercises at Acapulco, Mexico, from 14 to 27 April; and, from 17 to 21 June, the ship took part in Exercise "Bell Call," an amphibious operation which included embarkation, withdrawal, movement, demonstration, simultaneous surface and helicopter assault, and subsequent troop exercise ashore.

On 1 August 1969, Union departed San Diego en route to Pearl Harbor, thence to Yokosuka, Japan, arriving on 23 August. After a brief upkeep period, she departed on 29 August for Okinawa where she spent three days conducting amphibious exercises. On 5 September, Union got underway for Da Nang, Vietnam. She transported cargo from Da Nang to Okinawa until 19 November when she departed Da Nang for Subic Bay, Philippines.

Having off-loaded three-fourths of the ship's ammunition in preparation for a homeward transit, Union proceeded to Okinawa on 26 November to complete her offloading. She departed Okinawa three days later for the long voyage to San Diego where she arrived on 18 December. Union deviated from her course twice; on 6 December to transport an injured marine to a hospital on Midway Island as soon as possible; the next day, to assist in the restoration of the French Frigate Shoals LORAN station at Tern Island, Hawaii. The remainder of 1969, from 18 to 31 December, was devoted to a leave period for the ship's crew.

=== Decommissioning and sale ===
Union was placed out of commission, in reserve, on 5 June 1970 and transferred to the Maritime Administration at Suisun Bay, California. On 1 September 1976, she was stricken from the Navy List. Union was sold in September 1977 to National Metal and Steel Corp. of Terminal Island, California, for scrapping.

== Awards ==
Union was awarded two battle stars for Korean service and nine battle stars for her Vietnam service.

== Bibliography ==
- Silverstone, Paul H. (2008). The Navy of World War II, 1922-1947. The U.S. Navy Warship Series. New York: Routledge. ISBN 978-0-415-97898-9.
