= USS La Salle (AGF-3) =

American amphibious transport dock (1964–2005)

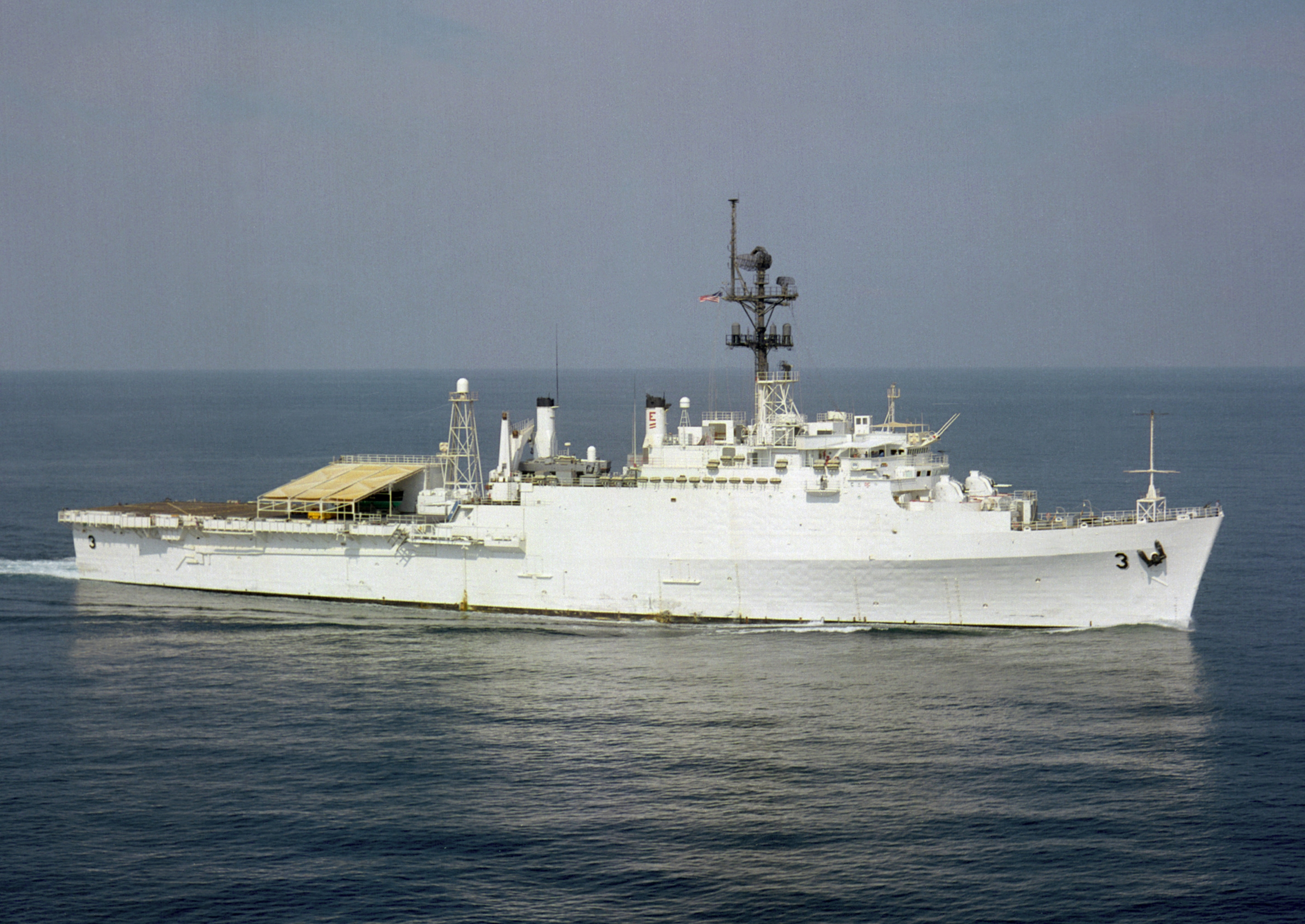
- USS La Salle (AGF-3) underway in the Persian Gulf in 1990

History

United States
- Name: La Salle
- Namesake: La Salle, Illinois
- Ordered: 8 August 1960
- Builder: New York Naval Shipyard, Brooklyn, New York
- Laid down: 2 April 1962
- Launched: 3 August 1963
- Acquired: 21 February 1964
- Commissioned: 22 February 1964
- Decommissioned: 27 May 2005
- Reclassified: 1972 as miscellaneous command ship (AGF-3)
- Stricken: 27 May 2005
- Fate: Sunk as target in support of Fleet training exercise, 11 April 2007

General characteristics
- Class & type: Raleigh-class amphibious transport dock
- Displacement: 9,559 long tons (9,712 t) light; 13,634 long tons (13,853 t) full; 4,075 long tons (4,140 t) dead
- Length: 522 ft (159 m) o/a; 500 ft (150 m) w/l
- Beam: 107 ft (33 m) extreme; 84 ft (26 m) w/l
- Draft: 22 ft (6.7 m) maximum; 23 ft (7.0 m) limit
- Speed: 23 knots (43 km/h; 26 mph)
- Complement: 72 officers, 593 men, 24 Marines As AGF 750 Marines as LPD
- Armament: 4 × 3-inch/50-caliber guns in twin turrets; 2 x 20 mm Phalanx CIWS; 2 x 25 mm chain guns (1987); 2 x 40 mm Mk. 19 grenade launchers; 6 x .50 cal. BMG; 6 x 7.62 M60 machine guns; 2 Stinger missile operator rings; SRBOC chaff launchers; 40 mm signal gun
- Aircraft carried: Up to 6 rotary aircraft
- Aviation facilities: Hangar, extensible.

The second USS La Salle (LPD-3/AGF-3) was built as a Raleigh-class amphibious transport dock and entered service with the United States Navy in 1964. La Salle was named for the city in Illinois that was in turn named after René-Robert Cavelier, Sieur de La Salle. La Salle saw service in the Caribbean Sea, Gulf of Mexico and throughout international waters in the Middle East and Europe. The vessel served as a command ship for Joint Task Force Middle East and as flagship for the Sixth Fleet. In 2005 the ship was decommissioned and sunk as a target ship off the coast Pensacola, FL in the Gulf of Mexico in 2007.

== Construction and career ==
Her keel was laid down by New York Naval Shipyard, Brooklyn, New York, on 2 April 1962. She was launched on 3 August 1963 sponsored by Mrs. Victor M. Longstreet, and commissioned on 22 February 1964.

=== Amphibious transport, 1964–1968 ===
After shakedown and training in the Caribbean Sea and off Norfolk, Virginia, the amphibious transport dock departed Norfolk on 9 October to participate in "Operation Steel Pike I", a complex training exercise involving over 80 ships and United States and Spanish troops. It closed the coast of Spain off Huelva on 26 October, and embarked Under Secretary of the Navy Paul B. Fay, Vice Chief of Naval Operations Admiral Horacio Rivero, Commandant of the Marine Corps General Wallace M. Greene, and Chairman of the House Armed Services Committee Congressman Mendel Rivers to watch the landing operations.

The exercise completed on 4 November, La Salle joined the 6th Fleet at Naples, Italy, for amphibious operations and joint NATO training. It returned to Norfolk on 13 March 1965.

With then-Vice Admiral John S. McCain, Jr., Commander Amphibious Forces, Atlantic Fleet embarked, La Salle sailed on 1 May for the Dominican Republic during the revolution where she served as command and control for the operation, returning to Norfolk on 1 June. Three weeks later it joined the Caribbean Amphibious Ready Squadron, returning to home port on 21 September to begin training operations along the east coast and in the Caribbean.

Through the first half of 1966, La Salle continued operating off the east coast. July and September were spent in Norfolk for upkeep and modifications, with further exercises following. On 3 November, she recovered a Gemini 2-MOL test space capsule near Ascension Island. This was the Gemini 2 space capsule's second flight. This was returned to Florida's Cape Kennedy, and the rest of the year spent on local operations in the Atlantic. La Salle entered the Norfolk Naval Shipyard on 9 January 1967 for repairs and remained there until 20 March. The remainder of 1967 and the first three quarters of 1968 were spent conducting various exercises and port visits which ranged along the entire Atlantic and Gulf of Mexico coasts and into the Caribbean as well. On 2 November she put into Norfolk to prepare for an extended deployment with the Sixth Fleet. Departing 13 November, she steamed first to Morehead City, North Carolina, and then began her voyage to the Mediterranean Sea.

=== Command ship, 1972–2005 ===
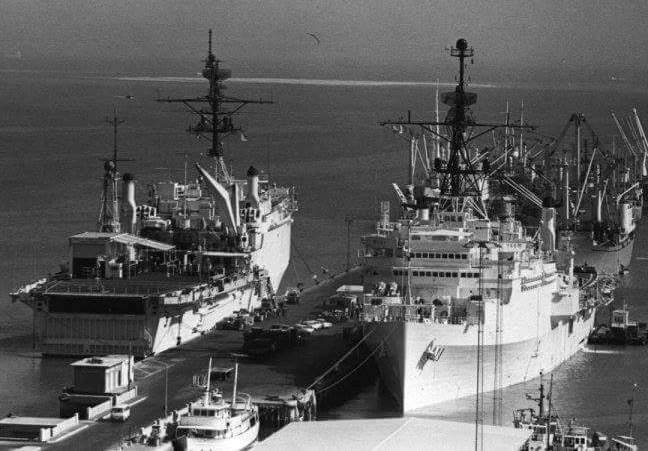
USS La Salle (Left) and USS Coronado (right) moored in Bahrain in 1980. Coronado was relieving LaSalle as the flagship for the Commander, Middle East Force (now called United States Naval Forces Central Command). Due to the nature of U.S. flagships individually covering large geographic areas, it was a rare occurrence for both ships to be in the same port.

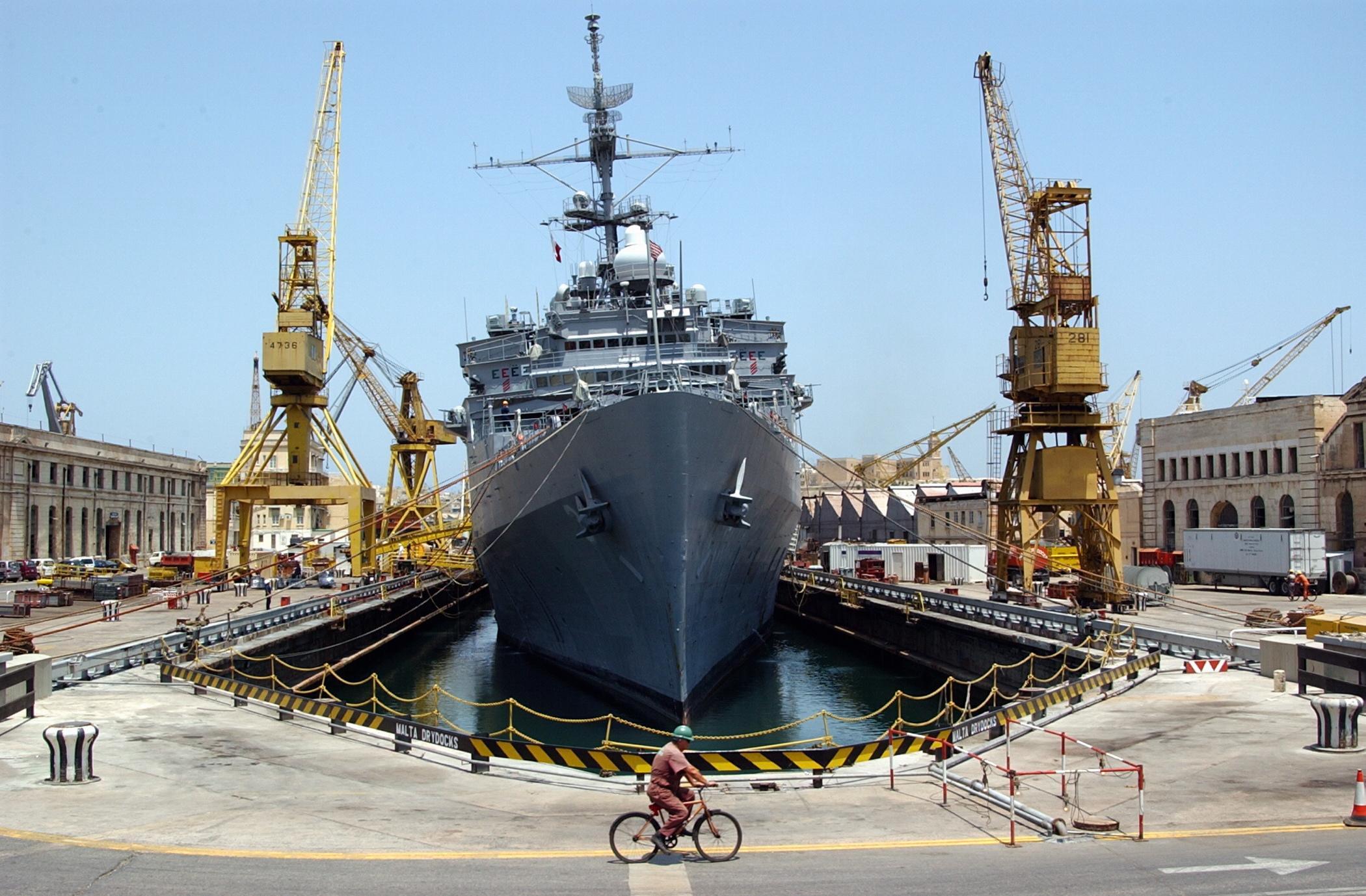
A Maltese shipyard worker heads home on his bicycle after a day's work on USS La Salle in Cospicua.

La Salle was converted to a "miscellaneous command ship" and given the hull classification symbol AGF-3 after an overhaul in 1972. After re-fitting in 1972 she was sent to homeport in Bahrain and serve in a mainly surveillance capacity, with as many as 60 NSA personnel assigned to the ship, at a time when one of America's main allies in the Middle East, the Shah of Iran, controlled the Persian Gulf. To accommodate all the extra electronic equipment, the La Salle was painted white to reflect the heat of its operating environment. Admiral William J. Crowe, who later became Chairman of the Joint Chiefs of Staff under President Ronald Reagan, was named Commander Middle East Force and assigned to La Salle to serve in this sensitive role. In this time before the Gulf War, piracy off the east coast of Africa and the re-activation of the U.S. Fifth Fleet, only La Salle along with two U.S. Navy destroyers dispatched from the U.S. east coast on a six-month rotating basis were routinely on patrol in the Persian Gulf, Red Sea and the general Indian Ocean regions. La Salle was considered by the Navy to be isolated duty and anything but a plum assignment by its crew. To symbolize its relatively minor status as a fighting ship at this time, La Salle's nickname, emblazoned on T-shirts sold in the ship's store and wryly smiled about by those many of the ship's crew who wore them, unofficially became "The Great White Whale". By the time of Gulf War the ship had become known, more appropriately to its future operational roles, by its new nickname "The Great White Ghost of the Arabian Coast".

In 1979, La Salle assisted in the evacuation of 260 American and foreign national civilians from the Iranian seaport of Bandar Abbas, and subsequently became the focal point of U.S. activity in the Persian Gulf at the outset of the Iranian Hostage Crisis. The ship returned to the United States in late 1980 for the first time in almost nine years.

After undergoing an extensive overhaul in Philadelphia, La Salle returned to the Persian Gulf and resumed her role as the flagship for Commander, Middle East Forces (COMMIDEASTFOR) in June 1983, relieving USS Coronado. In 1984, the ship conducted minesweeping operations in the Red Sea in response to attempts to disrupt shipping lanes for which it was awarded a Meritorious Unit Citation, and in 1986, conducted contingency operations in the Gulf of Aden during Yemen's civil war.

After the Iraqi missile attack on the frigate USS Stark in May 1987, La Salle provided the primary firefighting rescue assistance to the ship. Later that year "La Salle" served as the staging ship for the seizure of the "Iran Ajr" minelaying vessel on 21 September, including receiving the detained crew members for later repatriation, and the mines from the Iran Ajr for intelligence exploitation. She was the flagship of Rear Admiral Harold Bernsen during this engagement, and among other duties hosted "members of a Pentagon news media pool".

In June 1988, after spending months in Japan for a major overhaul on the engines, La Salle was heading back to the Persian Gulf. On 3 July 1988 the cruiser USS Vincennes shot down an Airbus passenger aircraft, Iran Air Flight 655, while La Salle was in Subic Bay, Philippines for repairs. It became urgent for the ship to return to Bahrain, and be positioned off the coast of Saudi Arabia. La Salle passed Vincennes in the Strait of Hormuz, soon after the incident. On 21 July 1988, La Salle officially assumed Commander of Middle East Forces and three generals and an admiral were assigned to it. An Armed Forces Expeditionary Medal was awarded to the crew members.

During Operation Desert Shield, the ship assumed the responsibility of commanding and coordinating the multinational Maritime Intercept Force. Returning to a conventional gray paint scheme, La Salle assumed responsibilities as the flagship for Commander, Sixth Fleet on 8 November 1994. Homeported in Gaeta, Italy, La Salle was fully engaged in operations throughout the Mediterranean and Black Seas in its role of supporting Commander, U.S. 6th Fleet and Strike Force and Logistics South.

Following the September 11 attacks, La Salle commenced her role in the war on terrorism, serving in support of Operation Enduring Freedom and Operation Iraqi Freedom.

One of the ship's last major assignments was supporting NATO-led efforts to control the international waters off Greece during the 2004 Summer Olympics in Athens. On 25 February 2005, she was relieved by USS Mount Whitney as the U.S. Sixth Fleet command ship.

=== Decommissioning and disposal ===
La Salle was decommissioned at Norfolk, Virginia on 27 May 2005, with Captain (later Vice Admiral) Herman Shelanski as its last commanding officer and former La Salle commanding officer, Rear Admiral Mark Milliken, as the decommissioning ceremony guest speaker. It was sunk as a target by the United States Navy on 11 April 2007 during a scheduled fleet exercise approximately 50 miles off the coast of Pensacola, FL in the Gulf of Mexico.

== Awards ==
- Combat Action Ribbon
- Navy Unit Commendation (2 awards)
- Navy Meritorious Unit Commendation (4 awards)
- Navy Battle "E" Ribbon (2 awards)
- Navy Expeditionary Medal (3 awards)
- National Defense Service Medal with two stars
- Armed Forces Expeditionary Medal (3 awards)
- Southwest Asia Service Medal with three stars
- Global War on Terrorism Expeditionary Medal
- Global War on Terrorism Service Medal
- Armed Forces Service Medal (4 awards)
- Humanitarian Service Medal (2 awards)
- Kuwait Liberation Medal, Kuwait
- Kuwait Liberation Medal, Saudi Arabia
