= Raleigh-class amphibious transport dock =

Class of amphibious transport docks

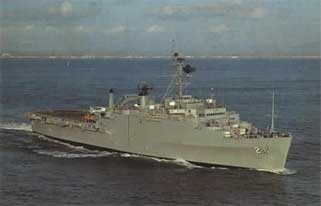
- USS Vancouver

Class overview
- Name: Raleigh class
- Builders: New York Naval Shipyard
- Operators: United States Navy
- Preceded by: None
- Succeeded by: Austin class
- Built: 1960–1964
- In commission: 1962–2005
- Completed: 3
- Retired: 3

General characteristics
- Type: Amphibious transport dock
- Displacement: 9,559 long tons (9,712 t) light; 13,634 long tons (13,853 t) full; 4,075 long tons (4,140 t) dead
- Length: 522 ft (159 m) o/a; 500 ft (150 m) w/l
- Beam: 107 ft (33 m) extreme; 84 ft (26 m) w/l
- Draft: 22 ft (6.7 m) maximum; 23 ft (7.0 m) limit
- Speed: 23 knots (43 km/h; 26 mph)
- Complement: 72 officers, 593 enlisted, 24 Marines as AGF/750 Marines as LPD
- Armament: 2 × twin 3"/50 caliber guns; 2 x 20 mm Phalanx CIWS; 2 x 25 mm chain guns (1987); 2 x 40 mm Mk. 19 grenade launchers; 6 x .50 cal. BMG; 6 x 7.62 M60 machine guns; 2 Stinger missile operator rings; SRBOC chaff launchers
- Aircraft carried: Up to 6 rotary aircraft

The Raleigh class of amphibious transport docks served the United States Navy. They were designed under project SCB 187 (the La Salle with its command facilities was designed under SCB 187A).

== Ships ==
Ship	Hull No.	Builder	Commissioned– Decommissioned	NVR Page
Raleigh	LPD-1	New York Naval Shipyard	1962–1991	LPD-1
Vancouver	LPD-2	New York Naval Shipyard	1963–1992	LPD-2
La Salle	AGF-3	New York Naval Shipyard	1964–2005	AGF-3
