= USS Henrico =

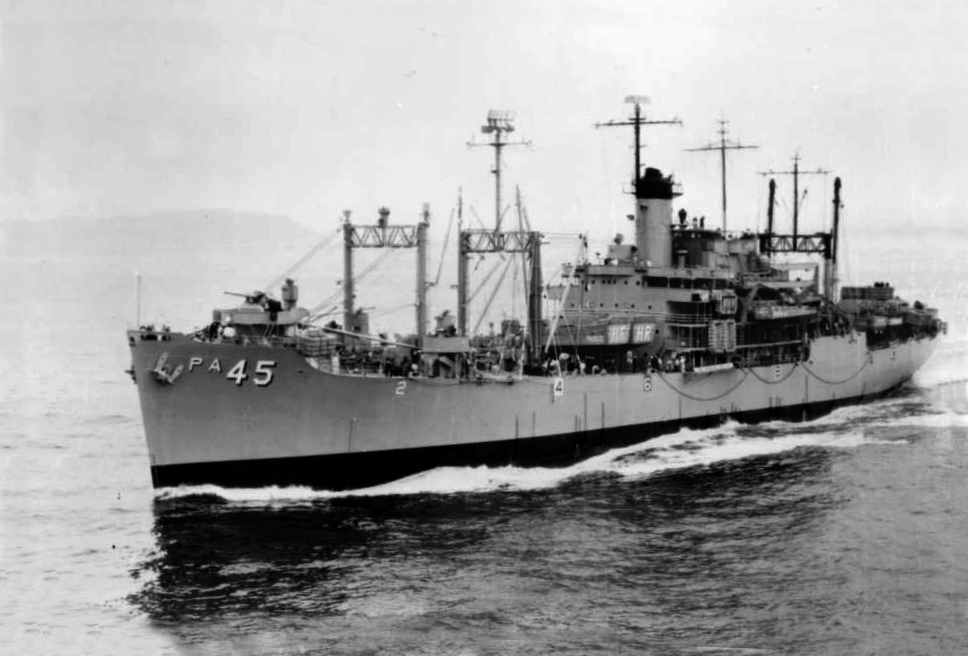
- USS Henrico (APA-45), Vietnam era (1960s).

History

United States
- Name: USS Henrico (APA-45)
- Namesake: Henrico County, Virginia
- Builder: Ingalls Shipbuilding, Pascagoula, Mississippi
- Laid down: 12 November 1942
- Launched: 31 March 1943
- Sponsored by: Mrs. W. D. Pelan
- Christened: SS Sea Darter
- Acquired: 23 June 1943
- Commissioned: 26 November 1943
- Decommissioned: 14 February 1968
- Reclassified: AP-90 to APA-45, 1 February 1943; APA-45 to LPA-45, 1 January 1969
- Stricken: 1 June 1973
- Honors and awards: 3 battle stars (World War II); 9 battle stars & Navy Unit Commendation (Korea); 1 campaign star (Vietnam)
- Fate: Sold by MARAD, 1 October 1979, scrapped.

General characteristics
- Class & type: Bayfield-class attack transport
- Displacement: 8,100 long tons (8,230 t) light; 16,100 long tons (16,358 t) full
- Length: 492 ft (150 m)
- Beam: 69 ft 6 in (21.18 m)
- Draft: 26 ft 6 in (8.08 m)
- Propulsion: General Electric geared turbine; 2 × Foster Wheeler D-type boilers; 8,500 shp (6,338 kW); single propeller
- Speed: 18 knots (33 km/h; 21 mph)
- Boats & landing craft carried: 12 × LCVP; 4 × LCM (Mk.6); 3 × LCPL (Mk.IV)
- Capacity: 4,500 tons (180,500 cu. ft).
- Troops: 80 officers, 1,146 enlisted
- Complement: Normal crew: 51 officers, 524 enlisted; Flag staff: 43 officers, 108 enlisted
- Armament: 2 × single 5"/38 caliber guns (fore and aft); 2 × twin 40 mm AA guns; 2 × single 40 mm AA guns; 18 × single 20 mm AA guns

USS Henrico (APA-45) was a Bayfield-class attack transport that served with the United States Navy in World War II, and subsequently in the Korean War, Cold War and Vietnam War. It is named after Henrico County, Virginia.

The ship was laid down as SS Sea Darter, a Type C3-S-A2 hull, under a Maritime Commission contract (MC hull 393) by Ingalls Shipbuilding Co., Pascagoula, Mississippi. Assigned to the Navy as Naval Transport (AP-90), she was reclassified as Attack Transport (APA-45) on 1 February 1943.

The ship was launched on 31 March 1943, sponsored by Mrs. W. D. Pelan, acquired by the Navy on 23 June 1943, and commissioned next day for transfer to Bethlehem Shipbuilding Corporation, Hoboken, New Jersey. Decommissioned on 8 July 1943, Henrico then fitted out, and recommissioned on 26 November 1943.

The ship makes an appearance in the 1952 film My Son John. It is shown in the background when Chuck (Richard Jaeckel) is speaking to his mother.

== Service history ==
=== World War II, 1943–1945 ===
Following shakedown training in Chesapeake Bay, the attack transport remained to train Army combat teams before departing Norfolk for New York on 2 February 1944. Arriving the next day, Henrico embarked troops and sailed for Scotland on 11 February. Arriving at the Firth of Clyde on 22 February, the ship began amphibious training in preparation for the invasion of Normandy.

==== Normandy invasion ====
Henrico embarked her invasion troops on 26 May at Portland, England, and sailed on 5 June as a part of Rear Admiral John Hall's Omaha Beach Assault Force. On the following day, 6 June, Henrico landed her troops, the 16th Regiment of the First Infantry Division, in the first assault wave on the Easy Red Sector of Omaha Beach in the face of heavy seas and strong enemy fortifications. As the tempo of fighting increased, the ship received casualties from the beaches, returning to Portland later on "D-Day." As the assault area was secured and the advance began, Henrico stood by for shuttle duty, finally sailing for the Firth of Clyde on 19 June.

==== Mediterranean operations ====
With the liberation of France underway, the transport sailed on 4 July 1944 to the Mediterranean for the invasion of the southern coast of France. Arriving on 16 July in Naples, Henrico took part in amphibious rehearsals before departing on 13 August from Castellamare for the invasion area. She landed her troops at Baie de Pampelonne against light opposition and departed the next day for Oran, Algeria. For the next two months she brought troops and cargo into the beach area and on her last shuttle brought English and Polish repatriates to Naples.

==== To the Pacific ====
Henrico sailed from Naples on 17 October 1944, arriving at Boston on 8 November to prepare for duty in the western Pacific. She departed Norfolk with troops and replacement boats on 13 December, steaming via the Panama Canal and San Diego to Pearl Harbor, where she arrived on 23 January 1945. Five days later she sailed for the Philippines, arriving at Leyte on 21 February after stops at various Pacific bases. In the Philippines the ship engaged in amphibious exercises leading to the invasion of Okinawa, the last operation on the long island road to Japan itself.

==== Invasion of Okinawa ====
Assigned to the Kerama Retto attack group under Rear Admiral Kiland, Henrico began the landing on 26 March. The Kerama Islands were needed as a staging area for the invasion of nearby Okinawa and were secured on 30 March. The ship retired at night during the operation, and Japanese air attacks were nearly constant. While retiring on 2 April, the ship was attacked by a fast Yokosuka P1Y "Frances" attack bomber, configured as a kamikaze, diving out of a cloud formation. Although Henrico quickly brought her guns to bear, the suicide bomber crashed into the bridge on the starboard side, her bombs exploding below. The ship lost power, but her fire parties soon brought the flames under control. Forty-nine officers and men were killed in the attack, including Henrico's captain, Captain William C. France, USN; her embarked division commander; and the two troop commanders. Her Executive Officer took command, however, and brought the ship to Kerama Retto. She sailed under her own power for San Francisco on 14 April and arrived on 13 May.

=== Post-war activities, 1945–1949 ===
Henrico sailed from San Francisco Bay on 1 September with replacement troops for the Philippines. She continued to serve the "Magic Carpet" fleet assigned to return the thousands of American soldiers from the Pacific, until May 1946. She sailed on 25 May from Pearl Harbor to take part in the atomic tests at Bikini – "Operation Crossroads". For the next three months Henrico supported these scientific experiments, returning to San Francisco on 29 August 1946. After operations on the West Coast, she sailed on 6 February 1947 for a cruise in the western Pacific, returning in July. From 6 July 1948 to 25 February 1949 the ship operated in the Tsingtao, China, area in support of American troops.

=== Korean War, 1950–1953 ===
Early in 1950 Henrico took part in amphibious exercises in the Caribbean, returning to San Diego on 8 April 1950. Soon afterward the invasion of South Korea began, and Henrico was immediately deployed to the western Pacific. Henrico and other ships embarked the 1st Marine Brigade and sailed on 12 July for Korea. She developed mechanical trouble which forced a return two days later, but repair work had her at sea again on 18 July, and by 2 August she was with the original formation as they steamed into Pusan with the vitally-needed troops.

Henrico played an important part in the early stages of the Korean War. She landed troops at the Inchon beachhead on 15 September 1950; and, as United Nations troops swept northward, she sailed to various ports deploying and supplying the soldiers. In November Chinese troops made their appearance on a massive scale, and by December U.N. ground units in the Wonsan-Hŭngnam area were cut off. During December Henrico and other ships evacuated thousands of soldiers from the two ports to stabilize the lines farther south.

The attack transport arrived at Seattle on 22 March 1951, and after repairs and amphibious exercises sailed again for Korea on 16 October 1951. During this second tour she carried troops to strategic points on the coast, and took part in amphibious operations for training purposes. She arrived back at San Diego on 26 July 1952, and in September returned to Pearl Harbor for repairs and training.

Henrico sailed again for Korean waters on 7 March 1953, resuming the job of redeploying troops along the coasts and to Japan. During July and August she operated between Pusan and Japan, and joined in the transfer of prisoners following the armistice agreement. For her outstanding performance during the first months of the conflict, Henrico was awarded the Navy Unit Commendation.

=== Pacific deployments, 1953–1962 ===
Arriving at San Francisco on 24 August 1953, the attack transport engaged in coastal training operations for the next year. She sailed for another tour in the Far East on 24 October 1954, and participated in an amphibious training exercise in December. As war over the Tachen Islands threatened in February, Henrico and other naval units moved in on 8 February 1955 to evacuate Nationalist Chinese troops. After arriving Keelung, Formosa, on 13 February; she carried troops between the Philippines and Hong Kong before returning to San Diego on 22 April 1955.

Hereafter the ship deployed annually to the western Pacific with the 7th Fleet to engage in amphibious warfare training exercises in Korea, in Okinawa, and in the Philippines, contributing to the combat readiness of both United States Marines and the troops of SEATO members.

=== Cuban Missile Crisis, 1962 ===
Henrico was diverted to the Caribbean Sea on 27 October 1962 after the deployment of Soviet missiles in Cuba brought a swift and strict American quarantine of the island. Henrico arrived on the scene on 5 November. Her embarked Marines provided part of a ready force to supplement the naval blockade if this proved necessary. When the missiles were removed, the crisis subsided, and Henrico departed the Caribbean on 6 December for San Diego, California, arriving on 15 December.

=== Pacific Deployment, 1963−1964 ===
The ship deployed to the Western Pacific for a routine deployment with the 7th Fleet. While deployed, she conducted amphibious operations with Marine and Army troops at Okinawa and Korea. In addition to Okinawa and Korea, Henrico made port visits in Japan, the Philippines, and Hong Kong. The ship returned to its homeport of San Diego early in 1964, followed by overhaul at Todd Shipyard in San Pedro.

=== Vietnam War, 1964–1967 ===
The ship resumed amphibious training duties on the West Coast until 16 December 1964, when she deployed again with the 7th Fleet in the western Pacific. She was also Flag for COMPHIBRON-1 during these times. Loading a Marine Battalion Landing Team at Okinawa, the ship departed on 11 January 1965 for Hong Kong, arriving on 14 January. On 20 January she commenced special operations in the South China Sea as the 7th Fleet joined in the intensive buildup of strength in southeast Asia.

Henrico disembarked her Marines at Da Nang, South Vietnam, on 5 March 1965, returning to Okinawa for a second landing team which reached Da Nang on 15 April. By 21 April, the ship embarked a third landing team bound for Chu Lai, South Vietnam. Offloading these troops on 7 May, Henrico made a fourth passage to Okinawa to return with the headquarters unit of the 3rd Marine Division, which arrived in Chu Lai on 21 May.

Following her performance off South Vietnam, the ship sailed from Yokosuka, Japan, on 28 May for San Diego, arriving on 16 June. During the next 13 months Henrico operated out of San Diego along the coast of Southern California, conducting squadron exercises and supporting amphibious training operations. After embarking Marines at San Diego, she sailed for the Far East on 27 July, and debarked her passengers at Da Nang a month later.

During the next seven months she carried troop reinforcements and replacements from Okinawa and the Philippines to American bases in South Vietnam. In addition she ranged the coastal waters of Vietnam from the demilitarized zone to the Mekong Delta, supporting amphibious assaults against Viet Cong coastal strongholds. She departed Vietnam late in March 1967 and returned to San Diego the following month.

== Call sign ==
Henrico's call sign was: "NKIG".

=== Decommissioning and sale ===
Henrico was decommissioned on 14 February 1968. Held in reserve, she was redesignated as an "amphibious transport" or "LPA" with a new hull number of LPA-45 on 1 January 1969, and finally struck from the Navy List on 1 June 1973. The ship was sold by MARAD on 1 October 1979 for scrapping.

== Awards ==
Over the course of her service Henrico's crew were eligible to receive the following awards:

- Combat Action Ribbon
- Navy Unit Commendation
- Meritorious Unit Commendation
- China Service Medal
- American Area Campaign Medal
- European African Middle Eastern Campaign Medal (3)
- Asiatic Pacific Campaign Medal
- World War II Victory Medal
- National Defense Service Medal (2)
- Korean War Service Medal (9)
- Armed Forces Expeditionary Medal (7)
- Vietnam Service Medal (2)
- Republic of Vietnam Gallantry Cross Unit Citation (3)
- United Nations Service Medal
- Republic of Vietnam Campaign Medal
- Republic of Korea War Service Medal (retroactive)
- Philippine Presidential Unit Citation (retroactive)
- Philippine Liberation Medal
