= List of ship launches in 1976 =

The list of ship launches in 1976 includes a chronological list of ships launched in 1976. In cases where no official launching ceremony was held, the date built or completed may be used instead.

Date	Ship	Class and type	Builder	Location	Country	Notes
6 January	John Young	Spruance-class destroyer	Ingalls Shipbuilding	Pascagoula, Mississippi	United States	For United States Navy.
17 January	Rollnes	Bulk carrier	Appledore Shipbuilders Ltd.	Appledore	United Kingdom	For Hambros Bank Ltd.
27 January	Lepeta	Supertanker	Harland & Wolff	Belfast	United Kingdom	For Shell Tanker Ltd.
1 February	Rose City	San Clemente-class oil tanker		San Diego, California	United States	
21 February	Omaha	Los Angeles-class submarine	Electric Boat	Groton, Connecticut	United States	For United States Navy.
1 March	Ghanadhah	Ardhana-class patrol craft	Vosper Thornycroft	Portsmouth	United Kingdom	For United Arab Emirates Navy.
20 March	Southgate	Bulk carrier	Appledore Shipbuilders Ltd.	Appledore	United Kingdom	For Park Steamships Ltd.
26 March	Comte de Grasse	Spruance-class destroyer	Ingalls Shipbuilding	Pascagoula, Mississippi	United States	For United States Navy.
28 March	Finnjet	Cruiseferry	Wärtsilä Helsinki Shipyard	Helsinki	Finland	For Finnlines.
3 April	Memphis	Los Angeles-class submarine	Newport News Shipbuilding	Newport News, Virginia	United States	For United States Navy.
14 April	Glasgow	Type 42 destroyer	Swan Hunter	Wallsend	United Kingdom	For Royal Navy.
12 May	Broadsword	Type 22 frigate	Yarrow Shipbuilders	Scotstoun	United Kingdom	For Royal Navy.
17 May	Exegarth	Firefighting tug	Beverley Shipbuilding & Engineering Co. Ltd	Beverley	United Kingdom	For Rea Towing Co. Ltd.
26 May	Bonn	Type "Europatanker" Ultra Large Crude Carrier		Bremen	West Germany	For Kosmos Bulkschiffahrt
28 May	Sandgate	Bulk carrier	Appledore Shipbuilders Ltd.	Appledore	United Kingdom	For Turnbull Scott Shipping Co. Ltd.
25 June	Batillus	Batillus-class supertanker	Chantiers de l'Atlantique	Nantes	France	
2 July	Leonia	Supertanker	Harland & Wolff	Belfast	United Kingdom	For Shell Tankers Ltd.
8 July	O'Brien	Spruance-class destroyer	Ingalls Shipbuilding	Pascagoula, Mississippi	United States	For United States Navy.
9 July	Miranda Guinness	Tanker	Charles Hill & Sons Ltd.	Bristol	United Kingdom	For Arthur Guinness & Sons (Dublin) Ltd.
26 July	Al Wafi	Patrol boat	Brooke Marine Ltd.	Lowestoft	United Kingdom	For Royal Omani Navy.
31 July	Mississippi	Virginia-class cruiser	Newport News Shipbuilding	Newport News, Virginia	United States	For United States Navy.
14 August	Retivyy	Project 1135 large anti-submarine ship	Severnaya Verf	Leningrad	Soviet Union	For Soviet Navy.
27 August	Green Park	Bulk carrier	Appledore Shipbuilders Ltd.	Appledore	United Kingdom	For Park Steamships Ltd.
27 August	Transgermania	Ferry	J. J. Sietas	Hamburg	West Germany	Poseidon Schiffahrts OHG.
1 September	Merrill	Spruance-class destroyer	Ingalls Shipbuilding	Pascagoula, Mississippi	United States	For United States Navy.
25 September	Oliver Hazard Perry	Oliver Hazard Perry-class frigate	Bath Iron Works	Bath, Maine	United States	For United States Navy.
28 September	Lunni	Product tanker	Nobiskrug	Rendsburg	West Germany	
6 October	Shyri	Type 209 submarine	Howaldtswerke-Deutsche Werft	Kiel	West Germany	For Ecuadorian Navy.
9 October	Groton	Los Angeles-class submarine	Electric Boat	Groton, Connecticut	United States	For United States Navy.
8 November	Al Fulk	Patrol boat	Brooke Marine Ltd.	Lowestoft	United Kingdom	For Royal Omani Navy.
13 November	Carvajal	Lupo-class frigate	Servicio Industrial de la Marina	Callao	Peru	For Peruvian Navy.
19 November	Meerkatze	Fishery protection vessel	Lürssen	Bremen	West Germany	For Bundesanstalt für Landwirtschaft und Ernährung.
20 November	Sceptre	Swiftsure-class submarine	Vickers Limited Shipbuilding Group	Barrow-in-Furness	United Kingdom	For Royal Navy.
1 December	Jebba	Patrol boat	Brooke Marine Ltd.	Lowestoft	United Kingdom	For Nigerian Navy.
4 December	Wahran	Type "Europatanker" Ultra Large Crude Carrier	AG Weser	Bremen	West Germany	For Arab Maritime Petroleum Transport Company
11 December	Lima	Supertanker	Harland & Wolff	Belfast	United Kingdom	For Shell Tankers Ltd.
17 December	Georges Leygues	Georges Leygues-class frigate			France	For French Navy.
18 December	Kortenaer	Kortenaer-class frigate	Rijn-Schelde Machinefabrieken en Scheepswerven	Vlissingen	Netherlands	For Royal Netherlands Navy.
22 December	Mercia Shore	Offshore supply vessel	Appledore Shipbuilders Ltd.	Appledore	United Kingdom	For Offshore Marine Ltd.
23 December	Noshiro	Chikugo-class destroyer escort			Japan	For Japanese Navy.
28 December	Briscoe	Spruance-class destroyer	Ingalls Shipbuilding	Pascagoula, Mississippi	United States	For United States Navy.
Unknown date	Cross Rip	Ferry			United States	For Hy-Line.
Unknown date	Esso Japan	Supertanker	Hitachi Zosen Corporation	Osaka	Japan	For Esso
Unknown date	Thalassa Desgagnes	Double-hulled tanker			Norway	For Groupe Desgagné.
