= Submarine Launched Mobile Mines =

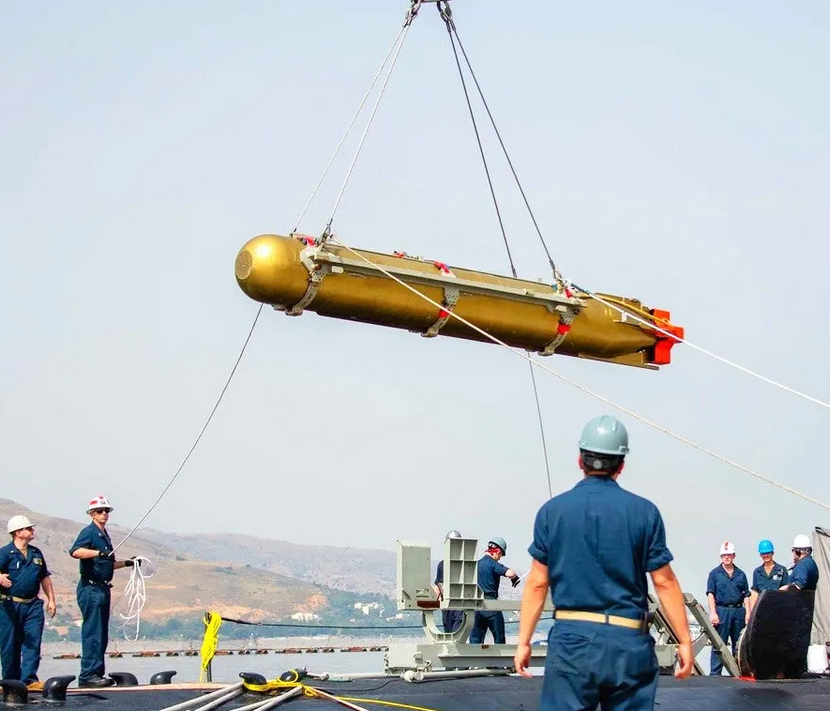
- A Mk 67 Submarine Launched Mobile Mine being loaded onto the USS Montpelier in Crete Naval Base, Greece, 2021
- Type: Naval mine
- Place of origin: United States

Service history
- In service: 1979–present
- Used by: United States Navy

Production history
- Produced: 1979

Specifications
- Mass: 1,765 pounds (800 kg)
- Length: 13 feet (4 m)
- Warhead: Conventional high explosive
- Warhead weight: 330 pounds (150 kg)
- Detonation mechanism: Magnetic/seismic/pressure target detection
- Engine: Electric motor
- Operational range: Approx. 8 miles (13 km)
- Launch platform: Submarine

Submarine Launched Mobile Mines (SLMM) are a modern type of naval mine designed to be deployed by submarines. The chief example is the Mark 67 SLMM, currently used by the United States Navy and capable of deployment on 688i Los Angeles-class submarines. These mines offer a strategic advantage by allowing for clandestine deployment in hostile or denied areas, such as ports or shipping lanes, making them difficult to detect and counter.

== Development and Design ==
The Mk 67 SLMM was first deployed in 1979, based on the design of the Mk 37 torpedo. The SLMMs are designed to be launched from standard submarine torpedo tubes and are capable of traveling several thousand yards to their target location. Their propulsion system allows for precise placement in areas inaccessible to other types of mines.

The Mk 67 is 13 feet long, weighs 1,765 pounds, and carries a 330-pound high-explosive charge. The mine is detonated by a combination of magnetic, seismic, and pressure sensors, making it effective against both surface vessels and submarines. The depth range for the SLMMs is up to 600 feet.

== Operational Use ==
SLMMs have been a part of the U.S. Navy's mine warfare arsenal since 1983. These mines can be deployed in shallow waters, which makes them effective for denying access to strategic locations such as ports and harbors. One of the key advantages of submarine-launched mines is the ability to deploy them covertly, significantly reducing the risk of detection compared to surface or air-launched mines.

In recent years, the U.S. Navy has conducted several exercises to test and refine SLMM capabilities. For example, in June 2021, the USS Montpelier conducted mine-loading exercises with dummy Mk 67 SLMMs in Souda Bay, Greece. These exercises reflected the importance of SLMMs in the Mediterranean region, where naval tensions are high due to the presence of Russian submarines and other regional powers.

As of 2023, only 688i ("improved") Los Angeles-class attack submarines in the U.S. Navy are capable of deploying the Mk 67 SLMM. The limited number of suitable launch platforms and mine inventories restricts the scale of potential SLMM operations.

== Future designs ==
An Improved Submarine Launched Mobile Mine (ISLMM) based on the Mark 48 torpedo was being developed, but is dormant due to lack of funding.
