= USS Hyman G. Rickover (SSN-709) =

Los Angeles-class nuclear-powered attack submarine of the US Navy

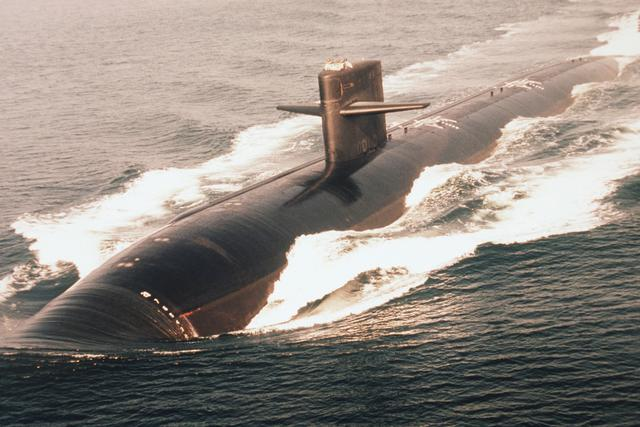
- USS Hyman G. Rickover underway

History

United States
- Name: USS Hyman G. Rickover
- Awarded: 10 December 1973
- Builder: General Dynamics Corporation
- Laid down: 24 July 1981
- Launched: 27 August 1983
- Commissioned: 21 July 1984
- Decommissioned: 14 December 2006
- Stricken: 14 December 2006
- Home port: Norfolk, Virginia
- Motto: Committed To Excellence
- Fate: Scrapped as of 25 November 2025
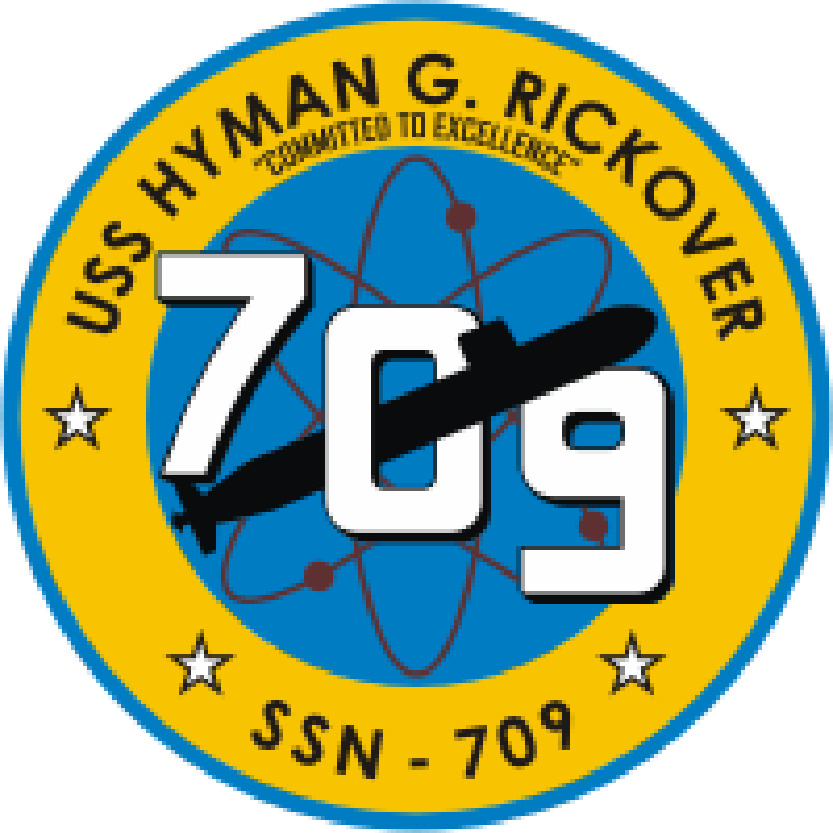
- Badge

General characteristics
- Class & type: Los Angeles-class submarine
- Displacement: 5,748 tons light, 6,123 tons full, 375 tons dead
- Length: 110.3 m (361 ft 11 in)
- Beam: 10 m (32 ft 10 in)
- Draft: 9.7 m (31 ft 10 in)
- Propulsion: S6G nuclear reactor
- Complement: 12 officers, 98 enlisted
- Armament: 4 × 21 in (533 mm) torpedo tubes

USS Hyman G. Rickover (SSN-709), a Los Angeles-class submarine, was the first ship of the United States Navy to be named for Admiral Hyman G. Rickover, pioneer of the nuclear Navy, and the only Los Angeles-class submarine not named after a United States city or town. She was initially to be named USS Providence; however, following the retirement of Admiral Rickover, her name was reassigned prior to official christening. SSN-719 was later given the name USS Providence.

The contract to build her was awarded to the Electric Boat Division of General Dynamics Corporation in Groton, Connecticut on 10 December 1973 and her keel was laid down on 24 July 1981. She was launched on 27 August 1983 sponsored by the Admiral's wife, Mrs. Eleonore Ann Bednowicz Rickover. Hyman G. Rickover was commissioned on 21 July 1984.

== Ship's crest ==
The ship's crest was designed by the wife of a former crewmember, it symbolically represents Admiral Rickover and the boat.

The four white stars symbolize Admiral Rickover's rank upon retirement. The submarine's upward angle represents seeking out our nation's enemies. The nuclear power symbol is a reminder that Admiral Rickover is father of the nuclear Navy, and the motto, "Committed to Excellence" symbolizes the Admiral's 64 years of active naval service.

== Service ==
During the months of January through April 1984 Hyman G. Rickover was nearing the completion of her construction. The initial manning was completed in January. Initial criticality of the ship's S6G reactor was achieved on 10 March 1984. Berthing and messing areas were completed in April and, on 23 April 1984, the crew moved aboard the ship. A special meal of ribeye steaks, baked potatoes, and corn on the cob was served to commemorate the occasion.

The ship was placed into service on 24 April 1984 and initial sea trials began on 16 May 1984 with Admiral Kinnaird R. McKee aboard. Admiral McKee served as Director of the Office of Naval Nuclear Propulsion, United States Department of Energy. The sea trials were completed smartly and in the shortest time ever for a 688-class submarine built at Electric Boat. Admiral McKee complimented the crew on their fine performance prior to his departure.

At exactly 12:08, 21 July 1984 Hyman G. Rickover was placed in commission by the commissioning officer Vice Admiral Bernard M. Kauderer, Commander Submarine Force, U.S. Atlantic Fleet. The ceremony was held in a downpour at Submarine Base Groton, Conn., and was well attended despite the weather and the one-hour delay due to the late arrival of U.S. Representative Charles E. Bennett of Florida, the principal speaker.

Hyman G. Rickover was featured prominently in the documentary "Submarine: Steel Boats-Iron Men" filmed in 1989 and aired in November 1991.

Hyman G. Rickover was inactivated on 14 December 2006 and was transported to Portsmouth Naval Shipyard in Kittery, Maine, in 2007 for the year-long inactivation process. Hyman G. Rickover was decommissioned in 2007, with the crew departing for the final time on 17 December 2007. The submarine was towed the next year to Puget Sound Naval Shipyard, where she was eventually scrapped as of 25 November 2025.

== Awards ==

Navy Unit Commendation (×2)	Navy Meritorious Unit Commendation (×3)	Battle Effectiveness Award (×4)
Navy Expeditionary Medal (×2)	National Defense Service Medal (×2)	Global War on Terrorism Service Medal
Armed Forces Service Medal	Sea Service Deployment Ribbon (×10)	Navy Arctic Service Ribbon
