= USS Baltimore (SSN-704) =

Los Angeles-class nuclear-powered attack submarine of the US Navy

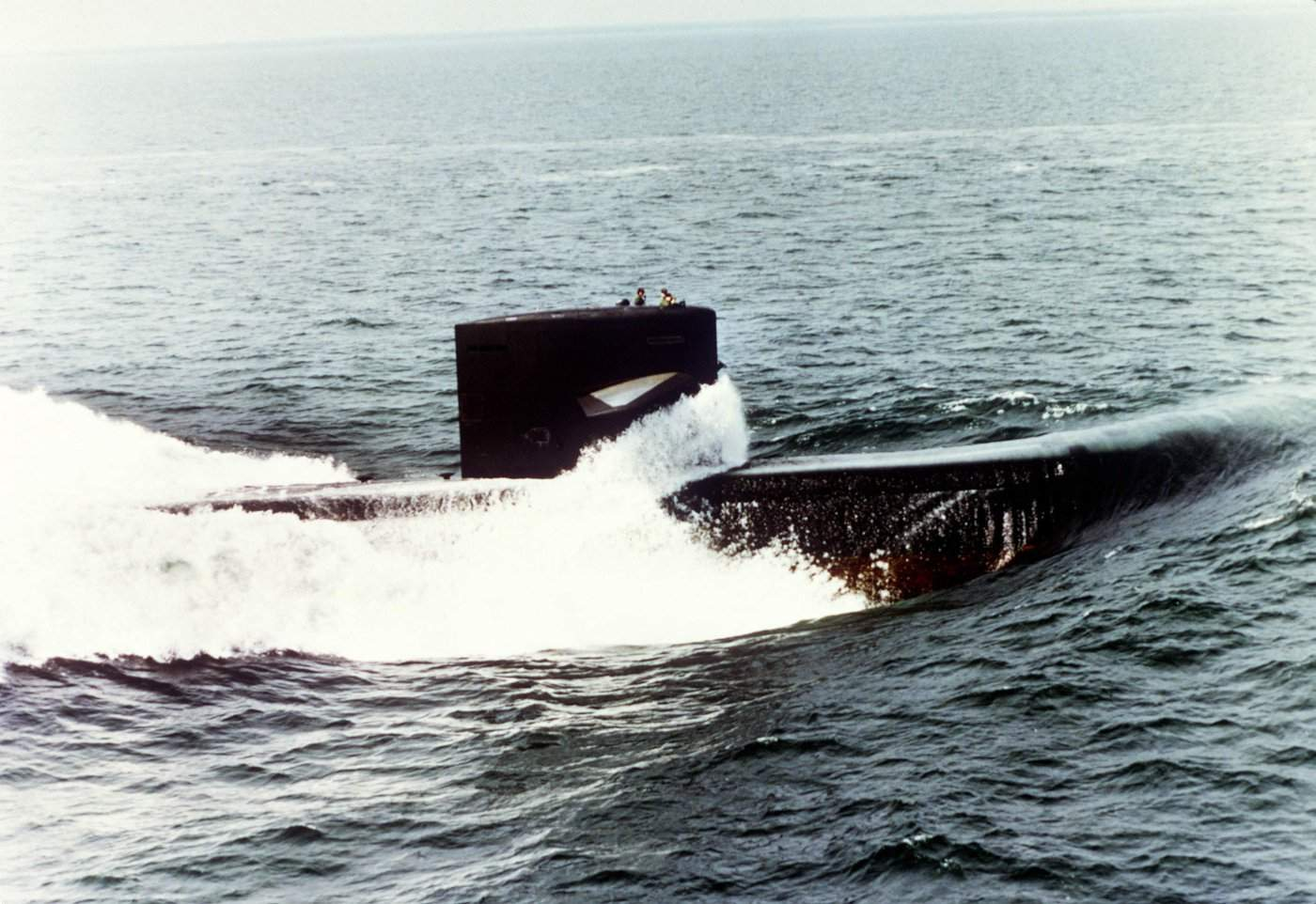
- USS Baltimore (SSN-704) underway in moderate seas. Notice the trough beneath the sail.

History

United States
- Name: USS Baltimore
- Awarded: 31 October 1973
- Builder: General Dynamics Corporation
- Laid down: 21 May 1979
- Launched: 13 December 1980
- Sponsored by: the Honorable Marjorie S. Holt
- Commissioned: 24 July 1982
- Decommissioned: 10 July 1998
- Stricken: 10 July 1998
- Motto: From Sails to Atoms
- Fate: Recycled as of 30 November 2017
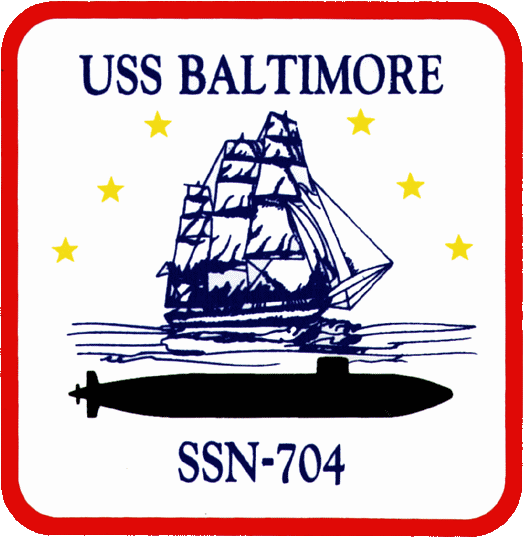
- Badge

General characteristics
- Class & type: Los Angeles-class submarine
- Tonnage: 6900
- Displacement: 5,714 tons light, 6,087 tons full, 373 tons dead
- Length: 110.3 m (361 ft 11 in)
- Beam: 10 m (32 ft 10 in)
- Draft: 9.7 m (31 ft 10 in)
- Depth: over 800 ft (240 m)
- Decks: 3
- Installed power: Nuclear (Light Water Reactor)
- Propulsion: S6G nuclear reactor
- Speed: over 25 knots (46 km/h)
- Complement: 12 officers and 98 enlisted
- Sensors & processing systems: BQQ 5D
- Armament: 4 × 21 in (533 mm) torpedo tubes

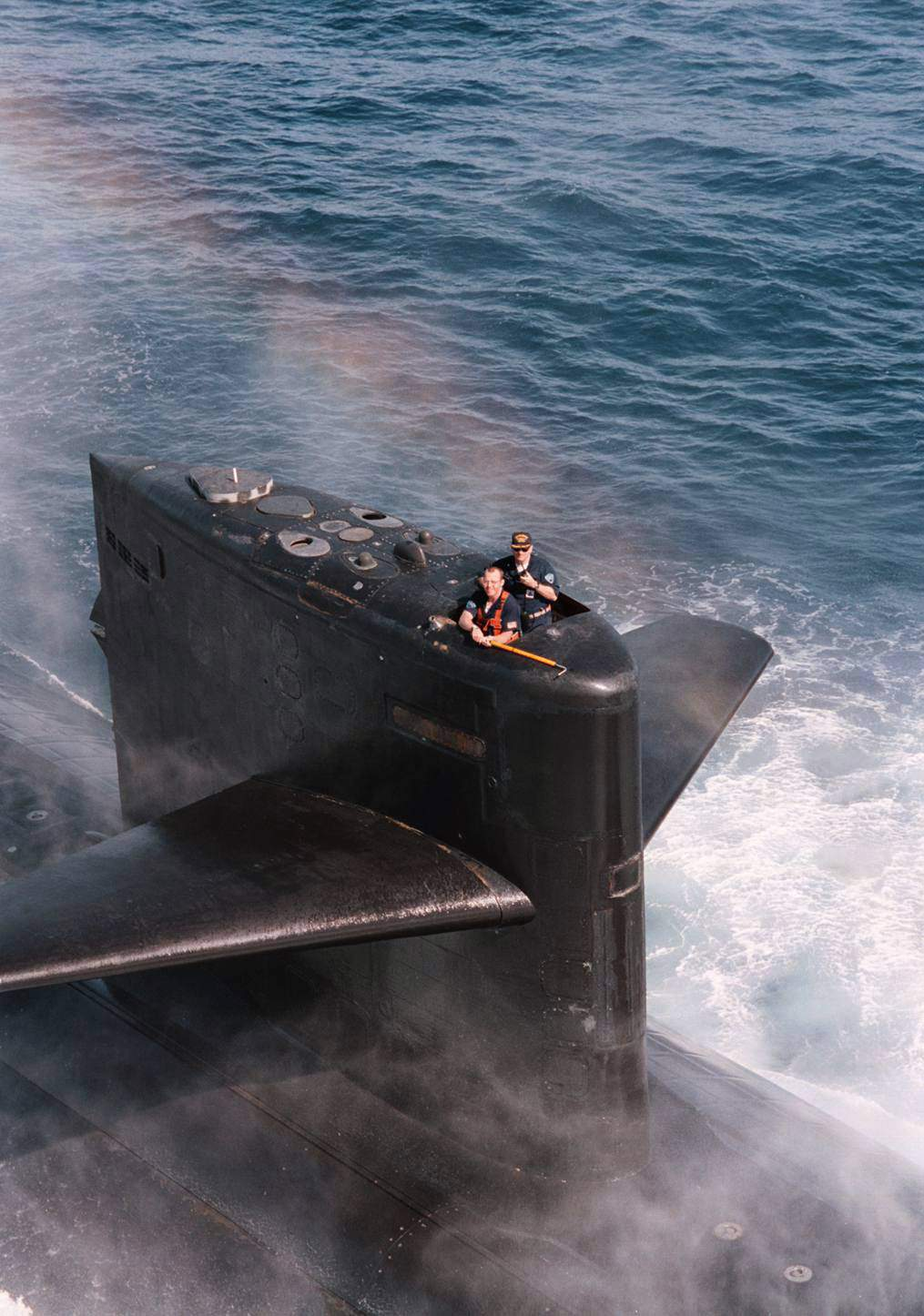
Baltimore during a VERTREP while underway

USS Baltimore (SSN-704), a Los Angeles-class nuclear-powered attack submarine, was the sixth ship of the United States Navy to be named for Baltimore, Maryland. The contract to build her was awarded to the Electric Boat Division of General Dynamics Corporation in Groton, Connecticut on 31 October 1973 and her keel was laid down on 21 May 1979. She was launched on 13 December 1980 sponsored by Congresswoman Marjorie S. Holt, and commissioned on 24 July 1982. The vessel's logo was "From Sails to Atoms," as inscribed on the ships original plaque.

Baltimore was decommissioned and stricken from the Naval Vessel Register on 10 July 1998. Ex-Baltimore was disposed of through the Nuclear Powered Ship and Submarine Recycling Program in Bremerton, Washington as of 30 November 2017.
