= USS Cincinnati (SSN-693) =

Los Angeles-class nuclear-powered attack submarine of the US Navy

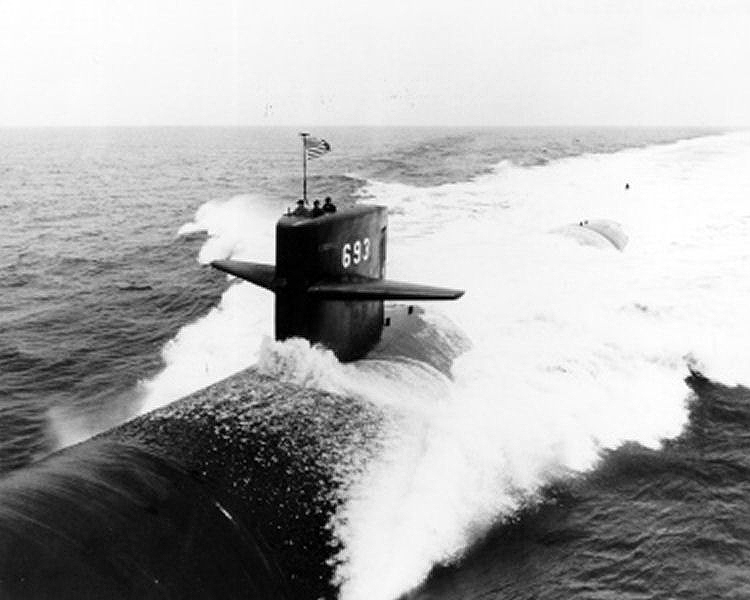
- Cincinnati underway

History

United States
- Name: USS Cincinnati
- Awarded: 4 February 1971
- Builder: Newport News Shipbuilding
- Laid down: 6 April 1974
- Launched: 19 February 1977
- Commissioned: 10 June 1978
- Decommissioned: 29 July 1995
- Stricken: 29 July 1995
- Fate: Disposed of by submarine recycling
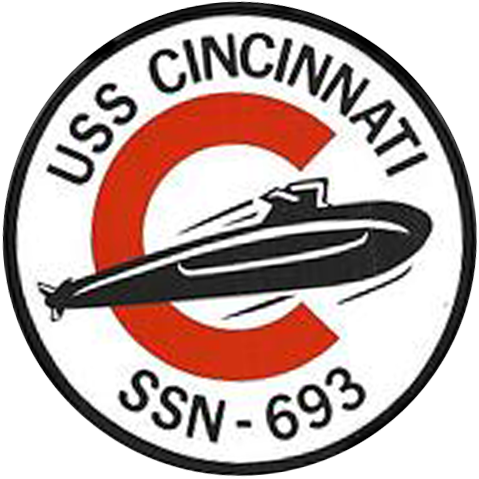
- Badge

General characteristics
- Class & type: Los Angeles-class submarine
- Displacement: 5,767 long tons (5,860 t) light; 6,151 long tons (6,250 t) full; 384 tons dead
- Length: 110.3 m (361 ft 11 in)
- Beam: 10 m (32 ft 10 in)
- Draft: 9.4 m (30 ft 10 in)
- Propulsion: S6G nuclear reactor, 2 turbines, 35,000 hp (26,000 kW); 1 auxiliary motor 325 hp (242 kW), 1 shaft
- Speed: 15 knots (28 km/h) surfaced; 32 knots (59 km/h) submerged
- Test depth: 290 m (950 ft)
- Complement: 12 officers; 98 enlisted
- Armament: 4 × 21 in (533 mm) bow torpedo tubes

USS Cincinnati (SSN-693), a Los Angeles-class submarine, was the fourth ship of the United States Navy to be named for Cincinnati, Ohio. The contract to build her was awarded to Newport News Shipbuilding and Dry Dock Company in Newport News, Virginia on 4 February 1971 and her keel was laid down on 6 April 1974. She was launched on 19 February 1977 sponsored by Mrs. William J. Keating, and commissioned on 10 June 1978.

In August 1979, Cincinnati rescued a Finnish sailor 70 miles (110 km) off the east coast of Florida who had been in the water for 22 hours after falling overboard from the Finnish freighter Finnbeaver.

In November 1980, after a patrol in the Mediterranean Sea, Cincinnati was visited by former President of the United States Richard M. Nixon and Admiral Hyman Rickover.

In 1981, Cincinnati, under the command of Commander Kurt T. Juroff USN, conducted an around the world cruise, steaming 60,000 miles and operating in the Indian Ocean. From 8–13 June 1981 Cincinnati visited Western Australia, docking at HMAS Stirling, Rockingham for an R&R visit.

Cincinnati was decommissioned and stricken from the Naval Vessel Register on 29 July 1995. Ex-Cincinnati was scheduled to enter the Nuclear Powered Ship and Submarine Recycling Program in Bremerton, Washington. After an attempt made to preserve her as a museum and memorial in her namesake city failed, the city now plans on acquiring the sail and other artifacts for display on the riverfront. Update: Pieces of the USS Cincinnati to be installed as a cold war memorial at VOA Park West Chester Ohio. (SUBCINCY.ORG)

A portion of the submarine, the nuclear reactor compartment, was transported via river barge to Hanford, Washington in September 2014 for disposal.
