= USS Pittsburgh (SSN-720) =

Los Angeles-class nuclear-powered attack submarine of the US Navy

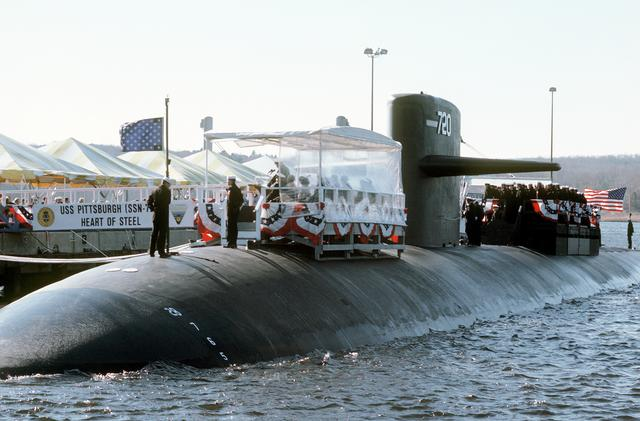
- USS Pittsburgh at her commissioning ceremony in 1985.

History

United States
- Name: USS Pittsburgh
- Namesake: The City of Pittsburgh, Pennsylvania
- Awarded: 16 April 1979
- Builder: General Dynamics Electric Boat
- Laid down: 15 April 1983
- Launched: 8 December 1984
- Commissioned: 23 November 1985
- Decommissioned: 15 April 2020
- Out of service: 6 August 2019
- Home port: Groton, Connecticut
- Motto: Heart of Steel
- Status: Decommissioned
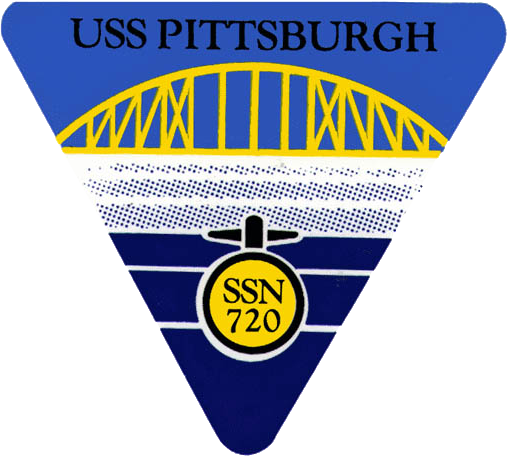
- Badge

General characteristics
- Class & type: Los Angeles-class submarine
- Displacement: 5,802 long tons (5,895 t) light; 6,193 long tons (6,292 t) full; 391 long tons (397 t) dead
- Length: 110.3 m (361 ft 11 in)
- Beam: 10 m (32 ft 10 in)
- Draft: 9.4 m (30 ft 10 in)
- Propulsion: 1 × S6G PWR nuclear reactor with D2W core (165 MW), HEU 93.5%; 2 × steam turbines (33,500) shp; 1 × shaft; 1 × secondary propulsion motor 325 hp (242 kW)
- Speed: Surfaced:20 knots (23 mph; 37 km/h); Submerged: +20 knots (23 mph; 37 km/h) (official)
- Complement: 12 officers, 98 men
- Sensors & processing systems: BQQ-5 passive sonar, BQS-15 detecting and ranging sonar, WLR-8 fire control radar receiver, WLR-9 acoustic receiver for detection of active search sonar and acoustic homing torpedoes, BRD-7 radio direction finder
- Armament: 4 × 21 in (533 mm) bow tubes, 10 Mk48 ADCAP torpedo reloads, Tomahawk land attack missile block 3 SLCM range 1,700 nautical miles (3,100 km), Harpoon anti–surface ship missile range 70 nautical miles (130 km), mine laying Mk67 mobile Mk60 captor mines

USS Pittsburgh (SSN-720) is a Los Angeles-class submarine and is the fourth ship of the United States Navy to be named for Pittsburgh, Pennsylvania.

== History ==
The contract to build Pittsburgh was awarded to the Electric Boat Division of General Dynamics Corporation in Groton, Connecticut, on 16 April 1979, and her keel was laid down on 15 April 1983. She was launched on 8 December 1984 and commissioned on 23 November 1985.

On 2 April 1991 Pittsburgh and Louisville conducted submarine-launched Tomahawk missile attacks against Iraq during Operation Desert Storm.

Pittsburgh departed in October 2002 for a deployment to the Mediterranean Sea. There, she again fired Tomahawk missiles into Iraq during Operation Iraqi Freedom. She returned on 27 April 2003.

On 25 February 2019, Pittsburgh returned to her homeport at Naval Submarine Base New London after completion of her final deployment. The submarine then arrived at Bremerton, Washington on 28 May 2019, for a months-long inactivation and decommissioning process.

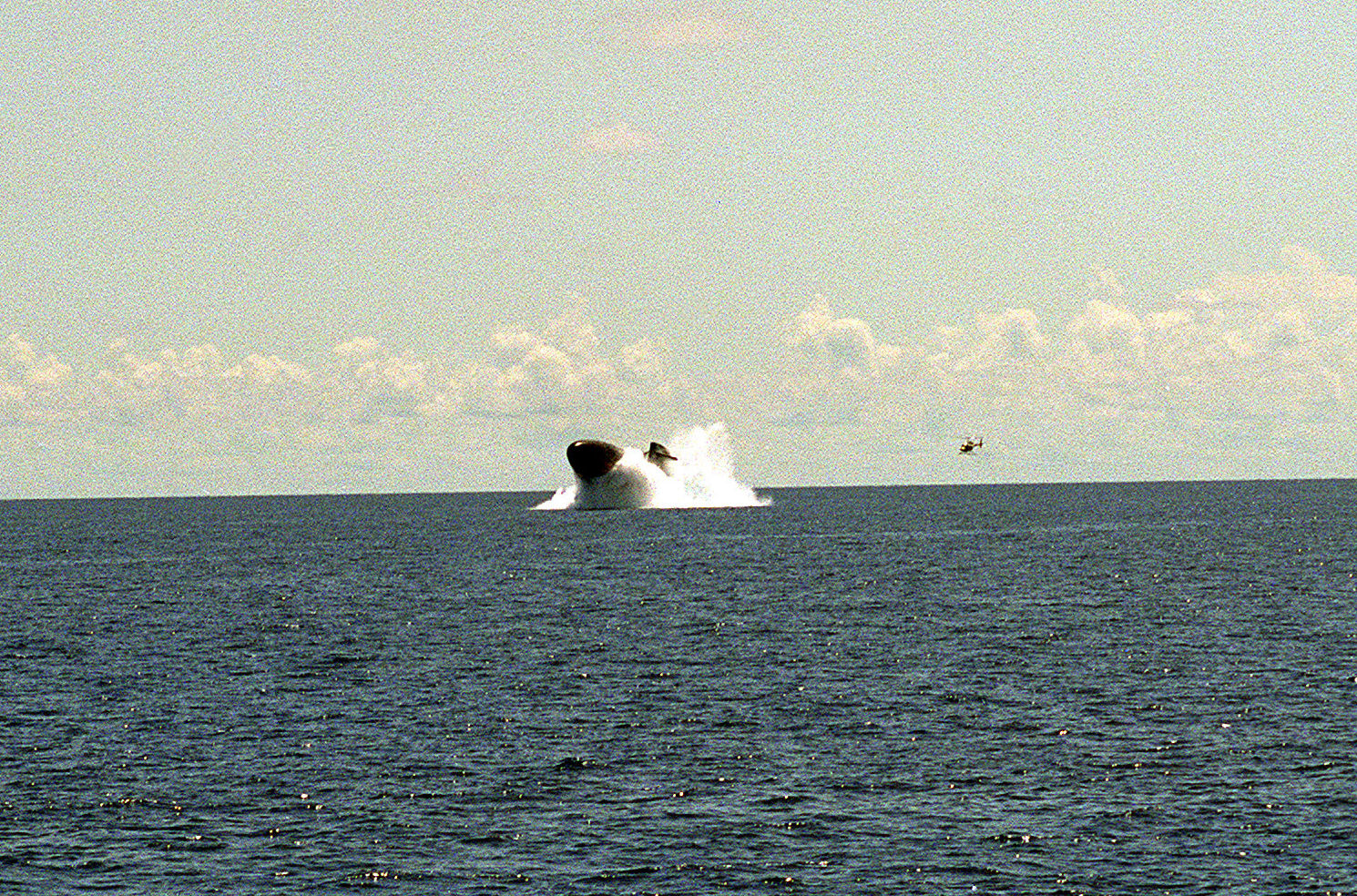
USS Pittsburgh demonstrates an emergency main ballast tank blow in 1991.

Pittsburgh was officially deactivated on 17 January 2020 at the Undersea Warfare Museum in Keyport, Washington, and awaited the Submarine Recycling Program at Puget Sound Naval Shipyard in Bremerton, Washington. She was later decommissioned on 15 April 2020 and the crew released, exactly 37 years after her keel was laid down.
