= USS Jefferson City =

Los Angeles-class nuclear-powered attack submarine of the US Navy

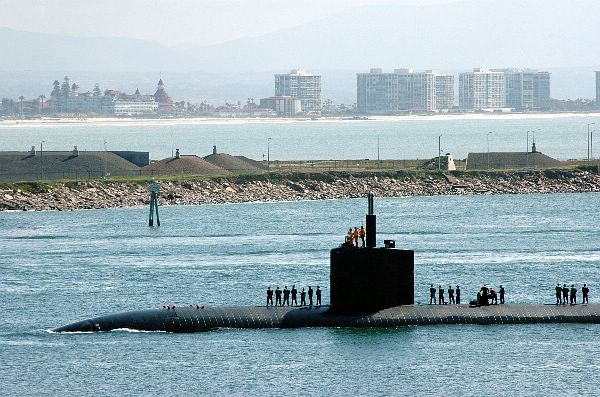
- USS Jefferson City (SSN-759)

History

United States
- Name: USS Jefferson City
- Namesake: The City of Jefferson City, Missouri
- Awarded: 26 November 1984
- Builder: Newport News Shipbuilding and Drydock Company
- Laid down: 21 September 1987
- Launched: 17 August 1990
- Commissioned: 29 February 1992
- Home port: Naval Base Guam
- Motto: When Any Exigence Calls
- Status: in active service
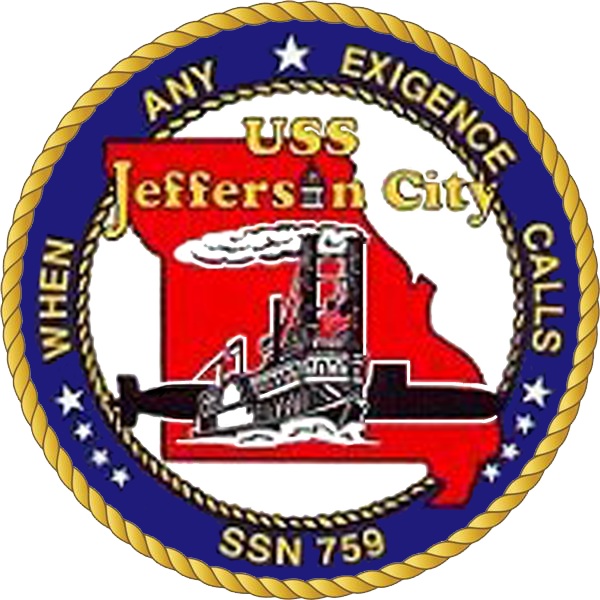
- Badge

General characteristics
- Class & type: Los Angeles-class submarine
- Displacement: 6,000 long tons (6,096 t) light; 6,927 long tons (7,038 t) full; 927 long tons (942 t) dead
- Length: 110.3 m (361 ft 11 in)
- Beam: 10 m (32 ft 10 in)
- Draft: 9.4 m (30 ft 10 in)
- Propulsion: 1 × S6G PWR nuclear reactor with D2W core (165 MW), HEU 93.5%; 2 × steam turbines (33,500) shp; 1 × shaft; 1 × secondary propulsion motor 325 hp (242 kW)
- Speed: Surfaced:20 knots (23 mph; 37 km/h); Submerged: +20 knots (23 mph; 37 km/h) (official)
- Complement: 12 officers, 98 men
- Sensors & processing systems: AN/BQQ-5 active/passive suite sonar, BQS-15 detecting and ranging sonar, WLR-8 fire control radar receiver, WLR-9 acoustic receiver for detection of active search sonar and acoustic homing torpedoes, BRD-7 radio direction finder
- Armament: 4 × 21 in (533 mm) bow tubes, 10 Mk48 ADCAP torpedo reloads, Tomahawk land attack missile block 3 SLCM range 1,700 nautical miles (3,100 km), Harpoon anti–surface ship missile range 70 nautical miles (130 km), mine laying Mk67 mobile Mk60 captor mines

USS Jefferson City (SSN-759), a Los Angeles-class submarine, is the only ship of the United States Navy to be named for Jefferson City, Missouri. The contract to build her was awarded to Newport News Shipbuilding and Dry Dock Company in Newport News, Virginia on 26 November 1984 and her keel was laid down on 21 September 1987. She was launched on 17 August 1990 sponsored by Mrs. Susan A. Skelton, and commissioned on 29 February 1992, with Commander Russell Harris in command.

Jefferson City launched two Block III Tomahawks as part of a strike on Iraq on 3 September 1996.

Homeport is the Joint Base Pearl Harbor–Hickam.
