= USS Phoenix (SSN-702) =

Los Angeles-class nuclear-powered attack submarine of the US Navy

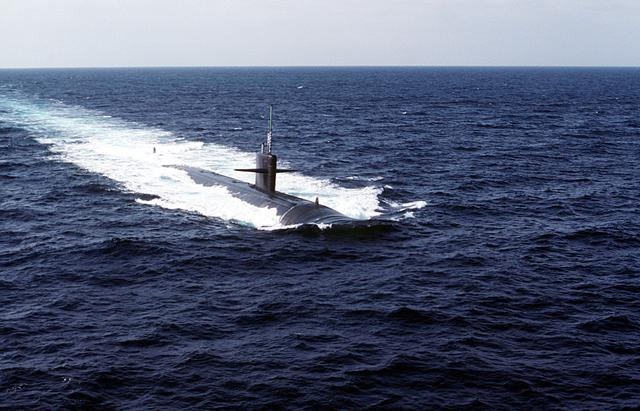
- USS Phoenix underway

History

United States
- Name: USS Phoenix
- Namesake: Phoenix, Arizona
- Awarded: 31 October 1973
- Builder: General Dynamics Corporation
- Cost: $ 700,000,000
- Laid down: 30 July 1977
- Launched: 8 December 1979
- Commissioned: 19 December 1981
- Decommissioned: 29 July 1998
- Stricken: 29 July 1998
- Fate: Disposed of by submarine recycling. Sail preserved in Phoenix, Arizona
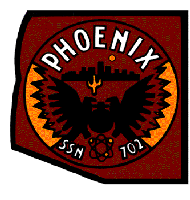
- Badge

General characteristics
- Class & type: Los Angeles-class submarine
- Displacement: 5,777 tons light, 6,148 tons full, 371 tons dead
- Length: 110.3 m (361 ft 11 in)
- Beam: 10 m (32 ft 10 in)
- Draft: 9.7 m (31 ft 10 in)
- Propulsion: S6G nuclear reactor
- Complement: 12 officers, 98 enlisted
- Armament: 4 × 21 in (533 mm) torpedo tubes; MK.48 ADCAP torpedoes; Tomahawk Land Attack cruise missile (TLAM); MK60 mines; MK67 SLMM mines

USS Phoenix (SSN-702), a Los Angeles-class submarine, was the fifth ship of the United States Navy to be named "Phoenix" and the third to be named after the city, Phoenix, Arizona (the first two were named after the mythological bird). The contract to build her was awarded to the Electric Boat Division of General Dynamics Corporation in Groton, Connecticut, on 31 October 1973, and her keel was laid down on 30 July 1977. She was launched on 8 December 1979, sponsored by Mrs. Betty Harvey Rhodes, wife of Congressman John J. Rhodes, and commissioned on 19 December 1981.

Phoenix was assigned to Submarine Squadron Eight, home ported in Norfolk, Virginia, where she remained for 16 years. Phoenix spent the first years following her commissioning and Post Shakedown Availability (PSA) conducting several vital deployments and exercises. Highlighting 1983 was a deployment during which she operated in support of the USS Carl Vinson Battle Group, performed oceanographic surveys, and conducted independent anti-submarine warfare (ASW) operations. During the cruise, Phoenix made a port visit to HMAS Stirling, Western Australia, in July 1983, and Auckland New Zealand in November 1983 sparking anti-nuclear protests https://navymuseum.co.nz/bomb-gone_gallery/uss-phoenix-protest-photographs/ then transited the Panama Canal eastward en route to Norfolk to complete her record-setting 203-day, 65,000-mile (105,000 km) circumnavigation of the globe.

In the beginning of 1984, Phoenix conducted a major upkeep period followed by her being the first Los Angeles-class submarine to complete a Consolidated Anti-Submarine Readiness Test (CART). In August, following a Selective Restricted Availability (SRA), Phoenix fired 25 exercise torpedoes while conducting Prospective Commanding Officer (PCO) Operations and then successfully completed an unannounced Operational Reactor Safeguards Examination (ORSE). In November, Phoenix received the highest possible Tactical Effectiveness Factor during a Tactical Readiness Evaluation (TRE).

During the better part of 1985 and early 1986, Phoenix conducted four highly successful ASW missions in the Mediterranean Sea and North Atlantic Ocean, for which the crew was subsequently awarded the Meritorious Unit Commendation. Phoenix also participated in a major NATO exercise, completed an ORSE, and received a grade of "Excellent" during a Supply Management Inspection (SMI). Phoenix was awarded the Submarine Squadron Eight Communications "Green C" for her outstanding communications performance during 1985.

During 1986, Phoenix's success continued as she and her crew exhibited extreme professionalism and operational proficiency while participating in a major Fleet Exercise (FLEETEX) and PCO Operations. After a superb performance on an ORSE, the ship was designated a "Top Performer" for her accomplishments during a TRE. The year came to a close with the Supply Department receiving the Submarine Squadron Eight "Blue E" for excellence in Supply Management during 1986.

1987 saw Phoenix on deployment from February to May, for which the ship was awarded her second Meritorious Unit Commendation. This was followed by a stand down for the crew. The ship then conducted Midshipman training, torpedo proficiency firings, and type training to round out the summer. Following the successful completion of a TRE and an ORSE, the Medical Department was recognized as the best in the squadron and was awarded the Medical "Yellow M."

After completing torpedo proficiency firings and MK-48 Advanced Capability (ADCAP) Torpedo testing in early 1988, Phoenix once again conducted PCO Operations and participated in a major FLEETEX. Phoenix had the highest percentage of "hits" and "sinkings" of any other submarine participating in the exercises. After an ORSE in November, Phoenix remained in port to close out the year.

In 1989, Phoenix spent the majority of her time in Norfolk Naval Shipyard for a Depot Modernization Period (DMP) during which substantial portions of the fire control and sonar Systems were upgraded and the propulsion plant was significantly enhanced.

In early 1990, Phoenix completed the DMP and Post DMP Sea Trials. This was followed by Midshipman training and Sonar/Fire Control System Certification. The year was brought to a close after participating in a FLEETEX and successfully completing an ORSE.

During February 1991, Phoenix conducted a TRE and then began a Pre-Overseas Movement (POM) workup. Following POM Certification, Phoenix departed for the Mediterranean Sea where she conducted numerous independent operations and was presented with the prestigious Commander Sixth Fleet "Hook 'Em" award for ASW excellence. Demonstrating the many roles of the fast attack submarine, she became the first SSN to deploy as an integral part of a Carrier Battle Group and conducted numerous exercises with USS Forrestal.

Aside from conducting various local operations and Independent Steaming Exercises (ISE) in 1992, Phoenix underwent an SRA to upgrade weapons and sensor systems. During June and July, Phoenix performed an ORSE, a TRE, and a Nuclear Technical Weapons Proficiency Inspection (NTPI). Phoenix was presented with the Submarine Squadron Eight Tactical "T" Award as a testament to her war fighting readiness and effectiveness.

From April to May 1993, Phoenix conducted a deployment to the North Atlantic Ocean. She also performed well on her annual TRE, ORSE, and SMI. Hard work by the crew in preservation of the topside area and gear did not go unnoticed, as they were awarded the Submarine Squadron Eight Deck Seamanship "D" Award.

During 1994, Phoenix was deployed to the Northern Atlantic Ocean on two separate occasions for a total of six months. A September ORSE balanced the ship's operational and training schedules for the year. Phoenix received her third Meritorious Unit Commendation for superb performance during January 1994 through March 1995 and Submarine Squadron Eight recognized her exceptional performance by presenting her with both the Tactical "T" and Anti-submarine Warfare "A" Award for 1994.

In March 1995, Phoenix returned from her Northern Atlantic Ocean deployment and conducted a SRA from July to October. From late October through mid November, Phoenix was at sea for ORSE workup and the ORSE. She received the Submarine Squadron Eight Deck Seamanship "D" for 1995.

After several at sea periods through June 1996, Phoenix conducted a TRE, an ORSE, and a Logistics Readiness Examination. The next POM workup began in July when the crew's attention turned to fine tuning tactical skills in preparation for an upcoming Northern Atlantic Ocean deployment. Phoenix also received the Squadron Eight Damage Control "DC" Award for the year.

Phoenix conducted her final major deployment when she sailed to the North Atlantic Ocean in January and returned in April 1997. Following stand down and upkeep, Phoenix spent the summer at sea for Midshipman training, sonar testing, various V.I.P. cruises, and an unscheduled ORSE. Phoenix was inactivated on 18 September 1997 at Norfolk Naval Base, before departing Norfolk in late September 1997 en route for Portsmouth Naval Shipyard in Maine for decommissioning.

Phoenix was decommissioned on 29 July 1998 and stricken from the Naval Vessel Register on 29 July 1998. Ex-Phoenix entered the Nuclear Powered Ship and Submarine Recycling Program in Bremerton, Washington, and was scheduled to begin disassembly on 1 March 2007.

As of 2016, the sail, diving planes, and rudder of USS Phoenix arrived in Phoenix, AZ by truck transport from the Puget Sound Naval Shipyard, Bremerton, Washington on Friday, Aug.12. The parts, weighing in at a total of 123,160 pounds, are being stored at the Papago Park Military Reservation until enough money has been raised to restore the parts, create a monument and place them at Steele Indian School Park near the Arizona State Veteran's Home in Phoenix.
