= USS Oklahoma City (SSN-723) =

Los Angeles-class nuclear-powered attack submarine of the US Navy

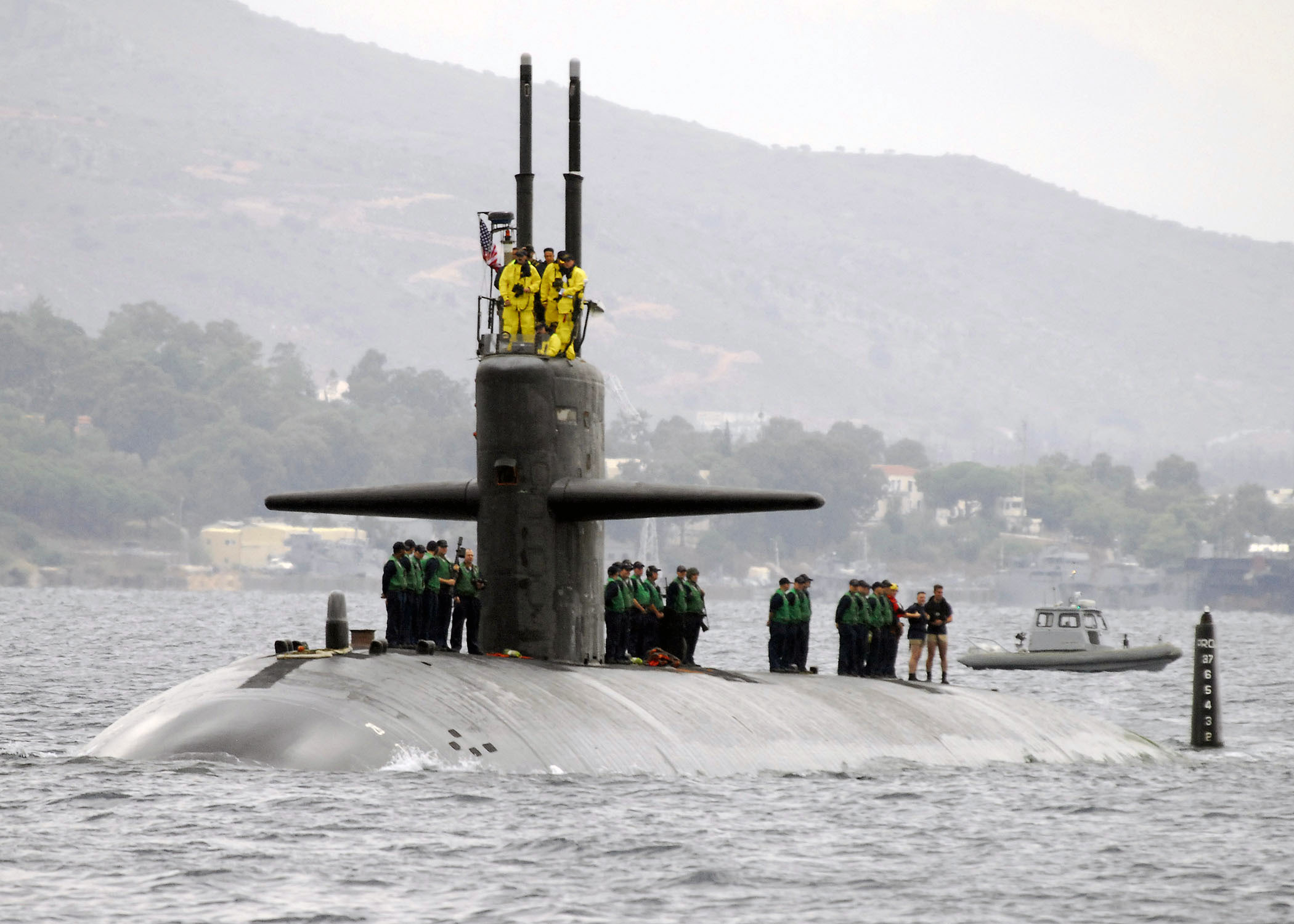
- USS Oklahoma City (SSN-723)

History

United States
- Name: USS Oklahoma City
- Namesake: Oklahoma City, Oklahoma
- Awarded: 13 August 1981
- Builder: Newport News Shipbuilding, Newport News, Virginia
- Laid down: 4 January 1984
- Launched: 2 November 1985
- Sponsored by: Linda M. Nickles
- Acquired: 28 June 1988
- Commissioned: 9 July 1988
- Decommissioned: 9 September 2022
- Out of service: 10 February 2022
- Stricken: 9 September 2022
- Motto: The Sooner, The Better
- Status: Stricken, Final Disposition Pending
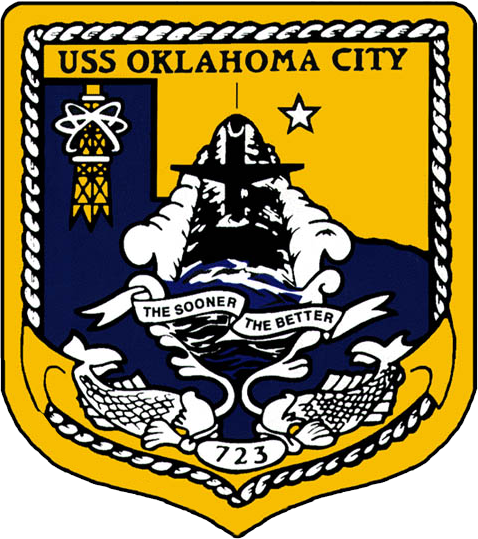
- Badge

General characteristics
- Class & type: Los Angeles-class submarine
- Displacement: 5,782 long tons (5,875 t) light; 6,200 long tons (6,299 t) full; 418 long tons (425 t) dead
- Length: 110.3 m (361 ft 11 in)
- Beam: 10 m (32 ft 10 in)
- Draft: 9.4 m (30 ft 10 in)
- Propulsion: 1 × S6G PWR nuclear reactor with D2W core (165 MW), HEU 93.5%; 2 × steam turbines (33,500) shp; 1 × shaft; 1 × secondary propulsion motor 325 hp (242 kW)
- Speed: Surfaced:20 knots (23 mph; 37 km/h); Submerged: +20 knots (23 mph; 37 km/h) (official)
- Complement: 17 officers, 134 men
- Sensors & processing systems: BQQ-5 passive sonar, BQS-15 detecting and ranging sonar, WLR-8 fire control radar receiver, WLR-9 acoustic receiver for detection of active search sonar and acoustic homing torpedoes, BRD-7 radio direction finder
- Armament: 4 × 21 in (533 mm) bow tubes, 10 Mk48 ADCAP torpedo reloads, Tomahawk land attack missile block 3 SLCM range 1,700 nautical miles (3,100 km), Harpoon anti–surface ship missile range 70 nautical miles (130 km), mine laying Mk67 mobile Mk60 captor mines

USS Oklahoma City (SSN-723), a Los Angeles-class submarine, is the second ship of the United States Navy to be named for Oklahoma City, Oklahoma. The contract to build her was awarded to Newport News Shipbuilding and Dry Dock Company in Newport News, Virginia on 13 August 1981 and the keel was laid down on 4 January 1984. She was launched on 2 November 1985 sponsored by Mrs. Linda M. Nickles, and commissioned on 9 July 1988. In 1991, Oklahoma City won the Marjorie Sterrett Battleship Fund Award for the Atlantic Fleet.

On 13 November 2002, Oklahoma City collided with the Leif Hoegh liquefied natural gas tanker Norman Lady, east of the Strait of Gibraltar. No one on either vessel was hurt, and there were no leaks of oil from fuel tanks and no threat to the environment, but the submarine sustained damage to the periscope and sail area, and put into La Maddalena, Sardinia, for repairs. The submarine's commanding officer was relieved of command on 30 November. One other officer and two enlisted crew members also were disciplined for dereliction of duty.

On 20 January 2005 Oklahoma City returned to Norfolk, Virginia, after a six-month deployment in support of national security interests and the war on terrorism. Oklahoma City transited to a patrol area in the Pacific Ocean via the Arctic Ocean, the first such transit for a second-flight Los Angeles-class submarine. After the patrol, she then completed a circumnavigation of North America by transiting back to the Atlantic Ocean through the Panama Canal and returning to her home port in Norfolk.

In early 2007, Oklahoma City became the first submarine certified to exclusively use Digital Nautical Charts (DNCs), using the Voyage Management System (VMS). VMS is part of the Electronic Chart Display and Information System-Navy (ECDIS-N) system, which has been under development since 1990. The shift from traditional paper navigation to an all-electronic navigation suite marked the first significant shift in U.S. Navy navigation practices since the introduction of the Global Positioning System (GPS) in the 1990s.

From May to November 2007, Oklahoma City completed a deployment to the Persian Gulf in support of the war on terror. The submarine spent May to July 2008 in the Eastern Pacific in support of the war on drugs, and was responsible for seizing more than 11 metric tons of cocaine valued at more than $1.5 billion (USD).

Oklahoma City was awarded the 2008 Squadron Eight Battle "E". After a 26-month overhaul, in March 2011 the sub was forward deployed to Guam.

Oklahoma City arrived at Puget Sound Naval Shipyard, on 22 November 2021 to start her months-long inactivation and decommissioning process. The submarine was officially placed in reserve status, inactivated but in commission on 10 February 2022 and decommissioned on 9 September 2022.
