= USS Birmingham (SSN-695) =

Los Angeles-class nuclear-powered attack submarine of the US Navy

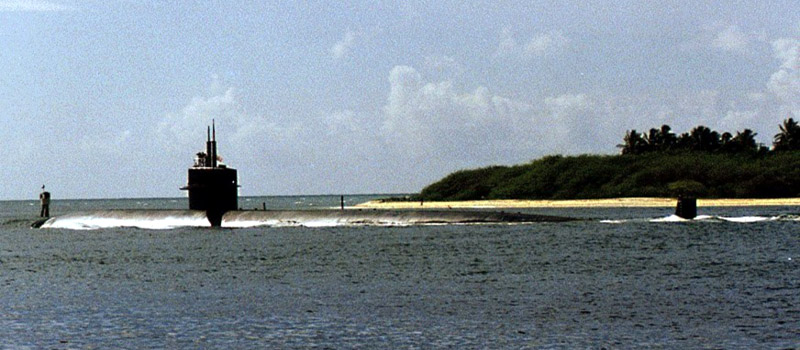
- Birmingham underway

History

United States
- Name: USS Birmingham
- Awarded: 24 January 1972
- Builder: Newport News Shipbuilding
- Laid down: 26 April 1975
- Launched: 29 October 1977
- Commissioned: 16 December 1978
- Decommissioned: 22 December 1997
- Stricken: 22 December 1997
- Motto: Simpliciter Optimus (translated from the unofficial English language "Simply the Best" by former-MM1(SS) Rick Penza)
- Fate: Disposed of by submarine recycling
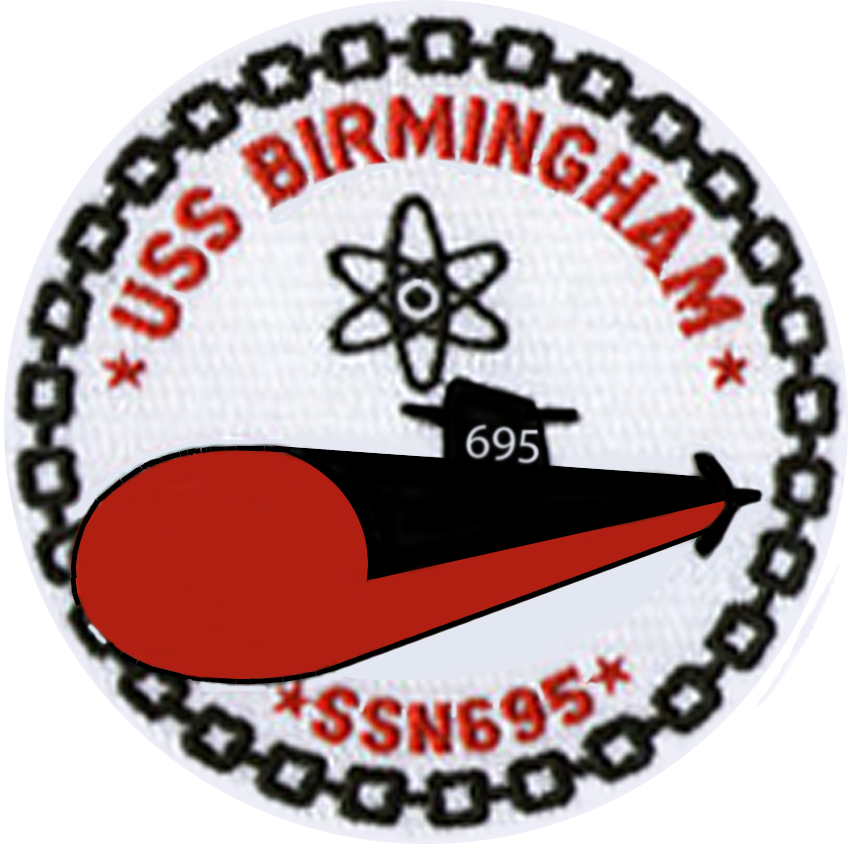
- Badge

General characteristics
- Class & type: Los Angeles-class submarine
- Displacement: 5,789 tons light; 6,159 tons full; 370 tons dead
- Length: 110.3 m (361 ft 11 in)
- Beam: 10 m (32 ft 10 in)
- Draft: 9.7 m (31 ft 10 in)
- Propulsion: S6G nuclear reactor, 2 turbines, 35,000 hp (26 MW), 1 auxiliary motor 325 hp (242 kW), 1 shaft
- Speed: 15 knots (28 km/h) surfaced; 32 knots (59 km/h) submerged
- Test depth: Greater than 400 ft (120 m)
- Complement: 12 officers; 98 enlisted
- Armament: 4 × 21 in (533 mm) bow torpedo tubes; Mk 48-AdCap torpedoes; SubRoc anti-submarine rockets; Tomahawk cruise missiles

USS Birmingham (SSN-695), a Los Angeles-class submarine, was the third ship of the United States Navy to be named for Birmingham, Alabama. The contract to build her was awarded to Newport News Shipbuilding and Dry Dock Company in Newport News, Virginia on 24 January 1972 and her keel was laid down on 26 April 1975. She was launched on 29 October 1977 sponsored by Mrs. Maryon Pittman Allen, wife of Senator James Allen, and commissioned on 16 December 1978.

Birmingham was decommissioned and stricken from the Naval Vessel Register on 22 December 1997. Ex-Birmingham was scheduled to enter the Nuclear Powered Ship and Submarine Recycling Program in Bremerton, Washington on 1 October 2012. In September 2015, Birmingham's sail was placed on static display at Defense Supply Center, Columbus.
