= USS Atlanta (SSN-712) =

Los Angeles-class nuclear-powered attack submarine of the US Navy

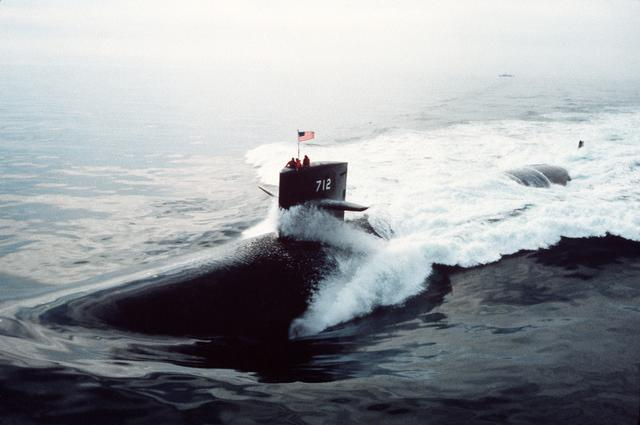
- USS Atlanta underway

History

United States
- Name: USS Atlanta
- Namesake: Atlanta, Georgia
- Awarded: 1 August 1975
- Builder: Newport News Shipbuilding
- Laid down: 17 August 1978
- Launched: 16 August 1980
- Commissioned: 6 March 1982
- Decommissioned: 16 December 1999
- Stricken: 16 December 1999
- Motto: Resurgens; (Latin: "Rise Again")
- Fate: Under recycling
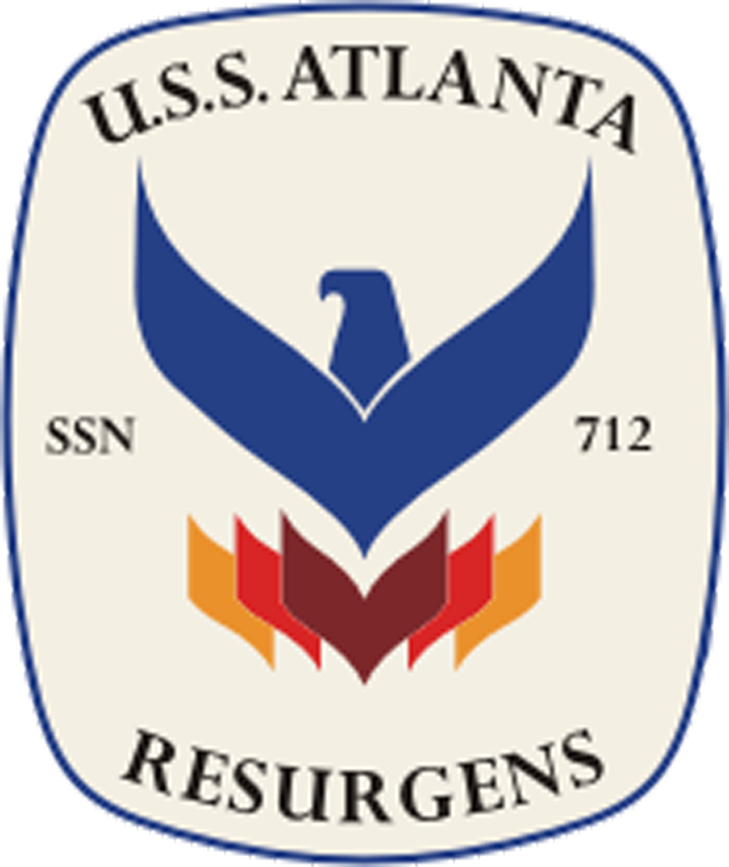
- Badge

General characteristics
- Class & type: Los Angeles-class submarine
- Displacement: 5,732 tons light, 6,160 tons full, 428 tons dead
- Length: 110.3 m (361 ft 11 in)
- Beam: 10 m (32 ft 10 in)
- Draft: 9.7 m (31 ft 10 in)
- Propulsion: S6G nuclear reactor
- Speed: Surfaced:20 knots (23 mph; 37 km/h); Submerged: +20 knots (23 mph; 37 km/h) (official)
- Complement: 12 officers, 115 ratings
- Sensors & processing systems: BQQ-5 passive sonar, BQS-15 detecting and ranging sonar, WLR-8V(2) ESM receiver, WLR-9 acoustic receiver for detection of active search sonar and acoustic homing torpedoes, BRD-7 radio direction finder, BPS-15 radar
- Armament: 4 × 21 in (533 mm) torpedo tubes; Mark 48 torpedo; Harpoon missiles; Tomahawk cruise missile

USS Atlanta (SSN-712), a Los Angeles-class submarine, was the fifth ship of the United States Navy to be named for Atlanta, Georgia. The contract to build her was awarded to Newport News Shipbuilding and Dry Dock Company in Newport News, Virginia, on 1 August 1975 and her keel was laid down on 17 August 1978. She was launched on 16 August 1980 sponsored by Mr. Sam Nunn, and commissioned on 6 March 1982, with Commander Robin J. White in command.

On 29 April 1986 Atlanta ran aground in the Strait of Gibraltar, damaging her sonar gear and puncturing a ballast tank in the bow section. The boat proceeded to Gibraltar under her own power. After a week, the Atlanta returned to Norfolk, VA under its own power, and was repaired in the Norfolk Naval Shipyard in Portsmouth, Virginia.

During Atlanta's brief career, she completed six deployments to the Mediterranean Sea and three deployments to the western Atlantic. She was the first submarine certified to employ the Mark 48 torpedo and both Harpoon missiles and Tomahawk missiles. She was also the first nuclear-powered submarine assigned to directly support an Amphibious Ready Group (ARG).

Atlanta was decommissioned and stricken from the Naval Vessel Register on 16 December 1999. She was berthed at the Norfolk Naval Shipyard in Portsmouth, Virginia, awaiting entry into the Nuclear Powered Ship and Submarine Recycling Program in Bremerton, Washington. Since 2013, she has been recycled.
