= USS Montpelier (SSN-765) =

Los Angeles-class nuclear-powered attack submarine of the US Navy

- USS Montpelier (SSN-765)

History

United States
- Name: USS Montpelier
- Namesake: The City of Montpelier, Vermont
- Awarded: 6 February 1987
- Builder: Newport News Shipbuilding and Drydock Company
- Laid down: 19 May 1989
- Launched: 23 August 1991
- Commissioned: 13 March 1993
- Home port: Naval Station Norfolk (Currently Norfolk Naval Shipyard for overhaul)
- Motto: Audaces Fortuna Juvat; ("Fortune Favors the Bold")
- Nickname(s): "Mighty Monty"
- Status: In active service
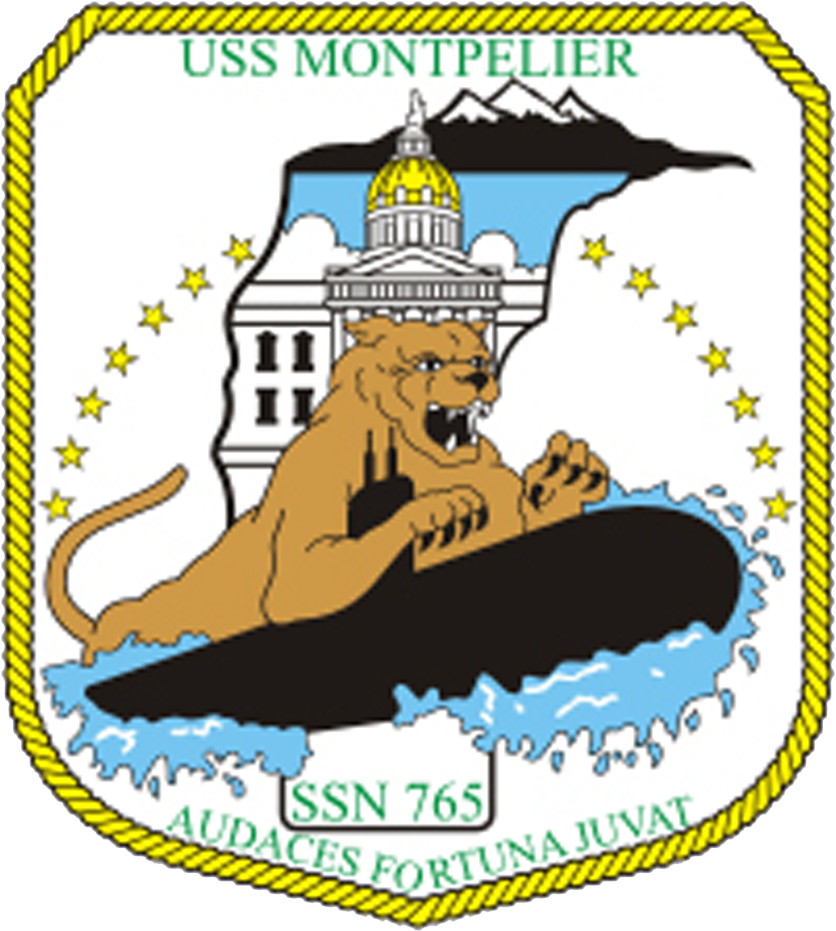
- Badge

General characteristics
- Class & type: Los Angeles-class submarine
- Displacement: 6,000 long tons (6,096 t) light; 6,927 long tons (7,038 t) full; 927 long tons (942 t) dead
- Length: 110.3 m (361 ft 11 in)
- Beam: 10 m (32 ft 10 in)
- Draft: 9.4 m (30 ft 10 in)
- Propulsion: 1 × S6G PWR nuclear reactor with D2W core (165 MW), HEU 93.5%; 2 × steam turbines (33,500) shp; 1 × shaft; 1 × secondary propulsion motor 325 hp (242 kW)
- Complement: 12 officers, 98 men
- Armament: 4 × 21 in (533 mm) torpedo tubes 12 × vertical launch Tomahawk missiles

USS Montpelier (SSN-765), a Los Angeles-class submarine, is the third ship of the United States Navy to be named for Montpelier, Vermont. The contract to build her was awarded to Newport News Shipbuilding and Dry Dock Company in Newport News, Virginia on 6 February 1987 and her keel was laid down on 19 May 1989. She was christened 6 April 1991, launched on 23 August 1991 sponsored by Mrs. Nancy Hayes Sununu, and commissioned on 13 March 1993 with Commander Victor Fiebig in command.

== Service history ==
USS Montpelier was the first submarine to launch Tomahawk cruise missiles in Operation Iraqi Freedom. She would go on to fire all 20 missiles earning her a "clean sweep" under the command of CDR William J. Frake.

On 27 May 2004 Montpelier went through an 18-month Depot Modernization Period (DMP) at Portsmouth Naval Shipyard in Kittery, Maine. The ship and crew completed this period three months ahead of schedule and, after successfully completing sea trials returned to their home port in Virginia. The boat entered Norfolk Naval Shipyard on 5 February 2010 for modernization, maintenance, and upgrades, expected to cost around $35 million for 640,000-man hours, and included changing the submarine's buoyancy characteristics and upgrading its sonar capabilities. The work was completed and the sub returned to the fleet on 26 July 2010, eight days earlier than scheduled.

=== Accident ===
On 13 October 2012, USS Montpelier collided with the cruiser USS San Jacinto off the east coast of the United States near Florida. Both ships were conducting a training exercise at the time of the incident. No one on board either ship was injured. The sub's captain, Commander Thomas Winter, was relieved and by June 2014 the sub had undergone approximately $70 million in repairs for the accident.

== Awards ==
Armed Forces Expeditionary Medals
23–31 March 1997

1 April – 24 June 1997
Armed Forces Service Medals
4–28 April 1995

13 March – 3 June 1995
NATO Medal
March – June 1995
Navy Unit Commendation
March – June 1995

January–July 2003

Navy Expeditionary Medal
July – December 1998
Arctic Service Ribbon
July – December 1998
