= USS Omaha (SSN-692) =

Los Angeles-class nuclear-powered attack submarine of the US Navy

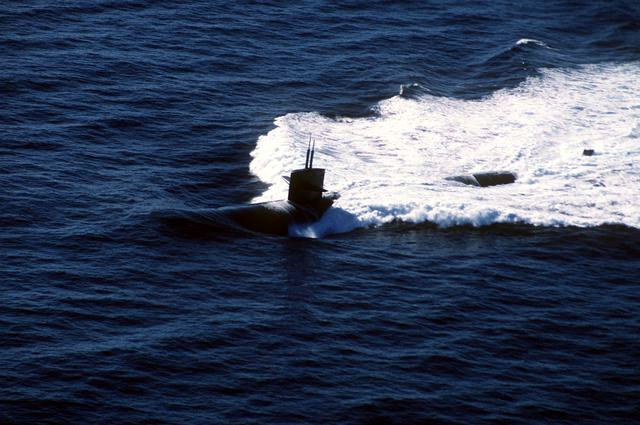
- Omaha underway

History

United States
- Name: USS Omaha
- Namesake: Omaha, Nebraska
- Awarded: 31 January 1971
- Builder: General Dynamics Corporation
- Laid down: 27 January 1973
- Launched: 21 February 1976
- Commissioned: 11 March 1978
- Decommissioned: 5 October 1995
- Stricken: 5 October 1995
- Fate: Disposed of by submarine recycling
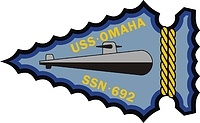
- Badge

General characteristics
- Class & type: Los Angeles-class submarine
- Displacement: 5,700 tons light; 6,071 tons full; 371 tons dead
- Length: 110.3 m (361 ft 11 in)
- Beam: 10 m (32 ft 10 in)
- Draft: 9.7 m (31 ft 10 in)
- Propulsion: S6G nuclear reactor, 2 turbines, 35,000 hp (26,000 kW), 1 auxiliary motor 325 hp (242 kW), 1 shaft
- Speed: 15 knots (28 km/h) surfaced; 32 knots (59 km/h) submerged
- Test depth: 290 m (950 ft)
- Complement: 12 officers; 98 enlisted
- Armament: 4 × 21 in (533 mm) bow torpedo tubes

USS Omaha (SSN-692), a Los Angeles-class submarine, was the third ship of the United States Navy to be named for Omaha, Nebraska. The contract to build her was awarded to the Electric Boat Division of General Dynamics Corporation in Groton, Connecticut, on 31 January 1971 and her keel was laid down on 27 January 1973. She was launched on 21 February 1976 sponsored by Mrs. Victoria Kuncl Hruska, wife of Senator Roman L. Hruska, and commissioned on 11 March 1978.

Omaha was placed in commission in reserve on 7 February 1995, decommissioned and stricken from the Naval Vessel Register on 5 October 1995 and laid up at Bremerton in Washington. She was scheduled to enter the Nuclear Powered Ship and Submarine Recycling Program on 30 September 2010. Recycling was completed 30 November 2012.

== Service history ==
The third Omaha (SSN-692) was laid down on 27 January 1973 at Groton, Connecticut, by the Electric Boat Subsidiary of General Dynamics; launched on 21 February 1976; sponsored by Mrs. Victoria E. Kuncl Hruska, wife of Senator Roman L. Hruska of Nebraska; and commissioned on 11 March 1978.

Upon her commissioning, Omaha was assigned to Groton as her homeport; however, in late April 1978, she was reassigned to Pearl Harbor, Hawaii, effective as of 1 May. The boat sailed from Naval Submarine Base New London on 11 August, arriving on 15 September at Naval Submarine Base Pearl Harbor, where she was a member of Submarine Squadron (SubRon) Seven. Among her accomplishments for the year, the submarine completed sea trials, initial shakedown, Naval Sea Systems Command (NavSea) acoustic trials, Mk. 48 torpedo certification, and a submarine versus submarine type warfare exercise. On 15 November, Omaha entered Pearl Harbor Naval Shipyard for an extended post shakedown availability (PSA) and selected restricted availability (SRA), which concluded in June 1979.

Following post-SRA sea trials, in July 1979 Omaha completed three SubRoc quality assurance system test firings and 12 Mk. 48 torpedo firings for weapons systems accuracy test certification. On 22 July, Omaha stood out from Pearl Harbor for deployment to the Eastern Pacific (EastPac). Ports visited included Seattle, Washington, during the city's Seafair festival and Esquimalt, British Columbia, Canada. During the year, the submarine also completed NavSea acoustic trials, two major anti-submarine warfare (ASW) exercises, two special operations, and several local operations.

In early 1980, Omaha was busy preparing to make her first overseas deployment, conducting training, examinations, certifications, and upkeep in the first half of the year. She set off for the western Pacific (WestPac) in May, arriving on station on 6 June. She completed special operations for Commander Submarine Force, U.S. Pacific Fleet (ComSubPac) through the first week of July and then put in to Subic Bay, Republic of the Philippines, for a week of upkeep. The ship called at Hong Kong in mid-July but had to cut her visit short and put to sea to avoid Typhoon Joe. She paused at Guam on 28 July for three weeks of upkeep. On 16 August, Omaha conducted a surveillance operation in the Philippine Sea and then proceeded to the Indian Ocean, where she operated for the next two months. The boat arrived at the remote outpost of Diego Garcia for a week of upkeep on 28 October and then enjoyed a week-long port visit (10–16 November) at Perth, Australia, before returning to Pearl Harbor in December in time for the holiday season. The boat won the Navy Expeditionary Medal for her service in the Indian Ocean from 23 August–21 November during this deployment. Omaha also this year received a Meritorious Unit Commendation from the Secretary of the Navy.

Omaha departed for another relatively short WestPac deployment early in June 1981, inchopping to the Seventh Fleet on the 8th. The ship conducted special operations for ComSubPac, then put in to Subic Bay for upkeep (28 July–1 August). She then made the return transit to Pearl Harbor. Following her deployment, in September Omaha welcomed 100 guests for a dependents' cruise. She completed a weapons offload and on 25 September the submarine entered dry dock at Pearl Harbor Naval Shipyard. During this SRA period, workers installed a retractable towed array sonar system.

Following sea trials and the completion of SRA in February 1982, Omaha once again prepared to deploy with a series of inspections, examinations, and certifications. The submarine sailed from Pearl Harbor in September for a WestPac deployment, inchopping to the Seventh Fleet with the Enterprise (CVAN-65) Battle Group. During the first week of October, the boat conducted operations in the northern Pacific and Sea of Japan under Commander Task Group (CTG) 70.6. Following upkeep at Subic Bay (13–21 October), Omaha visited Singapore (25–29 October). She then transited the Malacca Strait in company with the escort ship Hepburn (DE-1055) en route to the Indian Ocean for operations with CTG 70.6, including ASWEx 83-2U from 15–17 November. The boat visited Mombasa, Kenya (23–26 November), and Diego Garcia (21–23 December) and rang in the new year at Perth, Australia (30 December–5 January 1983).

Omaha then returned to the Western Pacific, stopping briefly at Subic Bay on the way to ASUWEx 83-1 in the Philippine Sea on 17–18 January 1983. After a maintenance period at Guam from 22 January–8 February, the submarine called at Yokosuka, Japan (15–18 February), and then resumed special operations for ComSubPac until shipping out on 11 March and setting course for Pearl Harbor.

After her post-deployment stand down, Omaha resumed underway operations in May 1983, completing a special project for the Chief of Naval Operations (CNO) off San Clemente Island, California. In June, the boat completed several major inspections and then entered the floating dry dock Competent (AFDM-6) to begin a two-month selected restricted availability. She conducted sea trials and completed SRA in October.

In early January 1984, Omaha exercised with the frigate Badger (FF-1071). She completed a tactical readiness evaluation in March and shortly thereafter put to sea for another WestPac deployment. Arriving on station on 1 April, she completed special operations for ComSubPac until 15 May. From 16–21 May, the ship put in to Yokosuka for upkeep and following a week of operations arrived at Subic Bay for additional maintenance from 30 May–10 June. During the next week, Omaha completed an independent ship exercise in the South China Sea, returning to Subic Bay on 21 June. The submarine made a port visit at Hong Kong supported by the destroyer Leftwich (DD-984) (1–4 August) and then returned to Subic Bay (7–11 August). The boat provided services for CTG 70.6 while en route to Singapore, where Omaha hosted the Honorable Devan Nair, the President of the Republic, for dinner on board one evening during her five day visit (18–22 August). During another upkeep period at Subic Bay (28 August–8 September), the ship had to sortie from 1–3 September to avoid Typhoon Ike. She returned to Pearl Harbor later that month.

Following her deployment, Omaha stood out once again in mid-November 1984 to take part in Fleet Exercise 1-85 in the Philippine Sea from 17 November–1 December. Fellow SubRon Seven boats Swordfish (SSN-579), Sargo (SSN-583), San Francisco (SSN-711), and Bremerton (SSN-698) also participated in this major exercise.

Omaha then made preparations to enter Pearl Harbor Naval Shipyard on 7 January 1985 for a scheduled major overhaul, which continued through all of 1985 and 1986. Significant work completed included upgrading her sonar and fire control systems and reworking all other ship's systems.

Omaha emerged from overhaul on 13 April 1987 and began a series of post-overhaul inspections and certifications to achieve operational readiness for extended deployment. From late July to early September, the submarine completed a six-week EastPac deployment which included acoustic trials and ASW operations. During this cruise, the boat visited Seattle, Washington, and Alameda and San Diego in California. In November, Omaha successfully certified to employ the Tomahawk missile weapons system and in December, she completed her pre-overseas movement certification.

In January 1988, Omaha commenced an eight week deployment to the Northern Pacific (NorPac) area. Following an upkeep period, the ship embarked upon a six month WestPac deployment in April, inchopping on the 21st. Operating in the Philippine Sea, the ship participated in KiloEx from 12–14 May, followed by ASWEx 88-2JA from 18–20 May. She then completed a Harpoon exercise in the South China Sea (27–28 May). Omaha visited Hong Kong from 21–27 August, then returned to sea for various independent and joint evolutions. This deployment also included stops at Okinawa and Yokosuka, Japan; Subic Bay; Guam; and Chinhae, Republic of Korea. Omaha returned home in October, operated locally in November, and successfully completed the tactical readiness examination in December.

In early 1989, Omaha operated locally and completed ship's maintenance. In March she departed Pearl Harbor for an eight week NorPac deployment. After returning home in April, the ship continued local operations and completed a technical proficiency inspection. After making a dependents' cruise with a port call at Lahaina on the island of Maui in June, Omaha completed a selected restricted availability in July and August. She took part in PacEX 89 in September and October. After visiting Cold Bay, Alaska, Omaha returned to Hawaii to conduct local operations and complete her tactical readiness evaluation and pre-overseas movement upkeep in the last quarter of the year.

January 1990 saw Omaha put to sea for another western Pacific deployment. Over the course of her cruise, the submarine called at Yokosuka, Guam, Chinhae, Subic Bay, and Hong Kong. Returning to Pearl Harbor in July, the boat operated locally through the rest of the summer and then departed again for a seven-week NorPac deployment in October, calling at Seattle before returning home in November to resume local operations into the New Year.

Omaha held an intermediate maintenance availability in January 1991. In this month, the ship also achieved a "Solid Gold" wardroom with the qualification of LT Jean-Paul ("JP") Tennant, becoming the only submarine in SubPac with all officers qualified in submarines. In February, Omaha served as the at-sea training ship for prospective commanding officers. She also made two dependents' cruises with a port call at Lahaina. Following upkeep, the submarine operated locally through the spring while also completing torpedo certification proficiency firings and the tactical readiness evaluation.

In May 1991, Omaha departed for a seven week deployment to the northern Pacific, conducting operations for ComSubPac. On the 31st, the ship participated in a humanitarian evacuation of one of her crew off Kodiak Island due to the premature birth of his child, the crewman being transported ashore by a Coast Guard helicopter. Happily, his child recovered fully from the complications of premature birth. The submarine made a port visit at Adak, Alaska, in June and returned to Pearl Harbor in July. Shortly thereafter, Omaha put to sea once again, headed this time for the eastern Pacific. From 2–6 August, the ship stopped at Esquimalt, British Columbia, then put in to Bangor, Washington (10–11 August), where she embarked male guests for a "Tiger Cruise" to Alameda, California. While at Alameda (14–19 August), Omaha conducted two distinguished visitor cruises on the 14th and 15th. Guests included the mayor of Alameda and the Honorable P. J. Morgan, mayor of Omaha, Neb., and other honored guests of the ship's namesake city. After another brief stop at San Diego (24–25 August), the boat returned home to Pearl Harbor. Omaha received a Meritorious Unit Commendation for her work from 1 January 1990 – 1 August 1991.

Following her EastPac deployment, Omaha operated locally until 4 November 1991, when she entered Competent for selected restricted availability. The ship completed sea trials and concluded her SRA at the end of February 1992 and commenced operations in local waters. In March, the submarine exercised with Pintado (SSN-672) and Birmingham (SSN-695). She held another dependents' cruise in April, including a stop at Lahaina. As Omaha prepared for her next deployment during the spring, she completed her tactical readiness evaluation and deperming. The boat participated in the major multi-national fleet exercise RimPac 92 in June and achieved her pre-overseas movement certification in July.

Omaha departed on a six month WestPac deployment in August 1992. During her transit of the Pacific, the submarine took part in battle group support exercises. Later in the month, she conducted a search and rescue exercise and touched at Sasebo, Japan. In November, the boat called at Yokosuka and then headed to Australia to take part in Exercise Lungfish 92 with the Australian submarines HMAS Otway (S.59) and HMAS Ovens (S.70). The ship visited Melbourne (2–5 December) and Brisbane (14–17 December) and then sailed for Guam for a maintenance availability alongside submarine tender Holland (AS-32). Omaha departed Guam 10 January 1993 and returned to Pearl Harbor, arriving on 26 January.

Following post-deployment stand down, Omaha held an intermediate maintenance activity in March 1993 and conducted underway training locally. An inspection and survey board conducted an underway material inspection 23–24 April. At the end of the month, the ship enjoyed a dependents cruise and port call in Kailua-Kona (30 April–3 May) on the island of Hawaii. She returned to Pearl Harbor and operated locally for the rest of the spring and then spent most of July in upkeep. The submarine completed major assessments in the summer and also conducted prospective commanding officer (PCO) operations in August.

On 13 September 1993, Omaha got underway for an EastPac deployment, headed first to San Diego (18–26 September). Members of the veterans' association for the previous Omaha (CL-4), in town for their annual reunion, met with the crew of the submarine on the 21st, and the ship's historian reported that "New ties [were] made between all shipmates of the Omahas." Additional ports visited during the deployment included Alameda (28–30 September) and Nanoose and Esquimalt, B.C. (6–12 October). She returned to Hawaii on 4 November and spent the rest of the year in stand down and upkeep.

The beginning of 1994 found Omaha preparing for her next WestPac deployment with underway training and assessments, an intermediate maintenance activity in February and completion of pre-overseas movement certification in March. She stood out from Pearl Harbor on 4 April and set course for the western Pacific, calling later that month in Sasebo, Japan. In May, the ship made a short stop at Chinhae, where two Republic of Korea naval personnel embarked for a brief submarine indoctrination cruise. In June, Omaha participated in RimPac 94, a large joint battle exercise with warships from the U.S., Canadian, Australian, Japanese, and South Korean navies. During operations, the submarine conducted a humanitarian evacuation of a senior chief petty officer who was transferred by helicopter to the aircraft carrier Independence (CV-62). June also saw Omaha in Guam for an availability alongside Holland, and the ship also conducted special forces training with a U.S. Marine reconnaissance company off Okinawa. The boat paid another visit to Guam for maintenance alongside Holland in August. She then called at Brisbane (20–25 August) and American Samoa (29 August–1 September). Arriving back at Pearl Harbor on 6 September, for the rest of the month Omaha's crew enjoyed a well-deserved stand-down period with their families after having maintained 81% operation tempo while deployed.

Omaha resumed operations in October 1994, sailing in local waters in support of various ships in Squadron Seven. In November, the submarine held an intermediate maintenance availability. While on deployment earlier in the year, Omaha's crew received word that they would be changing homeports to Kittery, Maine, effective administratively on 1 December, to undergo inactivation at Portsmouth Naval Shipyard. To conclude her time in Pearl Harbor, Omaha conducted a dependents' cruise to Kailua-Kona (12–15 December). The following day at Naval Submarine Base Pearl Harbor, the boat held an inactivation ceremony with three former commanding officers (Hamilton, Sherwood, and Pohtos) in attendance, marking the beginning of the process of stripping the ship prior to decommissioning and final disposition.

Placed in reserve status on 7 February 1995, Omaha was decommissioned at Portsmouth Naval Shipyard on 5 October 1995 and stricken from the Naval Vessel Register the same day. The boat was disposed of in the Ship and Submarine Recycling Program at Puget Sound Naval Shipyard in Bremerton, Washington. Recycling was completed as of 30 November 2012. Omaha's sail and rudder have been preserved for placement in a memorial park in the submarine's namesake city.
