= USS Groton (SSN-694) =

Los Angeles-class nuclear-powered attack submarine of the US Navy

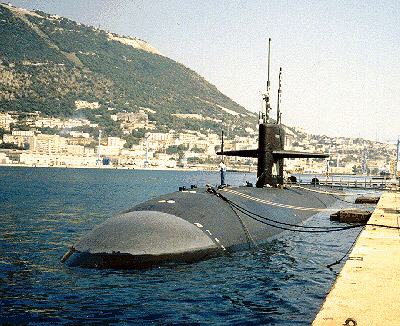
- Groton alongside

History

United States
- Name: USS Groton
- Namesake: Groton, Connecticut
- Awarded: 31 January 1971
- Builder: General Dynamics Corporation
- Laid down: 3 August 1973
- Launched: 9 October 1976
- Commissioned: 8 July 1978
- Decommissioned: 7 November 1997
- Stricken: 7 November 1997
- Fate: Disposed of by submarine recycling
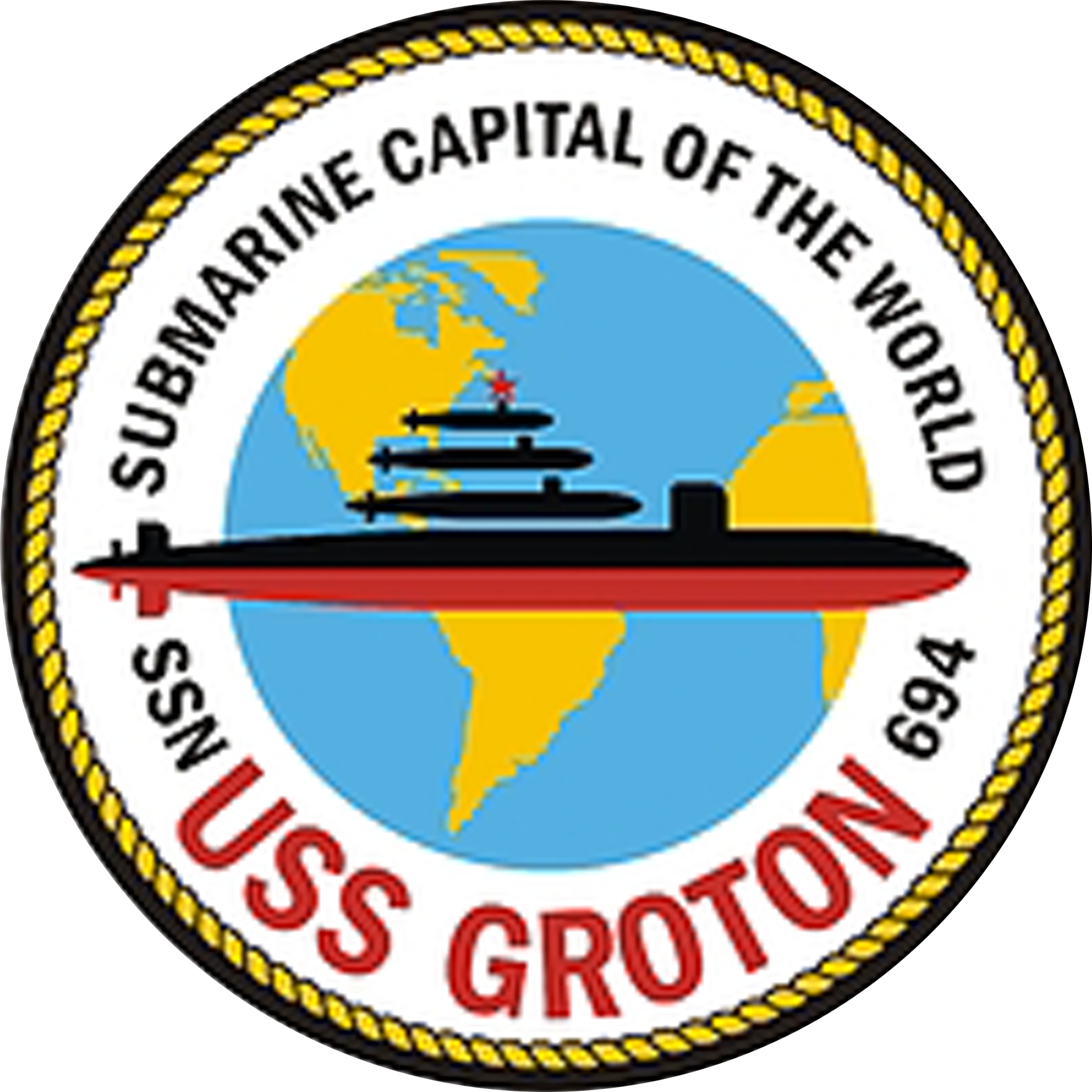
- Badge

General characteristics
- Class & type: Los Angeles-class submarine
- Displacement: 5,780 tons light; 6,143 tons full; 363 tons dead
- Length: 110.3 m (361 ft 11 in)
- Beam: 10 m (32 ft 10 in)
- Draft: 9.4 m (30 ft 10 in)
- Propulsion: S6G nuclear reactor, 2 turbines, 35,000 hp (26,000 kW); 1 auxiliary motor 325 hp (242 kW), 1 shaft
- Speed: 15 knots (28 km/h) surfaced; 32 knots (59 km/h) submerged
- Test depth: 290 m (950 ft)
- Complement: 12 officers; 98 enlisted
- Armament: 4 × 21 in (533 mm) bow torpedo tubes

USS Groton (SSN-694), the seventh Los Angeles-class submarine, was the third ship of the United States Navy to be named for Groton, Connecticut. The contract to build her was awarded to the Electric Boat Division of General Dynamics Corporation in Groton, Connecticut on 31 January 1971 and her keel was laid down on 3 August 1973. She was launched on 9 October 1976 sponsored by Mrs. Anne Francis Richardson (née Hazard), wife of Secretary of Commerce Elliot L. Richardson, and commissioned on 8 July 1978, with Commander R. William Vogel, III in command and Master Chief Petty Officer Joseph Pow as Chief of the Boat.

Groton departed on her first overseas deployment in March 1980 to the Indian Ocean. The submarine made her way back to the homeport of Groton, Connecticut by way of the Panama Canal. Groton completed the Around-the-World Cruise in October 1980.

Groton was decommissioned and stricken from the Naval Vessel Register on 7 November 1997. Ex-Groton was scheduled to enter the Nuclear Powered Ship and Submarine Recycling Program in Bremerton, Washington 1 October 2011.
