= Los Angeles-class submarine =

Class of nuclear-powered fast attack submarines of the United States Navy

- Los Angeles-class SSN profile

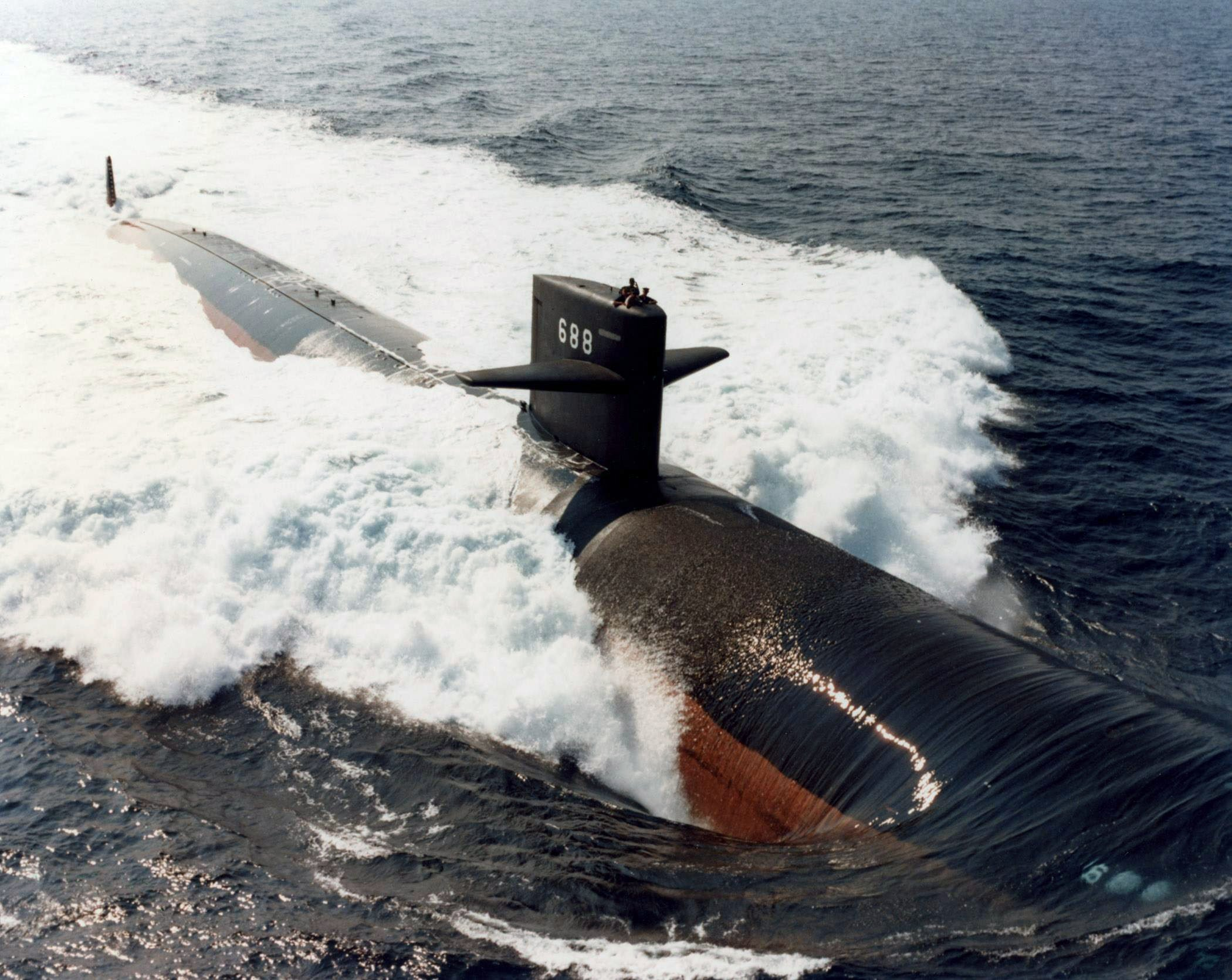
- USS Los Angeles, lead boat of the class.

Class overview
- Builders: Newport News Shipbuilding; General Dynamics Electric Boat
- Operators: United States Navy
- Preceded by: Sturgeon class
- Succeeded by: Seawolf class
- Cost: $900 million, 1990 dollars; $1.9 billion, 2024 dollars
- Built: 1972–1996
- In commission: 1976–present
- Completed: 62
- Active: 18
- Laid up: 5
- Retired: 38
- Preserved: 2 (as moored training ships)

General characteristics
- Type: Nuclear attack submarine
- Displacement: Surfaced: 6,082 t (5,986 long tons); Submerged: 6,927 t (6,818 long tons)
- Length: 362 ft (110 m)
- Beam: 33 ft (10 m)
- Draft: 31 ft (9.4 m)
- Propulsion: 1 × S6G nuclear reactor (150–165 MW); 2 × steam turbines (30,000–33,500) shp; 1 × shaft; 1 × secondary propulsion motor 325 hp (242 kW)
- Speed: Surfaced: 20 knots (37 km/h; 23 mph); Submerged: Over 25 knots (46 km/h; 29 mph), official; 33+ knots, reported
- Range: Refueling required after 30 years
- Endurance: 90 days
- Test depth: 450 m (1,480 ft)
- Complement: 129
- Sensors & processing systems: BQQ-5 suite which includes active and passive systems sonar, BQS-15 detecting and ranging sonar, WLR-8V(2) ESM receiver, WLR-9 acoustic receiver for detection of active search sonar and acoustic homing torpedoes, BRD-7 radio direction finder, BPS-15 radar
- Electronic warfare & decoys: WLR-10 countermeasures set
- Armament: 4 × 21 in (533 mm) torpedo tubes, 37 × Mk 48 torpedo, Tomahawk land attack missile, Harpoon anti-ship missile, Mk 67 mobile, or Mk 60 CAPTOR mines (FLTII and 688i FLTIII have a 12-tube VLS)

The Los Angeles class of submarines are nuclear-powered fast-attack submarines (SSN) in service with the United States Navy. Also known as the 688 class (pronounced "six-eighty-eight") after the hull number of lead vessel USS Los Angeles (SSN-688), 62 were built from 1972 to 1996, the latter 23 to an improved 688i standard. As of 2026, 23 of the Los Angeles class remain in commission with 4 of those inactive in reserve, and they account for almost half of the U.S. Navy's 50 fast-attack submarines.

Submarines of this class are named after American towns and cities, such as Albany, New York; Los Angeles, California; and Tucson, Arizona, with the exception of USS Hyman G. Rickover, named for the "father of the nuclear Navy." This was a change from traditionally naming attack submarines after marine animals, such as USS Seawolf or USS Shark. Rickover explained the decision to name the submarines after cities (and occasionally politicians influential in defense issues) by observing that "fish don't vote."

== Development ==
In the late 1960s, the Soviet Union's advances in submarine technology increasingly threatened the survivability of US Navy (USN) carrier battle groups. Soviet fast-attack submarines became capable of keeping pace with carrier groups, while their newer missile submarines could potentially overwhelm the group's defenses with salvos of missiles. Development of the Los Angeles class commenced in 1967 as a response. The class originally had essentially the same weapons and sensors as the preceding Sturgeon class, but was about 50% larger with "major improvements" in stealth and speed, so they, too, could keep up with carrier battle groups.

On 1 December 1976, General Dynamics Electric Boat (GDEB) submitted a $544 million claim related to its contract for 18 Los-Angeles-class submarines; the contractor alleged the USN made an undue amount of design changes while the government argued that Electric Boat mismanaged its operations. The USN and General Dynamics reached an $843 million settlement agreement in June 1978; the contract price was increased by $125 million, GDEB absorbed a $359 million loss, and the USN paid an additional $359 million under the authority of Public Law 85-804. The USN and General Dynamics had a further dispute in 1979–1980, when nonconforming steel was found to have been used in the construction of the submarines and thousands of welds were found to be either defective or missing. This led General Dynamics to file a $100 million insurance claim to cover the costs of reinspections of the yard's work, "thus, Electric Boat was asking the Navy to reimburse it for its own mismanagement." The parties reached an agreement in 1981 whereby GDEB was awarded a firm contract for an additional 688-class boat and two options; the Navy needed GDEB's shipbuilding capacity to achieve its procurement goals.

Los Angeles-class submarines were built in three successive flights:

Flight	Pennant numbers	Ordered dates	Upgrades (where applicable)
I	SSNs 688–718	1971–1977	N/A
II	SSNs 719–750	1977–1982	12 vertical launch tubes for Tomahawk cruise missiles and an upgraded reactor core
III	SSNs 751–773	1982–1989	"688i" (for Improved): Quieter, advanced BSY-1 sonar suite, the ability to lay mines and configured for under-ice operations

== Design ==
=== Flights ===
Flight II 688 VLS.

Flight III 688I.

In 1982, after building 31 boats, the class underwent a minor redesign. The following eight that made up the second "flight" of subs had 12 new vertical launch tubes that could fire Tomahawk missiles. The last 23 had a significant upgrade with the 688i improvement program. These boats are quieter, with more advanced electronics, sensors, and noise-reduction technology. The diving planes are placed at the bow rather than on the sail, and are retractable. A further four boats were proposed by the Navy, but later cancelled.

=== Capabilities ===
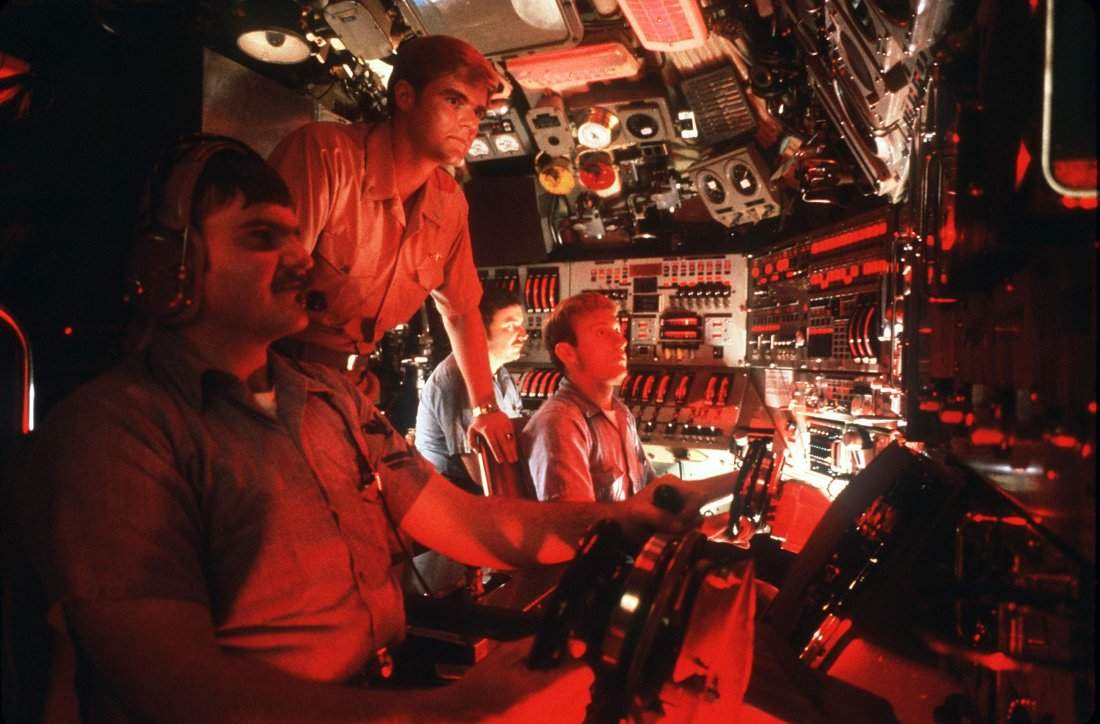
Crewmen monitor consoles at the diving station aboard a Los Angeles-class submarine

According to the U.S. Department of Defense, the top speed of the submarines of the Los Angeles class is over 25 knots (46 km/h; 29 mph), although the actual maximum is classified. Some published estimates have placed their top speed at 30 to 33 knots (56 to 61 km/h; 35 to 38 mph). In his book Submarine: A Guided Tour Inside a Nuclear Warship, Tom Clancy estimated the top speed of Los Angeles-class submarines at about 37 knots (69 km/h; 43 mph).

The U.S. Navy gives the maximum operating depth of the Los Angeles class as 650 ft (200 m), while Patrick Tyler, in his book Running Critical, suggests a maximum operating depth of 950 ft (290 m). Although Tyler cites the 688-class design committee for this figure, the government has not commented on it. The maximum diving depth is 1,475 ft (450 m) according to Jane's Fighting Ships, 2004–2005 Edition, edited by Commodore Stephen Saunders of the Royal Navy.

=== Weapons ===
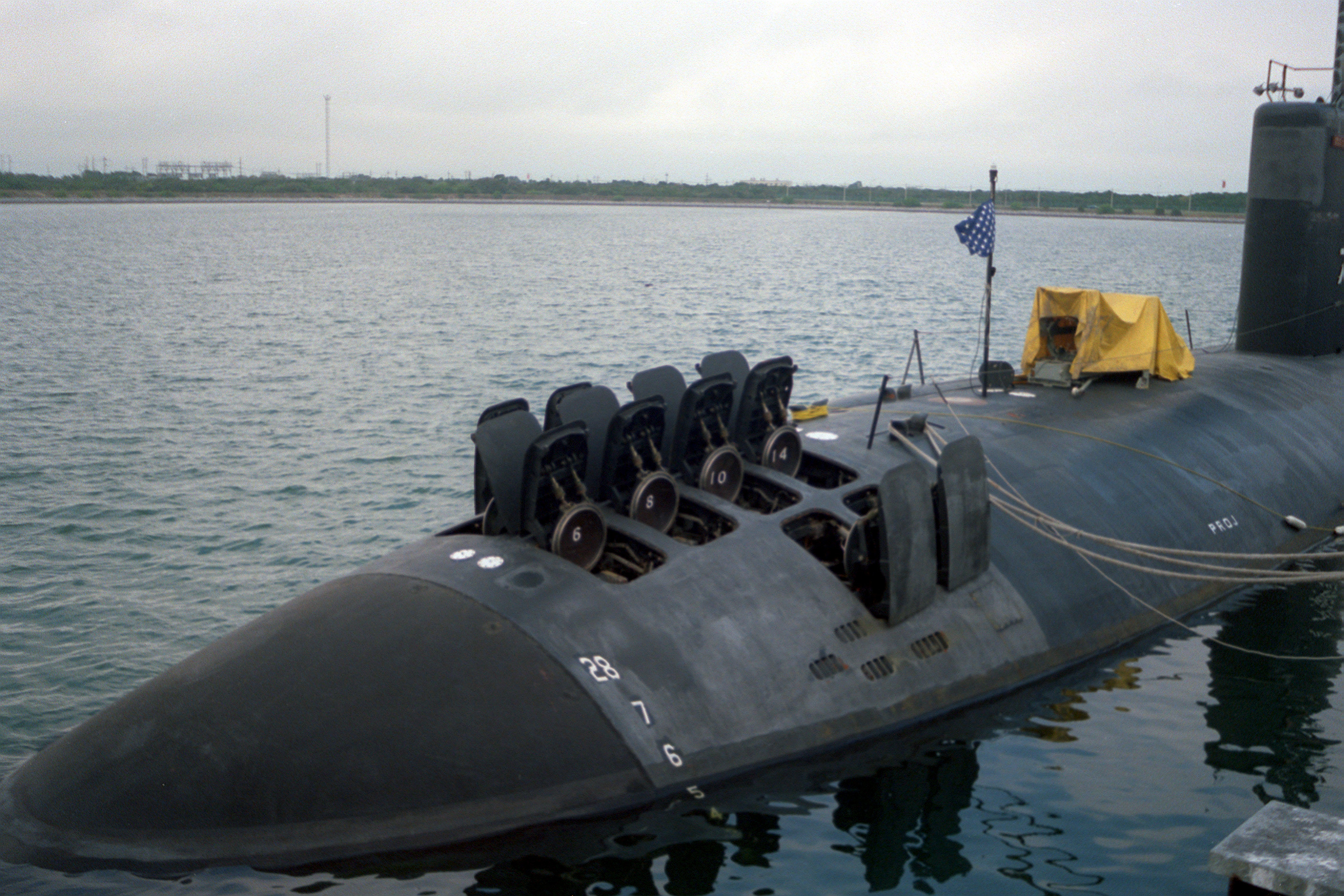
A portside bow view of the fore section of USS Santa Fe tied up at the pier in February 1994: The doors of the Mark 36 vertical launch system for the Tomahawk missiles are in the "open" position.

Los Angeles-class submarines carry 24 torpedo tube-launched weapons, as well as Mark 67 and Mark 60 CAPTOR mines and were designed to launch Tomahawk cruise missiles and Harpoon missiles horizontally (from the torpedo tubes). The last 31 boats of this class (Flight II and Flight III/688i) also have 12 dedicated vertical launching system tubes for launching Tomahawks. The tube configuration for the first two boats of Flight II differed from the later ones: Providence and Pittsburgh have four rows of three tubes vs. the inner two rows of four and outer two rows of two tubes found on other examples. The 688i ("improved") model submarines are capable of deploying the Mk 67 Submarine Launched Mobile Mines.

=== Control systems ===
After nearly 40 years, the control suite of the class has changed dramatically. The class was originally equipped with the Mk 113 mod 10 fire-control system, also known as the Pargo display program. The Mk 113 runs on a UYK-7 computer.

The Mk 117 FCS, the first "all digital" fire-control system, replaced the Mk 113. The Mk 117 transferred the duties of the analog Mk 75 attack director to the UYK-7, and the digital Mk 81 weapon control consoles, removing the two analog conversions, and allowing "all digital" control of the digital Mk 48 control. The first 688 sub to be built with the Mk 117 was USS Dallas.

The Mark 1 Combat Control System/All Digital Attack Center replaced the Mk 117 FCS, on which it was based. The Mk 1 CCS was built by Lockheed Martin, and gave the class the ability to fire Tomahawk missiles. The CSS internal tracker model provides processing for both towed-array and spherical-array trackers. Trackers are signal followers that generate bearing, arrival angle, and frequency reports based on information received by an acoustic sensor. It incorporated the Gyro Static Navigator into the system in replacement of the AN/WSN-1 DMINS (Dual Mini Ship's Inertial navigation system) of the earlier 688 class.

The Mk 1 CCS was replaced by the Mk 2, which was built by Raytheon. Mk 2 provides Tomahawk Block III vertical launch capability as well as fleet-requested improvements to Mk 48 ADCAP torpedo and Towed Array Target Motion Analysis operability. The Mk 2 CCS paired with the AN/BQQ-5E system is referred to as the QE-2" system. The CCS MK2 Block 1 A/B system architecture extends the CCS MK2 tactical system with a network of tactical advanced computers (TAC-3). These TAC-3s are configured to support the SFMPL, NTCS-A, LINK-11 and ATWCS subsystems.

=== Sensors ===
==== Sonar ====
===== AN/BQQ-5 =====
AN/BQQ-5 sensor suite consists of the AN/BQS-13 spherical sonar array and AN/UYK-44 computer. The AN/BQQ-5 was developed from the AN/BQQ-2 sonar system. The BQS 11, 12, and 13 spherical arrays have 1,241 transducers. Also equipped are a conformal hull array with 104 to 156 hydrophones and two towed arrays: the TB-12 (later replaced by the TB-16) and TB-23 or TB-29, of which there are multiple variants. There are five versions of the AN/BQQ-5 system, sequentially identified by letters A–E.

The 688i (Improved) subclass was initially equipped with the AN/BSY-1 SUBACS submarine advanced combat system that used an AN/BQQ-5E sensor system with updated computers and interface equipment. Development of the AN/BSY-1 and its sister the AN/BSY-2 for the Seawolf class was widely reported as one of the most problematic programs for the Navy, its cost and schedule suffering many setbacks.

A series of conformal passive hydrophones are hard-mounted to each side of the hull, using the AN/BQR-24 internal processor. The system uses FLIT (frequency line integration tracking) which homes in on precise narrowband frequencies of sound and, using the Doppler principle, can accurately provide firing solutions against very quiet submarines. The AN/BQQ-5's hull array doubled the performance of its predecessors.

===== AN/BQQ-10 =====
The AN/BQQ-5 system was replaced by the AN/BQQ-10 system. Acoustic Rapid Commercial Off-The-Shelf Insertion (A-RCI), designated AN/BQQ-10, is a four-phase program for transforming existing submarine sonar systems (AN/BSY-1, AN/BQQ-5, and AN/BQQ-6) from legacy systems to a more capable and flexible COTS/Open System Architecture (OSA) and also provide the submarine force with a common sonar system. A single A-RCI Multi-Purpose Processor (MPP) has as much computing power as the entire Los Angeles (SSN-688/688I) submarine fleet combined and will allow the development and use of complex algorithms previously beyond the reach of legacy processors. The use of COTS/OSA technologies and systems will enable rapid periodic updates to both software and hardware. COTS-based processors will allow computer power growth at a rate commensurate with the commercial industry.

=== Engineering and auxiliary systems ===
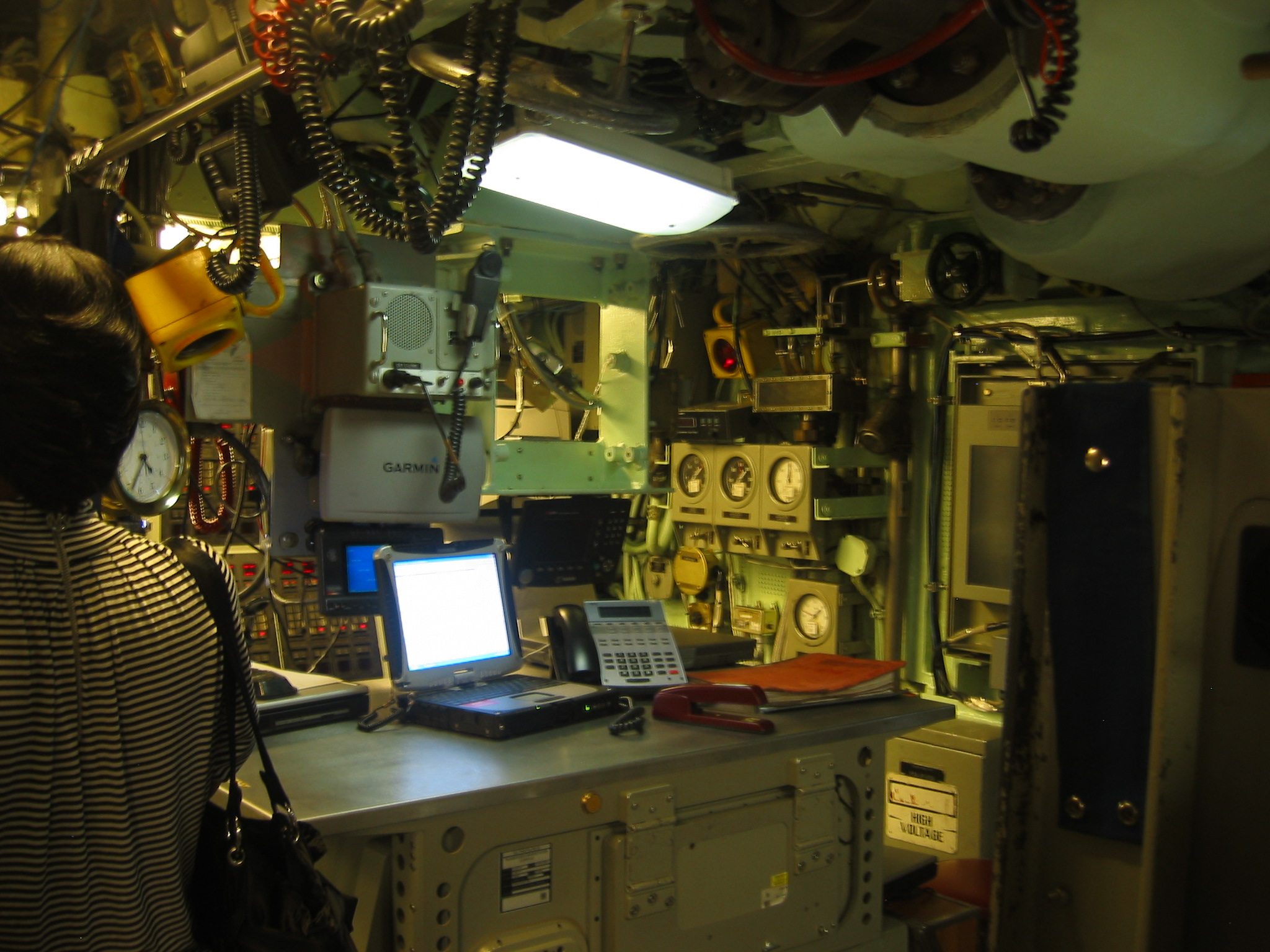
The aft end of the control room for USS Jefferson City in June 2009

Two watertight compartments are used in the Los Angeles-class submarines. The forward compartment contains crew living spaces, weapons-handling spaces, and control spaces not critical to recovering propulsion. The aft compartment contains the bulk of the submarine's engineering systems, power generation turbines, and water-making equipment. Some submarines in the class are capable of delivering Navy SEALs through either a SEAL Delivery Vehicle deployed from the Dry Deck Shelter or the Advanced SEAL Delivery System mounted on the dorsal side, although the latter was cancelled in 2006 and removed from service in 2009. A variety of atmospheric control devices are used to allow the vessel to remain submerged for long periods of time without ventilating, including an electrolytic oxygen generator, which produces oxygen for the crew and hydrogen as a byproduct. The hydrogen is pumped overboard but there is always a risk of fire or explosion from this process.

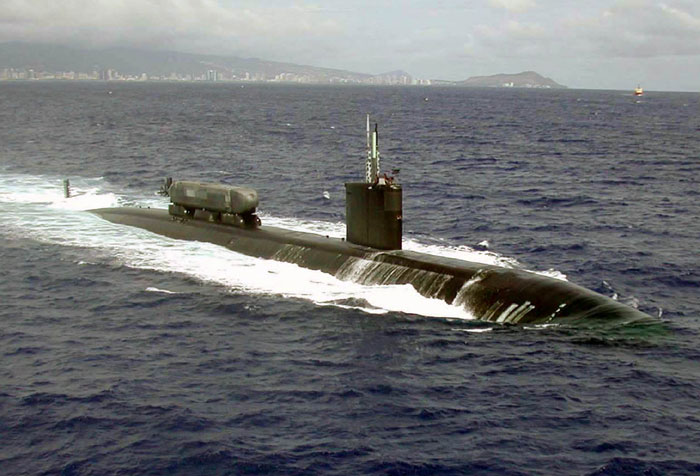
USS Greeneville with an attached ASDS

While on the surface or at snorkel depth, the submarine may use the submarine's auxiliary or emergency diesel generator for power or ventilation (e.g., following a fire). The diesel engine in a 688 class can be quickly started by compressed air during emergencies or to evacuate noxious (nonvolatile) gases from the boat, although 'ventilation' requires raising a snorkel mast. During nonemergency situations, design constraints call for operators to allow the engine to reach normal operating temperatures before it is capable of producing full power, a process that may take from 20 to 30 minutes. However, the diesel generator can be immediately loaded to 100% power output, despite design criteria cautions, at the discretion of the submarine commander on the recommendation of the submarine's engineer, if necessity dictates such actions to: (a) restore electrical power to the submarine, (b) prevent a reactor incident from occurring or escalating, or (c) to protect the lives of the crew or others as determined necessary by the commanding officer.

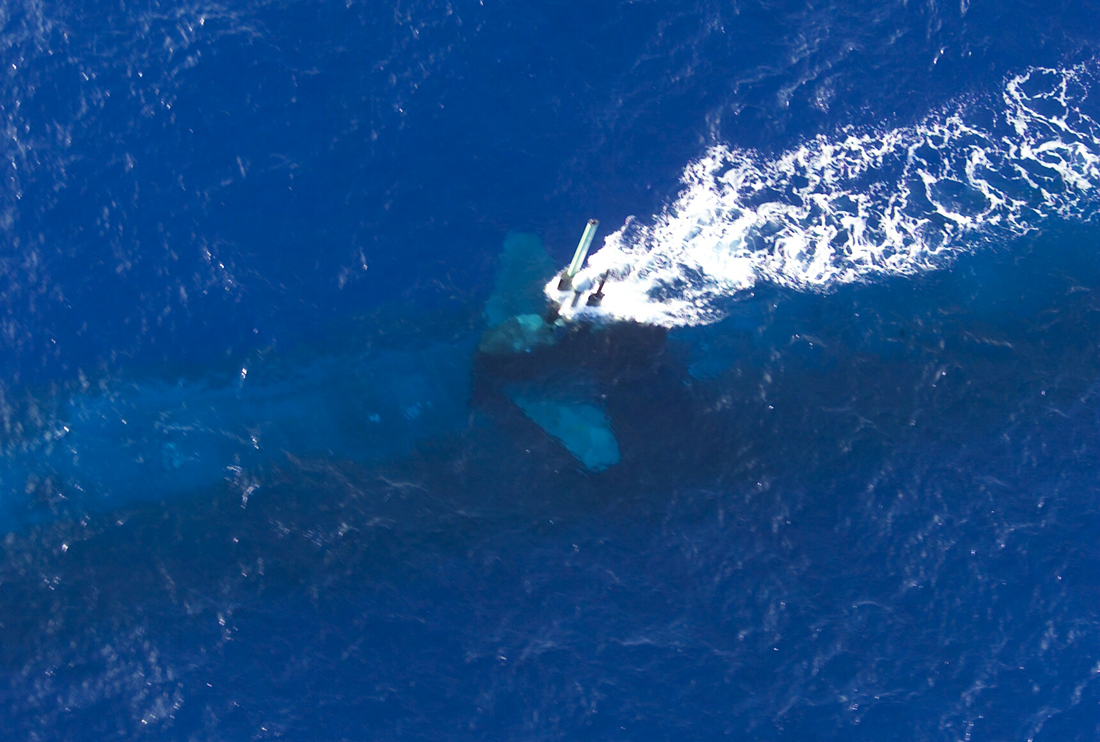
USS Key West submerged at periscope depth off the coast of Honolulu, Hawaii in July 2004

=== Propulsion ===
The Los Angeles class is powered by the General Electric S6G pressurized water reactor. The hot reactor coolant water heats water in the steam generators, producing steam to power the propulsion turbines and ship service turbine generators (SSTGs), which generate the submarine's electrical power. The high-speed propulsion turbines drive the shaft and propeller through a reduction gear. In the case of a reactor plant casualty, the submarine has a diesel generator and a bank of batteries to provide electrical power. An emergency propulsion motor on the shaft line or a retractable 325-hp secondary propulsion motor power the submarine off the battery or diesel generator.

The S6G reactor plant was originally designed to use the D1G-2 core, similar to the D2G reactor used on the guided missile cruiser USS Bainbridge. The D1G-2 core had a rated thermal power of 150 MW and the turbines were rated at 30,000 shp. All Los Angeles-class submarines from USS Providence on were built with a D2W core and older submarines with D1G-2 cores have been refueled with D2W cores. The D2W core is rated at 165 MW and turbine power rose to approximately 33,500 shp.

== Boats in class ==
Summary of Status	Count
Active, in commission	18
Active (Reserve), Awaiting Decommissioning	5
Converted to moored training ship	2
Inactive or decommissioned & stricken	20
Disposed of by submarine recycling	18
Total	62

The class has a total of 62 boats divided into three flights as follows:

- 31 × Flight I
- 8 × Flight II with VLS
- 23 × Flight III 688i (Improved)

=== Submarines ===
Name	Hull number	Flight	Builder	Ordered	Laid down	Launched	Commissioned	Decommissioned	Service life	Status	Homeport/ NVR page
Los Angeles	SSN-688	I	Newport News Shipbuilding, Newport News	8 January 1971	8 January 1972	6 April 1974	13 November 1976	4 February 2011	34 years, 2 months and 22 days	Disposed of by submarine recycling	N/A
Baton Rouge	SSN-689	I	Newport News Shipbuilding, Newport News	8 January 1971	18 November 1972	26 April 1975	25 June 1977	13 January 1995	17 years, 6 months and 19 days	Disposed of by submarine recycling	N/A
Philadelphia	SSN-690	I	General Dynamics Electric Boat, Groton	8 January 1971	12 August 1972	19 October 1974	25 June 1977	25 June 2010	33 years, 0 months and 0 days	Stricken, final disposition pending	N/A
Memphis	SSN-691	I	Newport News Shipbuilding, Newport News	4 February 1971	23 June 1973	3 April 1976	17 December 1977	1 April 2011	33 years, 3 months and 15 days	Stricken, final disposition pending	N/A
Omaha	SSN-692	I	General Dynamics Electric Boat, Groton	31 January 1971	27 January 1973	21 February 1976	11 March 1978	5 October 1995	17 years, 6 months and 24 days	Disposed of by submarine recycling	N/A
Cincinnati	SSN-693	I	Newport News Shipbuilding, Newport News	4 February 1971	6 April 1974	19 February 1977	11 March 1978	29 July 1996	18 years, 4 months and 18 days	Disposed of by submarine recycling	N/A
Groton	SSN-694	I	General Dynamics Electric Boat, Groton	31 January 1971	3 August 1973	9 October 1976	8 July 1978	7 November 1997	19 years, 3 months and 30 days	Disposed of by submarine recycling	N/A
Birmingham	SSN-695	I	Newport News Shipbuilding, Newport News	24 January 1972	26 April 1975	29 October 1977	16 December 1978	22 December 1997	19 years and 6 days (0 months)	Disposed of by submarine recycling	N/A
New York City	SSN-696	I	General Dynamics Electric Boat, Groton	24 January 1972	15 December 1973	18 June 1977	3 March 1979	30 April 1997	18 years, 1 month and 27 days	Stricken, to be disposed of by submarine recycling	N/A
Indianapolis	SSN-697	I	General Dynamics Electric Boat, Groton	24 January 1972	19 October 1974	30 July 1977	5 January 1980	22 December 1998	18 years, 11 months and 17 days	Disposed of by submarine recycling	N/A
Bremerton	SSN-698	I	General Dynamics Electric Boat, Groton	24 January 1972	8 May 1976	22 July 1978	28 March 1981	21 May 2021	40 years, 1 month and 23 days	Stricken, final disposition pending	N/A
Jacksonville	SSN-699	I	General Dynamics Electric Boat, Groton	24 January 1972	21 February 1976	18 November 1978	16 May 1981	16 November 2021	40 years and 6 months	Stricken, final disposition pending	N/A
Dallas	SSN-700	I	General Dynamics Electric Boat, Groton	31 January 1973	9 October 1976	28 April 1979	18 July 1981	4 April 2018	36 years, 8 months and 17 days	Stricken, final disposition pending	N/A
La Jolla	SSN-701/ MTS-701	I	General Dynamics Electric Boat, Groton	10 December 1973	16 October 1976	11 August 1979	24 October 1981	15 November 2019	38 years and 22 days	Converted to a moored training ship for the Nuclear Power School as of 2020	Charleston, SC
Phoenix	SSN-702	I	General Dynamics Electric Boat, Groton	31 October 1973	30 July 1977	8 December 1979	19 December 1981	29 July 1998	16 years, 7 months and 10 days	Disposed of by submarine recycling	N/A
Boston	SSN-703	I	General Dynamics Electric Boat, Groton	10 December 1973	11 August 1978	19 April 1980	30 January 1982	19 November 1999	17 years, 9 months and 20 days	Disposed of by submarine recycling	N/A
Baltimore	SSN-704	I	General Dynamics Electric Boat, Groton	31 October 1973	21 May 1979	13 December 1980	24 July 1982	10 July 1998	15 years, 11 months and 16 days	Disposed of by submarine recycling	N/A
City of Corpus Christi	SSN-705	I	General Dynamics Electric Boat, Groton	31 October 1973	4 September 1979	25 April 1981	8 January 1983	3 August 2017	34 years, 6 months and 26 days	Disposed of by submarine recycling	N/A
Albuquerque	SSN-706	I	General Dynamics Electric Boat, Groton	31 October 1973	27 December 1979	13 March 1982	21 May 1983	27 February 2017	33 years, 9 months and 6 days	Stricken, final disposition pending	N/A
Portsmouth	SSN-707	I	General Dynamics Electric Boat, Groton	10 December 1973	8 May 1980	18 September 1982	1 October 1983	10 September 2004	20 years, 11 months and 9 days	Disposed of by submarine recycling	N/A
Minneapolis-Saint Paul	SSN-708	I	General Dynamics Electric Boat, Groton	31 October 1973	20 January 1981	19 March 1983	10 March 1984	28 August 2008	24 years, 5 months and 18 days	Disposed of by submarine recycling	N/A
Hyman G. Rickover (ex-Providence)	SSN-709	I	General Dynamics Electric Boat, Groton	10 December 1973	24 July 1981	27 August 1983	21 July 1984	14 December 2006	22 years, 4 months and 23 days	Disposed of by submarine recycling	N/A
Augusta	SSN-710	I	General Dynamics Electric Boat, Groton	10 December 1973	1 April 1983	21 January 1984	19 January 1985	11 February 2009	24 years and 23 days (0 months)	Disposed of by submarine recycling	N/A
San Francisco	SSN-711/ MTS-711	I	Newport News Shipbuilding, Newport News	1 August 1975	26 May 1977	27 October 1979	24 April 1981	5 May 2022	41 years and 21 days	Converted to a moored training ship for the Nuclear Power School as of 2021	Charleston, SC
Atlanta	SSN-712	I	Newport News Shipbuilding, Newport News	1 August 1975	17 August 1978	16 August 1980	6 March 1982	16 December 1999	17 years, 9 months and 10 days	Disposed of by submarine recycling	N/A
Houston	SSN-713	I	Newport News Shipbuilding, Newport News	1 August 1975	29 January 1979	21 March 1981	25 September 1982	26 August 2016	33 years, 11 months and 1 day	Stricken, final disposition pending	N/A
Norfolk	SSN-714	I	Newport News Shipbuilding, Newport News	20 February 1976	1 August 1979	31 October 1981	21 May 1983	11 December 2014	31 years, 6 months and 20 days	Stricken, final disposition pending	N/A
Buffalo	SSN-715	I	Newport News Shipbuilding, Newport News	23 February 1976	25 January 1980	8 May 1982	5 November 1983	30 January 2019	35 years, 2 months and 25 days	Stricken, final disposition pending	N/A
Salt Lake City	SSN-716	I	Newport News Shipbuilding, Newport News	15 September 1977	26 August 1980	16 October 1982	12 May 1984	15 January 2006	21 years, 8 months and 3 days	Disposed of by submarine recycling	N/A
Olympia	SSN-717	I	Newport News Shipbuilding, Newport News	15 September 1977	31 March 1981	30 April 1983	17 November 1984	5 February 2021	36 years, 2 months and 19 days	Stricken, final disposition pending	N/A
Honolulu	SSN-718	I	Newport News Shipbuilding, Newport News	15 September 1977	10 November 1981	24 September 1983	6 July 1985	2 November 2007	22 years, 4 months and 27 days	Disposed of by submarine recycling	N/A
Providence	SSN-719	II with VLS	General Dynamics Electric Boat, Groton	16 April 1979	14 October 1982	4 August 1984	27 July 1985	22 August 2022	37 years and 26 days	Stricken, final disposition pending	N/A
Pittsburgh	SSN-720	II with VLS	General Dynamics Electric Boat, Groton	16 April 1979	15 April 1983	8 December 1984	23 November 1985	15 April 2020	34 years, 4 months and 23 days	Stricken, final disposition pending	N/A
Chicago	SSN-721	II with VLS	Newport News Shipbuilding, Newport News	13 August 1981	5 January 1983	13 October 1984	27 September 1986	21 July 2023	36 years, 9 months and 24 days	Stricken, final disposition pending	N/A
Key West	SSN-722	II with VLS	Newport News Shipbuilding, Newport News	13 August 1981	6 July 1983	20 July 1985	12 September 1987	12 September 2025	38 years	Stricken, final disposition pending	N/A
Oklahoma City	SSN-723	II with VLS	Newport News Shipbuilding, Newport News	13 August 1981	4 January 1984	2 November 1985	9 July 1988	9 September 2022	34 years and 2 months	Stricken, final disposition pending	N/A
Louisville	SSN-724	II with VLS	General Dynamics Electric Boat, Groton	11 February 1982	24 September 1984	14 December 1985	8 November 1986	9 March 2021	34 years, 4 months and 1 day	Stricken, final disposition pending	N/A
Helena	SSN-725	II with VLS	General Dynamics Electric Boat, Groton	19 April 1982	28 March 1985	28 June 1986	11 July 1987	25 July 2025	38 years and 14 days	Stricken, final disposition pending	N/A
Newport News	SSN-750	II with VLS	Newport News Shipbuilding, Newport News	19 April 1982	3 March 1984	15 March 1986	3 June 1989	Inactive as of 31 January 2026		Active (Reserve), Awaiting Decommissioning	Norfolk, VA
San Juan	SSN-751	III 688i (Improved)	General Dynamics Electric Boat, Groton	30 November 1982	9 August 1985	6 December 1986	6 August 1988	6 August 2026	38 years	Stricken, final disposition pending	N/A
Pasadena	SSN-752	III 688i (Improved)	General Dynamics Electric Boat, Groton	30 November 1982	20 December 1985	12 September 1987	11 February 1989	Inactive as of 31 December 2024		Active (Reserve), Awaiting Decommissioning	Norfolk, VA
Albany	SSN-753	III 688i (Improved)	Newport News Shipbuilding, Newport News	29 November 1983	22 April 1985	13 June 1987	7 April 1990			Active, in commission	Groton, CT
Topeka	SSN-754	III 688i (Improved)	General Dynamics Electric Boat, Groton	28 November 1983	13 May 1986	23 January 1988	21 October 1989	Inactive as of 31 January 2025		Active (Reserve), Awaiting Decommissioning	Pearl Harbor, HI
Miami	SSN-755	III 688i (Improved)	General Dynamics Electric Boat, Groton	28 November 1983	24 October 1986	12 November 1988	30 June 1990	28 March 2014	23 years, 8 months and 28 days	Stricken, final disposition pending	N/A
Scranton	SSN-756	III 688i (Improved)	Newport News Shipbuilding, Newport News	26 November 1984	29 August 1986	3 July 1989	26 January 1991	Proposed 2026		Active, in commission	San Diego, CA
Alexandria	SSN-757	III 688i (Improved)	General Dynamics Electric Boat, Groton	26 November 1984	19 June 1987	23 June 1990	29 June 1991	Inactive as of 4 August 2026		Active (Reserve), Awaiting Decommissioning	N/A
Asheville	SSN-758	III 688i (Improved)	Newport News Shipbuilding, Newport News	26 November 1984	9 January 1987	24 February 1990	28 September 1991			Active, in commission	Apra Harbor, GU
Jefferson City	SSN-759	III 688i (Improved)	Newport News Shipbuilding, Newport News	26 November 1984	21 September 1987	17 August 1990	29 February 1992			Active, in commission	Pearl Harbor, HI
Annapolis	SSN-760	III 688i (Improved)	General Dynamics Electric Boat, Groton	21 March 1986	15 June 1988	18 May 1991	11 April 1992	Proposed 2027		Active, in commission	Apra Harbor, GU
Springfield	SSN-761	III 688i (Improved)	General Dynamics Electric Boat, Groton	21 March 1986	29 January 1990	4 January 1992	9 January 1993			Active, in commission	Apra Harbor, GU
Columbus	SSN-762	III 688i (Improved)	General Dynamics Electric Boat, Groton	21 March 1986	9 January 1991	1 August 1992	24 July 1993			Active, in commission	Pearl Harbor, HI
Santa Fe	SSN-763	III 688i (Improved)	General Dynamics Electric Boat, Groton	21 March 1986	9 July 1991	12 December 1992	8 January 1994			Active, in commission	San Diego, CA
Boise	SSN-764	III 688i (Improved)	Newport News Shipbuilding, Newport News	6 February 1987	25 August 1988	23 March 1991	7 November 1992	Inactive as of 10 April 2026		Awaiting decommissioning	Norfolk, VA
Montpelier	SSN-765	III 688i (Improved)	Newport News Shipbuilding, Newport News	6 February 1987	19 May 1989	23 August 1991	13 March 1993			Active, in commission	Norfolk, VA
Charlotte	SSN-766	III 688i (Improved)	Newport News Shipbuilding, Newport News	6 February 1987	17 August 1990	3 October 1992	16 September 1994			Active, in commission	Pearl Harbor, HI
Hampton	SSN-767	III 688i (Improved)	Newport News Shipbuilding, Newport News	6 February 1987	2 March 1990	3 April 1992	6 November 1993			Active, in commission	San Diego, CA
Hartford	SSN-768	III 688i (Improved)	General Dynamics Electric Boat, Groton	30 June 1988	22 February 1992	4 December 1993	10 December 1994			Active, in commission	Groton, CT
Toledo	SSN-769	III 688i (Improved)	Newport News Shipbuilding, Newport News	10 June 1988	6 May 1991	28 August 1993	24 February 1995			Active, in commission	Groton, CT
Tucson	SSN-770	III 688i (Improved)	Newport News Shipbuilding, Newport News	10 June 1988	15 August 1991	20 March 1994	18 August 1995			Active, in commission	Pearl Harbor, HI
Columbia	SSN-771	III 688i (Improved)	General Dynamics Electric Boat, Groton	14 December 1988	21 April 1993	24 September 1994	9 October 1995			Active, in commission	Pearl Harbor, HI
Greeneville	SSN-772	III 688i (Improved)	Newport News Shipbuilding, Newport News	14 December 1988	28 February 1992	17 September 1994	16 February 1996			Active, in commission	Pearl Harbor, HI
Cheyenne	SSN-773	III 688i (Improved)	Newport News Shipbuilding, Newport News	28 November 1989	6 July 1992	16 April 1995	13 September 1996			Active, in commission	Norfolk, VA

Among the retired boats, a few were in commission for nearly 40 years or more, including Bremerton (40), Jacksonville (40), La Jolla (38) and San Francisco (41). With a wide variance in longevity, twelve boats were laid up halfway through their projected lifespans, with Baltimore being the youngest to be retired at only 15 years, 11 months. Another five boats were also laid up early (within 20–25 years), due to their midlife reactor refueling being cancelled, and one was lost during overhaul due to arson. All retired boats have been or will be scrapped per the Navy's Ship-Submarine Recycling Program. In addition, two boats, La Jolla and San Francisco, have been converted to moored training ships.

== In popular culture ==
- Los Angeles-class submarines have been featured prominently in numerous Tom Clancy literary works and film adaptations, most notably USS Dallas in The Hunt for Red October. Other appearances include USS Chicago in the novel Red Storm Rising and USS Cheyenne in SSN. In addition to fictional works, Clancy's 1993 non-fiction book Submarine: A Guided Tour Inside a Nuclear Warship features an in-depth exploration of USS Miami.
- USS Alexandria was used in the 2008 made-for-television film Stargate: Continuum.
- 688 Attack Sub, a 1989 MS-DOS submarine simulator, allowed the player to control a Los Angeles-class submarine during a set of Cold War missions. The game was also released for the Sega Genesis console.
- Jane's 688(i) Hunter/Killer, Sub Command, Dangerous Waters, developed by Sonalysts Inc., and Cold Waters by Killerfish Games, are video games where players control a 688i Los Angeles-class submarine.

== See also ==
- List of active Los Angeles-class submarines by homeport
- List of submarine classes of the United States Navy
- List of submarines of the United States Navy
- List of submarine classes in service
- Submarines in the United States Navy
- Cruise missile submarine
- Attack submarine
