= S6G reactor =

Naval nuclear reactor used by US Navy

The S6G reactor is a naval reactor used by the United States Navy to provide electricity generation and propulsion on Los Angeles-class attack submarines. The S6G designation stands for:

- S = Submarine platform
- 6 = Sixth generation core designed by the contractor
- G = General Electric was the contracted designer

== Design ==
The S6G reactor was designed by Knolls Atomic Power Laboratory under a contract with General Electric for use on the Los Angeles-class attack submarines. The S6G reactor plant consists of the reactor coolant, steam generation, and other support systems that supply steam to the engine room. The S6G is a 165 megawatt (MW) reactor driving two 26 MW steam turbines.

The Los Angeles-class engine room also contains the steam turbines that generate electricity and drive the propeller shaft. While exact specifications are classified, the S6G reactor can propel a Los Angeles-class submarine at over 15 knots (28 km/h) when surfaced and over 25 knots (46 km/h) while submerged.

The S6G reactor plant was originally designed to use the D1G-2 core, similar to the D2G reactor used on the Bainbridge-class guided missile cruiser. All Los Angeles-class submarines from USS Providence (SSN-719) on were built with a D2W core. The D1G-2 cores are being replaced with D2W cores when the boats are refueled.
