= List of Sturgeon-class submarines =

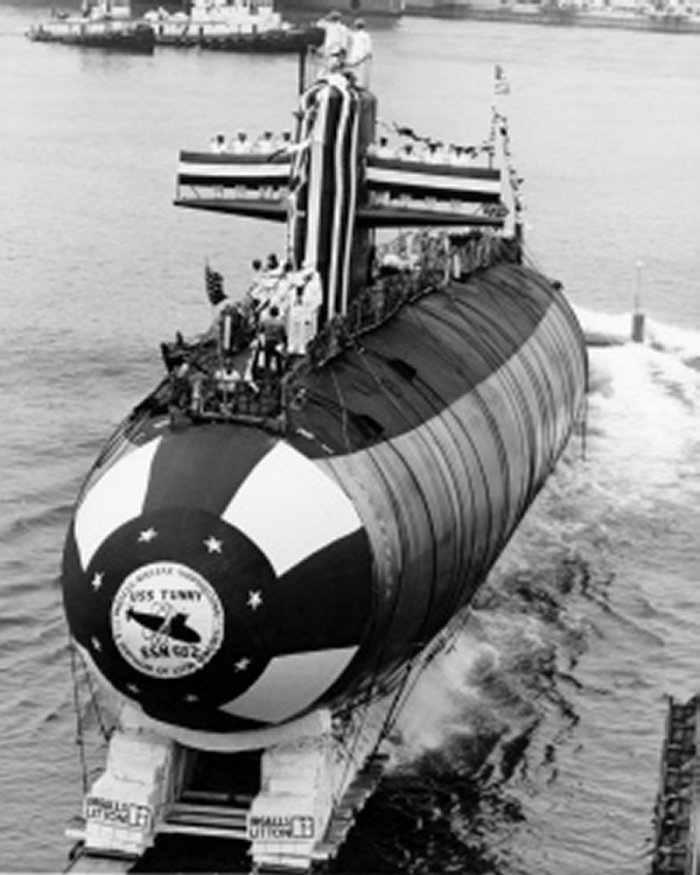
Launching of USS Tunny (SSN-682)

Named after the lead boat, the Sturgeon class of nuclear-powered fast attack submarines (SSN) served with the United States Navy from the late 1960s to the mid-2000s. With a submerged displacement of 4,780 tons, its successors were the 6,920-ton Los Angeles class, the first of which was commissioned in 1976. The Sturgeon class was designed with digital combat systems and more quieting features than its predecessor, the Thresher/Permit class. As SSNs, Sturgeon-class submarines were designed to primarily perform anti-submarine warfare operations. Seven different primary contractors constructed the 37 boats of the class, making it the second-most numerous nuclear-powered warship class in the world after the 62-boat Los Angeles class.

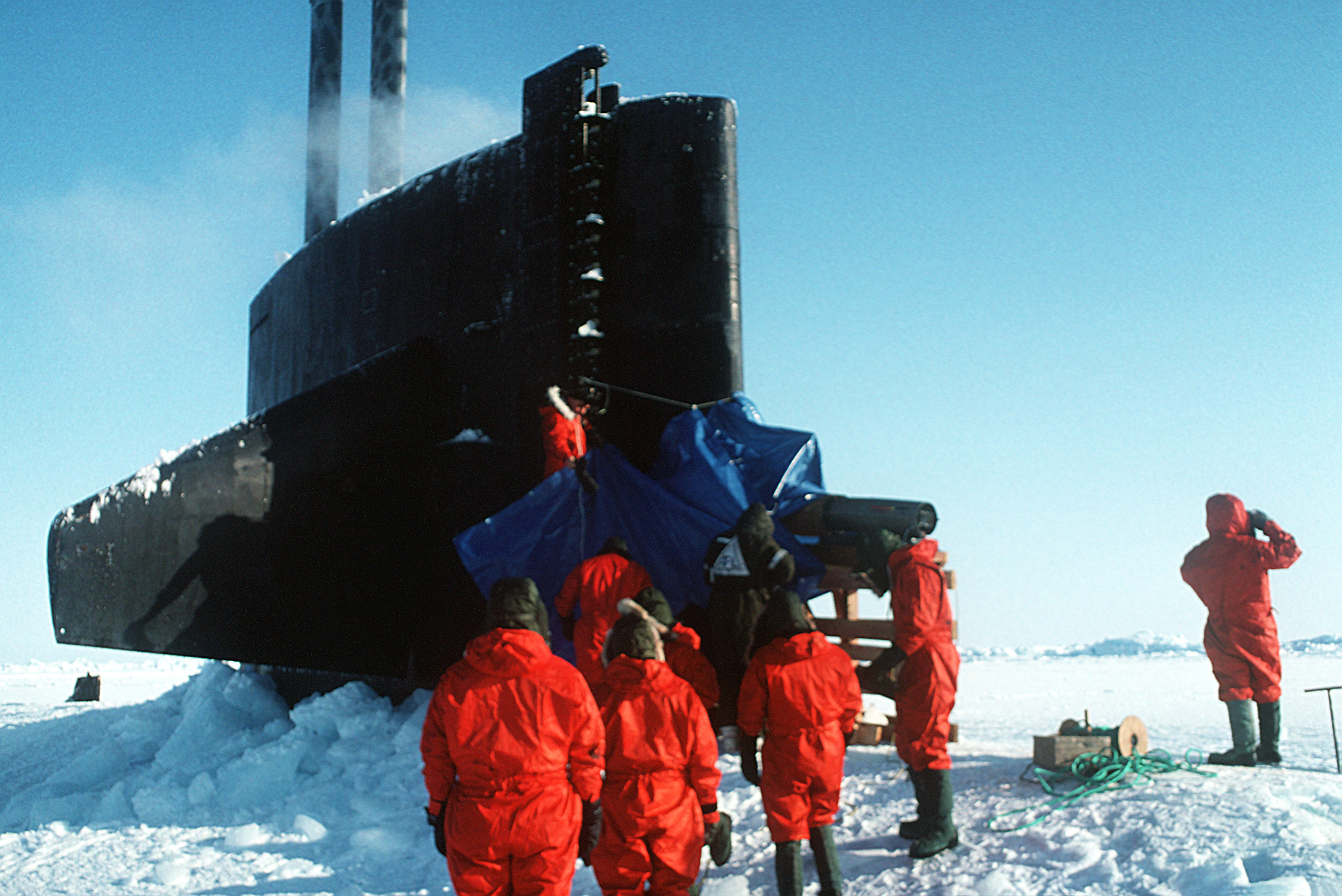
USS Pargo (SSN-650) surfaced in Arctic ice.

In the late 1950s, the U.S. Navy identified the need to reengineer the Thresher/Permit class, the boats of which were then being constructed. In pursuit of high-speed operations, many design aspects were sacrificed. To address such deficiences, the Sturgeon class was created. This class differed from its predecessor by having an enlarged and relocated sail to accommodate additional external sensors; a second periscope was also added. Additionally, the fairwater planes on the sail could be rotated 90 degrees to allow breaking through relatively thin ice. The hull was lengthened from about 278 ft (85 m) to about 292 ft (89 m); this, coupled with the larger sail, reduced the class's speed by 2 knots (2.3 mph; 3.7 km/h) compared to the Thresher/Permit class. Internally, the class's layout was rearranged to improve habitability and to admit more weapons as compared to its predecessor. The class was further redesigned with SUBSAFE program rules following the loss of Thresher in April 1963. Among the range of armaments used by the class were the Mark 45 nuclear torpedo, Mark 48 torpedo, the Harpoon anti-ship missile, the Tomahawk cruise missile, and the SUBROC nuclear anti-submarine missile.

Starting with USS Archerfish (SSN-678), the hull was lengthened by 10 ft (3 m) to allow a larger living and working space compared to previous boats of the class. Nine boats incorporated this extension. Other modifications included the addition of a Dry Deck Shelter (an external lockout chamber capable of accommodating SEAL Delivery Vehicles) to six boats to enable covert insertion and extraction of U.S. Navy SEALs.

== Boats ==
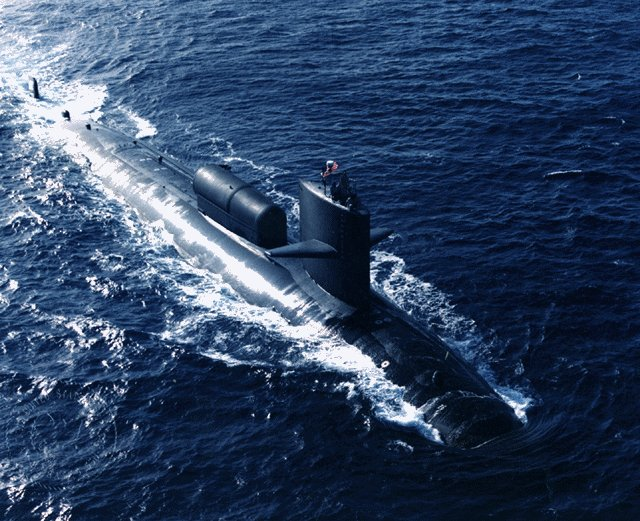
USS William H. Bates (SSN-680) carrying a Dry Deck Shelter

In October 1961, General Dynamics Electric Boat was awarded the contract to construct the lead boat of the class, USS Sturgeon (SSN-637). Laid down in August 1963, the boat was launched in February 1966 before being commissioned in March 1966. Electric Boat would be the largest builder of the class, responsible for twelve boats in total. It was followed by Newport News Shipbuilding (with nine boats), Ingalls Shipbuilding (seven boats), San Francisco Naval Shipyard/Mare Island Naval Shipyard (five boats), General Dynamics Quincy Shipbuilding Division and Portsmouth Naval Shipyard (two boats each). The final boat of the class, USS Richard B. Russell (SSN-687), was commissioned in August 1975.

USS Glenard P. Lipscomb (SSN-685) was a significant modification of the Sturgeon design for an experimental propulsion system, and so was a one-ship class. USS Narwhal (SSN-671) was also identified as such during her construction, but later was admitted to have been a unique design with very little in common with the Sturgeon class.

Originally designed for 20-year operational lives, boats of the Sturgeon class had this lengthened to 30 years, with a further planned three-year extension. However, many boats were retired prior to the limit to avoid costly nuclear refueling. The first to be decommissioned, in October 1991, was USS Sea Devil; the last, USS Parche (SSN-683), was decommissioned in July 2005. By then, the Los Angeles-, Seawolf-, and Virginia-class SSNs had entered service.

Keys

- Boats in orange(†) were built by General Dynamics Electric Boat in Groton, Connecticut.
- Boats in yellow(#) were built by Newport News Shipbuilding in Newport News, Virginia.
- Boats in lawn green(‡) were built by Ingalls Shipbuilding in Pascagoula, Mississippi.
- Boats in aqua(↓) were built by San Francisco Naval Shipyard/Mare Island Naval Shipyard in Vallejo, California.
- Boats in sandy brown(§) were built by General Dynamics Quincy Shipbuilding Division in Quincy, Massachusetts.
- Boats in red(↑) were built by Portsmouth Naval Shipyard in Kittery, Maine.

Length	Boat	Hull number	Ordered	Laid down	Launched	Delivered	Commissioned	Decommissioned	Period of service	Fate	Ref.
292 ft (89 m)	Sturgeon †	SSN-637	30 November 1961	10 August 1963	26 February 1966	3 March 1967	3 March 1967	1 August 1994	27.4	Disposed of by recycling; sail transferred to museum	
292 ft (89 m)	Whale §	SSN-638	30 November 1961	27 May 1964	14 October 1966	26 October 1968	12 October 1968	25 June 1996	27.7	Disposed of by recycling	
292 ft (89 m)	Tautog ‡	SSN-639	30 November 1961	27 January 1964	15 April 1967	30 August 1968	17 August 1968	31 March 1997	28.6	Disposed of by recycling	
292 ft (89 m)	Grayling ↑	SSN-646	5 September 1962	12 May 1964	22 June 1967	10 December 1969	11 October 1969	18 July 1997	27.8	Disposed of by recycling	
292 ft (89 m)	Pogy ‡	SSN-647	23 March 1963	5 May 1964	3 June 1967	15 May 1971	15 May 1971	11 June 1999	28.1	Disposed of by recycling	
292 ft (89 m)	Aspro ‡	SSN-648	23 March 1963	23 November 1964	29 November 1967	20 February 1969	20 February 1969	31 March 1995	26.1	Disposed of by recycling	
292 ft (89 m)	Sunfish §	SSN-649	23 March 1963	15 January 1965	14 October 1966	15 March 1969	15 March 1969	31 March 1997	28.0	Disposed of by recycling	
292 ft (89 m)	Pargo †	SSN-650	23 March 1963	3 June 1964	17 September 1966	23 December 1967	5 January 1968	14 April 1995	27.3	Disposed of by recycling	
292 ft (89 m)	Queenfish #	SSN-651	23 March 1963	11 May 1964	25 February 1966	6 December 1966	6 December 1966	14 April 1992	25.4	Disposed of by recycling	
292 ft (89 m)	Puffer ‡	SSN-652	23 March 1963	8 February 1965	30 March 1968	31 July 1969	9 August 1969	12 July 1996	26.9	Disposed of by recycling	
292 ft (89 m)	Ray #	SSN-653	23 March 1963	4 January 1965	21 June 1966	19 April 1967	12 April 1967	16 March 1993	25.9	Disposed of by recycling	
292 ft (89 m)	Sand Lance ↑	SSN-660	24 October 1963	15 January 1965	11 November 1969	1 October 1971	25 September 1971	7 August 1998	26.9	Disposed of by recycling	
292 ft (89 m)	Lapon #	SSN-661	24 October 1963	26 July 1965	16 December 1966	14 December 1967	14 December 1967	8 August 1992	24.7	Disposed of by recycling	
292 ft (89 m)	Gurnard ↓	SSN-662	24 October 1963	22 December 1964	20 May 1967	8 December 1968	6 December 1968	28 April 1995	26.4	Disposed of by recycling	
292 ft (89 m)	Hammerhead #	SSN-663	28 May 1964	29 November 1965	14 April 1967	28 June 1968	28 June 1968	5 April 1995	26.8	Disposed of by recycling	
292 ft (89 m)	Sea Devil #	SSN-664	28 May 1964	12 April 1966	5 October 1967	–	30 January 1969	16 October 1991	22.7	Disposed of by recycling	
292 ft (89 m)	Guitarro ↓	SSN-665	18 December 1964	9 December 1965	27 July 1968	9 September 1972	9 September 1972	29 May 1992	19.7	Disposed of by recycling	
292 ft (89 m)	Hawkbill	SSN-666	18 December 1964	12 September 1966	12 April 1969	1 March 1971	4 February 1971	15 March 2000	29.1	Disposed of by recycling	
292 ft (89 m)	Bergall †	SSN-667	9 March 1965	16 April 1966	17 February 1968	9 June 1969	13 June 1969	6 June 1996	27.0	Disposed of by recycling	
292 ft (89 m)	Spadefish #	SSN-668	9 March 1965	21 December 1966	15 May 1968	14 August 1969	14 August 1969	11 April 1997	27.7	Disposed of by recycling	
292 ft (89 m)	Seahorse †	SSN-669	9 March 1965	13 August 1966	15 June 1968	24 September 1969	19 September 1969	17 August 1995	25.9	Disposed of by recycling	
292 ft (89 m)	Finback #	SSN-670	9 March 1965	26 June 1967	7 December 1968	1 February 1970	4 February 1970	28 March 1997	27.1	Disposed of by recycling	
292 ft (89 m)	Pintado ↓	SSN-672	29 December 1965	27 October 1967	16 August 1969	1 September 1971	11 September 1971	26 February 1998	26.5	Disposed of by recycling	
292 ft (89 m)	Flying Fish †	SSN-673	15 July 1966	30 June 1967	17 May 1969	1 April 1970	29 April 1970	16 May 1996	26.0	Disposed of by recycling	
292 ft (89 m)	Trepang †	SSN-674	15 July 1966	28 October 1967	27 September 1969	1 August 1970	14 August 1970	1 June 1999	28.8	Disposed of by recycling	
292 ft (89 m)	Bluefish †	SSN-675	15 July 1966	13 March 1968	10 January 1970	1 January 1971	8 January 1971	31 May 1996	25.4	Disposed of by recycling	
292 ft (89 m)	Billfish †	SSN-676	15 July 1966	20 September 1968	1 May 1970	1 March 1971	12 March 1971	1 July 1999	28.3	Disposed of by recycling	
292 ft (89 m)	Drum ↓	SSN-677	15 March 1967	20 August 1968	23 May 1970	1 April 1972	15 April 1972	30 October 1995	23.5	Disposed of by recycling	
302 ft (92 m)	Archerfish †	SSN-678	25 June 1968	19 June 1969	16 January 1971	1 December 1971	17 December 1971	31 March 1998	26.3	Disposed of by recycling	
302 ft (92 m)	Silversides †	SSN-679	25 June 1968	13 October 1969	4 June 1971	5 May 1972	5 May 1972	21 July 1994	22.2	Disposed of by recycling	
302 ft (92 m)	William H. Bates (ex Redfish) ‡	SSN-680	25 June 1968	4 August 1969	11 December 1971	1 May 1973	5 May 1973	11 February 2000	26.8	Disposed of by recycling	
302 ft (92 m)	Batfish †	SSN-681	25 June 1968	9 February 1970	9 October 1971	1 September 1972	1 September 1972	17 March 1999	26.5	Disposed of by recycling	
302 ft (92 m)	Tunny ‡	SSN-682	25 June 1968	22 May 1970	10 June 1972	1 January 1974	26 January 1974	13 March 1998	24.1	Disposed of by recycling	
302 ft (92 m)	Parche ‡	SSN-683	25 June 1968	10 December 1970	13 January 1973	1 August 1974	17 August 1974	18 July 2005	30.9	Disposed of by recycling	
302 ft (92 m)	Cavalla †	SSN-684	24 July 1968	4 June 1970	19 February 1972	1 April 1973	9 February 1973	30 March 1998	25.1	Disposed of by recycling	
302 ft (92 m)	L. Mendel Rivers #	SSN-686	1 July 1969	26 June 1971	2 June 1973	1 December 1974	1 February 1975	10 May 2001	26.3	Disposed of by recycling	
302 ft (92 m)	Richard B. Russell #	SSN-687	25 July 1969	19 October 1971	12 January 1974	12 August 1975	16 August 1975	24 June 1994	18.9	Disposed of by recycling	

== Bibliography ==
- Chant, Chris (2005). Submarine Warfare Today. Leicester, United Kingdom: Silverdale Books. ISBN 1-84509-158-2. OCLC 156749009.
- Friedman, Norman (1994). U.S. submarines since 1945: an illustrated design history. Annapolis, Maryland: Naval Institute Press. ISBN 1-55750-260-9. OCLC 29477981.
