= Marjorie Sterrett Battleship Fund Award =

US Navy ship award

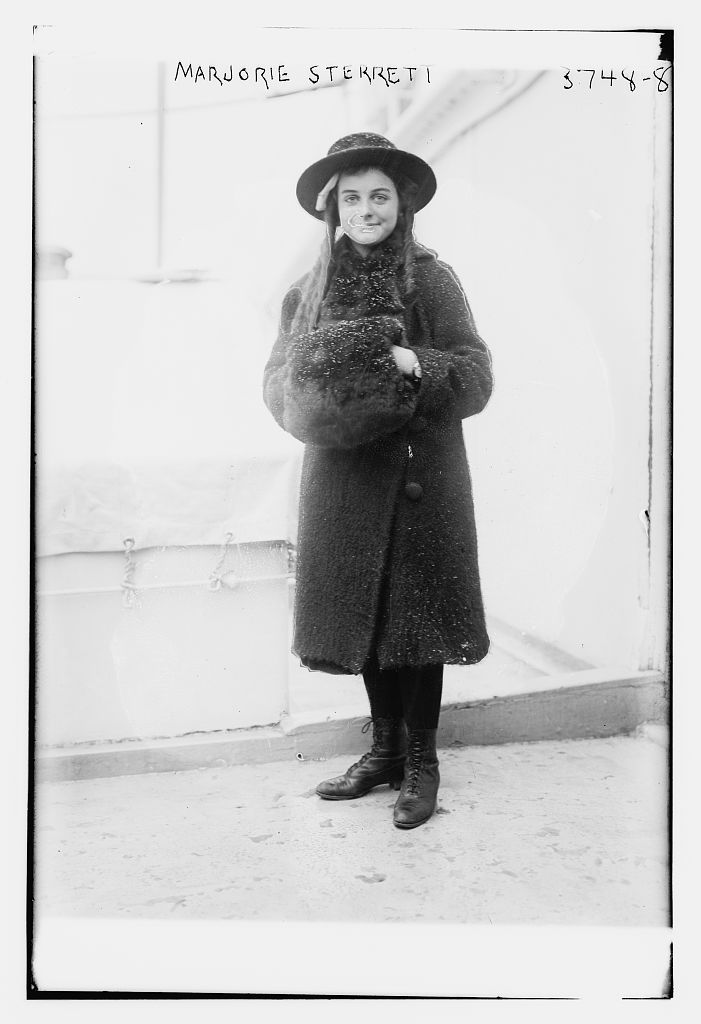
Marjorie Sterrett, prior to 1920.

The Marjorie Sterrett Battleship Fund Award is presented annually by the U.S. Navy's Chief of Naval Operations to one ship in the U.S. Atlantic Fleet and one in the U.S. Pacific Fleet.

Generally the recipient is the ship with the highest score in the fleet's annual competitions for Battle Effectiveness Awards, and is therefore often thought of as the fleet's most battle-ready ship. This isn't strictly correct, because it has been the policy to rotate eligibility for the award annually among the various type commands (aircraft carriers, submarines, amphibious ships, etc.).

The award includes a small monetary stipend (about $500 in 2004). Commanding officers receiving the award must put the money into the ship's recreation fund, where it can be spent on athletic equipment, prizes for athletic or marksmanship competitions, recreation room furniture, dances, parties, and similar recreational activities.

== History ==
The Marjorie Sterrett Battleship Fund was established in 1917 by the Tribune Association. It was initiated by a contribution which accompanied the following letter, printed on February 4, 1916:

"To the Editor of the New York Tribune

"Dear Sir:

"I read in your paper every morning a lot about preparedness. My grandpa and my great grandpa were soldiers. If I was a boy I would be a soldier, too, but I am not, so I want to do what I can to help. Mama gives me a dime every week for helping her. I am sending you this week's dime to help build a battleship for Uncle Sam. I know a lot of other kids would give their errand money if you would start a fund. I am 13 years old, and go to Public School No. 9, Brooklyn.

Truly Yours,

MARJORIE STERRETT

I am a true blue American and I want to see Uncle Sam prepared to lick all creation like John Paul Jones did.

P.S.—Please call the battleship America."

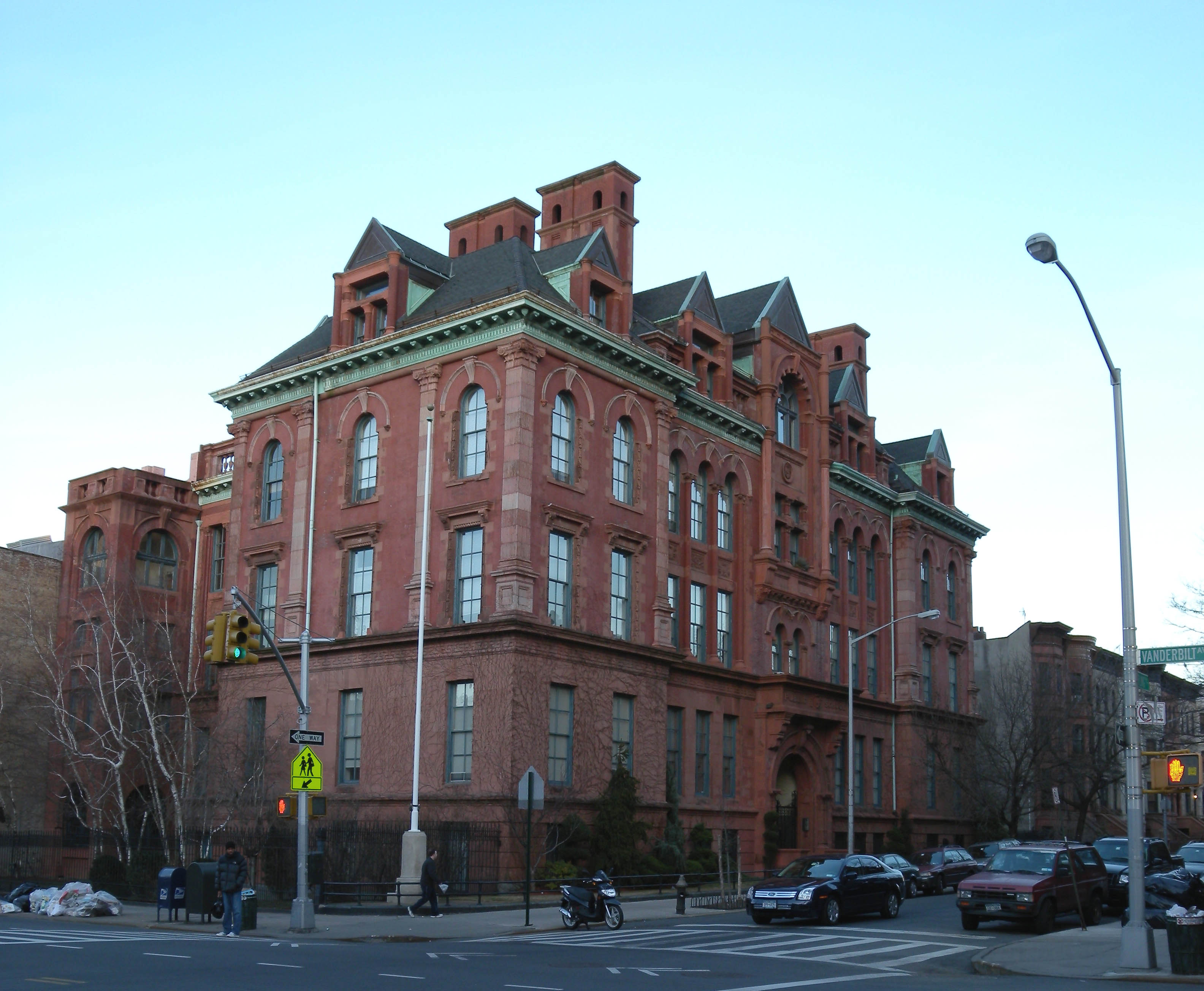
Public School 9, Brooklyn Marjorie's school

The letter was written during the buildup to America's entry into World War I, and it generated a huge response. Former president Theodore Roosevelt responded immediately with a handwritten letter and a dollar contribution; within a few days he met with Marjorie in Manhattan. The Tribune printed the name of every contributor, and newspapers across the country reprinted Marjorie's letter and received additional donations.

Ultimately 200,000 dimes were collected, each typically in the name of a child or a contributor's yet-to-be born grandchild. The money was offered to the Navy, but Secretary Josephus Daniels at first rejected it, citing legal prohibitions. A law was soon enacted allowing the Navy Department to accept the money, and by early 1918 the $20,000 (US$428,097 today) had been transferred to the government.

Prior to World War II, income from the fund was used to pay prizes annually to turret and gun crews making the highest scores in short-range battle practice, and to submarine crews making the highest scores in torpedo firing.

Since the end of World War II, the Navy has emphasized readiness and fitness of the ship rather than competition between individual departments.

Marjorie Sterrett-Raun died in March 1927 in Wattsburg, Pennsylvania.

== List of Post-WWII Winners ==
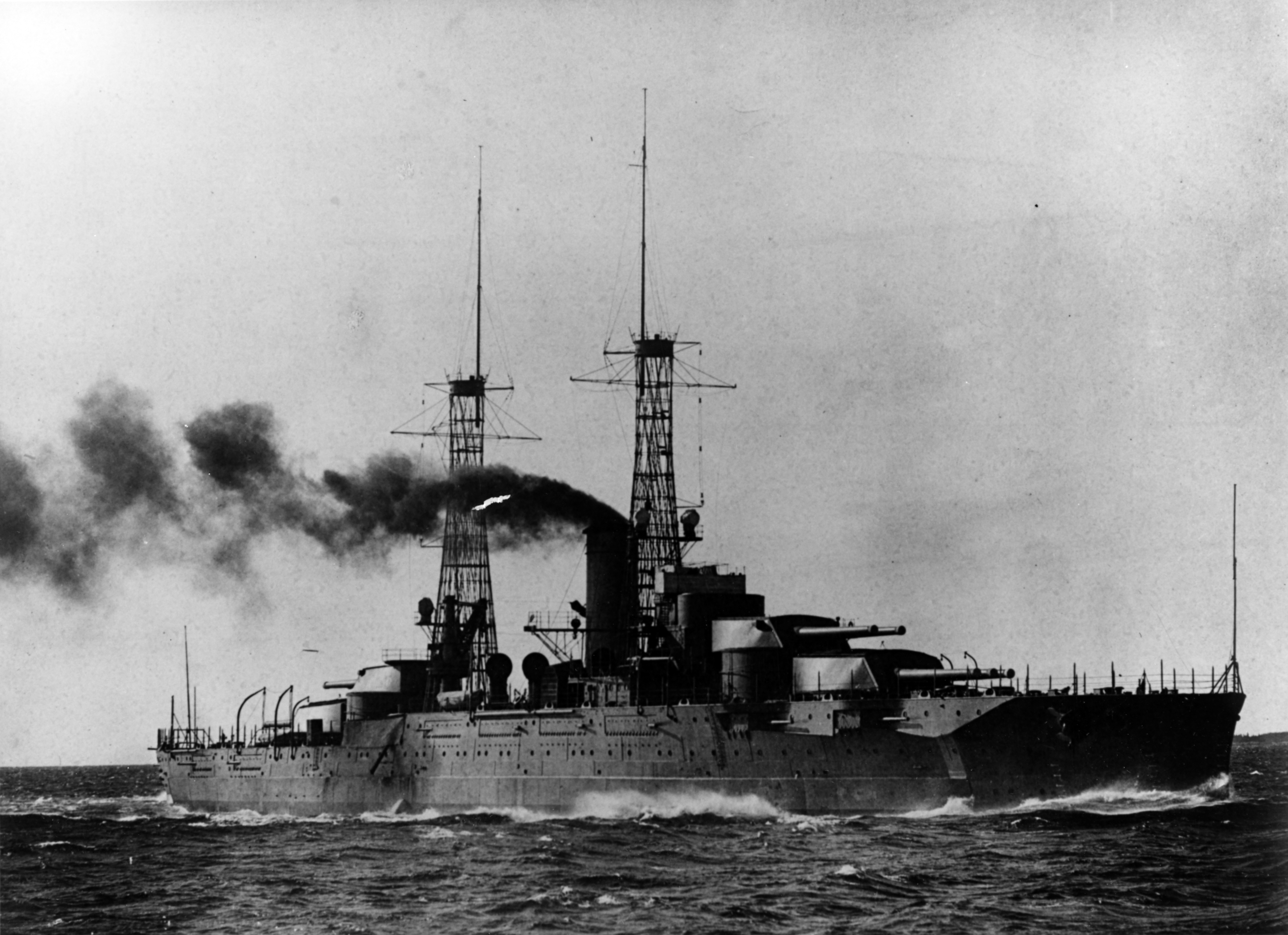
1917-era battleship USS Nevada

Year	Atlantic Fleet Winner	Pacific Fleet Winner
2024	USS Gerald R. Ford (CVN-78)	USS Carl Vinson (CVN-70)
2023	USS New York (LPD-21)	USS Makin Island (LHD-8)
2022	USS The Sullivans (DDG-68)	USS Benfold (DDG-65)
2021	USS New Hampshire (SSN-778)	USS Seawolf (SSN-21)
2020	USS Whirlwind (PC-11)	USS Pioneer (MCM-9)
2019	USS John C. Stennis (CVN-74)	USS Abraham Lincoln (CVN-72)
2018	USS Iwo Jima (LHD-7)	USS Ashland (LSD-48)
2017	USS Oscar Austin (DDG-79)	USS Sterett (DDG-104)
2016	USS Alaska (SSBN-732)	USS Cheyenne (SSN-773)
2015	USS Monsoon (PC-4)	USS Champion (MCM-4)
2014	USS George H. W. Bush (CVN-77)	USS George Washington (CVN-73)
2013	USS New York (LPD-21)	USS Boxer (LHD-4)
2012	USS Laboon (DDG-58)	USS Stethem (DDG-63)
2011	USS Newport News (SSN-750)	USS Hampton (SSN-767)
2010	Patrol Coastal Crew Lima (aboard USS Chinook (PC-9))	USS Patriot (MCM-7)
2009	USS Harry S. Truman (CVN-75)	USS Ronald Reagan (CVN-76)
2008	USS Kearsarge (LHD-3)	USS Blue Ridge (LCC-19)
2007	USS Carney (DDG-64)	USS Fitzgerald (DDG-62)
2006	USS Seawolf (SSN-21)	USS Tucson (SSN-770)
2005	USS Chief (MCM-14)	USS Safeguard (ARS-50)
2004	USS Harry S. Truman (CVN-75)	USS Carl Vinson (CVN-70)
2003	USS Scout (MCM-8)	USS Boxer (LHD-4)
2002	USS Leyte Gulf (CG-55)	USS Milius (DDG-69)
2001	USS Pennsylvania (SSBN-735) (G)	USS Santa Fe (SSN-763)
2000	USS Grapple (ARS-53)	USS Salvor (ARS-52)
1999	USS Dwight D. Eisenhower (CVN-69)	USS Constellation (CV-64)
1998	USS Wasp (LHD-1)	USS Belleau Wood (LHA-3)
1997	USS Normandy (CG-60)	USS Cowpens (CG-63)
1996	USS Boston (SSN-703)	USS Henry M. Jackson (SSBN-730)
1995	USS Edenton (ATS-1)	USS Salvor (ARS-52)
1994	USS George Washington (CVN-73)	USS Kitty Hawk (CV-63)
1993	USS Guam (LPH-9)	USS Comstock (LSD-45)
1992	USS Yorktown (CG-48)	USS Princeton (CG-59)
1991	USS Oklahoma City (SSN-723)	USS Florida (SSBN-728)
1990	USS Yosemite (AD-19)	USS Samuel Gompers (AD-37)
1989	USS Forrestal (CV-59)	USS Enterprise (CVN-65)
1988	USS Inflict (MSO-456)	USS Duluth (LPD-6)
1987	USS Kidd (DDG-993)	USS Fox (CG-33)
1986	USS Finback (SSN-670)	USS Plunger (SSN-595)
1985	USS Platte (AO-186)	USS Roanoke (AOR-7)
1984	USS Independence (CV-62)	USS Kitty Hawk (CV-63)
1983	USS Spiegel Grove (LSD-32)	USS Duluth (LPD-6)
1982	USS King (DDG-41)	USS Bainbridge (CGN-25)
1981	USS Hammerhead (SSN-663)	USS Los Angeles (SSN-688)
1980	USS San Diego (AFS-6)	USS White Plains (AFS-4)
1979	USS John F. Kennedy (CVA-67)	USS Midway (CV-41)
1978	USS Manitowoc (LST-1180)	USS Los Angeles (SSN-688)
1977	USS Wainwright (CG-28)	USS Roark (FF-1053)
1976	USS Flying Fish (SSN-673)	USS Patrick Henry (SSBN-599)
1975	USS Kalamazoo (AOR-6)	USS Molala (ATF-106)
1974	USS John F. Kennedy (CVA-67)	USS Oriskany (CVA-34)
1973	USS Inchon (LPH-12)	USS Durham (LKA-114)
1972	USS Dupont (DD-941)	USS Waddell (DDG-24)
1971	USS Dash (MSO-428)	USS Energy (MSO-436)
1970	USS Lapon (SSN-661)	USS Catfish (SS-339)
1969	USS Sylvania (AFS-2)	USS Cree (ATF-84)
1968	USS Intrepid (CVS-11)	USS Coral Sea (CVA-43)
1967	USS Shadwell (LSD-15)	USS St. Francis River (LSMR-525)
1966	USS Harry E. Yarnell (CG-17)	USS John R. Craig (DD-885)
1965	USS Meadowlark (MSC-196)	USS Persistent (MSO-491)
1964	USS Shark (SSN-591)	USS Scamp (SSN-588)
1963	USS Thornback (SS-418)	USS Current (ARS-22)
1962	USS Lake Champlain (CVS-39); USS Newport News (CA-148); USS Joseph K. Taussig (DE-1030); USS Entemedor (SS-340); USS Amphion (AR-13); USS Grant County (LST-1174); USS Exploit (MSO-440)	USS Bon Homme Richard (CVA-31); USS Providence (CG-6); USS Rupertus (DD-851); USS Prime (MSO-466); USS Paul Revere (APA-248); USS Arikara (ATF-98); USS Sargo (SSN-583)
1961	USS Vulcan (AR-5); USS Proteus (AS-19); USS Little Rock (CLG-4); USS Wallace L. Lind (DD-703); USS Grant County (LST-1174); USS Ability (MSO-519); USS Forrestal (CV-59)	USS Somers (DD-947); USS Lipan (AT-85); USS Diodon (SS-349); USS Providence (CLG-6); USS Mathews (AKA-96); USS Whippoorwill (AMS-207); USS Ticonderoga (CV-14)
FY 1960	USS Blandy (DD-943); USS Rigel (AF-58)	USS Somers (DD-947); USS Mount Baker (AE-4)
1959	USS Randolph (CVS-15)	USS Hornet (CVS-12)
1958	USS Rankin (AKA-103)	USS Mahoning County (LST-914)
1950	USS Sea Robin (SS-407)	USS Charr (SS-328)
1949	USS Fiske (DD-842)	USS Newman K. Perry (DD-883)
1948	USS Providence (CL-82)	USS Helena (CA-75)

1948 was the first post-World War II year in which awards were made. Awards were discontinued in 1951 due to the Korean War, and were not reinstated until 1958.

14 ships received the award in 1961 and 1962.

The 1963 ship history for USS Enterprise (CVN-65) reported that they were awarded the (presumably 1962) Marjorie Sterrett Battleship Fund Award in August 1963.
