= Lapon =

Lapon may refer to:

- Lapon (fish), a type of scorpionfish
- USS Lapon, the name of more than one United States Navy ship
