= Michael DiMercurio =

American novelist

Michael DiMercurio is an American author of submarine fiction novels. DiMercurio was a 1980 honors graduate of the U.S. Naval Academy with a B.S. in mechanical engineering, a 1981 National Science Foundation Scholarship fellow at MIT with a master's degree in mechanical engineering, and an officer in the U.S. Navy's attack submarine force. DiMercurio served aboard the fast attack nuclear submarine USS Hammerhead from 1982 to 1985 as communications officer, electrical officer and main propulsion assistant. After sea duty, DiMercurio was an instructor at Annapolis in the Naval Systems Engineering Department, then went on to civilian industry as a project manager in chemical and power plant engineering and construction.

DiMercurio's writings have appeared on Military.com.

== Bibliography ==
=== Guided Tour ===
- The Complete Idiot’s Guide to Submarines (2003, coauthor)

=== Michael Pacino series ===
1. Voyage of the Devilfish (1992)
2. Attack of the Seawolf (1993)
3. Phoenix Sub Zero (1994)
4. Barracuda Final Bearing (1996)
5. Piranha Firing Point (1999)
6. Threat Vector (2000)
7. Terminal Run (2002)

=== Peter Vornado series ===
1. Emergency Deep (2017)
2. Vertical Dive (2018)

=== Anthony "Patch" Pacino series ===
1. Dark Transit (2021)
2. Panic Switch (2023)
3. Ambush of the Dragon (2025)
4. Lion of the Seven Seas (2025)
