= USS Rushmore (LSD-14) =

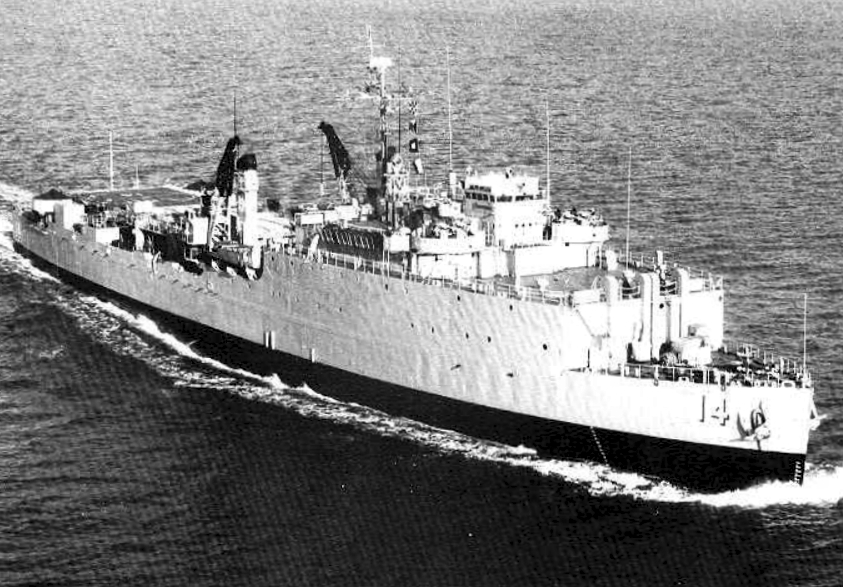
- USS Rushmore (LSD-14) underway in 1965

History

United States
- Name: USS Rushmore
- Namesake: Mount Rushmore
- Awarded: 1 September 1941
- Builder: Newport News Shipbuilding and Dry Dock Co.
- Laid down: 31 December 1943
- Launched: 10 May 1944
- Commissioned: 3 July 1944
- Decommissioned: 30 September 1970
- Stricken: 1 November 1976
- Fate: Sunk as a target, 16 April 1993

General characteristics
- Displacement: 7,930 tons (loaded), 4,032 tons (light draft)
- Length: 457 ft 9 in (139.5 m) overall
- Beam: 72 ft 2 in (22.0 m)
- Draft: 8 ft 2½ in (2.5 m) fwd, 10 ft ½ in (3.1 m) aft (light); 15 ft 5½ in (4.7 m) fwd, 16 ft 2 in (4.9 m) aft (loaded)
- Propulsion: 2 Babcock & Wilcox boilers, 2 Skinner Turbine Steam Engines, 2 propeller shafts – each shaft 3,700 hp, at 240 rpm total shaft horse power 7,400, 2 11 ft 9 in diameter, 9 ft 9 in pitch propellers
- Speed: 17 knots (31 km/h)
- Range: 8,000 nmi. at 15 knots; (15,000 km at 28 km/h)
- Boats & landing craft carried: 3 × LCT (Mk V or VI); each w/ 5 medium tanks or; 2 × LCT (Mk III or IV); each w/ 12 medium tanks or; 14 × LCM (Mk III); each w/ 1 medium tank; or 1,500 long tons cargo or; 47 × DUKW or; 41 × LVT or; Any combination of landing vehicles and landing craft up to capacity
- Capacity: 22 officers, 218 men
- Complement: 17 officers, 237 men (ship); 6 officers, 30 men (landing craft)
- Armament: 1 × 5 in / 38 cal. DP gun; 2 × 40 mm quad AA guns; 2 × 40 mm twin AA guns; 16 × 20 mm AA guns
- Aircraft carried: modified to accommodate helicopters on an added portable deck

USS Rushmore (LSD-14) was a Casa Grande-class dock landing ship of the United States Navy. She was named in honor of Mount Rushmore National Memorial in the Black Hills of South Dakota.

== Construction ==
The ship was originally authorized under the Lend-Lease Act as BAPM-6, the sixth of seven British Mechanized Artillery Transports. Reclassified a Landing Ship Dock, LSD-14, on 1 July 1942, the contract for LSD-14 was awarded to Newport News Shipbuilding and Dry Dock Co., Newport News, Virginia, on 10 September 1942. She was laid down on 31 December 1943, originally to be named HMS Sword, and later HMS Swashway (F145). While under construction, LSD-14, as well as -13 and -15, were reassigned back to the United States.

The ship was launched as Rushmore on 10 May 1944, sponsored by Miss Eleanor Vreelan Blewitt; and commissioned on 3 July 1944.

== 1944–1946 ==
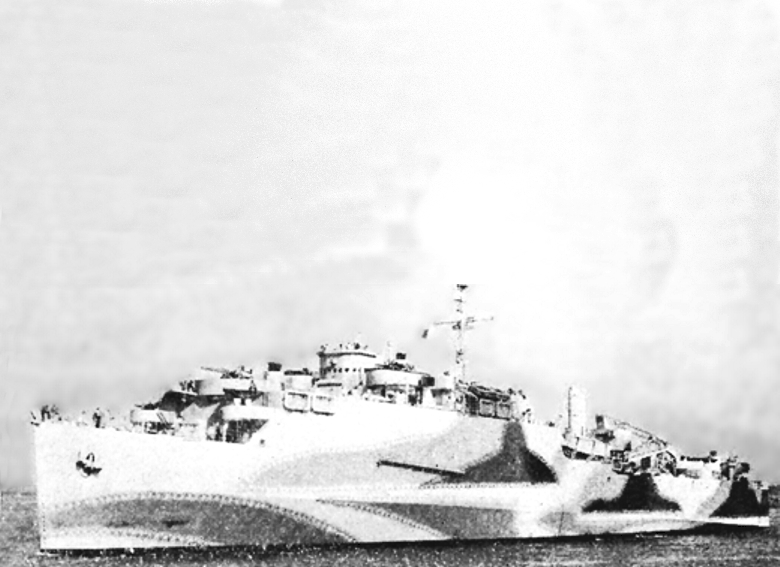
Rushmore in World War II.

Following shakedown in the Chesapeake Bay, landing ship dock Rushmore departed Norfolk on 5 August 1944 for the Pacific where she participated in four amphibious landings: the Battle of Leyte in October 1944; of Palawan in February 1945; of Mindanao in March 1945; and of Tarakan, Borneo, in May 1945.

Rushmore entered Leyte Gulf early in the morning of 20 October, and after discharging her LCMs from her boat well in one of the first waves to hit Yellow Beach near Dulag, Leyte, acted as repair ship for damaged landing craft. At Palawan on 28 February 1945, she landed Army-manned LCMs and other craft loaded with personnel and equipment of the 167th Field Artillery of the U.S. 8th Army. At Mindanao she carried a record 867 men for a 10 March landing on a beach north of Zamboanga City.

For the invasion of Tarakan on 1 May, Rushmore carried U.S. Army-manned LCMs loaded with Australian troops and light tanks. The Australian troops were a battalion of the famed "Rats of Tobruk" which had helped to chase German General Erwin Rommel out of Africa. During this landing, Rushmore was hit by a Japanese torpedo fired from the beach, which fortunately glanced off her hull without exploding or causing damage.

Returning to the Philippines, Rushmore loaded a 137-foot Japanese army submarine Yu 3 which she carried to San Francisco to serve as a display to help sell war bonds. In the United States from 2 to 27 June, Rushmore next carried landing craft from base to base in the South Pacific and was in Pearl Harbor when the war ended.

After the war, Rushmore operated in the Far East, particularly in occupied Japanese waters. She decommissioned 16 August 1946 and was mothballed in Pascagoula, Mississippi.

== 1950–1993 ==
Rushmore recommissioned at Charleston, S.C., on 21 September 1950, to begin a period of Atlantic Fleet service. Her next ten years included Caribbean exercises, Reserve cruises, a Mediterranean cruise, and regular Arctic trips to resupply the DEW Line bases. Rushmore was present for ceremonies at Istanbul, Turkey, in May 1954 on the occasion of the return of various small lend-lease vessels from the USSR. Rushmore returned these ex-Soviet Navy vessels to the United States.

On 16 May 1960, Rushmore departed Norfolk for a 6-month tour with the 6th Fleet. Returning to the Atlantic coast, she again deployed to the Mediterranean in late 1961. Returning to Little Creek, Va. on 22 February 1962, she operated in the Atlantic and Caribbean before a Fleet Rehabilitation and Modernization (FRAM) overhaul. On 9 November Rushmore hurriedly left the Bethlehem Steel Yards, Hoboken, N.J., because of the Cuban Missile Crisis and sailed to North Carolina to embark Marine units. However, with the easing of the situation in December, she returned to Little Creek.

On 4 February 1963, Rushmore began a 5-month deployment to the Mediterranean. From December until February 1964, she operated in the Caribbean, remaining near the Panama Canal Zone area during and after the riots there, ready to land troops to protect American citizens and Government property. Operating in the Atlantic and Caribbean until 6 October, she then departed the United States for Europe and the largest amphibious assault yet staged in peacetime, Operation Steel Pike. She returned to Little Creek on 26 November.

Rushmore was again deployed to the Mediterranean from 8 February to 24 July 1965, participating in joint Norwegian-American and French-American exercises. In the summer of 1966 Rushmore made two midshipmen cruises. For the next four years she alternated deployments to the 6th Fleet in the Mediterranean with operations off the U.S. Atlantic coast. She deployed to the Mediterranean November 1966 – May 1967, January–May 1968, and November 1969 – April 1970. Ordered inactivated soon after her return, Rushmore decommissioned 30 September 1970 and was transferred to the Maritime Administration's National Defense Reserve Fleet, at Fort Eustis on the James River, in February 1971. The old dock landing ship was finally sunk as a target on 16 April 1993.

== Awards ==
Rushmore earned three battle stars for World War II service.
