= USS Lapon =

USS Lapon has been the name of more than one United States Navy ship, and may refer to:

- USS Lapon (SS-260), a submarine in commission from 1943 to 1946 and in 1957
- USS Lapon (SSN-661), a submarine in commission from 1967 to 1992
