= USS Cambria =

1942 Bayfield-class attack transport

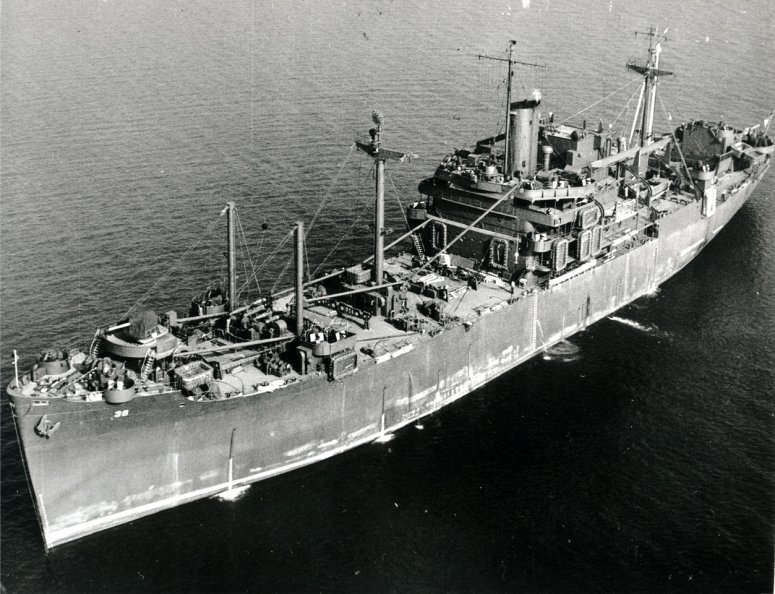
- Cambria underway, c. 1943

History

United States
- Name: USS Cambria
- Namesake: Cambria County, Pennsylvania
- Laid down: 1 July 1942, as SS Sea Swallow (built as C3-S-A2 hull, MC 271)
- Launched: 10 November 1942
- Christened: by Clara Scally Griffin, wife of William H. Griffin.
- Acquired: 4 May 1943
- Decommissioned: 30 June 1949
- Renamed: USS Cambria (APA-36), 10 November 1943
- Reclassified: From Transport (AP-81) to Attack Transport (APA-36), 1 February 1943
- Stricken: 1 September 1971
- Honours and awards: Six battle stars for World War II
- Fate: Sold 7 September 1971, scrapped 1972

General characteristics
- Class & type: Bayfield-class attack transport
- Displacement: 8,100 t.(lt), 16,100 t.(fl)
- Length: 492 ft 6 in (150 m)
- Beam: 69 ft 6 in (21 m)
- Draught: 26 ft 6 in (8.1 m)
- Propulsion: one General Electric geared turbine; two Combustion Engineering D-type boilers; one propeller; 8,500 Design shaft horsepower (6.3 MW)
- Speed: 18 knots (33 km/h).
- Boats & landing craft carried: 12 x LCVPs; 4 x LCMs (Mk-6); 3 x LCP(L)s (MK-IV)
- Capacity: 200,000 cubic feet (5,700 m^{3}), 4,700 tonnes (4,600 long tons; 5,200 short tons)
- Complement: 51 officers, 524 enlisted; Flag Accommodations: 43 officers, 108 enlisted; Troop Accommodations: 80 officers, 1,146 enlisted
- Armament: 2 x single 5 in (127 mm) 38 cal dual purpose gun mounts, one fore and one aft; 2 x single 40 mm AA gun mounts; 2 x twin 40 mm AA gun mounts; 18 x single 20 mm AA gun mounts

USS Cambria (APA-36) was a Bayfield-class attack transport acquired by the U.S. Navy for service in World War II. She was named after Cambria County, Pennsylvania

Cambria was launched 10 November 1942 as SS Sea Swallow by the Western Pipe and Steel Company, San Francisco, California, under a Maritime Commission contract; sponsored by Mrs. W. Griffin; acquired by the Navy 4 May 1943; placed in partial commission the same day, sailed to New York for decommissioning and conversion to an attack transport; and recommissioned 10 November 1943.

USS Cambria was taken out of service in 1970.

== World War II Pacific Theatre operations ==
=== Invasion of the Marshall Islands ===
Cambria departed Norfolk, Virginia, 11 December 1943 and arrived at Pearl Harbor on New Year's Day. After three weeks of intensive training, she sailed on 23 January 1944 for the invasion of the Marshall Islands, where she served as flagship for Majuro Attack Group during the landings.

=== Invasion of Saipan ===
After overhaul at San Francisco, California, and refresher training at Pearl Harbor, Cambria left 30 May 1944 for the Marianas invasion, again serving as flagship of an attack group. She took part in the assault on Saipan which began 15 June and during the next 24 days embarked 715 casualties of the desperate fighting on the island. Flying the flag of Commander task force TF 52, she led the invasion of Tinian (24 July-1 August); here she handled another 613 casualties.

=== Invasion of Leyte ===
Embarking U.S. Army troops and equipment at Honolulu, Cambria got underway 15 September 1944 for Manus, arriving 3 October to join the Southern Attack Group for the invasion of the Philippines. On 20 October she landed troops at Dulag, Leyte, in the first assault wave, then remained off Leyte as a casualty evacuation ship, receiving 70 wounded from the beach. Cambria lifted reinforcements from Oro Bay, New Guinea, to the Leyte area, then returned to New Guinea for rehearsal landings at Huon Gulf.

=== Invasion of Lingayen Gulf ===
Cambria landed troops at Lingayen Gulf during the invasion landings 10 January 1945, and after a reinforcement mission from San Pedro Bay to Lingayen Gulf, got underway for Tulagi, Florida Island, to train for the invasion of Okinawa.

=== Invasion of Okinawa ===
Cambria staged at Ulithi, then put her troops ashore at Okinawa on 1 April 1945. She completed her unloading two days later and sailed for San Pedro, California, arriving 3 May for an overhaul which lasted until the end of hostilities.

=== After hostilities ===
For the remainder of the year she was engaged in the redeployment of forces in the Far East, and then as a participant in the giant Magic Carpet operation which brought back demobilizing troops to the United States. Before returning to the U.S., the ship transported men from the 2nd Marine Division to Nagasaki, Japan, where it anchored 28 Sept.-Oct. 5, 1945. She departed Nagasaki on 5 October 1945 and picked up soldiers in Manila, Shanghai and Okinawa before returning to the U.S.

== Post-World War II operations ==
Sailing from San Francisco, California, 11 January 1946, Cambria arrived at Norfolk, Virginia, on the 27th for duty with the Atlantic Fleet. She received a new commanding officer, Captain Edward L. Woodyard, in February. She operated from her new home port on local exercises and training assaults in the Caribbean until placed out of commission in reserve 30 June 1949.

=== Suez Crisis ===
Recommissioned 15 September 1950 with the outbreak of war in Korea, Cambria, alternated local operations and training in the Caribbean and off Labrador with three tours of duty with the U.S. 6th Fleet in the Mediterranean. On her 1956 cruise with the 6th Fleet "Cambria" landed United Nations troops at Gaza during the Suez Crisis.

=== Beirut mission ===
Returning to Norfolk 2 February 1957, Cambria resumed operations and exercises in the Caribbean and along the eastern seaboard. This routine was interrupted in the summer of 1958, when, on 10 September, Cambria sailed to join the 6th Fleet in support of the American landings at Beirut, Lebanon. She remained at this port until 18 October 1958 and in the Mediterranean until the end of the year to complete a regular tour with the 6th Fleet.

She returned to the States in March 1959, visited Great Lakes ports during June and July in connection with the opening of the Saint Lawrence Seaway, and operated on the east coast. Cambria made another 6th Fleet cruise during the first half of 1960, then resumed U.S. East Coast operations for the remainder of the year. She was also involved in the Cuban Missile Crisis from 24 October to 5 December 1962. On 8 July 1969, she was involved in a collision with the USS Shadwell (LSD-15) during a night-time exercise off Malta.

=== End of service ===
Cambria was decommissioned 14 September 1970 and transferred to MARAD on 13 November 1970, and struck from the Naval Vessel Register 1 September 1971. She was sold for non-transportation use on 7 September 1971 to Caribbean Marine, Inc, and scrapped the following year.

== Awards ==
Cambria received six battle stars for World War II service:

- Marshall Islands operation
- Marianas operation
- Tinian capture and occupation
- Leyte operation
- Luzon operation
- Okinawa Gunto operation

Cambria also received the Armed Forces Expeditionary Medal for participating in the Cuban Missile Crisis.
