= USS Hawkbill (SSN-666) =

Sturgeon-class attack submarine of the United States Navy

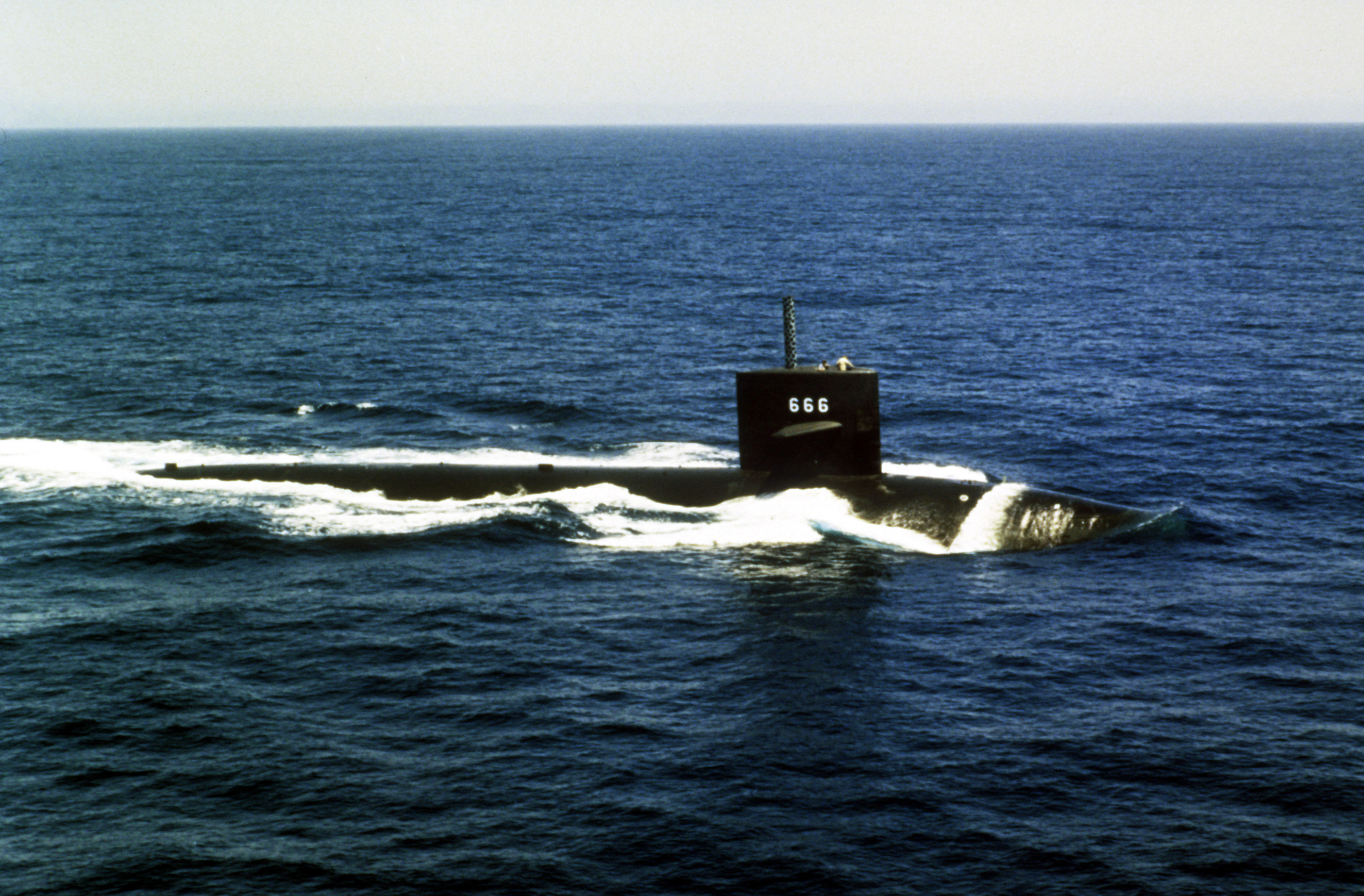
- USS Hawkbill (SSN-666) off Southern California on 1 February 1991

History

United States
- Name: USS Hawkbill (SSN-666)
- Namesake: Misspelling carried over from previous ship of the name (USS Hawkbill (SS-366)) of "hawksbill", a large sea turtle
- Ordered: 18 December 1964
- Builder: Mare Island Naval Shipyard, Vallejo, California
- Laid down: 12 September 1966
- Launched: 12 April 1969
- Sponsored by: Mrs. Bernard F. Roeder
- Commissioned: 4 February 1971
- Decommissioned: 15 March 2000
- Stricken: 15 March 2000
- Nickname(s): "The Devil Boat"; "Devilfish"
- Fate: Scrapping via Ship and Submarine Recycling Program begun 15 March 2000, completed 1 December 2000

General characteristics
- Class & type: Sturgeon-class attack submarine
- Displacement: 4,002 long tons (4,066 t) light; 4,294 long tons (4,363 t) full; 292 long tons (297 t) dead
- Length: 292 ft (89 m)
- Beam: 32 ft (9.8 m)
- Draft: 29 ft (8.8 m)
- Installed power: 15,000 shp (11,000 kW)
- Propulsion: One S5W nuclear reactor, two steam turbines, one screw
- Speed: 15 knots (28 km/h; 17 mph) surfaced; 25 knots (46 km/h; 29 mph) submerged
- Test depth: 1,300 ft (400 m)
- Complement: 109 (14 officers, 95 enlisted men)
- Armament: 4 × 21 in (533 mm) torpedo tubes

USS Hawkbill (SSN-666), a Sturgeon-class attack submarine, was the second ship of the United States Navy to be named for the hawksbill, a large sea turtle. The name perpetuated the inadvertent misspelling of "hawksbill" in the naming of the first ship of that name, USS Hawkbill (SS-366), a Balao-class submarine launched in 1944. USS Hawkbill (SSN-666) was the 18th of 39 Sturgeon-class nuclear-powered submarines that were built.

Hawkbill was sometimes called the "Devil Boat" or the "Devilfish" because of her hull number, 666, with the number of the beast.

== Construction and commissioning ==
The contract to build Hawkbill was awarded to the Mare Island Division of San Francisco Bay Naval Shipyard in Vallejo, California, on 18 December 1964, and her keel was laid down there on 12 September 1966. She was launched on 12 April 1969, sponsored by Mrs. Bernard F. Roeder, the wife of Vice Admiral Bernard F. Roeder, Commander, United States First Fleet, and commissioned on 4 February 1971.

== Service history ==
In 1982, Hawkbill completed a scheduled overhaul of her reactor core at Puget Sound Naval Shipyard at Bremerton, Washington, with her crew berthed at Naval Submarine Base Bangor at Bangor. After sea trials and sound trials and port visits to Nanaimo, British Columbia, Canada; Alameda, California; and San Diego, California, Hawkbill returned to Pearl Harbor, Hawaii, commanded by Fred Crawford, where she joined Submarine Squadron One.

In 1983, Hawkbill made a western Pacific cruise, under the command of George Roletter, with stops at Yokosuka, Japan; Subic Bay, the Philippines; and Hong Kong.

Hawkbill made a dependent cruise from Lahaina, Maui, Hawaii, to her home port in Pearl Harbor. In early 1984, she deployed to the Arctic, undertaking an 87-day excursion under the polar ice cap, which included visits to Chinhae, South Korea; and Guam. Hawkbill earned two Battle Efficiency "E" awards from Submarine Squadron One during this period.

Hawkbill was decommissioned on 15 March 2000, the last of the "short-hull" Sturgeon-class attack submarines to be decommissioned, and that same day both was stricken from the Naval Vessel Register and entered the Ship and Submarine Recycling Program at Puget Sound Naval Shipyard for scrapping. Her scrapping was completed on 1 December 2000.

== Commemoration ==
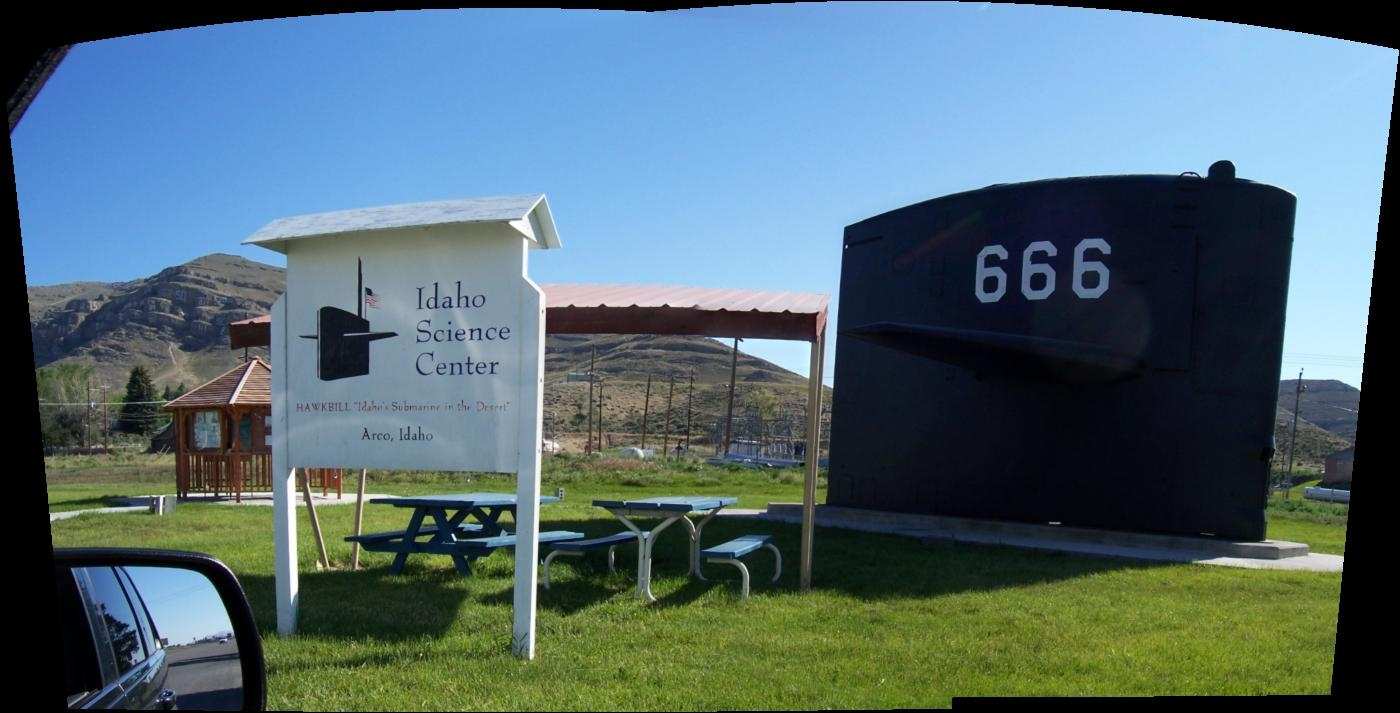
Sail of SSN-666 on display in Arco, Idaho

Hawkbill's sail was preserved and is exhibited in the Idaho Science Center in Arco, Idaho.
