= USS Providence (CL-82) =

United States Navy ship

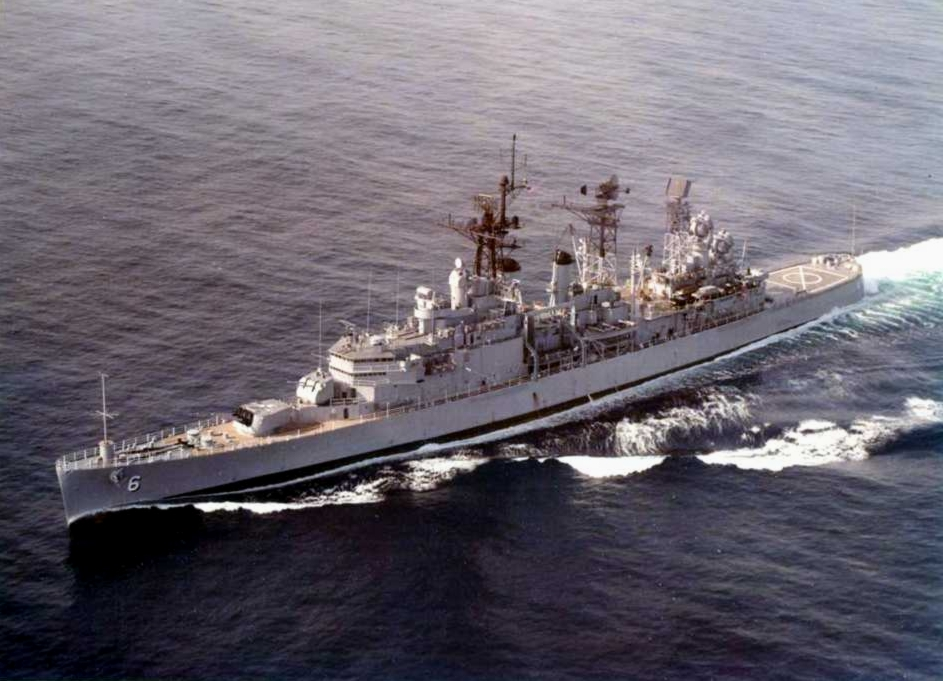
- USS Providence (CLG-6) underway in 1970

History

United States
- Name: Providence
- Namesake: City of Providence, Rhode Island
- Builder: Bethlehem Shipbuilding Corporation's Fore River Shipyard, Quincy, Massachusetts
- Laid down: 27 July 1943
- Launched: 28 December 1944
- Sponsored by: Mrs. Mary Roberts
- Commissioned: 15 May 1945
- Decommissioned: 14 June 1949
- Reclassified: CLG-6 on 23 May 1957; CG-6 on 1 July 1975
- Refit: 1957–1959
- Recommissioned: 17 September 1959
- Decommissioned: 31 August 1973
- Stricken: 30 September 1978
- Identification: Hull symbol:CL-82; Hull symbol:CLG-6; Hull symbol:CG-6; Code letters:NUKL
- Fate: Sold for scrapping, 15 July 1980
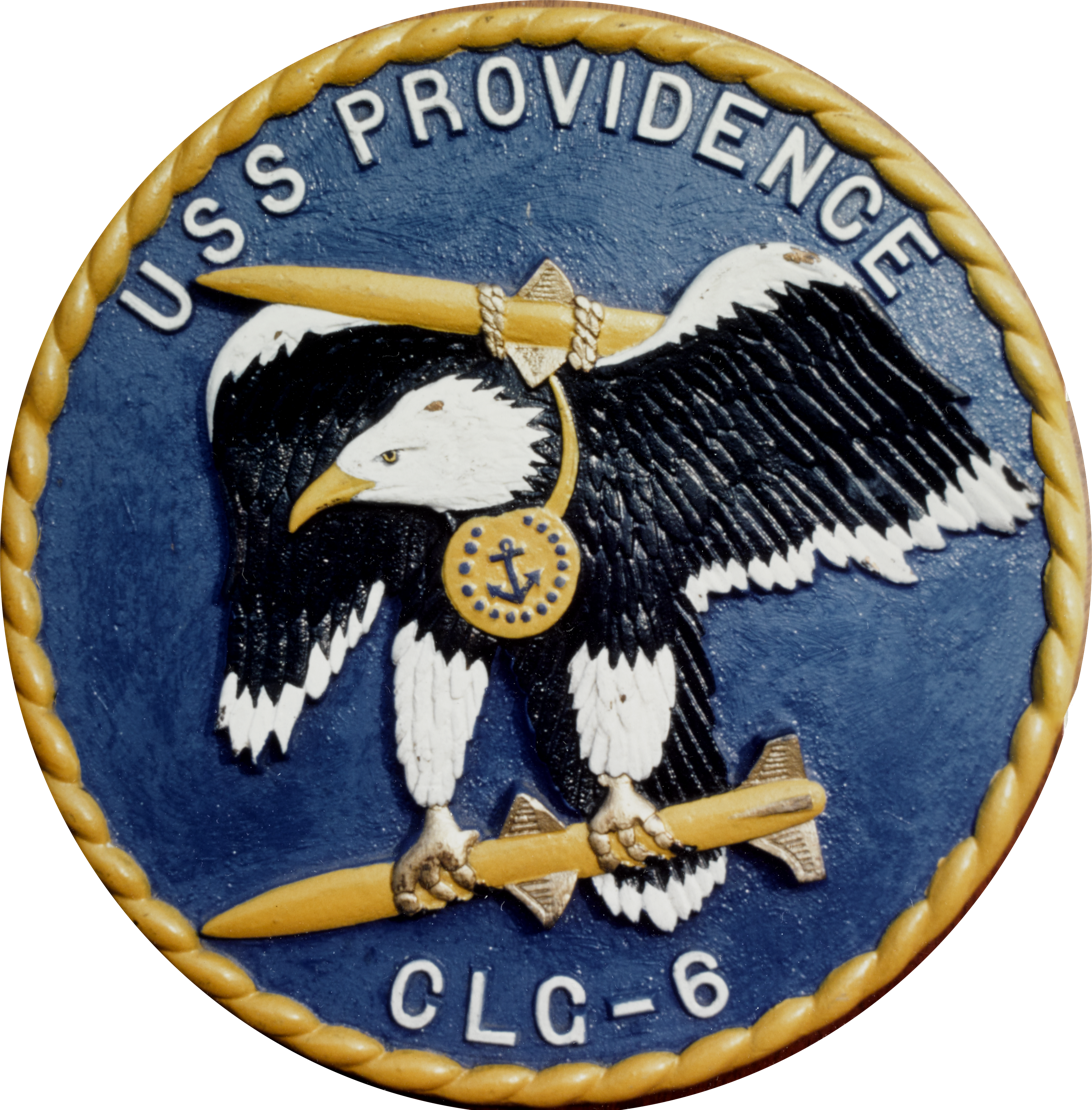
- Badge

General characteristics (as built)
- Class & type: Cleveland-class Light cruiser
- Displacement: 11,744 long tons (11,932 t) (standard); 14,131 long tons (14,358 t) (max)
- Length: 610 ft 1 in (185.95 m) oa; 608 ft (185 m)pp
- Beam: 66 ft 4 in (20.22 m)
- Draft: 25 ft 6 in (7.77 m) (mean); 25 ft (7.6 m) (max)
- Installed power: 4 × 634 psi Steam boilers; 100,000 shp (75,000 kW)
- Propulsion: 4 × geared turbines; 4 × screws
- Speed: 32.5 kn (37.4 mph; 60.2 km/h)
- Range: 11,000 nmi (20,000 km) @ 15 kn (17 mph; 28 km/h)
- Complement: 1,255 officers and enlisted
- Armament: 4 × triple 6 in (150 mm)/47 caliber Mark 16 guns; 6 × dual 5 in (130 mm)/38 caliber anti-aircraft guns; 4 × quad 40 mm (1.6 in) Bofors anti-aircraft guns; 6 × dual 40 mm (1.6 in) Bofors anti-aircraft guns; 10 × single 20 mm (0.79 in) Oerlikon anti-aircraft cannons
- Armor: Belt: 3 1/2–5 in (89–127 mm); Deck: 2 in (51 mm); Barbettes: 6 in (150 mm); Turrets: 1 1/2–6 in (38–152 mm); Conning Tower: 2 1/4–5 in (57–127 mm)
- Aircraft carried: 4 × floatplanes
- Aviation facilities: 2 × stern catapults

General characteristics (1959 rebuild)
- Class & type: Providence-class guided missile cruiser
- Displacement: 15,025 long tons (15,266 t)
- Armament: 1 × triple 6 in (150 mm)/47 caliber Mark 16 guns; 1 × dual 5 in (130 mm)/38 caliber anti-aircraft guns; 1 × twin-rail Mark 9 RIM-2 Terrier missile launcher

USS Providence (hull numbers: CL-82/CLG-6/CG-6) was a Cleveland-class light cruiser and the fourth ship of the United States Navy to be named after the city of Providence, Rhode Island. Providence was commissioned between 1945 and 1949. From 1957 to 1959, she was converted to a guided missile cruiser and flagship. She served in that role from 1959 to 1973. After her decommissioning, she was finally scrapped in 1980.

== Construction and commissioning ==
She was laid down 27 July 1943 by Bethlehem Steel Co., Quincy, Mass.; launched 28 December 1944; sponsored by Mrs. Mary Roberts; and commissioned 15 May 1945. Departing Boston 13 June 1945, Providence completed shakedown out of Guantanamo Bay, Cuba. Upon arrival at Newport, R.I., 4 September, she trained prospective cruiser and carrier crews until 6 October.

== Service ==
=== 1940s ===
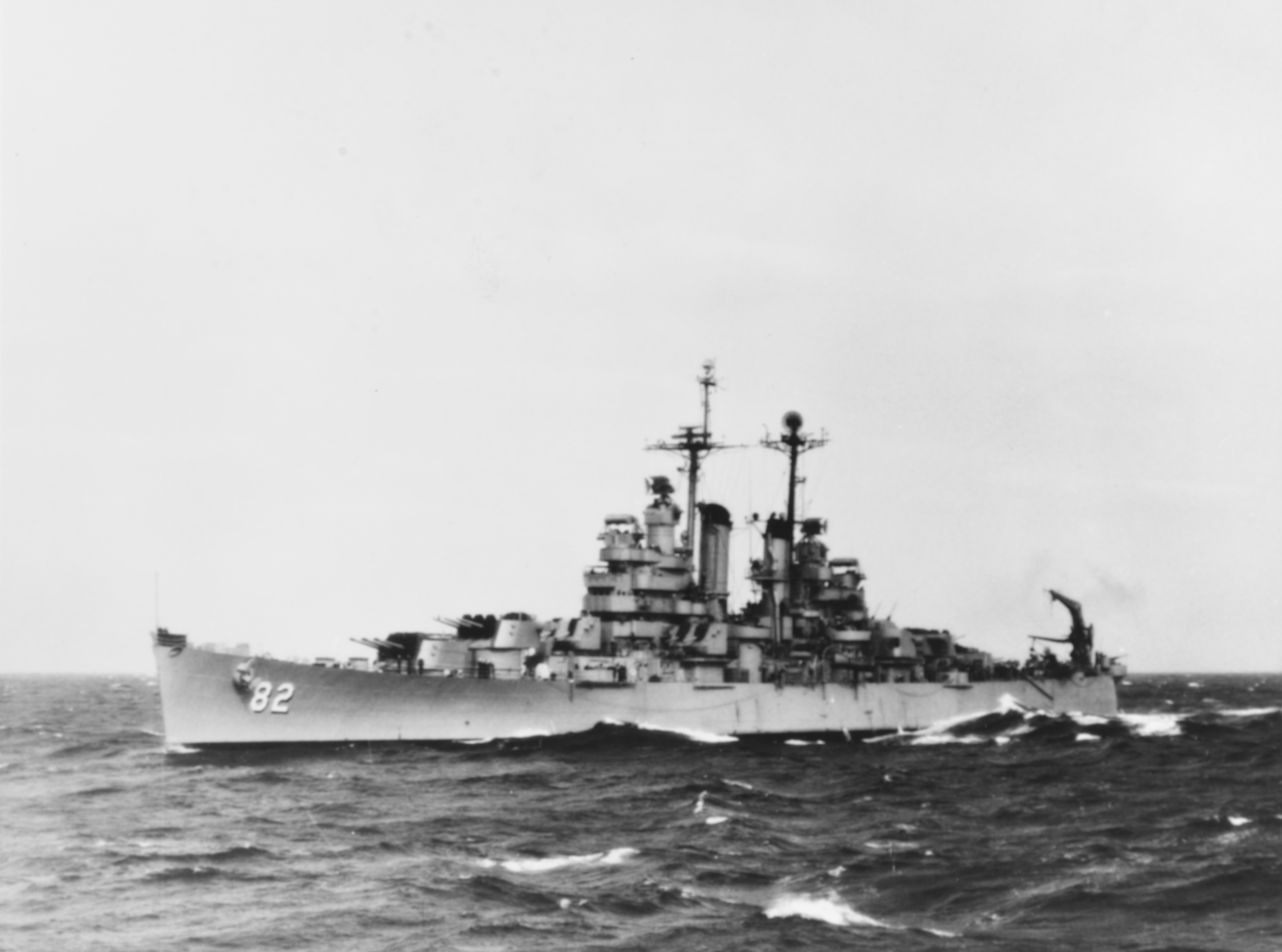
Providence (CL-82) as a gun cruiser in the late 1940s.

Departing Boston in November 1945, she visited Piraeus, Greece, on 6 December, making the first cruise intended to expand American prestige through naval visits lasting until 1947. Then, Istanbul with USS Missouri from 5 to 9 April 1946, and Alexandria, Egypt, in May, where she ran aground. Leaving the Mediterranean 16 June, she arrived at Philadelphia on the 25th. Following departure from the Delaware Capes in October and training out of Guantanamo Bay and Norfolk, Va., she left Hampton Roads for the Mediterranean 3 February 1947. After exercises and port visits in the Mediterranean, she departed Athens, Greece, in May, and arrived at Boston later that month.

Departing Newport, R.I., in November, she operated in the Mediterranean from 20 November 1947 to 2 March 1948, visiting Naples in December, Taranto in January, and Trieste and Venice in February, returning to Newport in March. Sailing from Newport in September 1948, she served the 6th Fleet in the Mediterranean from 23 September 1948 to 14 January 1949, visiting Thessaloniki in October, Marseille in November, Trieste and Venice in December, and Oran in January, returning to Newport later in January. She decommissioned at Boston 14 June 1949, and entered the Atlantic Reserve Fleet.

=== 1950s ===
Reclassified CLG–6 on 23 May 1957, she commenced conversion to a Providence-class guided missile light cruiser at Boston in June 1957. Provided with RIM-2 Terrier missiles, command ship facilities, and a nuclear weapons capability, she recommissioned 17 September 1959, Captain Kenneth L. Veth in command. As a missile cruiser, she retained the #1 6-inch gun turret. The #2 turret was replaced with a dual 5"/38 caliber mount; the aft armament was wholly replaced by missiles and the after side of the superstructure completely rebuilt.

=== 1960s ===
Following shakedown out of Guantanamo Bay, Providence arrived at her new home port of Long Beach, California, 29 July 1960. After a six-month tour of duty with the 7th Fleet, she returned to Long Beach 31 March 1961. She appeared as the fictional U.S.S Almira in the motion picture "The Honeymoon Machine" (1961) using stock footage taken of her at anchor in harbor. Following exercises off the West Coast, she arrived at Yokosuka, Japan, in May 1962, and relieved Oklahoma City as flagship of the 7th Fleet. During 1962 and 1963 she participated in 7th Fleet exercises. During a three-day visit to Saigon in January 1964, she hosted South Vietnamese and American dignitaries, and delivered more than 38 tons of "Project Handclasp" materials to local humanitarian organizations. Departing Yokosuka in July 1964, she returned to Long Beach in August. In October 1964 she began exercises in the Eastern Pacific. During January to June 1965, she received modern communications equipment. Spending the remainder of 1965 off the West Coast with the 1st Fleet, she participated in exercises and visited various West Coast ports.

Deployed to WestPac 12 November 1966, she again relieved Oklahoma City (CLG–5) as flagship of the 7th Fleet on 1 December 1966 at Yokosuka, Japan. She contributed to a major bombardment of enemy positions in Vietnam 1 April 1967. She duelled with an enemy shore battery off the DMZ on 25 May. In July she provided gunfire support for amphibious operations. She bombarded enemy storage areas south of Da Nang 10 October.

During 1968, she provided gunfire support off Vietnam during each month except June and December. In February 1968 Providence was involved in the Tết Offensive. She contributed by shelling the wall around "The Citadel" in Huế, during the Battle of Hue. After this, as part of Operation Formation Star, Providence along with three carrier groups headed for the Sea of Japan as the USS Pueblo was captured by North Korea.

Providence received her first Navy Unit Commendation for service during the period of 25 November 1966 to 8 November 1968. During 1969 she operated with the 1st Fleet off the West Coast.

=== 1970s ===
Providence left San Diego to provide naval gunfire support off the coast of Vietnam from April to December 1972. For her service in Vietnam, she received her second Navy Unit Commendation in 1973:

"The Secretary of the Navy takes pleasure in presenting the Navy Unit Commendation to USS Providence (CLG-6) for service as set forth in the following citation:
For exceptionally meritorious service from 20 April 1972 to 1 December 1972 while participating in combat operations off the coast of North and South Vietnam. In her primary role of providing naval gunfire support to allied forces in Vietnam, USS Providence inflicted serious losses on the enemy. Her outstanding support of South Vietnamese forces played a significant role in containing the North Vietnamese invasion. During the South Vietnamese counteroffensive, Providence time and again provided the firepower when and where it was needed by the forces ashore. Providence was also called upon on numerous occasions to participate in operations to interdict the flow of supplies in North Vietnam. She accomplished this mission with daring and skill, often coming under intense hostile fire. Providence took part in the first multi-cruiser strike since World War II. This daring and successful raid on military targets in the Haiphong harbor area demonstrated superior teamwork and professionalism by the officers and men of USS Providence. Their sustained superior performance reflected great credit upon themselves, their ship, and the United States Naval Service.
John W. Warner, Secretary of the Navy, 14 May 1973".

== Decommissioning ==
Providence was decommissioned on 31 August 1973. She was stricken on 30 September 1978 and sold to National Steel Corp., Terminal Island, CA Sale # 160018 on 15 July 1980, removed from custody 31 July 1980 and scrapped.

== Awards ==
Combat Action Ribbon
Navy Unit Commendation with one bronze star (two awards)
American Campaign Medal
World War II Victory Medal
Navy Occupation Medal with "EUROPE" clasp
National Defense Service Medal
Armed Forces Expeditionary Medal with one bronze star
Vietnam Service Medal with 6 campaign stars (one silver and one bronze)
Vietnam Navy Gallantry Cross with Palm device
Vietnam Campaign Medal
