= USS Mahoning County =

1944 LST-542-class tank landing ship

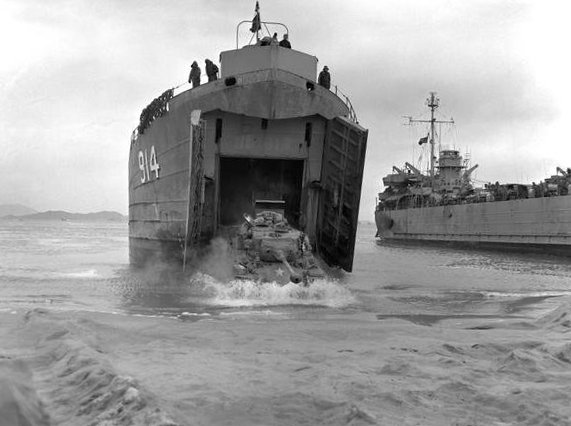
- A General Patton tank (M46) leaving through the bow doors of USS LST-914 during the invasion of Wonsan, Korea, 2 November 1950.

History

United States
- Name: LST-914
- Builder: Bethlehem-Hingham Shipyard, Hingham, Massachusetts
- Yard number: 3384
- Laid down: 16 February 1944
- Launched: 18 April 1944
- Commissioned: 18 May 1944
- Decommissioned: 26 June 1946
- Stricken: 26 June 1946
- Identification: Hull symbol: LST-914; Code letters: NVPU
- Honors and awards: 2 × battle stars
- Fate: Loaned to the US Army; Reacquired by USN, 26 August 1950

United States
- Name: LST-914 (1950–1955); Mahoning County (1955–1959)
- Namesake: Mahoning County, Ohio
- Acquired: 26 August 1950
- Recommissioned: 26 August 1950
- Decommissioned: 5 September 1959
- Renamed: Mahoning County, 1 July 1955
- Honors and awards: 3 × battle stars
- Fate: Sold for scrapping, 22 June 1960

General characteristics
- Class & type: LST-542-class tank landing ship
- Displacement: 1,625 long tons (1,651 t) (light); 4,080 long tons (4,145 t) (full (seagoing draft with 1,675 short tons (1,520 t) load); 2,366 long tons (2,404 t) (beaching)
- Length: 328 ft (100 m) oa
- Beam: 50 ft (15 m)
- Draft: Unloaded: 2 ft 4 in (0.71 m) forward; 7 ft 6 in (2.29 m) aft; Full load: 8 ft 3 in (2.51 m) forward; 14 ft 1 in (4.29 m) aft; Landing with 500 short tons (450 t) load: 3 ft 11 in (1.19 m) forward; 9 ft 10 in (3.00 m) aft; Limiting 11 ft 2 in (3.40 m); Maximum navigation 14 ft 1 in (4.29 m)
- Installed power: 2 × 900 hp (670 kW) Electro-Motive Diesel 12-567A diesel engines; 1,800 shp (1,300 kW)
- Propulsion: 1 × Falk main reduction gears; 2 × Propellers
- Speed: 11.6 kn (21.5 km/h; 13.3 mph)
- Range: 24,000 nmi (44,000 km; 28,000 mi) at 9 kn (17 km/h; 10 mph) while displacing 3,960 long tons (4,024 t)
- Boats & landing craft carried: 2 x LCVPs
- Capacity: 1,600–1,900 short tons (3,200,000–3,800,000 lb; 1,500,000–1,700,000 kg) cargo depending on mission
- Troops: 16 officers, 147 enlisted men
- Complement: 13 officers, 104 enlisted men
- Armament: Varied, ultimate armament; 2 × twin 40 mm (1.57 in) Bofors guns; 4 × single 40 mm Bofors guns; 12 × 20 mm (0.79 in) Oerlikon cannons

Service record
- Part of: LST Flotilla 36
- Operations: World War II; Invasion of southern France (15 August–21 September 1944); Assault and occupation of Okinawa Gunto (8 May–30 June 1945); Korean War; North Korean Aggression (18 September–2 November 1950); Communist China Aggression (3 November 1950–24 January 1951); Inchon Landing (15–17 September 1950); First UN Counter Offensive (25 May–1 April 1951); Second Korean Winter (20 March–30 April 1952); Korean Defense Summer-Fall 1952 (1–4 May, 5–19 July 1952)
- Awards: World War II; Navy Unit Commendation; American Campaign Medal; European–African–Middle Eastern Campaign Medal; Asiatic–Pacific Campaign Medal; World War II Victory Medal; Philippine Liberation Medal; Korean War; National Defense Service Medal; Korean Service Medal; United Nations Korea Medal; Korean War Service Medal

USS Mahoning County (LST-914) was an LST-542-class tank landing ship built for the United States Navy during World War II. Like many of her class, she was not named and is properly referred to by her hull designation. She was later named after Mahoning County, Ohio, she was the only US Naval vessel to bear the name.

== Construction ==
LST-914 was laid down 16 February 1944, at Hingham, Massachusetts, by the Bethlehem-Hingham Shipyard; launched 18 April 1944; and commissioned 18 May 1944.

== World War II ==
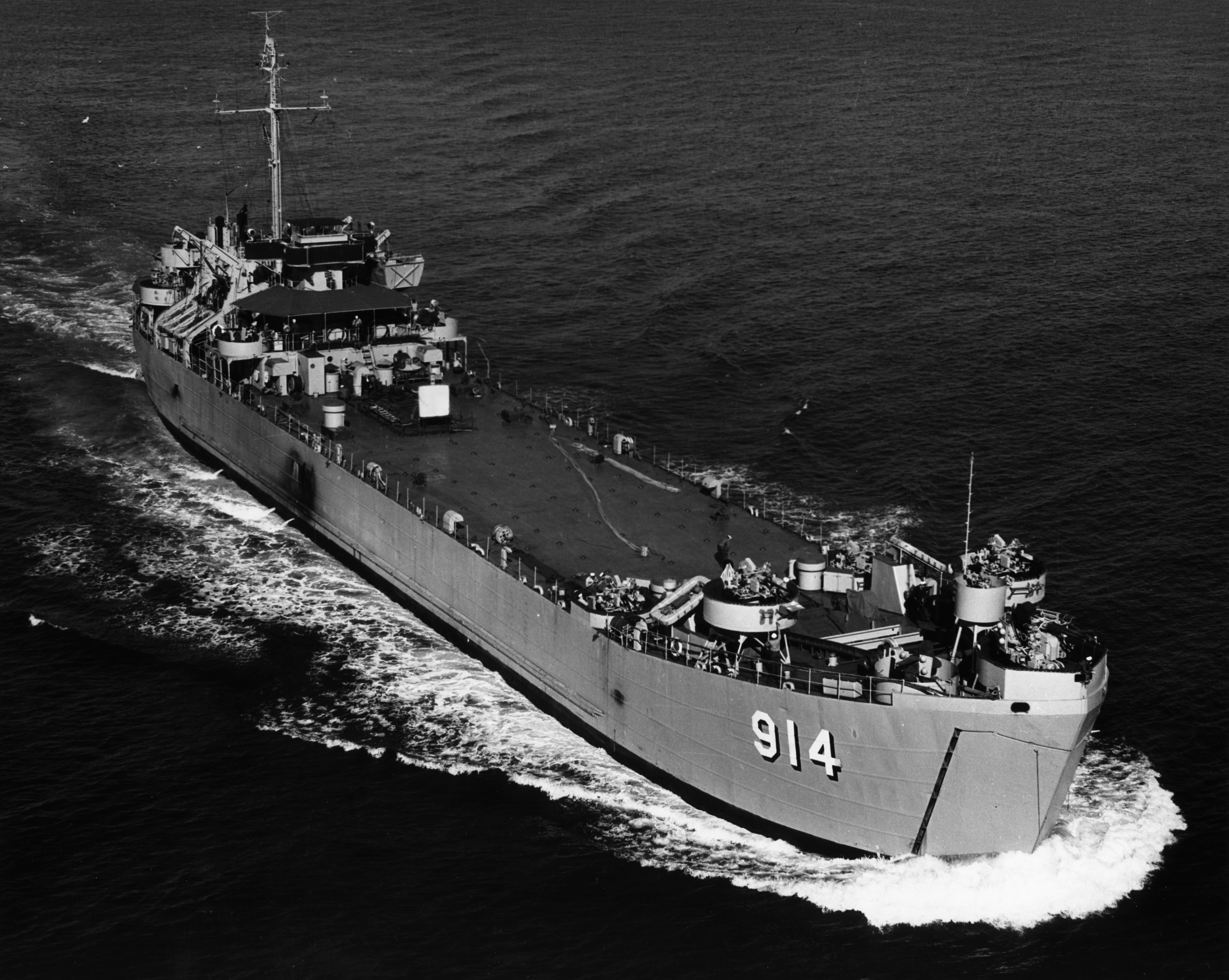
LST-914 under way

LST‑914 first engaged in combat duty with the invasion of southern France 15 August 1944. She carried US Army troops and equipment from Naples, Italy, and unloaded them on the beach of Cogolin. Shortly afterward the LST joined Training Group Command, Atlantic Fleet, and operated along the east and gulf coasts until early in 1945. On 10 February 1945, she departed Gulfport, Mississippi, for the Canal Zone en route to duty with the Pacific Fleet. Steaming via Pearl Harbor and Eniwetok, she arrived Saipan 25 April. For the next four months the ship carried men and equipment between Saipan and Okinawa, making occasional calls at Tinian and Guam. She departed Saipan 24 July, and sailed for the Philippines, operating there for the remainder of the War.

LST‑914 continued to operate in the Western Pacific after the Japanese surrender. On 26 June 1946, she decommissioned and was lent to the US Army. She was then given a Japanese crew and for the next four years transported general cargo in the Far East.

== Korean War ==
With the outbreak of hostilities in Korea and the consequent urgent need for ships, LST‑914 recommissioned at Yokosuka, Japan, 26 August 1950. By 6 September, she was steaming for the combat zone. She embarked units of the 1st Marine Division at Pusan and transported them around the peninsula for the 15 September, Inchon invasion, one of the decisive amphibious assaults of history, which routed the North Korean Army. Following Inchon, for which her task element was awarded the Navy Unit Commendation, the LST participated in the Wonsan operations and in the evacuation of Hungnam, 10–24 December. On 13 January, she sailed for Kobe, Japan, underwent overhaul and returned to Korea in mid‑February. She continued to support operations off the Korean coast until 1 April 1951, then departed for San Diego, arriving 26 May.

== Post-War duty ==
For the next 2 years LST‑914 operated off the West coast. In June 1953, she departed San Diego for her first Bar‑Change operation, the replenishment of bases in the Arctic. She returned to that duty during the summers of 1955‑1957, and plied the waters of the Arctic Ocean, operating primarily in the Beaufort Sea. En route to her 1955 Arctic deployment, LST‑914 was given the name Mahoning County in ceremonies at Seattle, Washington, 7 July. Among the sailors on board was Fireman Richard G. Adams of Struthers, Ohio, a city in Mahoning County. In addition to her Arctic cruises, the LST also participated in deployments in the western Pacific during the winters of 1954, 1956, and 1958.

In 1958, Mahoning County was awarded the Marjorie Sterrett Battleship Fund Award, which is presented annually by the US Navy's Chief of Naval Operations to the fleet's most battle-ready ship.

Mahoning County operated out of Long Beach for the first 9 months of 1959. On 5 September she decommissioned and was sold to Zidall Explorations, Inc. of Portland, Oregon on 22 June 1960 for scrapping.

== Awards ==
LST‑914 received two battle stars for World War II service and six for Korean War service.

== Bibliography ==
Online resources

- "LST-914". Dictionary of American Naval Fighting Ships. Naval History and Heritage Command. This article incorporates text from this source, which is in the public domain.
- "Mahoning County". Dictionary of American Naval Fighting Ships. Naval History and Heritage Command. 5 August 2015. This article incorporates text from this source, which is in the public domain.
- "Bethlehem-Hingham, Hingham MA". ShipbuildingHistory.com. 11 August 2011.
- "USS Mahoning (LST-914)". NavSource. 16 December 2016.
