= USS Finback (SSN-670) =

Submarine of the United States

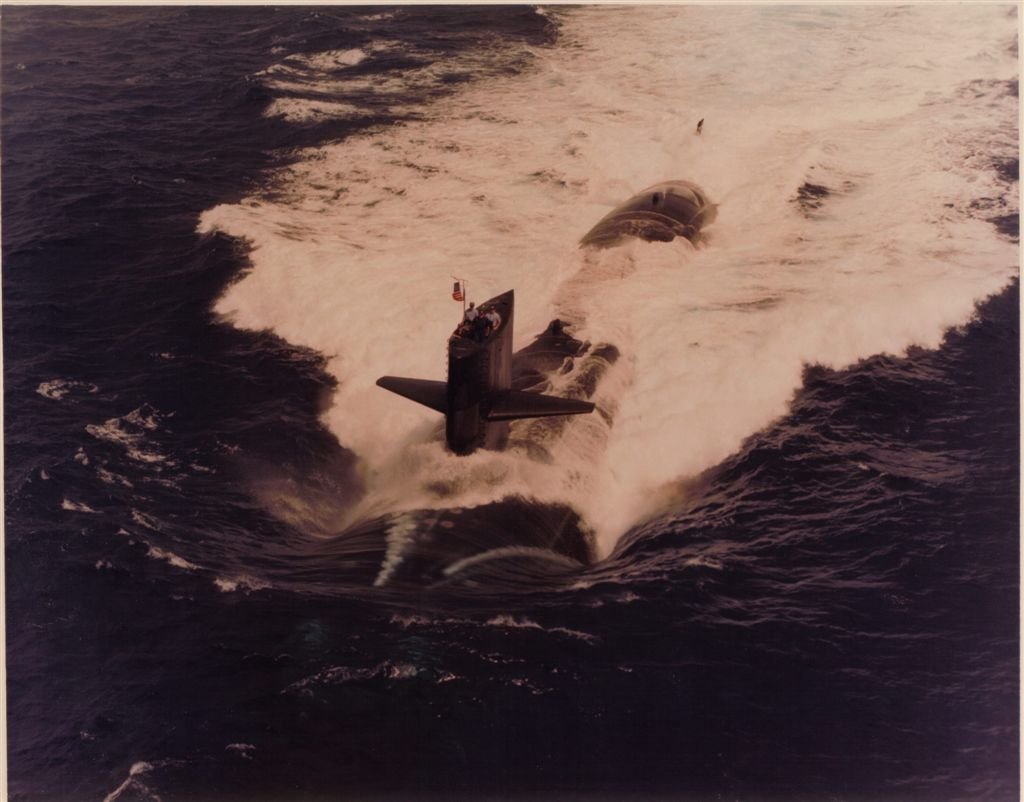
- USS Finback (SSN-670) off Norfolk, Virginia, probably during sea trials in 1969-1970.

History

United States
- Name: USS Finback (SSN-670)
- Namesake: The finback, a whale
- Ordered: 9 March 1965
- Builder: Newport News Shipbuilding and Dry Dock Company, Newport News, Virginia
- Laid down: 26 June 1967
- Launched: 7 December 1968
- Sponsored by: Mrs. Charles F. Bird
- Commissioned: 4 February 1970
- Decommissioned: 28 March 1997
- Stricken: 28 March 1997
- Motto: All Good Men
- Honors and awards: Marjorie Sterrett Battleship Fund Award for U.S. Atlantic Fleet 1986
- Fate: Scrapping via Ship and Submarine Recycling Program completed 30 October 1997
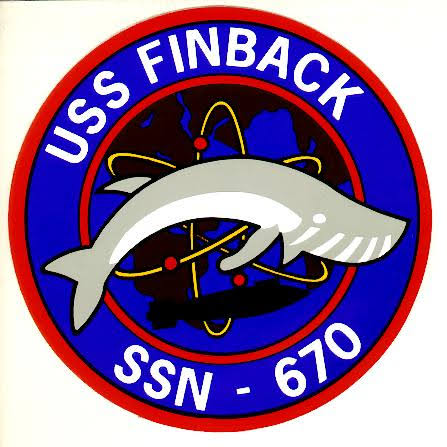
- Badge

General characteristics
- Class & type: Sturgeon-class attack submarine
- Displacement: 4,001 long tons (4,065 t) light; 4,292 long tons (4,361 t) full; 291 long tons (296 t) dead
- Length: 292 ft (89 m)
- Beam: 32 ft (9.8 m)
- Draft: 29 ft (8.8 m)
- Installed power: 15,000 shaft horsepower (11.2 megawatts)
- Propulsion: One S5W nuclear reactor, two steam turbines, one screw
- Speed: 15 knots (28 km/h; 17 mph) surfaced; 25 knots (46 km/h; 29 mph) submerged
- Test depth: 1,300 feet (396 meters)
- Complement: 109 (14 officers, 95 enlisted men)
- Armament: 4 × 21-inch (533 mm) torpedo tubes

USS Finback (SSN-670), a Sturgeon-class attack submarine, was the second ship of the United States Navy to be named for the finback, the common whale of the Atlantic coast of the United States.

== Construction and commissioning ==
The contract to build Finback was awarded to Newport News Shipbuilding and Dry Dock Company in Newport News, Virginia, on 9 March 1965 and her keel was laid down there on 26 June 1967. She was launched on 7 December 1968, sponsored by Mrs. Charles F. Baird, wife of the Under Secretary of the Navy, and commissioned on 4 February 1970.

== Service history ==
=== Topless dancer incident ===
On 10 July 1975, Finback's commanding officer, (a commander with the courtesy title of "captain"), permitted a topless dancer to perform on the diving plane of the sail as the vessel departed Port Canaveral, Florida. The captain had given permission for the act as a reward for performance by his crew during a major overhaul at the Naval shipyard in Portsmouth, Virginia, the preceding year which cut two months off of a scheduled 12-month overhaul at considerable savings to the government. On 1 August 1975, when Navy command learned of the incident, the submarine was ordered back to port and the captain was relieved of his command, "pending the investigation of an incident of a non-operational nature."

On 2 October 1975, Chief of Naval Operations Admiral James L. Holloway III found the captain of Finback "guilty of permitting an action, which could have distracted the attention of those responsible for the safe navigation of the nuclear-powered submarine maneuvering in restricted waters." Holloway agreed with subordinates that the captain had failed to exercise good judgement and did not follow the regulations governing civilian visitors to naval vessels. An article in the February 2010 issue of Naval History, published by the United States Naval Institute, Annapolis, Maryland, categorizes this episode as "one of the most notorious incidents in the history of the Navy's nuclear-powered submarine force."

=== Refueling Overhaul ===
In June 1978, the Finback entered Newport News shipyard for a scheduled refueling overhaul. The overhaul was completed in January 1981 and the Finback sailed to the Bahamas for testing and made port calls in Port Canaveral, Frederiksted, St Croix and St Maarten.

== Awards ==
In 1986, Finback won the Marjorie Sterrett Battleship Fund Award for the United States Atlantic Fleet.

== Decommissioning and disposal ==
Finback was decommissioned on 28 March 1997 and stricken from the Naval Vessel Register the same day. Her scrapping via the Nuclear-Powered Ship and Submarine Recycling Program at Puget Sound Naval Shipyard in Bremerton, Washington, was completed on 30 October 1997.
