= USS Flying Fish (SSN-673) =

Submarine of the United States

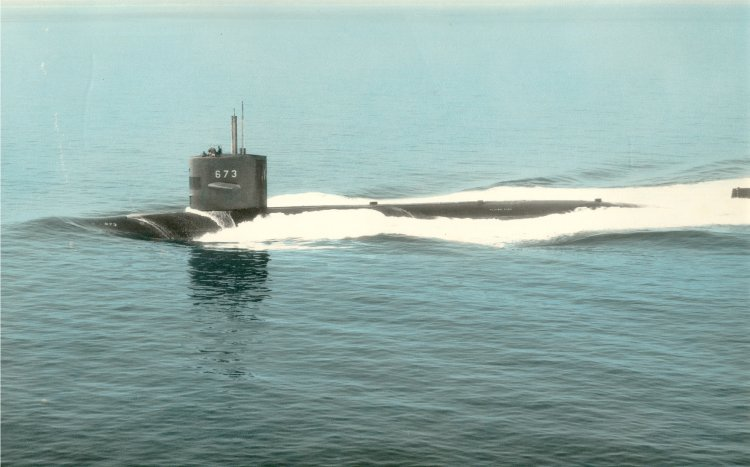
- USS Flying Fish (SSN-673) off Norfolk, Virginia, c. 1972–1973.

History

United States
- Name: USS Flying Fish
- Namesake: The flying fish
- Ordered: 15 July 1966
- Builder: Electric Boat Division of General Dynamics Corporation at Groton, Connecticut
- Laid down: 30 June 1967
- Launched: 17 May 1969
- Sponsored by: Mrs. John W. Harvey
- Commissioned: 29 April 1970
- Decommissioned: 16 May 1996
- Stricken: 16 May 1996
- Honors and awards: Marjorie Sterrett Battleship Fund Award for U.S. Atlantic Fleet 1976
- Fate: Scrapping via Ship and Submarine Recycling Program completed 15 October 1996

General characteristics
- Class & type: Sturgeon-class attack submarine
- Displacement: 3,978 long tons (4,042 t) light; 4,270 long tons (4,339 t) full; 292 long tons (297 t) dead
- Length: 292 ft 3 in (89.08 m)
- Beam: 31 ft 8 in (9.65 m)
- Draft: 28 ft 8 in (8.74 m)
- Installed power: 15,000 shaft horsepower (11.2 megawatts)
- Propulsion: One S5W nuclear reactor, two steam turbines, one screw
- Speed: 15 knots (28 km/h; 17 mph) surfaced; 25 knots (46 km/h; 29 mph) submerged
- Test depth: 1,300 feet (396 meters)
- Complement: 109 (14 officers, 95 enlisted men)
- Armament: 4 × 21-inch (533 mm) torpedo tubes

USS Flying Fish (SSN-673), a Sturgeon-class attack submarine, was the third ship of the United States Navy to be named for the flying fish, any of number of fishes whose long winglike fins make it possible for them to move some distance through the air.

== Construction and commissioning ==
The contract to build Flying Fish was awarded to the Electric Boat Division of General Dynamics Corporation in Groton, Connecticut, on 15 July 1966 and her keel was laid down there on 30 June 1967. She was launched on 17 May 1969, sponsored by Mrs. John W. Harvey, widow of the last commanding officer of USS THRESHER, and commissioned on 29 April 1970.

== Service history ==
- 6/30/1967 - Keel laid at Electric Boat (EB) in Groton, CT
- 5/17/1969 - Launched at EB Groton, Mrs. John W. Harvey was sponsor, widow of Thresher SSN-593 CO
- 4/1/1970 - Delivered to Navy
- 4/29/1970 - Commissioned at Groton, CO is CDR Donald C. Sheldon, Assigned to Subron 6 Norfolk
- 2/13/1973 - CDR James D. Williams relieved CDR Sheldon as CO
- 11/14/1973 - PNSY for extensive overhaul (Approx 1 year)
- 5/22/1976 - CDR Thomas A. Meinecke relieved CDR Williams as CO
- 4/10/1976 - Visits Bremerhaven, Germany 4–8 OCT
- In 1976, she won the Marjorie Sterrett Battleship Fund Award for the United States Atlantic Fleet.
- 4/29/1977 - Surfaced at North pole at midnight and remained there for 12 hours. She was 11th to visit and 10th to surface at the pole. Dr. Waldo Lyon aboard. CDR Thomas A. Meinecke is CO (SUBICEX1-77)
- 6/6/1977 - Returned to Norfolk from polar cruise. Entered Portsmouth Naval Shipyard for overhaul, late 1977.
- 12/1978 completed overhaul and deployed for sea trials. Once sea trials completed joined Subron 6 stationed at D&S Piers in Norfolk, VA.
- 4/1979 -6/79 - Completed torpedo range certification, Bahamas and visit Rosey Roads, Puerto Rico.
- 10/79-12/79 - Deployed to northern Atlantic for "Spec Op," awarded Navy Expeditionary Medal.
- 4/1980 USS Flying Fish awarded Battle Efficiency "E," for operations excellence.
- 7/8/1980 - CDR Steven J. Loucks relieved CDR T. A. Meinecke as CO, 7/1980 - Deployed to Mediterranean.
- 12/10/1980 - Returned to Norfolk after 5 months med deployment, visiting ports including Athens, Greece, Naples, Italy, La Spezia, Italy, and Ashdod, Israel
- 4/12/1981 - USS Flying Fish provided for Atlantic Ocean security for first Space Shuttle launch.
- 10/1981 - 12/1981 Deployed to northern Atlantic for "Spec Op," awarded Navy Expeditionary Medal, Meritorious Unit Commendation.
- 4/1/1983 - CDR Joseph T. Lario relieved CDR Steven J. Loucks as CO
- 6/30/1983 - In port, Port Everglades, FLA
- 7/23/1984 -Returned to Norfolk after 5 months med deployment, visiting La Spezia, Italy and Ashdod, Israel
- 6/10/1985 - Arrived New London for Refresher training
- 2/6/1986 - CDR Robert L. Hendricks relieved CDR. J.T. Lario as CO
- 7/15/1986 - Began overhaul at Puget Sound NSY
- 1/15/1988 - Completed overhaul at Puget sound NSY
- 11/5/1988 - Rejoined Subron 6 at Norfolk Naval Base after 2 1/2 years extended overhaul at PSNSY
- 4/3/1989 - CDR Stanley J Mack assumes command
- 3/5/1990 - Returned to Norfolk from 6 mo. Med Cruise
- 10/11/1991 - CDR Louis T Roumaya relieved CDR Stanley J Mack as CO at Naval station Norfolk
- 7/13/1993 (?) - Green Peace activists attempt to board the sub as a protest to nuclear power. 12 manage to climb aboard but are beaten back by the crew.
- 11/24/1993 - CDR Wiley Robert Deal Jr. assumes command
- 11/14/1994 - Returned to Norfolk from 4-month med and S. Atlantic cruise, visited Toulon, La Maddalena, Gibraltar. Roosevelt Roads, Curaçao and Bridgeport, Barbados

May 1995 Mine laying exercises, Joint Service Special Warfare operations - Operational Test Launch of Tomahawk cruise missile.

- 7/10/1995 - Inactivation at Norfolk
- 10/20/1995 - Placed "in reserve, in commission" from the active fleet for decommissioning. Recycling start date
- 5/16/1996 - Decommissioned at Puget Sound NSY, She had nine commanding Officers and steamed 600.000 miles. Strike date.
- 10/15/1996 - Recycling completed

== Decommissioning and disposal ==
Flying Fish was decommissioned on 16 May 1996 and stricken from the Naval Vessel Register the same day. Her scrapping via the Nuclear-Powered Ship and Submarine Recycling Program at Puget Sound Naval Shipyard in Bremerton, Washington, was completed on 15 October 1996.
