= USS Shadwell =

1944 Casa Grande-class dock landing ship

- USS Shadwell (LSD-15)

History

United States
- Name: USS Shadwell
- Namesake: Shadwell, Virginia
- Builder: Newport News Shipbuilding and Drydock Co., Newport News, Virginia
- Laid down: 17 January 1944
- Launched: 24 May 1944
- Commissioned: 24 July 1944
- Decommissioned: 10 July 1947
- Recommissioned: 20 September 1950
- Decommissioned: 9 March 1970
- Stricken: 1 November 1976
- Honors and awards: 1 battle star (World War II)
- Fate: Training ship from 1988 to 2017; Decommissioned and scrapped in situ, 2017

General characteristics
- Class & type: Casa Grande-class dock landing ship
- Displacement: 4,490 long tons (4,562 t)
- Length: 457 ft 9 in (139.52 m)
- Beam: 72 ft 2 in (22.00 m)
- Draft: 18 ft (5.5 m)
- Speed: 15.4 knots (28.5 km/h; 17.7 mph)
- Complement: 326
- Armament: 1 × 5 in (130 mm) gun; 10 × 40 mm guns (2×4, 1×2)

USS Shadwell (LSD-15) was a Casa Grande-class dock landing ship in the United States Navy. She was named after Shadwell plantation, Albemarle County, Virginia, the birthplace and early home of Thomas Jefferson, author of the Declaration of Independence and third President of the United States.

Initially authorized under the Lend-Lease Act and named Tomahawk, then renamed Waterway upon assignment to the United Kingdom, LSD-15 was reassigned back to the United States and named Shadwell. She was laid down on 17 January 1944 by the Newport News Shipbuilding and Drydock Co., at Newport News, Virginia; launched on 24 May 1944; sponsored by Miss Mary Greenman; and commissioned on 24 July 1944.

== Service history ==
=== World War II ===
After shakedown, Shadwell sailed from Hampton Roads on 26 August 1944. She transited the Panama Canal on 1 September and headed for San Diego, where she laid over for a docking period. After almost a month at San Diego, she departed on 2 October to join the Pacific Fleet. Upon arrival, Shadwell was employed in the transportation of heavy amphibious equipment between the islands of the southern Pacific. During this time, she visited Tulagi and Guadalcanal in the Solomons, Espiritu Santo on the New Hebrides, Manus in the Admiralty Islands, and Hollandia and Aitape on New Guinea.

On 28 December 1944, Shadwell embarked elements of the 1060th Engineer Battalion, United States Army, and sailed from New Guinea with Task Force 78 (TF 78). Though her convoy came under continual submarine, surface, and air attack, so efficient were the screening units that Shadwell's guns remained silent throughout the entire voyage to Lingayen Gulf, Luzon, P.I. However, on 9 January 1945 (D-Day for the Luzon invasion), Shadwell's gunners proved their worth by splashing an A6M Zero. Shadwell returned immediately to the staging area at Hollandia, New Guinea, embarked additional troops of the 1060th Army Engineers, then departed for Leyte, P.I. At Leyte, she joined Task Group 78.8 (TG 78.8), which soon made for Lingayen.

On the evening of 24 January 1945, the task group was sailing south of Siquijor Island, in the Philippines, when it was attacked by three torpedo bombers. Two were splashed by the convoy's combat air patrol, but the third escaped into the darkness. It soon returned, swooping down from the hills on the island, and pressed home its attack. The convoy's antiaircraft guns brought the enemy down, but not before he was able to release his torpedo. The air-dropped "fish" struck Shadwell just forward of amidships on the starboard side, tearing a hole in her bottom 60 feet (18 m) wide. The landing ship was taking water badly and soon began to sink. The convoy steamed on while two destroyers stood by to evacuate her crew if necessary. Shadwell's crew worked frantically to save their sinking ship and, by morning, their efforts were rewarded. Shadwell was steaming under her own power, steering for Leyte by trick wheel. Of the more than 500 men aboard Shadwell at the time, there were no fatalities and only three casualties, all only slightly injured.

Temporary repairs were made at Leyte and, when she was deemed seaworthy, Shadwell steamed on to Manus in the Admiralty Islands. There she went into drydock and underwent further temporary repairs before crossing the Pacific for permanent repairs. On 4 May, she reached Bremerton, Washington, and entered the Puget Sound Navy Yard. Just over two months later, she departed the yard to rejoin the fleet, sailing on 11 July. She stopped over at San Francisco on 14–15 July, fueled and took on ballast, then set course for Hawaii. On 23 July, she anchored in Maalaea Bay, off Maui and, the next day, shifted to Pearl Harbor. On the 28th, Shadwell set sail for the western Pacific, specifically Eniwetok Atoll in the Marshalls. She arrived there on 6 August and departed on the following day, bound for Samar in the Philippines. En route to Samar, she was diverted twice, first to Saipan, then to Guam, where she arrived on 13 August. Shadwell departed that same day to join the 3d Fleet and, on the 17th, two days after the cessation of hostilities, she joined TG 30.8. Ten days later, the landing ship arrived in Sagami Wan, off Tokyo Bay, and, two days thereafter, moored in the bay itself. Shadwell remained moored at Tokyo through May 1946, operating the boat pool there.

Returning to the United States in mid-1946, Shadwell underwent preinactivation overhaul and, on 10 July 1947, was placed out of commission, in reserve. She was berthed at Orange, Texas, as a unit of the Atlantic Reserve Fleet.

=== 1950–1970 ===
On 20 September 1950, Shadwell was recommissioned at Orange, Texas. She operated for the next five years in the western Atlantic and Caribbean. Ranging as far north as Labrador, Greenland, and Newfoundland, Shadwell participated in several Arctic Circle expeditions and exercises including "Bluejay" and "Convex" in 1951 and "Pinetree" in 1953. The remainder of her time was spent along the eastern seaboard and in the Caribbean.

On Friday, 4 February 1955 Customs Inspector George M. Bacon was killed when he tripped and fell aboard USS Shadwell, which was docked in Hampton Roads. The vessel had just returned from a tour of the Caribbean and had requested Customs clearance. Inspector Bacon fell approximately 20 feet (6.1 m) into the interior dock-well, resulting in significant trauma to his head. He was pronounced dead on the ship.

In 1956, after one Caribbean operation, Shadwell departed Norfolk for a tour of duty with the 6th Fleet in the Mediterranean. Thus she began a schedule of deployments, alternating Atlantic-Caribbean duty with cruises in the Mediterranean, which lasted until she was decommissioned in 1971.

Ten times, during the intervening 15 years, Shadwell cruised the "middle sea" and visited its ports of call. In 1959, Shadwell became the first helicopter-carrying dock landing ship (She had her call letters changed from LSD to LPH when she carried helicopters ). In 1961, she underwent a Fleet Rehabilitation and Modernization (FRAM) overhaul. She was in the Atlantic supporting the Cuban quarantine in October 1962. In February 1964, she participated in the amphibious exercise "Quick Kick V" on the coast of South Carolina. Seven months later, during the passage to her sixth Mediterranean deployment, Shadwell took part in Operation "Steel Pike" executed off the coast of Spain. In 1967, she won the Marjorie Sterrett Battleship Fund Award for the Atlantic Fleet. In January 1968, she was in the Caribbean engaged in Operation "Spring Board."

During August 1968, Shadwell departed the Mediterranean after a five-month deployment. She entered Little Creek, Virginia, on the 19th to begin inactivation overhaul.

In October 1968, Shadwell transported Marines to Vieques Island in the Caribbean and returned to CONUS. In December 1968, Shadwell transported Marines to Guantanamo Bay, Cuba and returned to CONUS.

On 8 July 1969, she was involved in a collision with USS Cambria during a night-time exercise off Malta.

On 9 March 1970, she was placed out of commission, in reserve. On 9 September, Shadwell was transferred to the James River, Virginia, group of the National Defense Reserve Fleet. Shadwell was struck from the Naval Vessel Register on 1 November 1976.

=== Mobile Bay ===
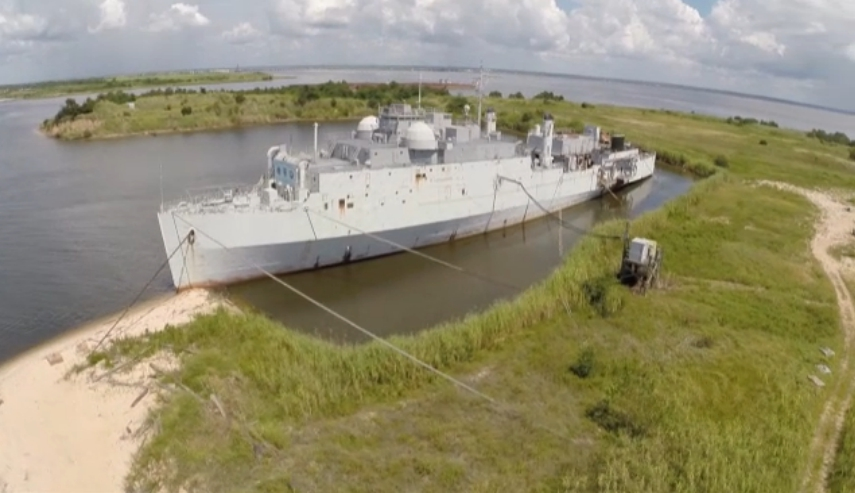
Shadwell in Mobile Bay, 2014.

On 10 November 1988, Shadwell, decommissioned and now known as ex-USS Shadwell, was transferred to the Fire Research Detachment, Little Sand Island, Mobile Bay, Alabama. She served as a test and training platform in the development of fire models and other damage and control systems.

Shadwell was grounded on Little Sand Island in Mobile Bay, Alabama, as a result of hurricanes Katrina and Rita. The ship was removed from the position of grounding in 2006. A U.S. Navy Mobile Diving and Salvage Unit (MDSU) assisted with the project.

In 2017, the ex-USS Shadwell was decommissioned as a fire test ship and later scrapped in place. All fire testing was shifted to land based facilities located at the Naval Research Laboratory's Chesapeake Bay Detachment in southern Maryland.

== Awards ==
Shadwell earned one battle star for World War II service. In 1967, she won the Marjorie Sterrett Battleship Fund Award for the Atlantic Fleet.
