= USS Lapon (SSN-661) =

Submarine of the United States

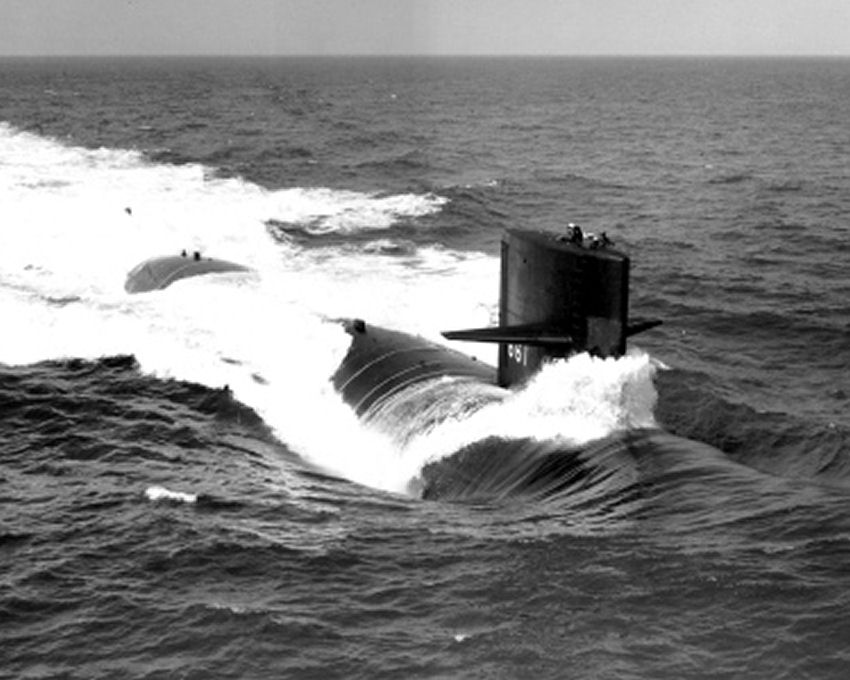
- USS Lapon (SSN-661) during her sea trials off Virginia in 1977.

History

United States
- Name: USS Lapon (SSN-661)
- Namesake: The lapon, a scorpionfish of the Pacific coast of North America
- Ordered: 24 October 1963
- Awarded: Navy Expeditionary Medal (Sub Specop) 1969
- Builder: Newport News Shipbuilding and Dry Dock Company, Newport News, Virginia
- Laid down: 26 July 1965
- Launched: 16 December 1966
- Sponsored by: Mrs. Charles D. Griffin
- Commissioned: 14 December 1967
- Decommissioned: 8 August 1992
- Stricken: 8 August 1992
- Motto: Secret et Hardi; ("Silent and Strong")
- Honors and awards: Meritorious Unit Commendation 1968; Meritorious Unit Commendation 1969; Presidential Unit Citation 1969; Navy Expeditionary Medal (Sub Specop); Submarine Division 62 Battle Efficiency Award (Battle "E") 1969; Marjorie Sterrett Battleship Fund Award for Operational Proficiency for the U.S. Atlantic Fleet 1970; Submarine Division 63 Battle "E" 1970; Navy Unit Commendation 1973; Meritorious Unit Commendation 1979; Submarine Squadron 6 Anti-submarine warfare (ASW)/Operations "A" 1979; Submarine Squadron 6 Engineering "E" 1979; Meritorious Unit Commendation 1982; Submarine Squadron 6 ASW/Operations "A" 1982; Meritorious Unit Commendation 1983; Navy Battle "E" 1983; Meritorious Unit Commendation 1985; Navy Battle "E" 1985; Arctic Expedition Ribbon (Ice Exercise (ICEX) 88) 1988; Navy Battle "E" 1991
- Fate: Scrapping via Ship and Submarine Recycling Program begun 1 March 2003, completed 31 August 2004

General characteristics
- Class & type: Sturgeon-class attack submarine
- Displacement: Surfaced : 4250 tons; Submerged : 4700 tons
- Length: 292 ft (89 m)
- Beam: 31.7 ft 8 in (9.87 m)
- Draft: 29.2 ft 8 in (9.10 m)
- Installed power: 15,000 shaft horsepower (11.2 megawatts)
- Propulsion: One S5W2 nuclear reactor, two steam turbines, one screw
- Speed: Surfaced: 15 knots; Submerged: 30 knots
- Test depth: 1,300 feet (396 meters)
- Complement: 107
- Armament: 4 × 21-inch (533 mm) torpedo tubes; Mark 48 ADCAP torpedoes

USS Lapon (SSN-661), a Sturgeon-class attack submarine, was the second ship of the United States Navy to be named for the lapon, a scorpionfish of the Pacific coast of North America.

== Construction and commissioning ==
The contract to build Lapon was awarded to Newport News Shipbuilding and Dry Dock Company in Newport News, Virginia, on 24 October 1963 and her keel was laid down there on 26 July 1965. She was launched on 16 December 1966, sponsored by Mrs. Charles D. Griffin, wife of Admiral Charles D. Griffin (1906–1996), and commissioned on 14 December 1967.

== Service history ==
Upon commissioning, Lapon reported to Commander, Submarine Force, United States Atlantic Fleet for duty, with her home port at Naval Station Norfolk in Norfolk, Virginia. The Lapon's crew successfully passed an Operational Readiness Review in early 1968 after completing training programs in SuBaseNLon. In the spring Lapon deployed on a SpecOp for which it received its first MUC. In late summer Lapon returned to NNS&DD Co for post shakedown availability. In 1969, Lapon participated in a training exercise before CNO, CinCLant and ComSubLant to demonstrate the feasibility of trailing another submarine. Following that exercise Lapon deployed on a second SpecOp and received a second MUC. Later in 1969, while under the command of Commander Chester "Whitey" Mack, Lapon successfully tailed a Soviet Navy Yankee class ballistic missile submarine for a period of forty-seven days. Lapon followed the Yankee for the Yankee's entire deterrent patrol and only broke contact when the Soviet submarine turned to go home. Lapon was awarded a Presidential Unit Citation for the feat and Mack became famous in the submarine community for this noteworthy success, personally receiving the Distinguished Service Medal.

Lapon was on routine deployment in the Mediterranean Sea when the Yom Kippur War broke out on 6 October 1973. Lapon had been scheduled to make a three-day liberty run from La Maddalena, Sardinia to Athens, Greece, but was instead deployed to the eastern Mediterranean where it monitored Soviet submarine activity, remaining at sea for 44 days. Returning to La Magdelena when food stores were so low the crew had begun eating different kinds of meals. Because of the hasty departure when the war broke out, there were only three movies aboard. Two were terrible, and shown only once. The third movie was the 1971 release "Dirty Harry" which was shown twice a day for the entire deployment. Lapon set a record for most Soviet submarines trailed during the period, and the crew was awarded the Navy Unit Commendation.

Honors and awards:

Meritorious Unit Commendation 1968

Meritorious Unit Commendation 1969

Presidential Unit Citation 1969

Navy Expeditionary Medal (Sub Specop)

Submarine Division 62 Battle Efficiency Award (Battle "E") 1969

Marjorie Sterrett Battleship Fund Award for Operational Proficiency for the U.S. Atlantic Fleet 1970

Submarine Division 63 Battle "E" 1970

Navy Unit Commendation 1973

Meritorious Unit Commendation 1979

Submarine Squadron 6 Anti-submarine warfare (ASW)/Operations "A" 1979

Submarine Squadron 6 Engineering "E" 1979

Meritorious Unit Commendation 1982

Submarine Squadron 6 ASW/Operations "A" 1982

Meritorious Unit Commendation 1983

Navy Battle "E" 1983

Meritorious Unit Commendation 1985

Navy Battle "E" 1985

Arctic Expedition Ribbon (Ice Exercise (ICEX) 88) 1988

Navy Battle "E" 1991

== Decommissioning and disposal ==
Deactivated on 1 October 1991 while still in commission, Lapon was decommissioned on 8 August 1992 at the Puget Sound Naval Shipyard at Bremerton, Washington, and stricken from the Naval Vessel Register the same day. Her scrapping via the Nuclear-Powered Ship and Submarine Recycling Program began on 1 March 2003 and was completed on 31 August 2004.

The sail was transported from Bremerton Washington to Springfield Missouri. Reassembly was in 2005 at Vietnam War Memorial Post 639 thanks to the work of Runner Base of USSVI. Most costs were donated by businesses and patriotic Americans. Five past commanders attended the dedication ceremony.

== Commemoration ==
Lapon's sail was preserved as a war memorial at American Legion Post 639 in Springfield, Missouri. It was dedicated on 3 July 2005. USS Lapon Association is an active group with bi-annual reunions.

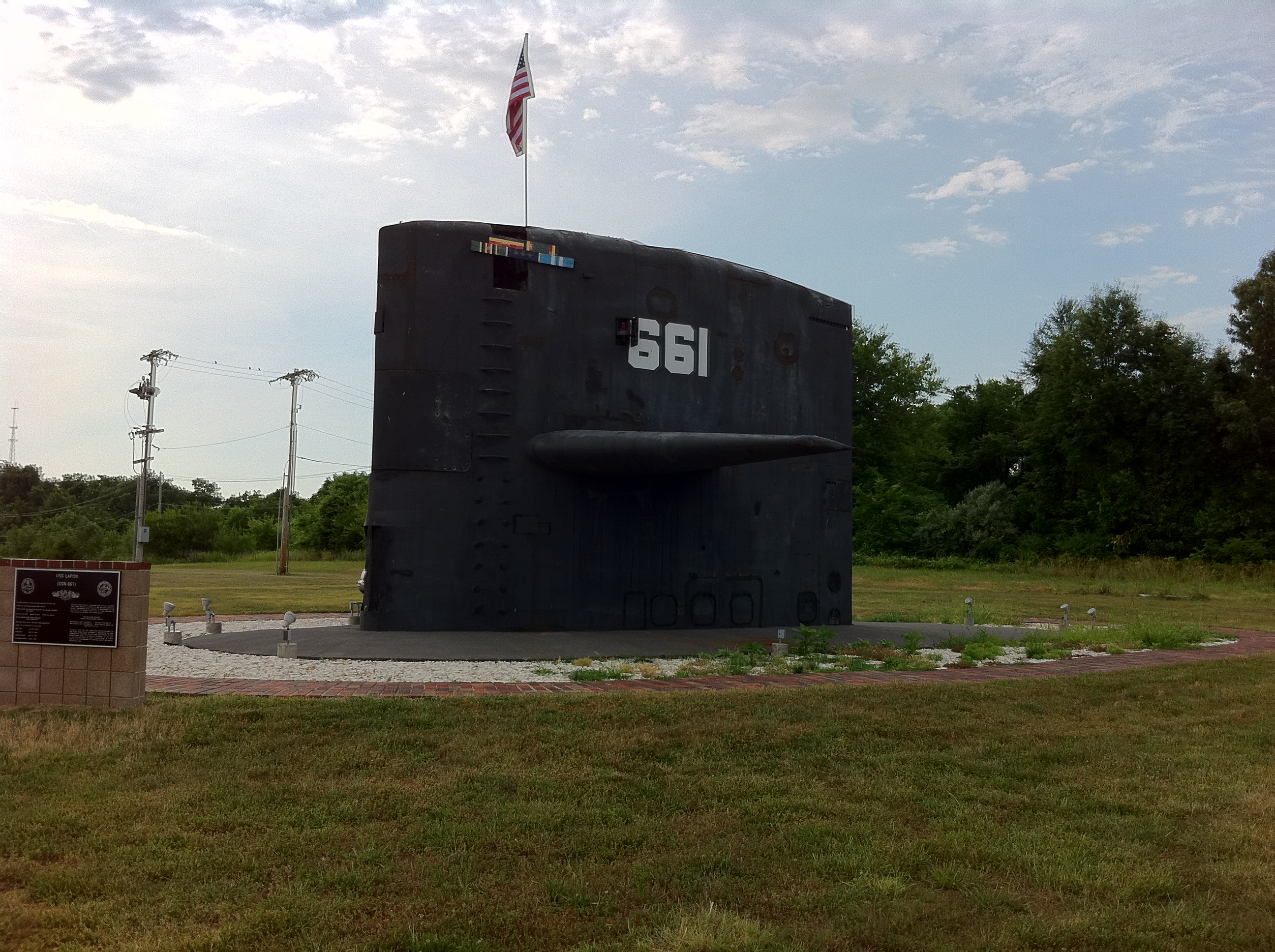
War Memorial at the American Legion Post 639

The song “Ballad of Whitey Mack” by Tommy Cox was written in honor of Lapon and her commanding officer, Chester Mack.

== Awards ==
- 1968, Meritorious Unit Commendation
- 1969, Meritorious Unit Commendation, Presidential Unit Citation, Submarine Division 62 Battle Efficiency "E"
- 1970, Marjorie Sterrett Battleship Fund Award for Operational Proficiency, for the Atlantic Fleet, Submarine Division 63 Battle Efficiency "E", Navy Expeditionary Medal (Sub Specop)
- 1973, Navy Unit Commendation
- 1979, Meritorious Unit Commendation, Submarine Squadron Six ASW/Operations "A", Submarine Squadron Six Engineering "E"
- 1982, Meritorious Unit Commendation, Submarine Squadron Six ASW/Operations "A"
- 1983, Meritorious Unit Commendation, Navy Battle Efficiency "E"
- 1985, Meritorious Unit Commendation, Navy Battle Efficiency "E"
- 1988, Arctic Expedition Ribbon, ICEX 88
- 1991, Navy Battle Efficiency "E"
