= USS Hammerhead (SSN-663) =

Submarine of the United States

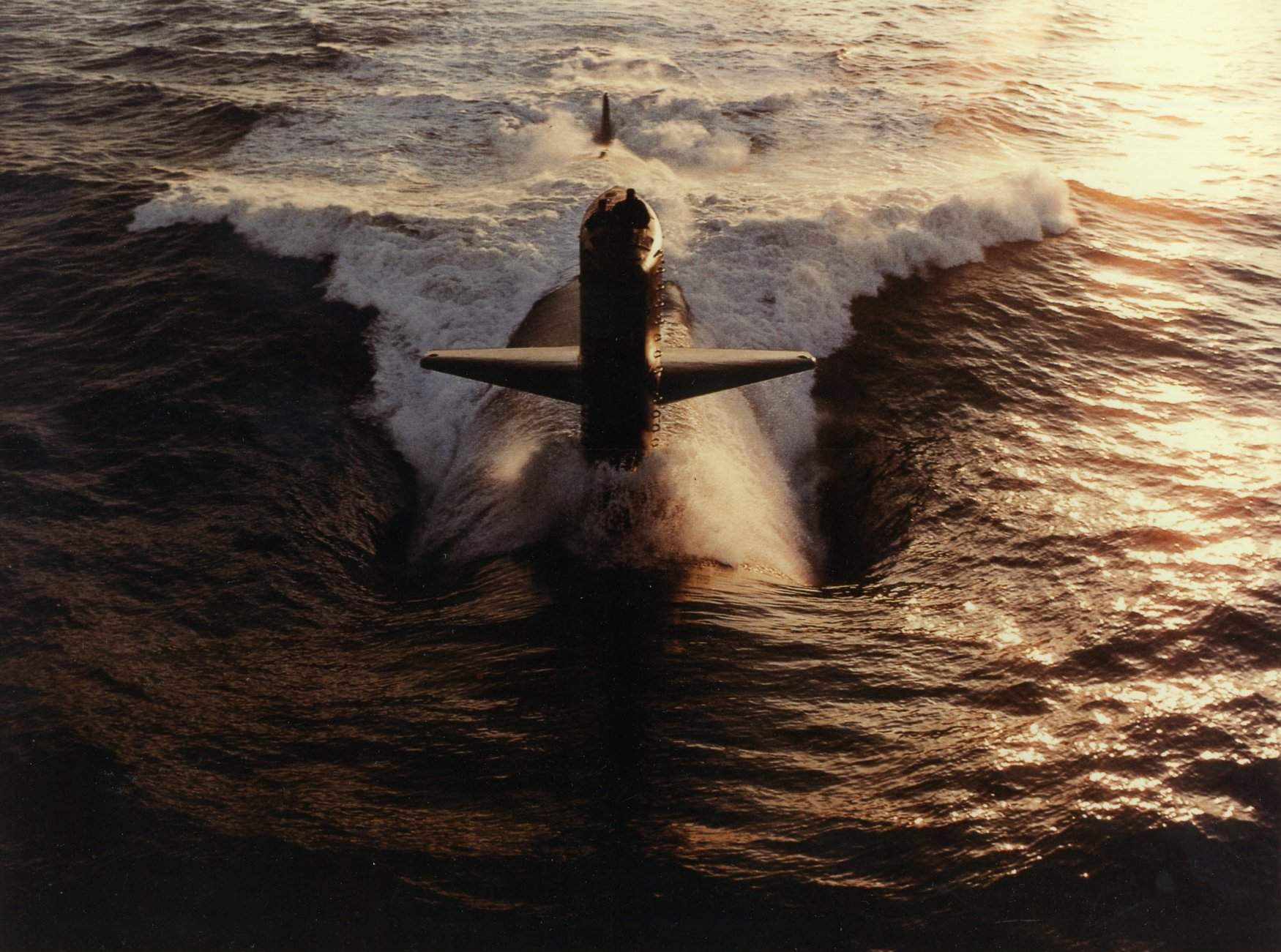
- USS Hammerhead (SSN-663)

History

United States
- Name: USS Hammerhead (SSN-663)
- Namesake: The hammerhead shark
- Ordered: 28 May 1964
- Builder: Newport News Shipbuilding and Dry Dock Company, Newport News, Virginia
- Laid down: 29 November 1965
- Launched: 14 April 1967
- Sponsored by: Mrs. O. Clark Fisher
- Commissioned: 28 June 1968
- Decommissioned: 5 April 1995
- Stricken: 5 April 1995
- Honors and awards: Marjorie Sterrett Battleship Fund Award for U.S. Atlantic Fleet 1981
- Fate: Scrapping via Ship and Submarine Recycling Program completed 22 November 1995

General characteristics
- Class & type: Sturgeon-class attack submarine
- Displacement: 3,860 long tons (3,922 t) light; 4,268 long tons (4,336 t) full; 408 long tons (415 t) dead
- Length: 292 ft 3 in (89.08 m)
- Beam: 31 ft 8 in (9.65 m)
- Draft: 28 ft 8 in (8.74 m)
- Installed power: 15,000 shaft horsepower (11 megawatts)
- Propulsion: One S5W nuclear reactor, two steam turbines, one screw
- Speed: 15 knots (28 km/h; 17 mph) surfaced; 25 knots (46 km/h; 29 mph) submerged
- Test depth: 1,300 ft (396 m)
- Complement: 109 (14 officers, 95 enlisted men
- Sensors & processing systems: BPS-14/15 surface search radar; BQQ-5 multi-function bow mounted sonar; BQR-7 passive in submarines with BQQ-2 sonar; BQS-12 active 7 sonar; TB-16 or TB-23 towed array sonar
- Electronic warfare & decoys: WLQ-4(V); WLR-4(V); WLR-9
- Armament: 4 × 21-inch (533 mm) torpedo tubes; Mark 48 torpedoes; UUM-44A SUBROC missiles; UGM-84A/C Harpoon missiles; Mark 57 deep-water mines; Mark 60 CAPTOR mines; Tomahawk Land Attack Missile

USS Hammerhead (SSN-663), a Sturgeon-class submarine, was the second ship of the United States Navy to be named for the hammerhead shark, a voracious fish found in warm seas, with a curious hammerlike head.

== Construction and commissioning ==
The contract to build Hammerhead was awarded to Newport News Shipbuilding and Dry Dock Company at Newport News, Virginia, on 28 May 1964 and her keel was laid down there on 29 November 1965. She was launched on 14 April 1967, sponsored by Mrs. O. Clark Fisher, and commissioned on 28 June 1968.

== Service history ==
In 1981, she won the Marjorie Sterrett Battleship Fund Award for the Atlantic Fleet.

Tom Clancy, author of the 1984 novel The Hunt for Red October, was given a brief ride into port aboard Hammerhead in the late 1980s prior to the filming of the 1990 film adaptation of the novel, also entitled The Hunt for Red October. After spotting a mounted roll of toilet paper in Hammerhead's sonar room used for wiping grease pencil markings off the screens in the rooms, he proclaimed his intention to write the contrasting image of the low-technology toilet paper mount among all of the complicated electronics and other equipment aboard Hammerhead into the film. True to his word, he did.

== Decommissioning and disposal ==
Hammerhead, under the command of Commander Forrest Novacek, was decommissioned on 5 April 1995 and stricken from the Naval Vessel Register on the same day. Her scrapping via the Nuclear-Powered Ship and Submarine Recycling Program at Puget Sound Naval Shipyard in Bremerton, Washington, was completed on 22 November 1995.
