= Submarine Squadron 11 =

Submarine Squadron Eleven
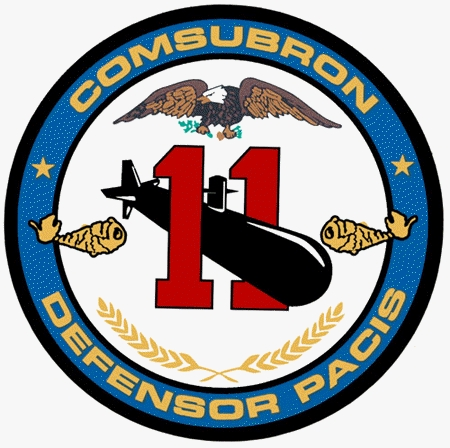
- The Crest for Submarine Squadron 11
- Active: 1 July 1986-Present
- Country: United States of America
- Branch: United States Navy
- Size: 27 officers, 213 enlisted personnel
- Part of: U.S. Pacific Fleet (USPACFLT)
- Garrison/HQ: Point Loma Submarine Base, San Diego, California
- Motto: Defensor Pacis

Commanders
- Current commander: Commodore - CAPT Kenneth Douglas

Submarine Squadron 11 (also known as SUBRON 11) is a squadron of submarines based at Point Loma Submarine Base, San Diego, California, United States. Submarine Squadron 11 was commissioned July 1, 1986, aboard her flagship, McKee, at Naval Submarine Base Point Loma, San Diego. Their missions include anti-submarine, anti-surface, strike, special and mine warfare, intelligence, surveillance and reconnaissance. The squadron currently consists of four Los Angeles-class submarines for deployments to the Western Pacific, Indian Ocean and the Persian Gulf.

== History ==
Submarine Squadron 11 is a squadron of submarines based in San Diego, California. It consists of four Los Angeles-class submarines, a floating dry-dock, Arco, and Undersea Rescue Command. The squadron staff is responsible for providing training, material and personnel readiness support for all units. Submarine Squadron 11 is located on Naval Base Point Loma in San Diego, Calif.

Submarine Squadron 11 was commissioned July 1, 1986, aboard her flagship, McKee, at Naval Submarine Base Point Loma, San Diego.

Submarine Squadron 11 has been upgraded with new subs as older ones have been transferred out or retired, allowing for an improved sensor and weapon systems.

Submarine Squadron 11 units maintain a very aggressive operational schedule, including training and operations with other ships in the Southern California operating area, independent operations to enhance readiness and deployments to the Western Pacific, Indian Ocean and the Persian Gulf. Their missions include anti-submarine, anti-surface, strike, special and mine warfare, intelligence, surveillance and reconnaissance.

On March 13, 2023, Squadron 11 was visited by President Joe Biden along with the prime ministers of Australia and the United Kingdom. The occasion was to announce an agreement among the allies to provide nuclear-powered attack submarines to Australia. This is believed to be the first time a sitting president has visited Naval Base Point Loma since its establishment in 1998.

== Assignments ==
- Commander, Submarine Squadron 11 (CSS 11):
  - Los Angeles-class submarines:
    - USS Scranton (SSN-756)
    - USS Alexandria (SSN-757)
    - USS Santa Fe (SSN-763)
    - USS Hampton (SSN-767)
    - USS Greeneville (SSN-772)
  - USS Arco (ARDM-5)
  - Undersea Rescue Command

== Support vessels ==
- USS Arco (ARDM 5) — Floating Drydock
- Undersea Rescue Command (URC)

== Commanders ==
CAPT Brent Genoble - September 2008 - July 2010

CAPT Rich Correll - July 2010 to June 2012

CAPT Thomas Ishee - June 2012 to February 2014

CAPT Eugene Doyle - February 2014 to February 2016

CAPT Brian Davies - February 2016 to August 2017

CAPT Chris Cavanaugh - August 2017 to August 2019

CAPT Patrick Friedman - August 2019 to May 2022

CAPT Kenneth Douglas - May 2022 to Present

== Submarines that have historically belonged to SUBRON 11 ==
- USS Blueback (SS-581)
- USS Plunger (SSN-595)
- USS Barb (SSN-596)
- USS Pogy (SSN-647)
- USS Guitarro (SSN-665)
- USS Pintado (SSN-672)
- USS Drum (SSN-677)
- USS William H. Bates (SSN-680)
- USS Bremerton (SSN-698)
- USS La Jolla (SSN-701)
- USS Albuquerque (SSN-706)
- USS Portsmouth (SSN-707)
- USS Houston (SSN-713)
- USS Salt Lake City (SSN-716)
- USS Chicago (SSN-721)
- USS Louisville (SSN-724)
- USS Helena (SSN-725)
- USS Jefferson City (SSN-759)
- USS Asheville (SSN-758)
- USS Topeka (SSN-754)
- USS San Francisco (SSN-711)
- USS Pasadena (SSN-752)
- USS Annapolis (SSN-760)

== Support ships or vessels that have historically belonged to SUBRON 11 ==
- USS Dixon (AS-37) — Submarine Tender
- USS McKee (AS-41) — Submarine Tender
- USS Sperry (AS-12) — Submarine Tender
