= USS Asheville (SSN-758) =

Los Angeles-class nuclear-powered attack submarine of the US Navy

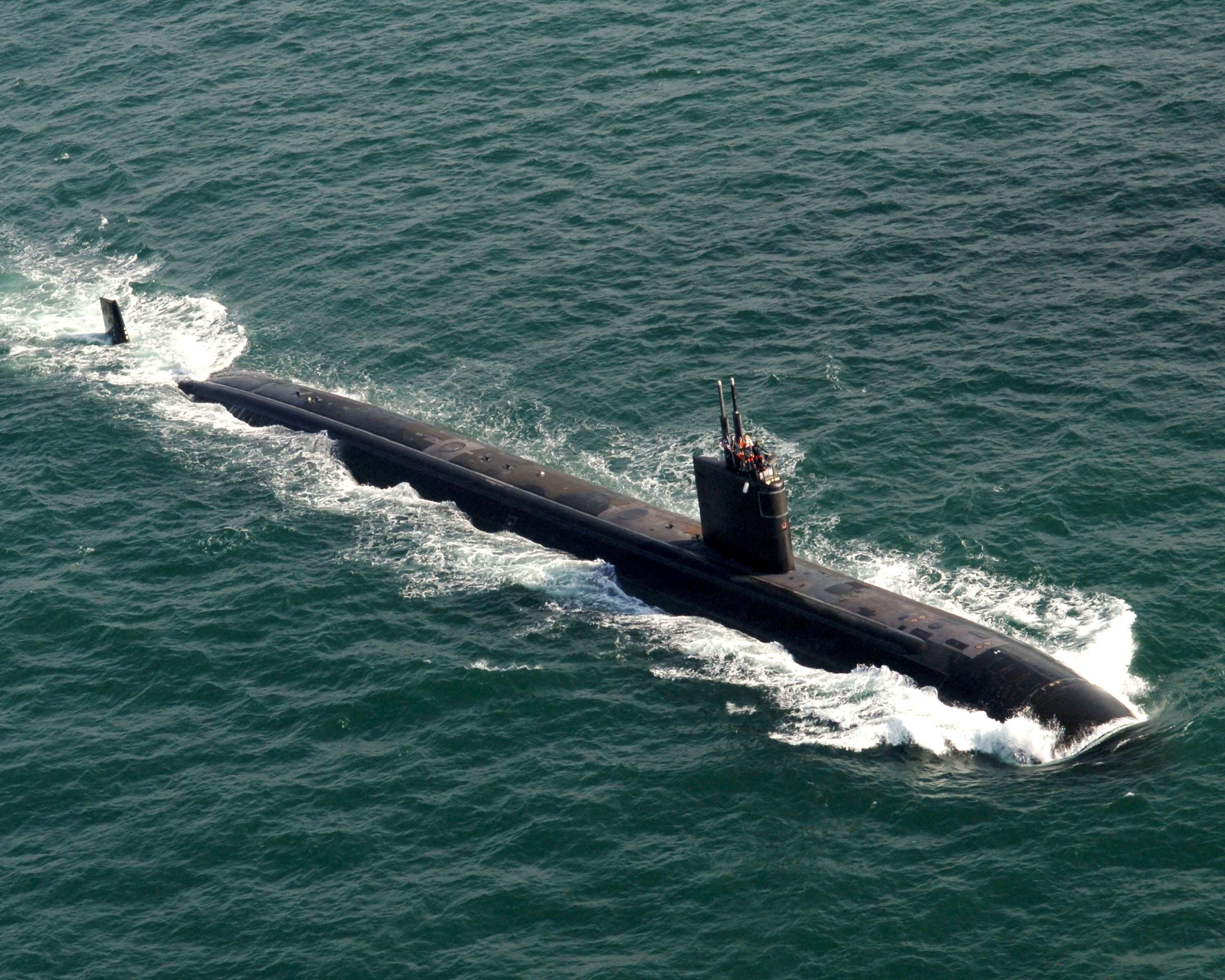
- USS Asheville (SSN-758)

History

United States
- Name: USS Asheville (SSN-758)
- Namesake: City of Asheville
- Awarded: 26 November 1984
- Builder: Newport News Shipbuilding and Dry Dock Company
- Laid down: 9 January 1987
- Launched: 24 February 1990
- Christened: 28 October 1989
- Commissioned: 28 September 1991
- Home port: Naval Base Guam
- Motto: From The Mountains, To The Seas
- Nickname(s): The Ghost of the Coast
- Status: in active service
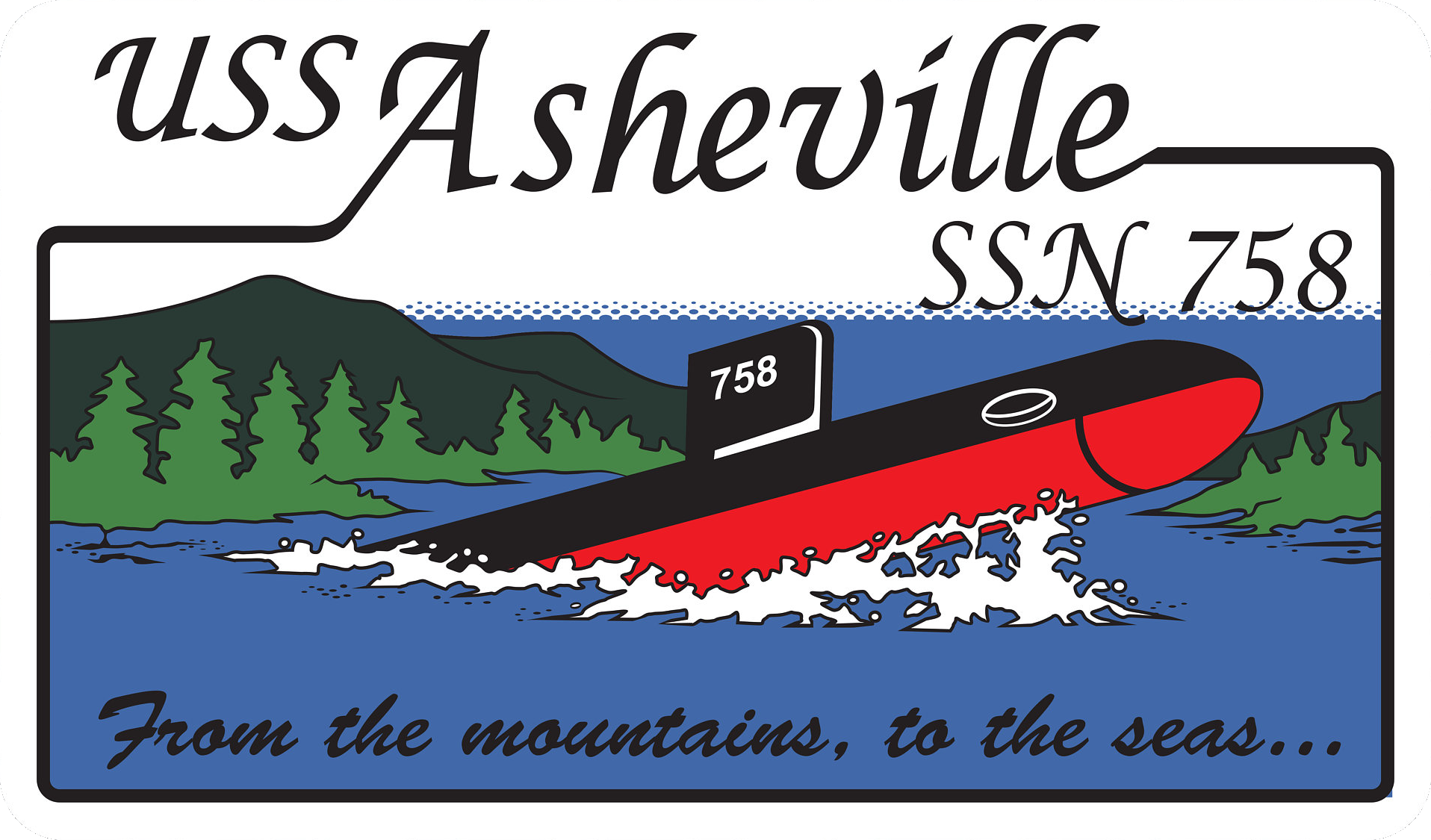
- Badge

General characteristics
- Class & type: Los Angeles-class submarine
- Displacement: 6000 tons light, 6927 tons full, 927 tons dead
- Length: 362 ft (110 m)
- Beam: 33 ft (10 m)
- Draft: 31 ft (9.4 m)
- Propulsion: 1 × S6G PWR nuclear reactor with D2W core (165 MW), HEU 93.5%; 2 × steam turbines (33,500) shp; 1 × shaft; 1 × secondary propulsion motor 325 hp (242 kW)
- Speed: Surfaced:20 knots (23 mph; 37 km/h) Submerged: +20 knots (23 mph; 37 km/h) (official)
- Complement: 20 officers, 110 enlisted
- Sensors & processing systems: BQQ-5 passive sonar, BQS-15 detecting and ranging sonar, WLR-8 fire control radar receiver, WLR-9 acoustic receiver for detection of active search sonar and acoustic homing torpedoes, BRD-7 radio direction finder
- Electronic warfare & decoys: WLR-10 countermeasures set
- Armament: 4 × 21 in (533 mm) bow tubes, 10 Mk48 ADCAP torpedo reloads, Tomahawk land attack missile block 3 SLCM range 1,700 nautical miles (3,100 km), Harpoon anti–surface ship missile range 70 nautical miles (130 km), mine laying Mk67 mobile Mk60 captor mines

USS Asheville (SSN-758), is a Los Angeles-class nuclear powered fast attack submarine. She is the fourth vessel of the United States Navy to be named for Asheville, North Carolina. The contract to build her was awarded to Newport News Shipbuilding and Dry Dock Company in Newport News, Virginia, on 26 November 1984 and her keel was laid down on 9 January 1987. She was launched on 24 February 1990, sponsored by Mrs. Dorothy Helms, and commissioned on 28 September 1991.

Asheville was fitted with a developmental Advanced Mine Detection System (AMDS) high-frequency active sonar array with transmitters and receivers in the sail and in a disc-shaped chin sonar dome beneath the hull at the bow. The system is used for target detection, mine avoidance, and bottom navigation. After a highly successful testing period the system was removed during overhaul in 2003.

== History ==
=== 1990s ===
In December 1996, Asheville served as a trials platform for the Northrop Grumman Sea Ferret reconnaissance drone. After Asheville simulated an underwater launch, a Cessna 206 test aircraft flew over the area of operations with the Sea Ferret attached to its underside. Technicians aboard Asheville transmitted commands to the Sea Ferret, which were received and responded to by the Cessna pilot. Control of the drone was then passed back and forth among the Asheville team, USMC First Force RECON, and a United States Army Aviation team, with all three teams continuing to receive a continuous flow of sensor data.

In August 1998 Asheville returned from a six-month Western Pacific Deployment (WESTPAC). After a 30-day stand down, she entered an extended maintenance period at Pearl Harbor Naval Shipyard remaining there until the beginning 1999. Almost immediately after the maintenance period Asheville began a work-up for another six-month deployment to the Western Pacific. This work-up included various underway periods, for weekly operations.

At the end of May 1999, Asheville conducted two family day cruises. The first left Pearl Harbor and steamed to Lahaina, Maui. Asheville anchored a mile off the Maui coast for five days. She returned to Pearl Harbor, at the end of the week, with the second group of family members aboard.

In July 1999, she deployed to the Eastern Pacific (EASTPAC) for two months, continuing work-ups with the John C. Stennis (CVN-74) Carrier Strike Group (CSG). During this deployment, she visited San Diego, CA, Esquimalt and Victoria, British Columbia, and Ketchikan, Alaska. While conducting sound testing off the coast of Ketchikan, Asheville was suspended at a depth of 400 feet, and held in position by four mooring buoys above. During this 36-hour period, the crew made phone calls with a line rigged though an electrical fitting. After the testing, the boat surfaced. Some of the crew members swam in the 50-degree waters of Behm Canal.

Asheville returned to Pearl Harbor, at the end of August, 1999 and conducted a six-week upkeep period. At the end of October 1999, she returned to San Diego for three weeks where she completed final work-ups with the John C. Stennis CSG, including staged attacks on the ship. Asheville was the only ship in the Carrier Group that was not successfully boarded or attacked. Another part of this final work up included Naval Special Warfare, off the coast of California, when Asheville launched a BGM-109 Tomahawk Cruise Missile. After the launch, an F-14 Tomcat pilot took control of the missile. The missile flew to Naval Air Weapons Station China Lake, California, hitting the target perfectly. Asheville returned to Pearl Harbor at the end of November, 1999. She completed a six-week upkeep period, and made final preparations for her forthcoming deployment.

=== 2000s ===
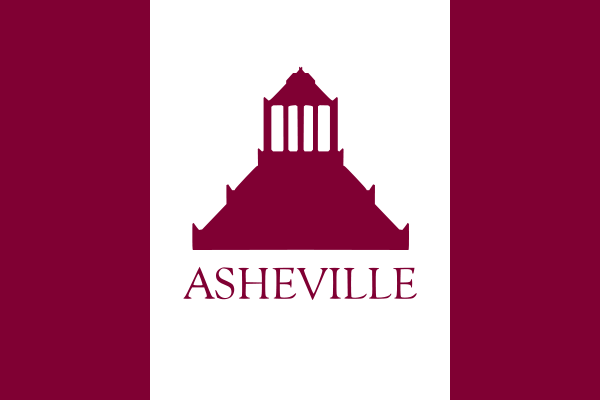
The City of Asheville's Flag. USS Asheville's P/T Banner.

On 11 January 2000, Asheville departed Pearl Harbor for a six-month WESTPAC Deployment. She was part of the John C. Stennis CSG. This Group included the carrier John C. Stennis, guided missile cruisers Lake Champlain and Port Royal, destroyer Elliot, guided missile destroyer Russell, amphibious warfare ships Denver and Pearl Harbor, guided missile frigate Thach, fast combat support ship Bridge, and sister submarine Jefferson City. Asheville arrived in Yokosuka, Japan on 27 January 2000, in time for the crew to watch Super Bowl XXXIV. She departed Yokosuka, on 3 February, and arrived in Hong Kong on 8 February, sailing into Victoria Harbour along with the entire John C. Stennis Carrier Group. She was tied up alongside Lake Champlain for electric power. Asheville left Hong Kong on 12 February, and arrived in Singapore, on 17 February. On 21 February, she departed Singapore, and arrived in Manama, Bahrain on 7 March 2000. During this time Asheville completed a mission vital to National Security, the details of which remain classified. She left Bahrain that night after loading stores and became the first submarine to participate in Maritime Interdiction Operations (MIO). On 18 March 2000 Asheville arrived in the free port of Jebel Ali, United Arab Emirates. On 23 March, she left Jebel Ali and returned to Manama, Bahrain on 28 March.

Asheville departed Bahrain on 3 April to head back to the Pacific, turning over Carrier Group responsibilities to Jefferson City. Prior to leaving the area, Asheville completed a second, National Security mission. While in transit to a port call in Australia, the crew received word that three sailors from the command ship Blue Ridge had assaulted a taxi driver in Cebu, Philippines. In an effort to smooth tensions with the Philippine Government, Asheville was directed to make way for Subic Bay, Philippines. Prior to pulling into Subic Bay, the captain took Asheville to a location a few miles south of the Equator for crew members to become Shellbacks. The next day while steaming north, Asheville stopped off the coast of Borneo where the captain allowed a swim call. On 28 April 2000, Asheville pulled into Subic Bay, and became the second U.S. Navy submarine to port in Subic Bay Freeport in four years. While there, Asheville sailors assisted in renovating a school, and conducted a VIP tour and cruise for top members of the Philippine government. The day was cut short due to a suspected coup attempt, with the emergence of Abu Sayyaf. Asheville returned to port, returning the VIP's and taking on crew members previously left ashore.

Asheville departed Subic Bay on 3 May, returning to Yokosuka, Japan, on 8 May to complete an upkeep period. On 15 May, she departed Yokosuka, Japan to complete a third, National Security mission. On 15 June 2000, Asheville arrived in Sasebo, Japan, and tied up alongside the submarine tender Frank Cable for weapons exchange. After an eight-day stay in Sasebo, she departed for home on 22 June. On the way home, Asheville conducted an Operational Reactor Safeguard Examination (ORSE). The ORSE team was brought on board 1 July. After a night of successful "Drilling and Spilling", the ORSE Board gave Asheville a high score. She returned to Pearl Harbor in time for Fourth of July celebrations, to the sound of the submarine and surface ship whistles, on 2 July. During this deployment, Asheville reported to; COMSUBRON III, COMSUBGRU 7, CTF-74, CTF-54, as well as the Commander of Carrier Strike Group Seven.

On 1 April 2005 Asheville returned to San Diego, California, after a six-month deployment to the Western Pacific. While deployed she performed National Security Missions, and took part in two international exercises. During the deployment, she made port calls at Guam, Singapore, Japan, Saipan, and Hawaii. On 1 August 2006, Asheville departed San Diego to return to the Western Pacific, for another six-month Deployment. While deployed, she made port calls at Yokosuka, Japan, Hong Kong, Saipan, & Guam. She returned to her home port of San Diego, California, on 3 February 2007. On 27 April 2007, Asheville entered Floating Dry Dock Arco, at Naval Base Point Loma, for a scheduled maintenance period. On 16 August 2007 she, exited Arco, having completed her upkeep. In 2009 Asheville completed pre-deployment preparations and returned to the Western Pacific.

=== 2010s ===
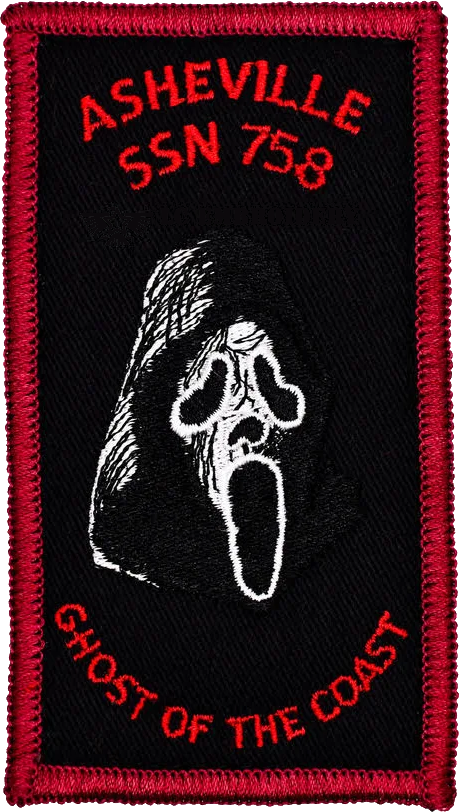
Patch worn on 2POC uniform by Asheville crewmen.

She deployed from 3 February until 3 August 2010, and made multiple port calls in Guam and Sasebo. Having completed a Western Pacific deployment, she commenced preparations for further operations by returning to the floating drydock, Arco. This maintenance period prepared her for a Southern Command area of responsibility deployment. She was deployed from mid-August to 16 December 2011, twice visiting Panama City, Panama.

== Awards ==
Asheville has received many awards during her service.

- Meritorious Unit Commendation (2)
- Navy "E" Ribbon Squadron Battle "E" Award
- Navy Expeditionary Medal
- National Defense Medal
- Armed Forces Expeditionary Medal
- Southwest Asia Service Medal
- Sea Service Ribbon
- Engineering Excellence RED "E" (2)
- Medical Yellow "M"
- Navigation Red/Green N (2)
- 1999 Submarine Squadron III Commodore's Cup
- Captain Edward Ney Award Silver Medal (2)
- CINCPACFLEET Gold Anchor
- CINCPACFLEET Silver Anchor
- Submarine Squadron Eleven Tactical "T" 2010

== In popular culture ==
- In the 1994 Tom Clancy novel Debt of Honor, Asheville is sunk by a Japanese navy submarine after a surprise attack, during what was supposed to be a training operation.
