= Naval Base Point Loma =

US Navy installation in San Diego, California, United States

Coordinates: 32°40′37″N 117°14′41″W

- San Diego, California in the United States
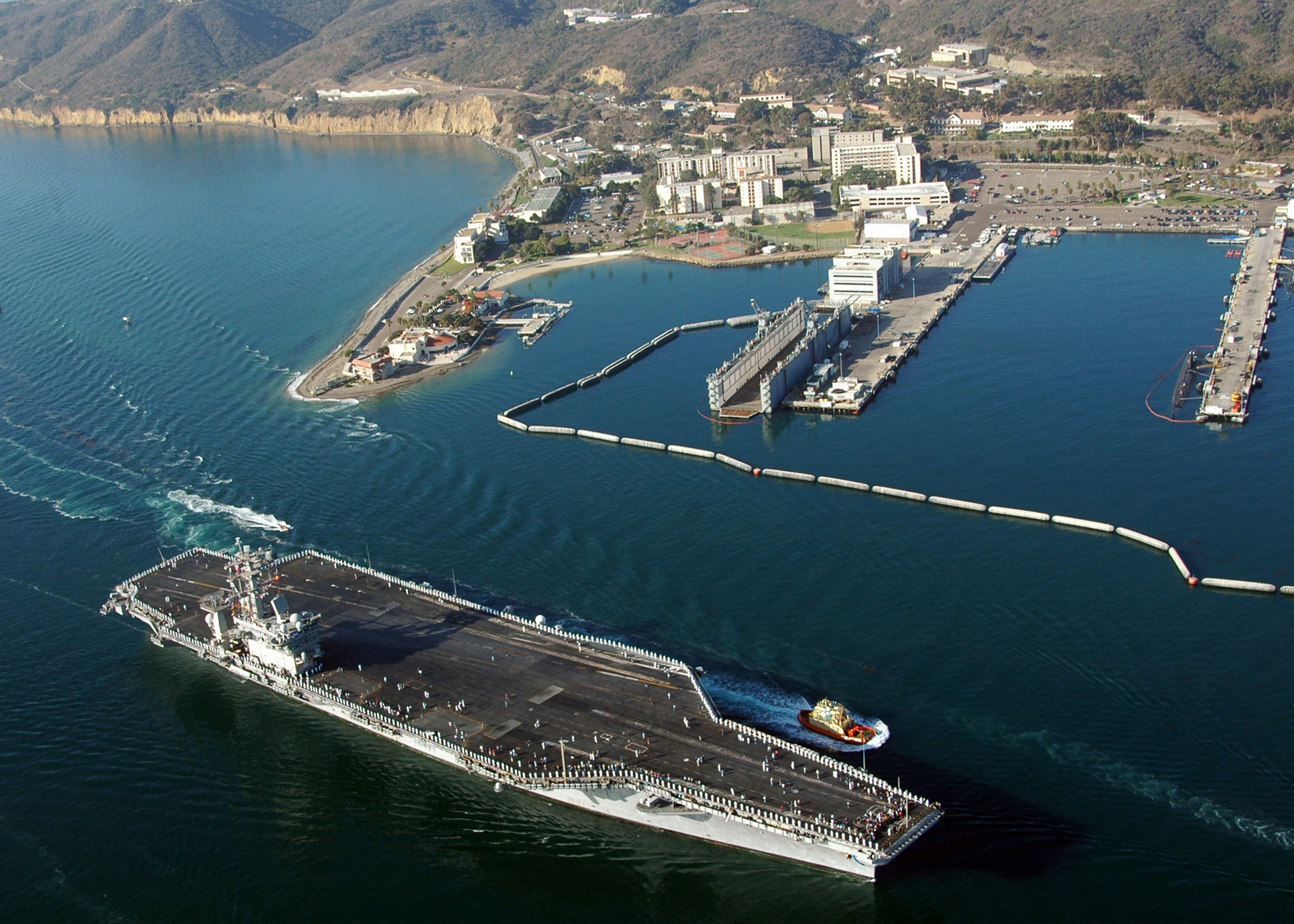
- USS Nimitz (CVN 68) passes Naval Base Point Loma

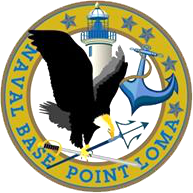

Site information
- Owner: Department of Defense
- Operator: US Navy
- Controlled by: Navy Region Southwest
- Condition: Operational
- Website: Official website

Location
- Location within California Location within the United States

Site history
- Built: 1959
- In use: 1959 – present

Garrison information
- Current commander: Captain Jeff Yackeren

California Historical Landmark
- Official name: Fort Rosecrans
- Reference no.: 62

Naval Base Point Loma (NBPL) is a United States Navy base in Point Loma, a neighborhood of San Diego, California. It was established on 1 October 1998 when Navy facilities in the Point Loma area of San Diego were consolidated under Commander, Navy Region Southwest. Naval Base Point Loma consists of seven facilities: Submarine Base, Naval Mine and Anti-Submarine Warfare Command (previously Fleet Anti-Submarine Warfare Command), Fleet Combat Training Center Pacific, Naval Information Warfare Systems Command (NAVWAR), Naval Information Warfare Center Pacific (NIWC Pacific), the Fleet Intelligence Command Pacific and Naval Consolidated Brig, Miramar. These close-knit commands form a diverse and highly technical hub of naval activity. The on-base population is around 22,000 Navy and civilian personnel.

== History ==

The history of Point Loma Naval Base begins in 1795. The Spanish began building a fort at the base of Point Guijarros, opposite the tip of North Island (Coronado). This fort was built on the land which is today known as Ballast Point. Fort Guijarros was later finished in 1798 and then abandoned by the Mexicans in 1845. In 1846 United States Capt. Samuel Du Pont, entered the abandoned land where the fort once stood and raised the American flag. Shortly after in 1848 the Treaty of Guadalupe Hidalgo ended the Mexican–American War and the Americans claimed Point Loma.

In February 1852 President Millard Fillmore set aside the southern portion of Point Loma of about 1,400 acres (6 km^{2}) for military purposes. Subsequently, it was assigned to the U.S. Army and named 'Fort Rosecrans', after Major General William Rosecrans, an 1842 graduate of the U.S. Military Academy. In 1898 the Army built a coast artillery installation on the site which remained active until 1945, when the University of California Division of War Research and the Navy Radio and Sound Laboratory occupied the site as the Navy Electronics Laboratory (NEL). NEL was renamed the Naval Ocean Systems Center (NOSC) in 1977 and incorporated into the Space and Naval Warfare Systems Command (SPAWAR) in 1997.

In 1932, the site of Fort Rosecrans was registered as California Historical Landmark #62.

From February 1940 through October 1944 Fort Rosecrans was garrisoned by the 19th Coast Artillery Regiment.

Aerial view of Naval Base Point Loma

Submarine Group, San Diego was established in 1946, and Submarine Flotilla 1 was activated in 1949. In 1959 Fort Rosecrans was turned over to the United States Navy. The Navy Submarine Support Facility was established in November 1963 on 280 acres (1.1 km^{2}) of the land. Bathyscaphe Trieste arrived at NEL in 1958; and modified Bathyscaphe Trieste II was based here from 1965 to 1984. On 27 November 1974 the base was re-designated a shore command, serving assigned submarines, Submarine Group Five, Submarine Squadron Three, Submarine Development Group One, the Submarine Training Facility and later, Submarine Squadron Eleven. On 1 October 1981, the base was designated as Naval Submarine Base San Diego (NAVSUBASE San Diego).

Starting in April 1995, several commands were decommissioned or their homeports were changed to meet the post-Cold War downsizing requirements of the Navy. Commands throughout San Diego were regionalized to provide equal or better base services while managing a reduced budget. The six naval installations on Point Loma were consolidated as Naval Base Point Loma on 1 October 1998.

On March 13, 2023, Naval Base Point Loma was visited by President Joe Biden along with the prime ministers of Australia and the United Kingdom. The occasion was to announce an agreement among the allies to provide nuclear-powered attack submarines to Australia. This is believed to be the first time a sitting president has visited Naval Base Point Loma since its establishment in 1998.

== Gallery ==
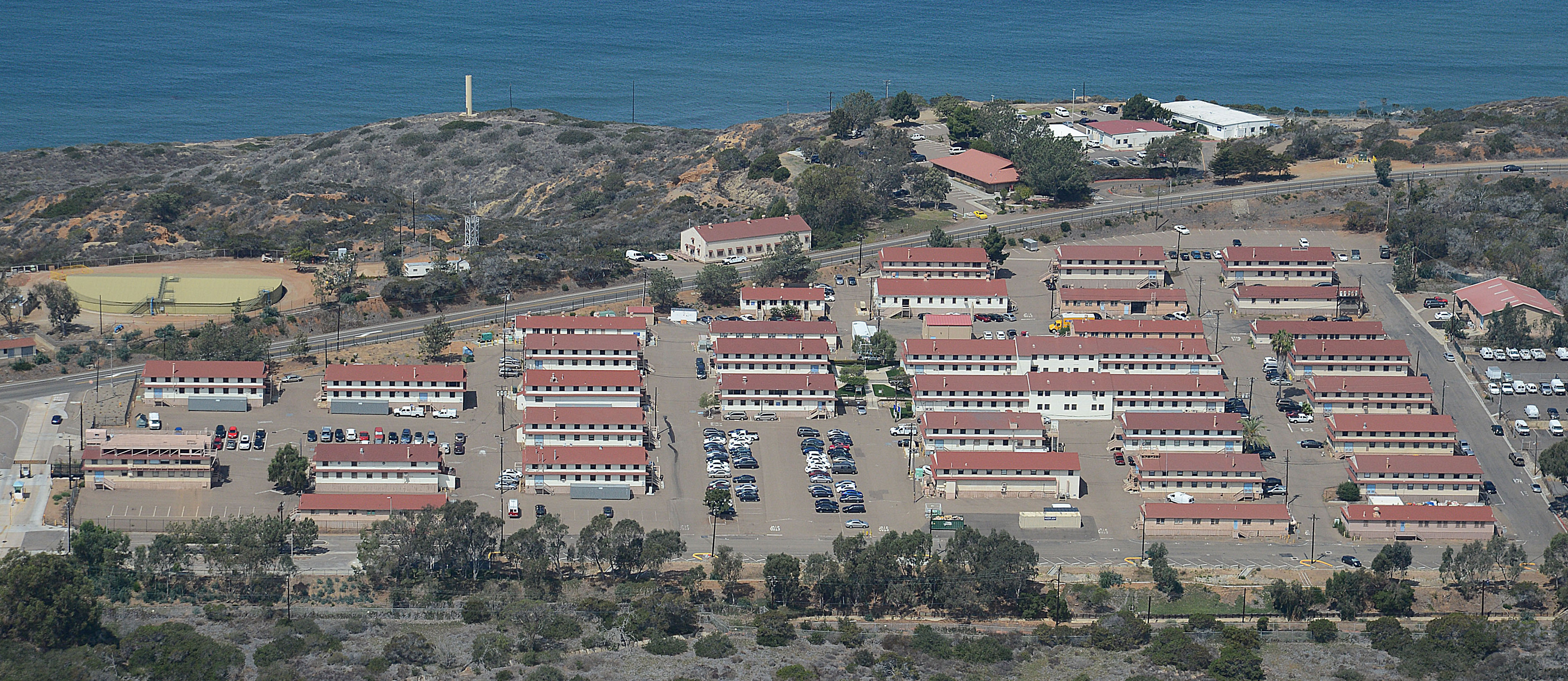
Naval Health Research Center at Naval Base Point Loma

== Tenants ==
=== Homeported submarines ===
- Commander, Submarine Squadron 11 (CSS 11):
  - Los Angeles-class submarines:
    - USS Scranton (SSN-756)
    - USS Alexandria (SSN-757)
    - USS Santa Fe (SSN-763)
    - USS Hampton (SSN-767)
    - USS Greeneville (SSN-772)
  - USS Arco (ARDM-5)
  - Undersea Rescue Command

=== Torpedo Weapons Retrievers ===
- Devil Ray (TWR-6)

The Devil Ray (ATWR-6) was transferred to the Naval Research Laboratory in early 2021 and now is home ported at NRL's Chesapeake Bay Detachment (NRL CBD) in Chesapeake Beach, MD. It is expected to be refitted to support NRL research efforts during the remainder of 2021.

- Swamp Fox (TWR-821)
- Narwhal (TWR-842)

=== Major commands ===
- Commander, U.S. Third Fleet
- Naval Mine and Anti-Submarine Warfare Command – Effective 1 October 2006, COMINEWARCOM (CMWC) and FLTASWCOM were merged and renamed as Naval Mine And Anti-Submarine Warfare Command (NMAWC). Pending NMAWC Corpus Christi (PLA: NMAWC Corpus Christi TX) relocation associated with BRAC action, NMAWC was multi-sited with the commander and Vice Commander and headquarters in San Diego (PLA: NMAWC San Diego CA). FLTASWCOM DET NORFOLK is renamed NMAWC DET NORFOLK VA (PLA: NMAWC DET Norfolk VA). NMAWC San Diego, in addition to commander NMAWC duties, continues to focus on ASW matters. NMAWC Corpus Christi continues to focus on MIW matters. Additionally, NMAWC Corpus Christi continues to function as the flag officer commanding the deployable mine warfare battle staff, providing technical advice, and conducting mine warfare operations as required; and coordinates the sourcing for the MCMRONS and MIW Triad Forces (AMCM/UMCM/SMCM).
- Submarine Squadron 11
- Military Sealift Command, Pacific

== See also ==
- Naval Training Center San Diego
- United States Navy submarine bases
