= USS William H. Bates =

Submarine of the United States

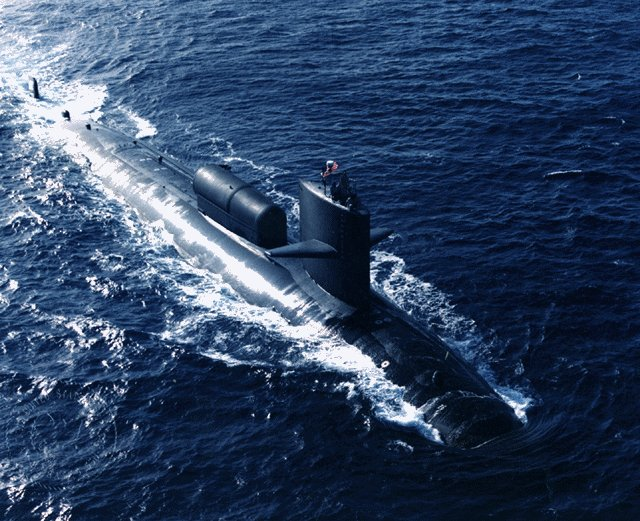
- USS William H. Bates (SSN-680) with a Dry Deck Shelter on her deck abaft her sail.

History

United States
- Name: USS William H. Bates (SSN-680)
- Namesake: William H. Bates (1917–1969), U.S. Representative from Massachusetts's 6th Congressional District (1950–1969)
- Ordered: 25 June 1968
- Builder: Ingalls Shipbuilding, Pascagoula, Mississippi General Dynamics Electric Boat
- Laid down: 4 August 1969
- Launched: 11 December 1971
- Sponsored by: Mrs. Andrew R. Grainger
- Commissioned: 5 May 1973
- Decommissioned: 11 February 2000
- Stricken: 11 February 2000
- Motto: A Spirit Unquell'd
- Fate: Scrapping via Ship and Submarine Recycling Program begun 1 October 2002, completed 30 October 2002
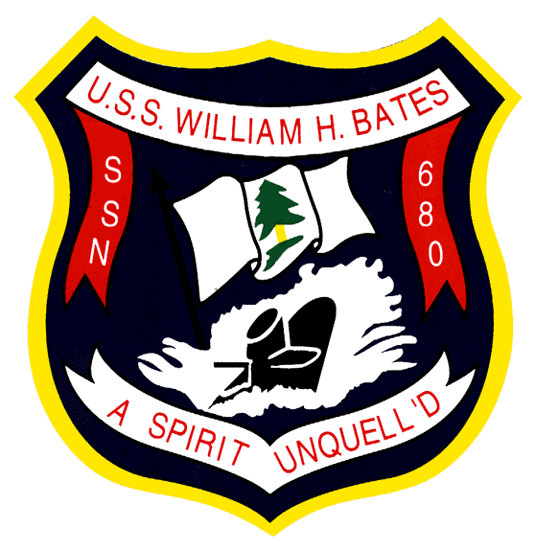
- Badge

General characteristics
- Class & type: Sturgeon-class attack submarine
- Displacement: 3,978 long tons (4,042 t) light; 4,270 long tons (4,339 t) full; 292 long tons (297 t) dead
- Length: 302 ft 3 in (92.13 m)
- Beam: 31 ft 8 in (9.65 m)
- Draft: 28 ft 8 in (8.74 m)
- Installed power: 15,000 shaft horsepower (11.2 megawatts)
- Propulsion: One S5W nuclear reactor, two steam turbines, one screw
- Speed: 15 knots (28 km/h; 17 mph) surfaced; 25 knots (46 km/h; 29 mph) submerged
- Test depth: 1,300 feet (400 meters)
- Complement: 126 (14 officers, 112 enlisted men)
- Armament: 4 × 21-inch (533 mm) torpedo tubes

USS William H. Bates (SSN-680), a Sturgeon-class attack submarine, was planned to be the second U.S. Navy ship to be named USS Redfish—for the redfish, a variety of salmon —when the contract to build her was awarded to Ingalls Shipbuilding in Pascagoula, Mississippi, on 25 June 1968. However, upon the 22 June 1969 death of William H. Bates (1917–1969), the U.S. representative from Massachusetts's 6th congressional district (1950–1969) known for his staunch support of nuclear propulsion in the U.S. Navy, she was renamed William H. Bates and was laid down on 4 August 1969 as the only ship of the U.S. Navy to have borne the name. The reason for her naming by then-Secretary of the Navy John Chafee, breaking with a long-standing Navy tradition of naming U.S. Navy attack submarines for sea creatures, was best summed up by Admiral Hyman Rickover, the then-director of the Navy's nuclear reactors program, with the pithy comment that, "Fish don't vote!"

== Construction and commissioning ==
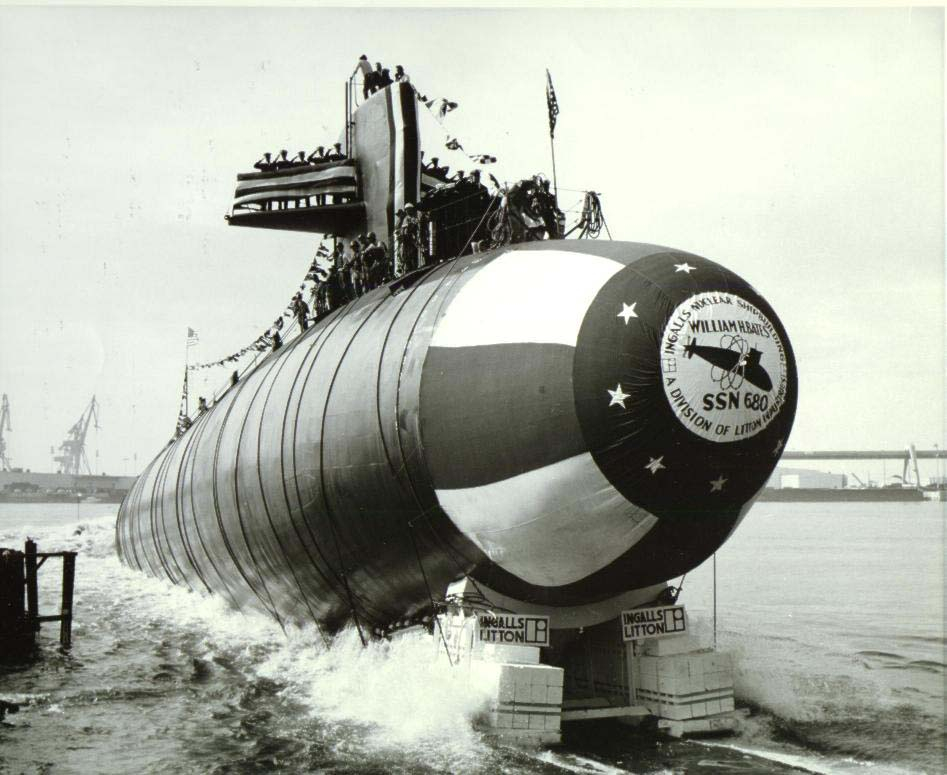
William H. Bates is launched at Ingalls Shipbuilding in Pascagoula, Mississippi, on 11 December 1971.

The contract to build Redfish was awarded on 25 June 1968, and she had been renamed William H. Bates by the time her keel was laid on 4 August 1969 by Ingalls Shipbuilding. She was launched on 11 December 1971, sponsored by Mrs. Andrew R. Grainger, and commissioned on 5 May 1973.

== Service history ==
=== 1973–1979 ===
After shakedown, William H. Bates arrived at her home port, New London, Connecticut. She was deployed to the eastern Atlantic Ocean between July and October 1974 and conducted her first patrol mission before visiting Holy Loch, Scotland, and Halifax, Nova Scotia, Canada, on her way home. However, her respite was brief, for she was again underway on patrol by the latter part of December 1974 and into January 1975. After voyage repairs at Holy Loch, she called at Faslane, Scotland, for a port visit.

Departing Faslane for home in late January 1974, William H. Bates underwent a refit at Norfolk Naval Shipyard in Portsmouth, Virginia, before conducting local operations off Fort Lauderdale, Florida, into the summer of 1975. She was deployed to European waters again soon thereafter, taking part in antisubmarine warfare exercises. In November 1975, she took part in North Atlantic Treaty Organization (NATO) exercises "Moby Dick" and "Ocean Safari '75," before she returned to New London in December 1975.

William H. Bates conducted her first deployment to the Mediterranean Sea in 1976, departing New London on 5 May 1976. During this tour, she honed her skills in exercises with other ships of the U.S. Navy and NATO naval units of foreign countries. During the deployment, she visited Bizerte, Tunisia; Augusta Bay, Sicily; and La Spezia and Naples, Italy. After departing the Mediterranean Sea on 6 September 1976, she took part in exercise "Ocean Safari '76" in mid-month. On 14 October 1976, she returned to New London.

William H. Bates underwent voyage repairs and later prepared for another overseas deployment. She departed New London during the summer of 1977 and completed her assigned mission on 3 October 1977, mooring alongside the submarine tender USS Holland (AS-32) that day. She subsequently transited the North Sea for a port visit to Bremerhaven, West Germany, where she spent five days. She then took part in exercise "Ocean Safari '77" with NATO units while returning from European waters to New London.

William H. Bates operated in the Atlantic into early 1978 until moving to a new home port, San Diego, California, in May 1978 for service in the United States Pacific Fleet.

=== 1978–1989 ===
From 1978 through early 1989, William H. Bates operated from San Diego while attached to Submarine Squadron 11, conducting numerous Western Pacific deployments and operations, such as "Exercise Team Spirit" with the Republic of Korea Navy and the navies of various other countries. During her deployments, she conducted port visits at Subic Bay in the Philippines, at Chinhae in South Korea, at Yokosuka and Sasebo in Japan, at Guam, and at Satahip in Thailand, among other places.

In mid-1989, William H. Bates transited northward from San Diego, stopped at Mare Island Naval Shipyard in Vallejo, California, for minor repairs and to allow her crew to rest, and then continued up the United States West Coast and entered Puget Sound Naval Shipyard at Bremerton, Washington, for an extensive refueling overhaul and retrofit.

=== 1991–2000 ===
In 1991, after completion of the refueling overhaul, William H. Bates' homeport was changed to Pearl Harbor, Hawaii in April, 1991 and assigned to Submarine Squadron 1, from which she completed several Western Pacific deployments and operations during the 1990s, including fit-up of Dry Deck Shelter 06-P in December 1991, a 6-month Western Pacific deployment 18 June-18 December 1992 including port visits in Guam, Yokosuka, and Hong Kong, a 56-day deployment to the Western Pacific 23 June-18 August 1993 which included participation in Exercise Tandem Thrust '93, a port visit in Brisbane, and a Golden Shellback simultaneous crossing of the Equator and International Dateline on 13 August 1993.

== Decommissioning and disposal ==
William H. Bates was decommissioned and simultaneously stricken from the Naval Vessel Register on 11 February 2000. She returned to Puget Sound Naval Shipyard, where her scrapping via the Nuclear-Powered Ship and Submarine Recycling Program began on 1 October 2002 and was completed on 30 October 2002.
