= Sea Ferret =

The Sea Ferret was a submarine-launched aerial reconnaissance drone under development by the United States Navy, designed to be launched from within a Sub-Harpoon missile canister and controlled by a submerged submarine to provide covert surveillance, weapons targeting, choke point interdiction, and battle damage assessment.

While its primary mission was reconnaissance, Sea Ferret was a weapon, carrying a nine-kilogram (20 lb) warhead, capable of destroying smaller targets like command centers and surface-to-air missile launchers.

Sea Ferret was under development by Northrop Grumman Corporation since 1991, and was successfully demonstrated onboard Asheville (SSN-758).

== General characteristics ==
- Weight: 68 kilograms (150 lb)
- Wingspan: 183 centimetres (6.00 ft)
- Range: 600 kilometres (370 mi)
- Loiter: 3 hours
- Speed: 250 knots (290 mph)
- Warhead: 20 lb (9 kg)
