= USS Albuquerque (SSN-706) =

Los Angeles-class nuclear-powered attack submarine of the US Navy

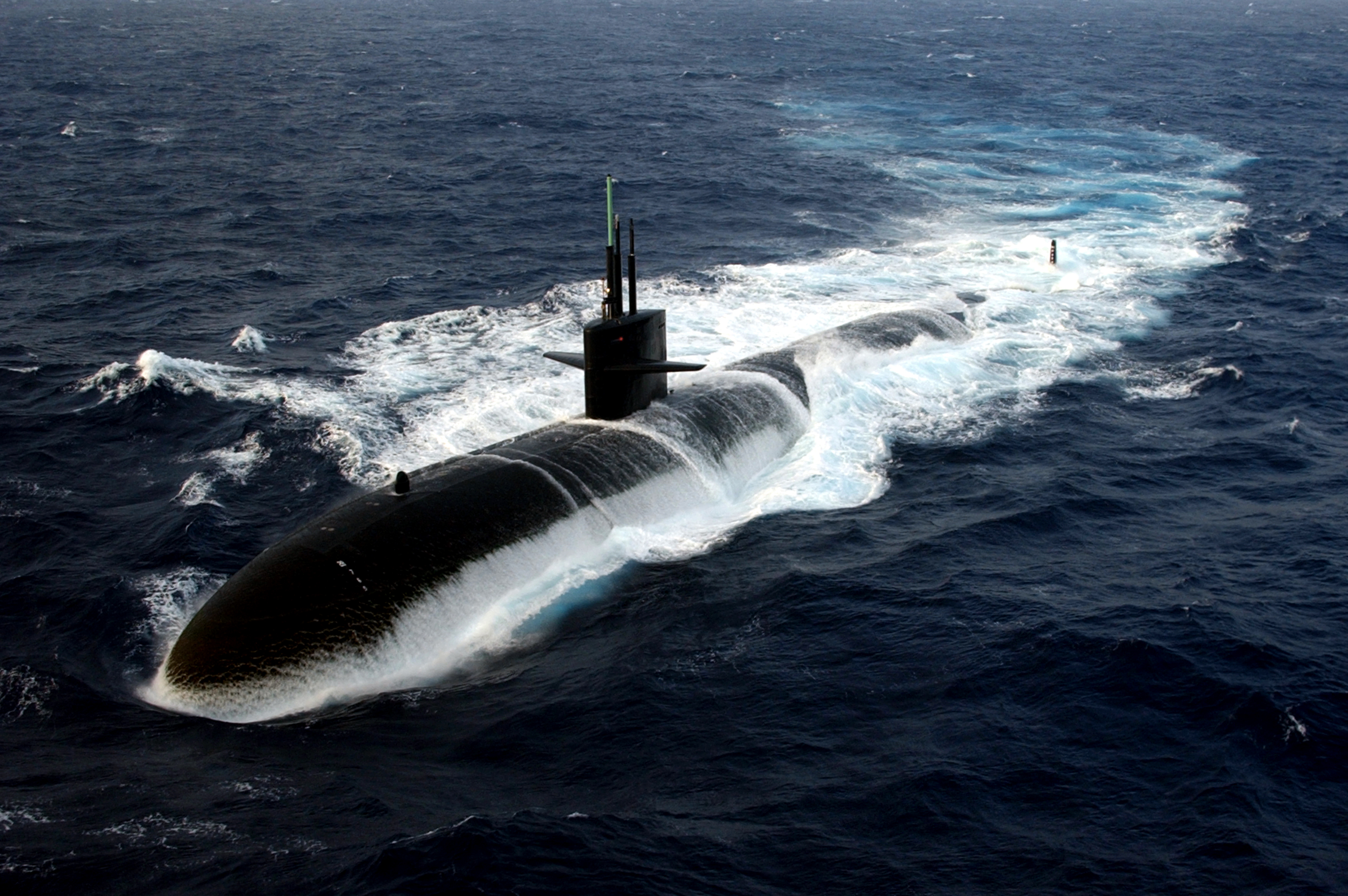
- Albuquerque underway on the surface in the Atlantic Ocean while participating in Majestic Eagle 2004, a multinational exercise being conducted off the coast of Morocco

History

United States
- Name: USS Albuquerque
- Namesake: Albuquerque, New Mexico
- Awarded: 31 October 1973
- Builder: General Dynamics Corporation
- Laid down: 27 December 1979
- Launched: 13 March 1982
- Commissioned: 21 May 1983
- Decommissioned: 27 February 2017
- Out of service: 16 October 2015
- Stricken: 27 February 2017
- Home port: Bremerton, Washington
- Motto: Silentum Excubitor; (Latin for "Silent Sentinel")
- Status: Stricken, to be disposed of by submarine recycling
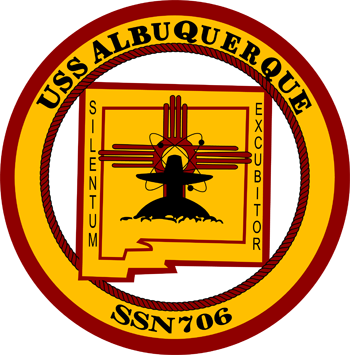
- Badge

General characteristics
- Class & type: Los Angeles-class submarine
- Displacement: 5,758 tons light, 6,120 tons full, 362 tons dead
- Length: 110.3 m (361 ft 11 in)
- Beam: 10 m (32 ft 10 in)
- Draft: 9.7 m (31 ft 10 in)
- Propulsion: S6G nuclear reactor
- Speed: Surfaced: 20 knots (23 mph; 37 km/h); Submerged: +20 knots (23 mph; 37 km/h) (official)
- Complement: 12 officers, 98 men
- Armament: 4 × 21 in (533 mm) bow tubes, 10 Mk48 ADCAP torpedo reloads, Tomahawk land attack missile block 3 SLCM range 1,700 nautical miles (3,100 km), Harpoon anti–surface ship missile range 70 nautical miles (130 km), mine laying Mk67 mobile Mk60 captor mines

Service record
- Part of: Submarine Group 2
- Operations: Kosovo War

USS Albuquerque (SSN-706) was a Los Angeles-class attack submarine of the United States Navy. She was the second U.S. warship to be named for Albuquerque, New Mexico. The contract to build her was awarded to the Electric Boat Division of General Dynamics Corporation in Groton, Connecticut, on 31 October 1973 and her keel was laid down on 27 December 1979. She was launched on 13 March 1982, sponsored by Nancy L. Domenici, and commissioned on 21 May 1983.

== 1983–1989 ==
Albuquerque spent the remainder of 1983 engaged in operations at sea completing a variety of tests, examinations, certifications, and inspections. At the beginning of 1984, Albuquerque reentered Electric Boat Shipyard for post-shakedown availability, returning to sea on 15 April. In May, she transited to the Florida coast for weapons and combat systems certifications. During the summer, she participated in a fleet exercise and took part in a midshipman training cruise. In August, Albuquerque began normal operations from her home port. October and November brought extended operations at sea in the Atlantic Ocean, and, in December, she underwent additional repairs at Electric Boat.

Albuquerque began 1985 with sonar training and weapons systems drills in her local operating area. In February, she completed preparations for a two-month patrol that began on 27 February, returning home at the beginning of May. Operations along the East Coast occupied her time until mid-June when Albuquerque went back to sea. Two months later, she returned and took up local duty until November when she cruised to Florida to serve as a school ship for prospective commanding officers. Albuquerque resumed local operations out of her home port in December.

On 14 January 1986, Albuquerque entered Electric Boat Shipyard for a two-month restricted availability. In March, she began alternating between local evolutions and upkeep in her home port until late May. Between 19 May and 14 September, Albuquerque remained at sea, making port calls in Scotland and England. She returned home in mid-September and, after post-deployment standdown, reported to Exuma Sound late in October for sound trials. She returned to Groton briefly at the beginning of November but put to sea on 4 November to take part in two fleet exercises. Upkeep at New London, Connecticut, took up the period between 24 November and 7 December and an ASW exercise consumed most of December.

== 1990–1999 ==
Albuquerque was operating off the coast of Long Island, New York, during the evening of 17 July 1996, however investigation determined that Albuquerque and several other military units were either out of range, unarmed or did not have the vertical launch capability of reaching TWA Flight 800.

In 1999, Albuquerque participated in a six-month Mediterranean cruise as a part of the USS Theodore Roosevelt battlegroup. The ship pulled into several liberty ports during this cruise, including Naples, La Maddalena, and Toulon. Despite working up as a Special Operations Force (SOF) delivery platform and having a minimal load-out of Tomahawk missiles, Albuquerque quickly became a Tomahawk launch platform during Operation Noble Anvil. The ship fired four strike missions, reloaded missiles in theater, and fired again. Albuquerque completed this Tomahawk mission with a 100% success rate.

== 2000–2009 ==
Albuquerque started a refueling overhaul at the Portsmouth Naval Shipyard (PNSY) 1 July 2001. Albuquerque was commended for being the fastest and most cost-effective Engineered Refueling Overhaul (ERO) in history during the shipyard period, 22.3 months in length. Albuquerque returned to Groton 8 May 2003.

The rest of 2003 was spent conducting local operations, an ORSE, and a weapons system upgrade. Most of 2004 was spent at sea preparing for the ship's first overseas deployment since the shipyard. This included a two-month overseas surge deployment with a port call in Rota, Spain.

Albuquerque conducted a six-month deployment as part of the USS Harry S. Truman Carrier Strike Group from 13 October 2004 to 12 April 2005. The ship made port calls in Scotland, Portugal, Bahrain, Seychelles, and Crete. During this deployment, Albuquerque was awarded the Squadron 2 Battle Efficiency Award for 2004. Albuquerque was homeported in Groton, Connecticut, as part of Submarine Group 2.

=== Alleged treason and espionage by crew member ===
In July 2005, a fire-control technician named Ariel Weinmann deserted from Albuquerque and remained at large until he was arrested in 2006. In addition to desertion, he was charged with espionage, larceny, and destruction of government property. He allegedly passed secret documents to officials at the Russian consulate in Austria, and then tried to pass sensitive information about Albuquerque to agents of unspecified foreign governments in Austria and Mexico, before attempting to defect to Russia. In December 2006, he was sentenced to 12 years in prison.

On 6 August 2009, Albuquerque completed her change of homeport from Groton, Connecticut, to Naval Base Point Loma in order to maintain 60 percent of the submarine force in the Pacific in line with the 2006 QDR.

== 2010–2017 ==
Albuquerque conducted a six-month deployment to the Western Pacific, returning to San Diego 15 December 2011. The deployment covered more than 40,000 nautical miles and included port visits in Brisbane, Australia; Yokosuka, Japan; and Guam. In conjunction with other ships from the U.S., Australian, and Canadian navies, Albuquerque took part in exercise Talisman Sabre 2011.

Albuquerque deployed from San Diego on 29 January 2013 and returned 21 August 2013 after steaming more than 30,000 nautical miles and visiting Yokosuka, Japan, Thailand, Sasebo, Japan and Saipan. The ship participated in several exercises with Japan and Thailand. This deployment included the ship's 1,000th dive and 30th birthday.

Albuquerque sailed into Puget sound on 28 October 2015 after her inactivation in San Diego on 16 October 2015. She was decommissioned on 27 February 2017.
