= Ariel Weinmann =

U.S. Navy sailor convicted of espionage

Αriel Weinmann
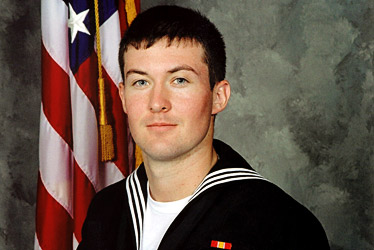
- Fire Control Technician 3rd Class Ariel Weinmann
- Born: 1984 (age 41–42); Mojave Desert, California
- Military career
- Allegiance: United States of America
- Branch: United States Navy
- Service years: 2003– present
- Rank: Formerly Petty Officer 3rd Class (E-4), demoted to Seaman Recruit (E-1) and Dishonorably Discharged

Ariel Weinmann (born 1984) is a former United States Navy sailor who pleaded guilty on December 4, 2006, to espionage, desertion, and other charges. His case is notable as an espionage case where the Navy and trial court officials have denied access to basic information, including the court docket. Weinmann was arrested on March 26, 2006, at the Dallas/Fort Worth International Airport while traveling from Mexico City, Mexico en route to Vancouver, British Columbia.

Weinmann of Salem, Oregon enlisted in the Navy on July 1, 2003. At the time he deserted he was assigned to USS Albuquerque, a Los Angeles-class attack submarine. He deserted in July 2005, while his submarine was in port in Groton, Connecticut.

Petty Officer Weinmann is the only known member of the United States Military convicted of espionage where the United States Government has refused to release the identity of the state the accused is convicted of spying for. This is normally the first fact that is released to the public.

Espionage is defined by the military as providing classified information to a foreign country. There have been conflicting reports about which countries he is accused of spying for. During the trial the foreign country was referred to as Country X and has never been identified, citing security concerns.

== Court proceedings ==
When his arrest was made public it was claimed he had been held in secret for four months.

A docket listing Weinmann's preliminary hearing (Article 32) was never produced nor would the Navy confirm when the hearing was held. Officials have refused to produce a charge sheet which would detail the accusations against the sailor. Theodore Brown, a spokesman for Fleet Forces Command, stated that Weinmann is charged with failure to obey orders and acts prejudicial to good order and discipline in addition to espionage and desertion.

In military courts, an order must be issued closing or sealing a case. Brown acknowledged that "there is no order," but said that the charge sheet in the Weinmann case would not be released.

In December 2006 Weinmann was sentenced by a military court-martial at Naval Station Norfolk to 12 years in prison and a dishonorable discharge for desertion and turning over classified information to a foreign agent. Judge Capt. Daniel O'Toole handed down a 25-year term, but was forced by a plea agreement to suspend 13 years. Weinmann was represented by attorneys Phillip Stackhouse, Lt. Cmdr. Karen Somers and Lt. William Tansey. The Navy removed Lt. Tansey from the defense after Mr. Stackhouse was brought on board.

At his court martial Weinmann read a statement prepared for him admitting that he obtained classified data, including biographies of Austrian government employees and technical manuals on the Tomahawk cruise missile, while serving aboard the Albuquerque in 2005. He fled to Vienna, Austria, and hoped the Austrian government would be interested in the dossiers being collected by U.S. intelligence agencies. He contemplated trading the dossiers for asylum but abandoned that plan and instead turned over Tomahawk manuals to a foreign agent at a Vienna embassy. Weinmann said he had hoped to exchange the information for a new life in another country.
