= USS Annapolis (SSN-760) =

Los Angeles-class nuclear-powered attack submarine of the US Navy

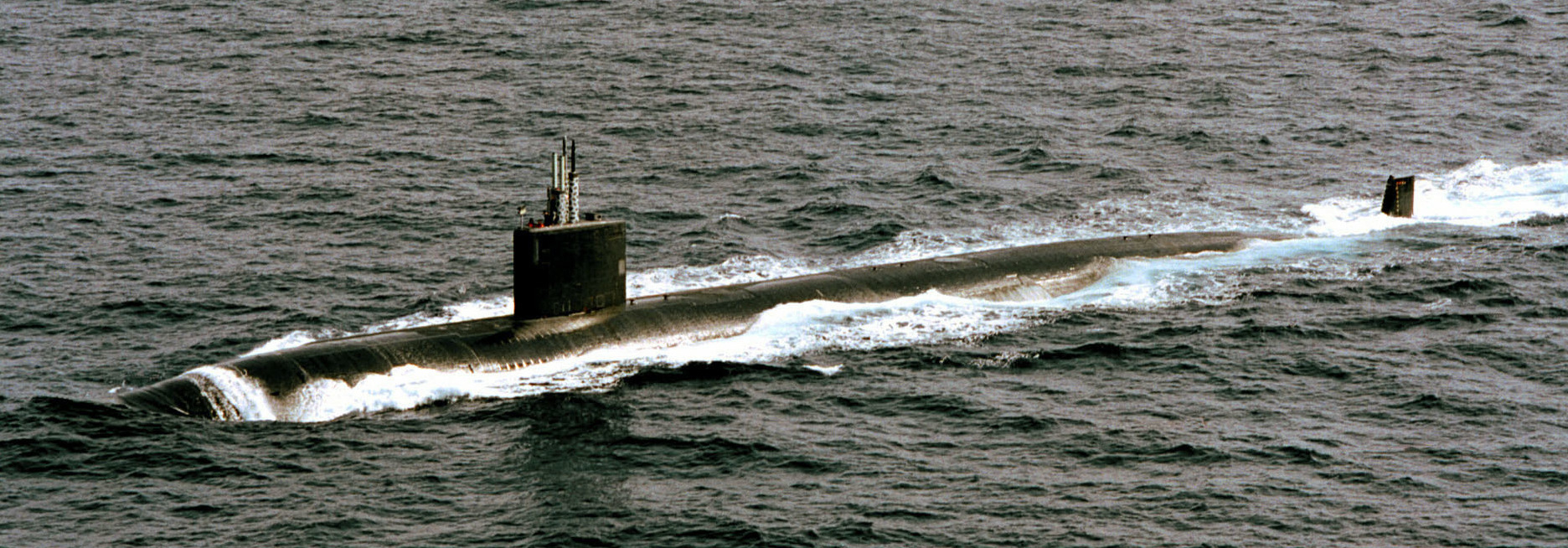
- USS Annapolis (SSN-760)

History

United States
- Name: USS Annapolis
- Namesake: Annapolis, Maryland
- Awarded: 21 March 1986
- Builder: General Dynamics Electric Boat
- Laid down: 15 June 1988
- Launched: 18 May 1991
- Sponsored by: Mrs. Myra F. Kauderer
- Commissioned: 11 April 1992
- Home port: Naval Base Guam
- Motto: Born Free, Hope to Die Free
- Status: in active service
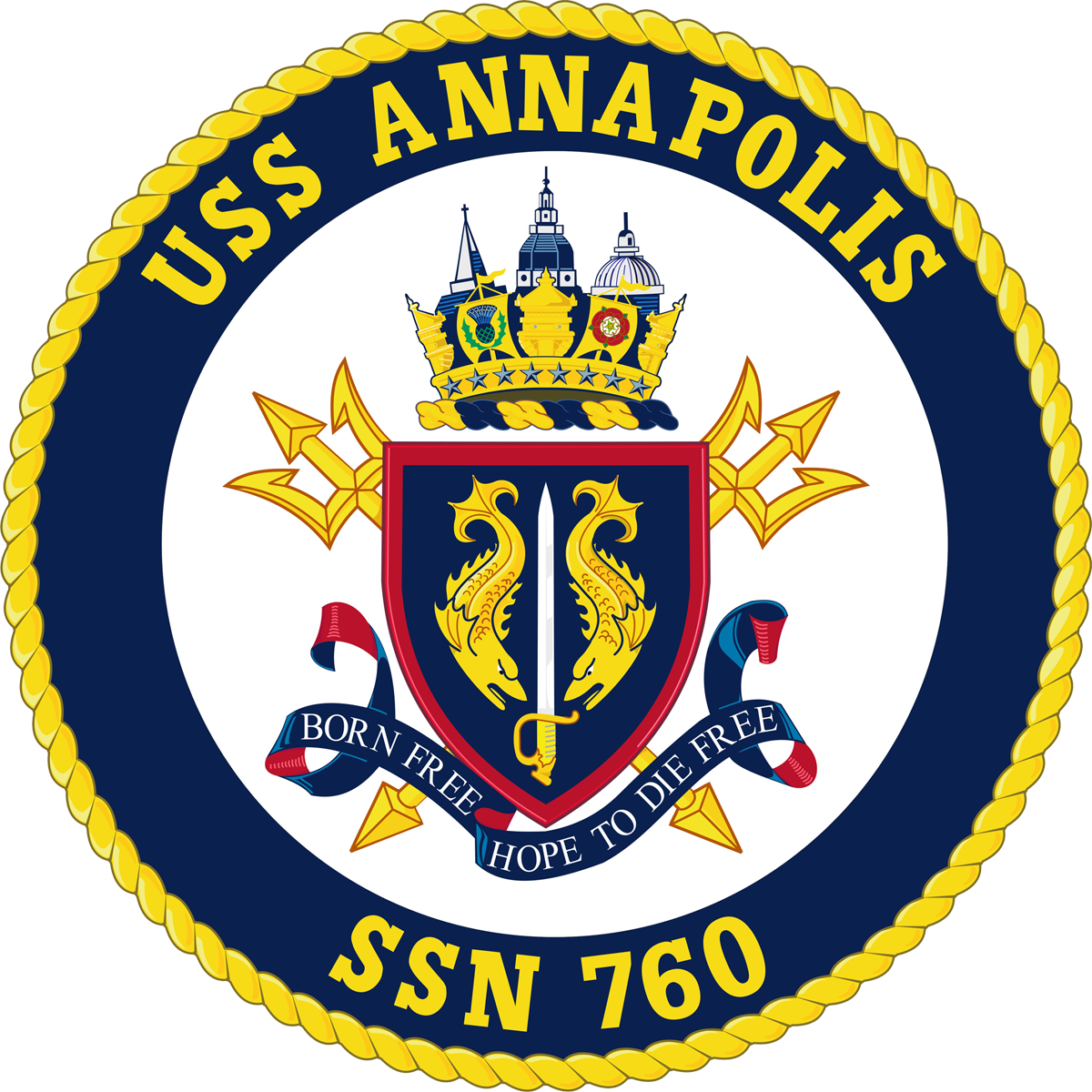
- Badge

General characteristics
- Class & type: Los Angeles-class submarine
- Displacement: 6,000 long tons (6,096 t) light (surfaced); 6,927 long tons (7,038 t) full (dived); 927 long tons (942 t) dead
- Length: 110.34 m (362 ft 0 in)
- Beam: 10.06 m (33 ft 0 in)
- Draft: 9.75 m (32 ft 0 in)
- Depth: 122 m (400 ft)
- Propulsion: 1 × S6G PWR nuclear reactor with D2W core (165 MW), HEU 93.5%; 2 × steam turbines (33,500) shp; 1 × shaft; 1 × secondary propulsion motor 325 hp (242 kW)
- Speed: 25 knots (46 km/h; 29 mph)+
- Complement: 12 officers, 115 men
- Sensors & processing systems: BQQ-10 Sonar; BPS-15 Surface Search Radar;
- Armament: 4 × 21 in (533 mm) torpedo tubes; 12 × Vertical Launch Tomahawk tubes; Mark 48 ADCAP torpedoes; Tomahawk missiles; CAPTOR mine

USS Annapolis (SSN-760), is the tenth "improved" Los Angeles-class submarine. Annapolis is the fourth ship of the United States Navy to be named for Annapolis, Maryland, site of the United States Naval Academy.

== History ==
The contract to build USS Annapolis (SSN-760) was awarded to the Electric Boat Division of General Dynamics Corporation in Groton, Connecticut on 21 March 1986 and her keel was laid down on 15 June 1988. She was launched on 18 May 1991 sponsored by Mrs. Myra F. Kauderer, and commissioned on 11 April 1992, with Commander Richard Severinghaus in command.

Completing sea trials in April 1992, the ship had her first port visit to her namesake city, Annapolis, Maryland. She then entered Post Shakedown Availability (PSA) in January 1993. After completing PSA in July 1993, the ship had her first port visit to Bermuda.

In November 1993, USS Annapolis deployed on her first mission to the North Atlantic. Later that year she was awarded the Submarine Group Two Silver Anchor Award for enlisted retention. Annapolis returned to Groton, Connecticut for the Christmas holidays and then continued on deployment in the North Atlantic in January 1994. During this time the boat made her first visit to Bergen, Norway where some members of the crew had an opportunity to attend a few of the 1994 Winter Olympics events, including the Men's Gold Medal hockey match, before returning to Groton in March. During this deployment the boat and crew earned the Navy Arctic Service Ribbon. Following an in-port refit period, Annapolis participated in a six-month pre-deployment workup with USS Dwight D. Eisenhower, and on 20 October 1994, began her first six-month Mediterranean Deployment with the Dwight D. Eisenhower Battle Group. During the deployment, the crew had a chance to make port calls in places as diverse as Gibraltar; Toulon, France; La Maddalena, Italy; Limasol, Cyprus; and Haifa, Israel. During this deployment Annapolis earned her first Sea Service Ribbon, Navy Expeditionary Medal and Meritorious Unit Commendation. Upon the boat's return, Annapolis was "adopted" by the town of Montville, Connecticut in an effort to strengthen community relations.

The boat's next deployment was not until October 1997, when she returned to the Mediterranean Sea with the George Washington Battle Group. In November 1997, in response to an emergent political and military crisis in the Persian Gulf, Annapolis transited the Suez Canal en route to the Middle East. While on station, Annapolis played a key role as a Tomahawk strike platform as well as serving as a public affairs platform by hosting news crews from both ABC and CBS networks.

Port calls were limited but the crew did get ashore in Abu Dhabi, United Arab Emirates and Bahrain. While in the Persian Gulf, the boat earned her second Sea Service Ribbon and a Naval Unit Commendation. In March 1998 Annapolis was relieved of her duties by USS Providence and began the long voyage home.

After more than two years of local operations and extensive upkeep, Annapolis transited back to the Mediterranean in the summer of 2000 for a six-month independent submarine deployment. While in the Mediterranean, the boat had a chance to participate in several multi-national exercises as well as in real-world operations in the Adriatic. Crew members had significant liberty in Gibraltar; Rota, Spain; Toulon, France; and La Maddalena, Italy, and earned its third Sea Service Ribbon and second Naval Expeditionary Medal. The boat returned from this deployment in January 2001.

Annapolis entered Portsmouth Naval Shipyard for an extended overhaul on 23 April 2003. She set sail 16 May 2004, after completing a Depot Modernization Period one month ahead of schedule.

On 28 February 2008, Annapolis returned to homeport Groton from a six-month deployment. The deployment included visits to Rota, Spain; Toulon and Brest, France; Praia, Cape Verde; and Ghana. Annapolis was the first U.S. submarine to make a port visit to Africa (Cape Verde) outside the Mediterranean. In addition to functions supporting national security, Annapolis participated in the African Partnership Station (APS) 2007, an initiative with regional maritime services in West and Central Africa.

In March 2009 Annapolis took part in Ice Exercise 2009.

In April 2015, the boat entered an Extended Engineered Overhaul where she went through several modernizations both in the forward compartment, as well as in the engineroom. The boat returned to Groton in June 2017.

In January 2018, the boat transited the Panama Canal for her change of homeport to Naval Base Point Loma in San Diego, CA.

In February 2018, she was homeported in San Diego, California, and assigned to Submarine Squadron 11.

Following a predeployment work up period, Annapolis set out on her maiden Western Pacific Deployment in March 2019. She made port in Yokosuka, Japan; Sasebo, Japan; and Guam. She returned to San Diego in September 2019.

In April 2022, she was homeported to Apra Harbor, Guam, and assigned to Submarine Squadron 15.
