= David Marquet =

United States Navy captain and author

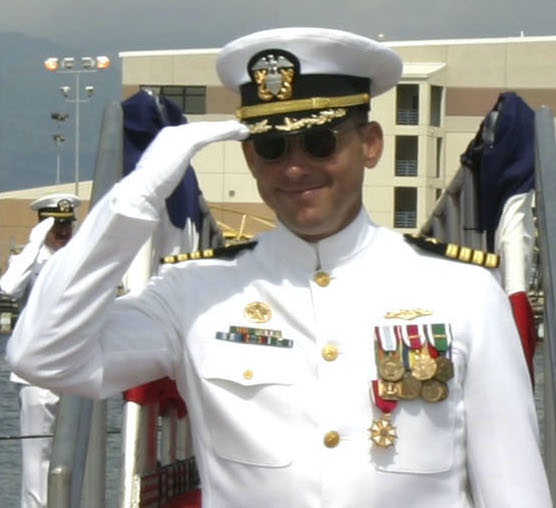
- Occupations: Naval officer, leadership coach
- Website: davidmarquet.com

L. David Marquet (/mɑːrˈkeɪ/ mar-KAY) is a retired United States Navy captain and the bestselling author of Turn the Ship Around! and Leadership is Language. He graduated from the United States Naval Academy in 1981. He was the engineer officer aboard the USS Will Rogers (SSBN-659), a nuclear powered ballistic missile submarine. In 1999, Marquet was selected to captain the USS Olympia (SSN-717), a nuclear powered attack submarine, but unexpectedly he was diverted to take command of the USS Santa Fe, when its captain quit. After being assigned to command the USS Santa Fe, then ranked last in retention and operational standing, he realized the traditional leadership approach of “take control, give orders,” would not work. He “turned his ship around” by treating the crew as leaders, not followers, and giving control, not taking control. This approach took the Santa Fe from “worst to first,” achieving the highest retention and operational standings in the Navy. After Marquet’s departure from the ship, the Santa Fe continued to win awards and promoted a disproportionate number of officers and enlisted men to positions of increased responsibility, including ten subsequent submarine captains. The submarine has continued to win awards. Soon after he became commander of the Submarine Squadron 3 until September 23, 2005.

Following his retirement in 2009, he began working as a leadership expert and speaking to audiences globally about creating workplaces where people are healthier and happier because they have more control over their work. He taught previously at the Columbia University School of Professional Studies.

== Bibliography ==
| Year | Title | ISBN |
|---|---|---|
| 2013 | Turn the Ship Around!: A True Story of Turning Followers into Leaders | 9781591846406 |
| 2020 | Leadership is Language: The Hidden Power of What You Say—and What You Don't | 9780241373668 |
| 2025 | Distancing: How Great Leaders Reframe to Make Better Decisions | 9780593713105 |

== Awards and decorations ==

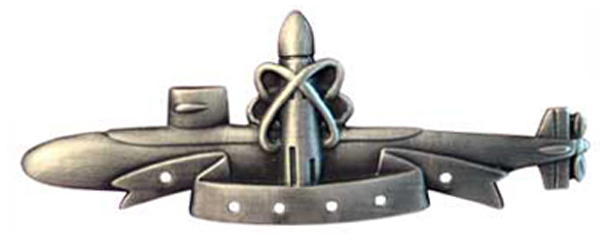

Submarine Warfare Officer Insignia
| Legion of Merit | | Defense Meritorious Service Medal |
| Meritorious Service Medal w/ three award stars | Navy and Marine Corps Commendation Medal w/ three award stars | Navy and Marine Corps Achievement Medal |
| Joint Meritorious Unit Award | Navy Meritorious Unit Commendation | Coast Guard Meritorious Unit Commendation |
| Navy Expeditionary Medal | National Defense Service Medal w/ bronze service star | Global War on Terrorism Service Medal |
| Humanitarian Service Medal | Navy Sea Service Deployment Ribbon with three bronze service stars | Navy Arctic Service Ribbon |
SSBN Deterrent Patrol insignia
Command at Sea insignia
