= USS Santa Fe (SSN-763) =

Los Angeles-class nuclear-powered attack submarine of the US Navy

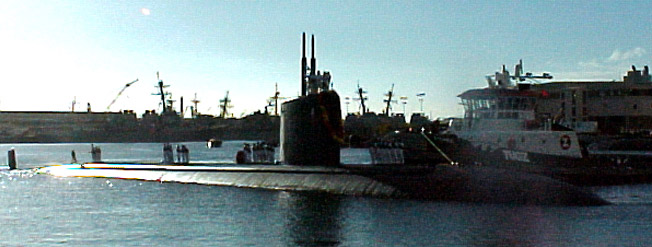
- USS Santa Fe (SSN-763)

History

United States
- Name: USS Santa Fe
- Namesake: The City of Santa Fe, New Mexico
- Awarded: 21 March 1986
- Builder: General Dynamics Electric Boat
- Laid down: 9 July 1991
- Launched: 12 December 1992
- Sponsored by: Joy Johnson
- Commissioned: 8 January 1994
- Home port: Naval Base Point Loma
- Identification: MMSI number: 369970220; Callsign: NSFE
- Status: In active service

General characteristics
- Class & type: Los Angeles-class submarine
- Displacement: 6,000 long tons (6,096 t) light; 6,927 long tons (7,038 t) full; 927 long tons (942 t) dead
- Length: 110.3 m (361 ft 11 in)
- Beam: 10 m (32 ft 10 in)
- Draft: 9.4 m (30 ft 10 in)
- Propulsion: 1 × S6G PWR nuclear reactor with D2W core (165 MW), HEU 93.5%; 2 × steam turbines (33,500) shp; 1 × shaft; 1 × secondary propulsion motor 325 hp (242 kW)
- Speed: Surfaced:20 knots (23 mph; 37 km/h); Submerged: +20 knots (23 mph; 37 km/h) (official)
- Complement: 12 officers, 98 men
- Sensors & processing systems: BSY-1/BQQ-10 passive sonar, BQS-15 detecting and ranging sonar, WLR-8 fire control radar receiver, WLR-9 acoustic receiver for detection of active search sonar and acoustic homing torpedoes, BRD-7 radio direction finder
- Armament: 4 × 21 in (533 mm) bow tubes, 10 Mk48 ADCAP torpedo reloads, Tomahawk land attack missile block 3 SLCM range 1,700 nautical miles (3,100 km), Harpoon anti–surface ship missile range 70 nautical miles (130 km), mine laying Mk67 mobile Mk60 captor mines

USS Santa Fe (SSN-763), a Los Angeles-class submarine, is the second ship of the United States Navy to be named for Santa Fe, New Mexico. The contract to build her was awarded to the Electric Boat Division of General Dynamics Corporation in Groton, Connecticut on 21 March 1986 and her keel was laid down on 9 July 1991. She was launched on 12 December 1992 sponsored by Mrs. Joy Johnson, and commissioned on 8 January 1994, with Commander Rodger P. Krull in command.

== Operational history ==
Santa Fe's maiden deployment was in 1997 to the Persian Gulf and Western Pacific. In 1998, she completed a Selected Restricted Availability in Pearl Harbor Naval Shipyard. In 1999, she was again deployed to the Persian Gulf and Western Pacific earning a Meritorious Unit Commendation and Coast Guard Meritorious Unit Commendation. In 2001, she deployed to the Western Pacific and Persian Gulf earning two Meritorius Unit Commendations as well as earning her first coveted CSS-7 Battle E.

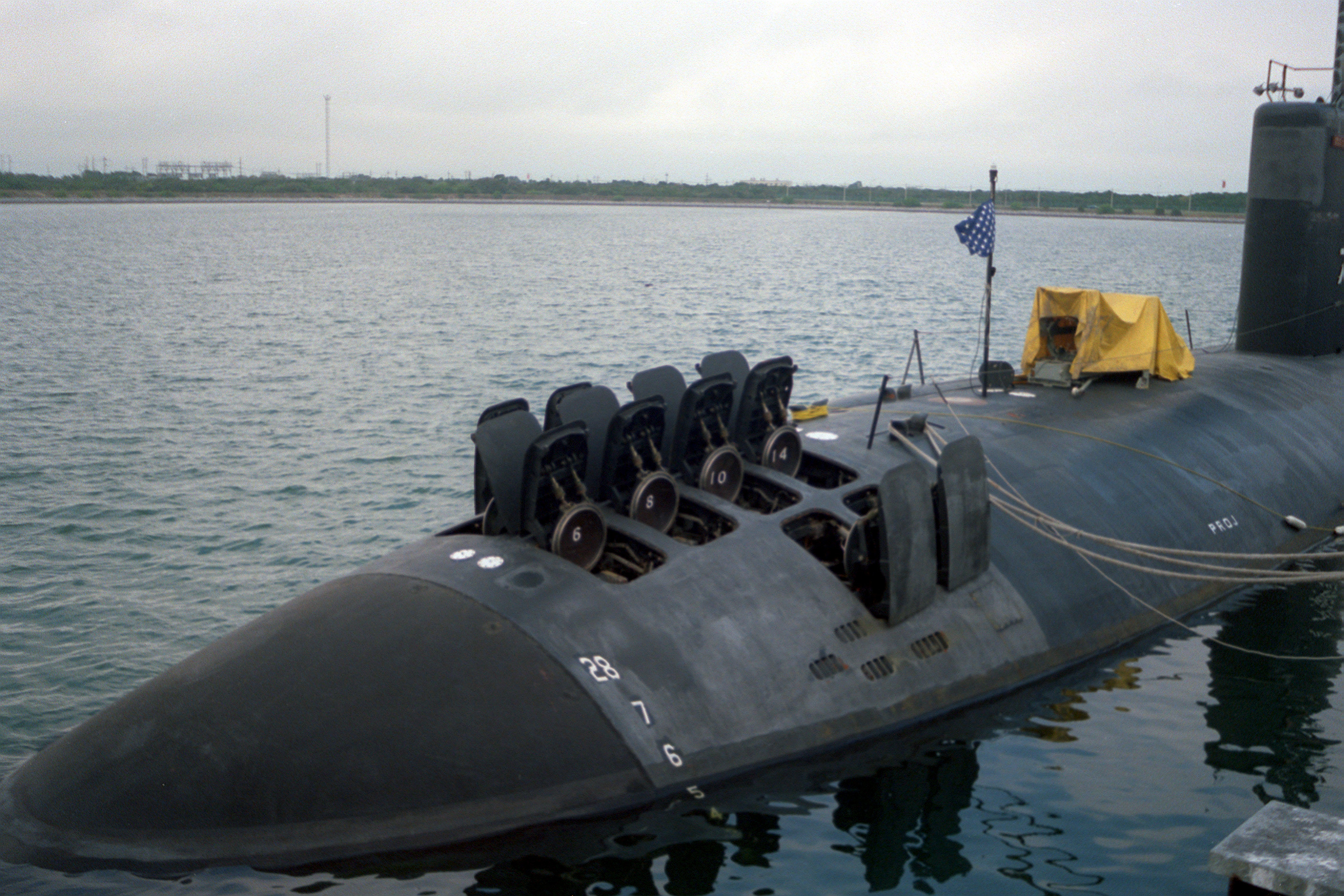
A portside bow view of the fore section of Santa Fe tied up at the pier in February 1994. The doors of the Mark 36 vertical launch system for the Tomahawk missiles are in the "open" position.

Santa Fe deployed to the Western Pacific in September 2003 until March 2004. For this deployment she participated in ANNUALEX '03 with the Japanese Maritime Defense Force. The ship made port calls in Singapore, Guam, multiple times in Sasebo, Japan, and in Yokosuka, Japan in which she rode out a typhoon while in port. Santa Fe was awarded the Navy Unit Commendation, the second highest award given to a submarine, for actions completed on this deployment. She underwent a three-month Interim drydocking in October 2004.

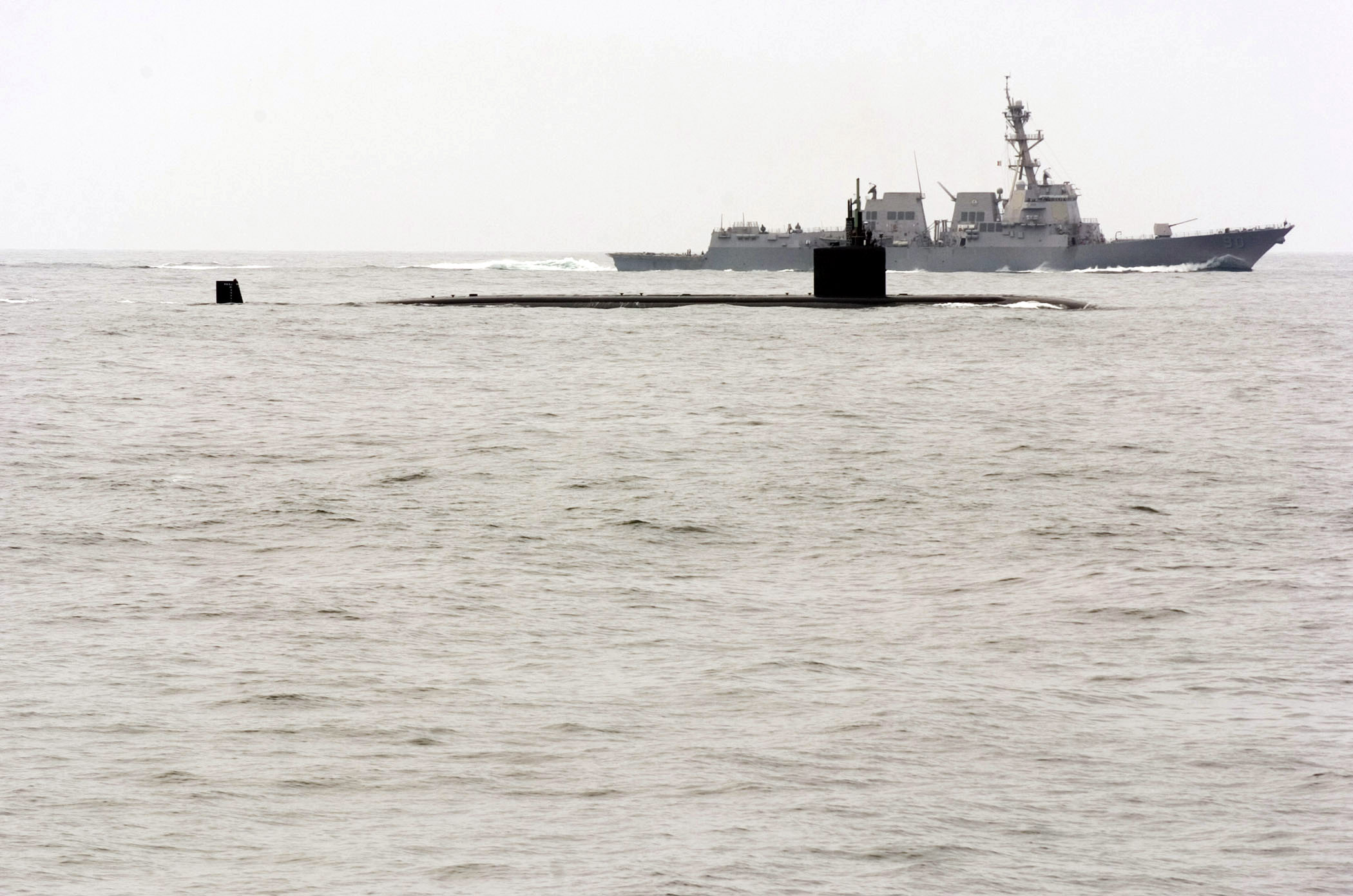
Santa Fe sails with the destroyer Chafee, 28 September 2005.

After the ship completed sea trials and other various workups she then completed a two-month Eastern Pacific Deployment that started in May 2005. After returning to her homeport of Pearl Harbor in June 2005, she again deployed to the Western Pacific on 9 August 2005. During this deployment she participated in Exercise Malabar with the Indian Navy. Santa Fe was the second U.S. nuclear submarine to participate in the exercise and also to port in Goa, India. After Malabar, the ship made a brief stop in Phuket, Thailand. She was the first U.S. submarine to visit Phuket since 2001. The ship returned to Pearl Harbor in February 2006. She made the transit to the East Coast in July 2006, surfacing near the North Pole on the way and stopping in Brest, France.

After shipyard she completed a six-month Western Pacific deployment from May–November 2009, after stops in Singapore, Saipan, Guam, Okinawa, JP, and Yokosuka, JP. She received the Battle "E" Award in January 2010.

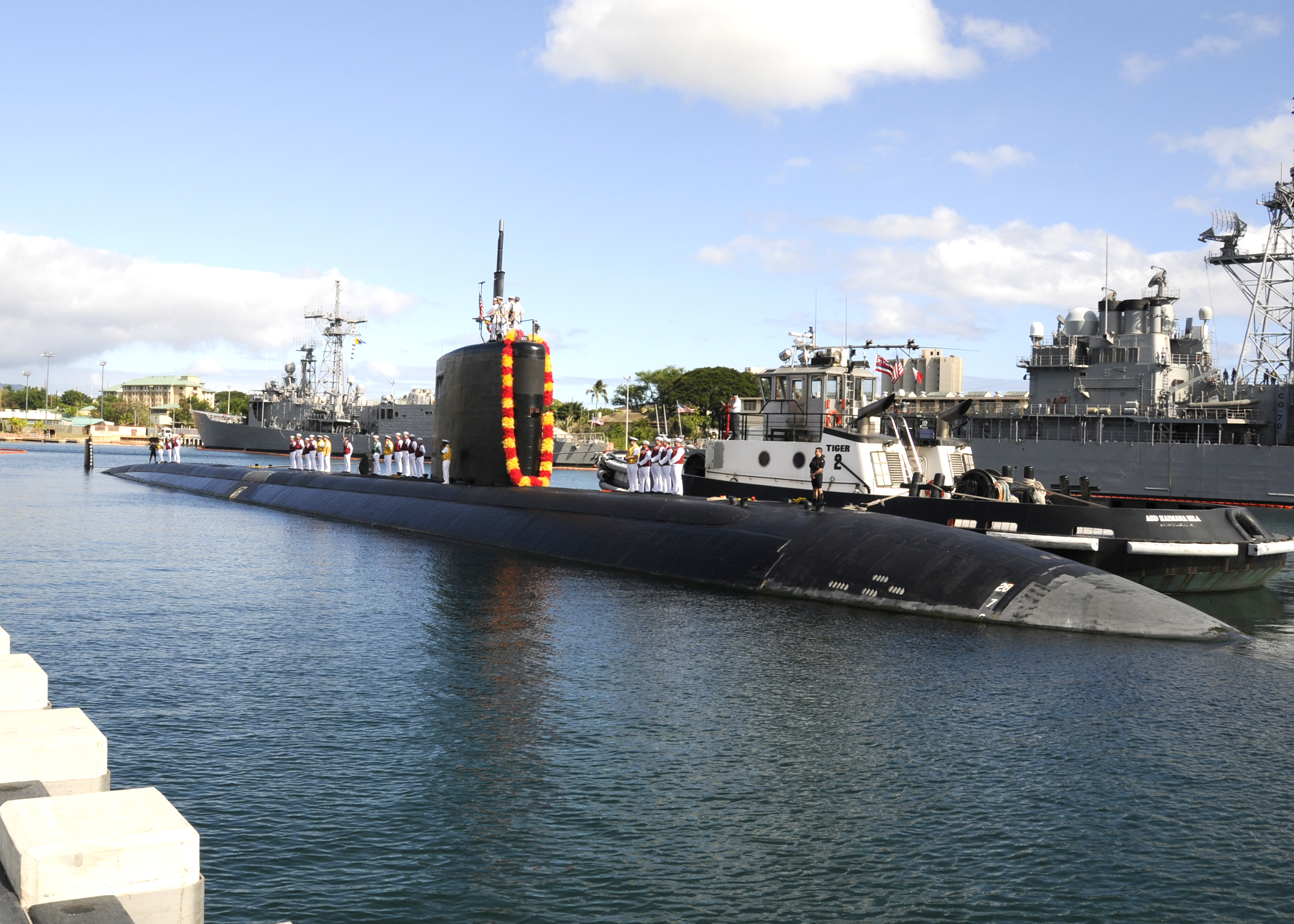
Santa Fe homecoming, 24 August 2011.

Santa Fe returned 24 August 2011 to Joint Base Pearl Harbor–Hickam after successfully completing a six-month deployment to the western Pacific region. During this deployment Santa Fe conducted four operations of great importance to national security by safely operating in a demanding and challenging undersea environment, directly enhancing fleet, theater and national objectives. Santa Fe's tactical acumen was further displayed by their successful participation in their second Exercise Malabar, a bilateral exercise with the Indian navy, in 2011. Port calls included Sasebo, Japan (x3), Chinhae, South Korea; Yokosuka, Japan; Guam, and Subic Bay, Philippines. In recognition of their outstanding performance, Santa Fe received the COMSUBRON 7 Battle "E" Award and was awarded the Navy Unit Commendation by the Secretary of the Navy.

== Awards ==
- 2000 – Arleigh Burke Fleet Trophy for most improved ship in the Fleet.
- 2001 – Marjorie Sterrett Battleship Fund Award
- 2001, 2004, 2009, and 2011, 2015 – COMSUBRON 7 Battle Efficiency "E" Award.
- 2003, 2012 – Navy Unit Commendation by the SECNAV (2nd highest award that can be given to a Naval vessel)
- 2006 – Navy Meritorious Unit Commendation
- 2019 - Edward F. Ney Award

== See also ==
- David Marquet (former captain)
