= USS Hampton (SSN-767) =

Los Angeles-class nuclear-powered attack submarine of the US Navy

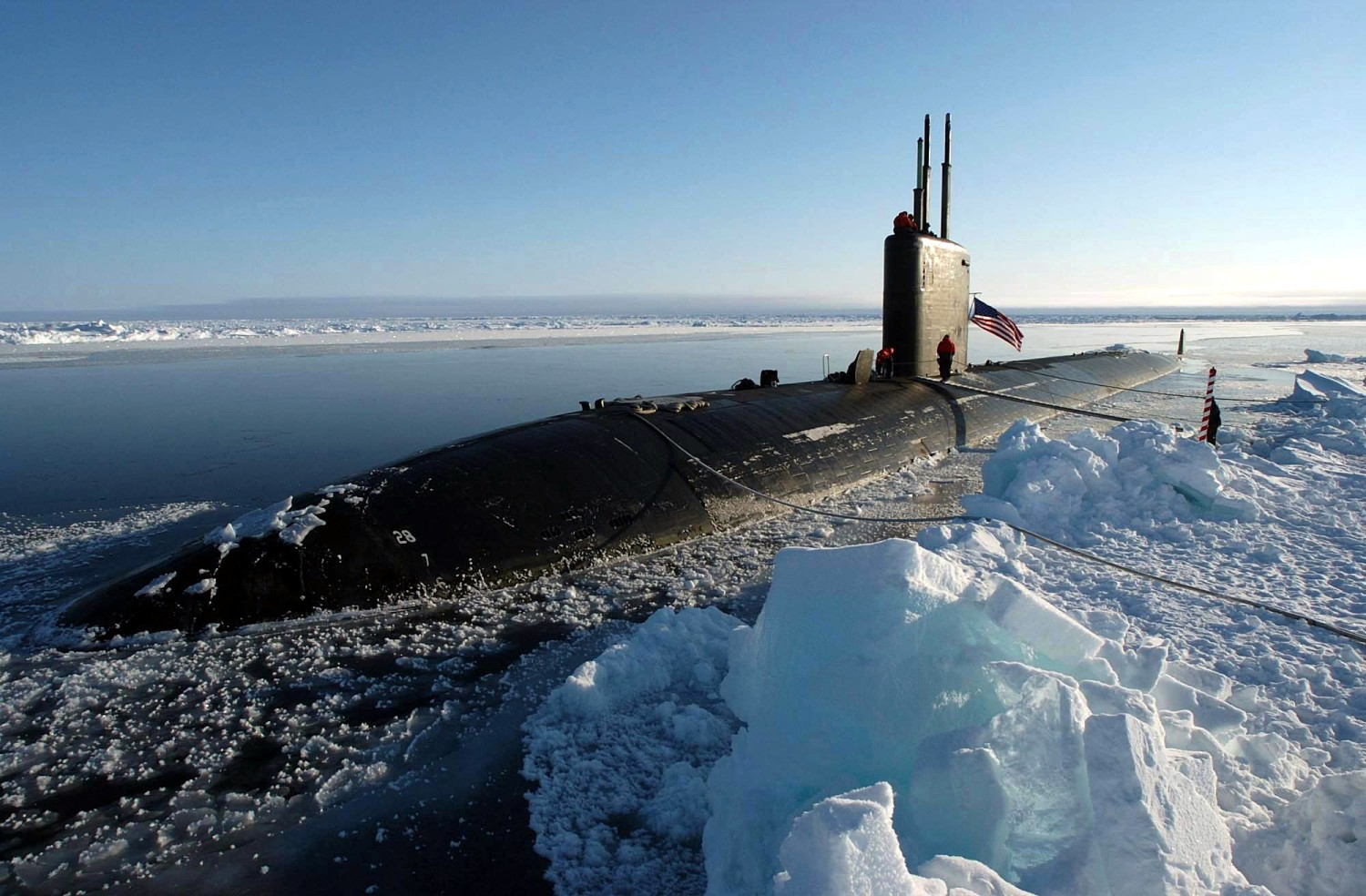
- USS Hampton (SSN-767)

History

United States
- Name: USS Hampton
- Namesake: The cities of Hampton, Virginia; Hampton, Iowa; Hampton, South Carolina; and Hampton, New Hampshire (Note: Despite wording used by the Navy, of the communities the Hampton is named for, only the one in Virginia is a city, the other three are towns.)
- Awarded: 6 February 1987
- Builder: Newport News Shipbuilding and Drydock Company
- Laid down: 2 March 1990
- Launched: 3 April 1992
- Sponsored by: Mrs. Laura Bateman
- Commissioned: 6 November 1993
- Home port: Naval Base Point Loma
- Motto: "Qui Desiderant Pacem Preparate Bellum"(Latin); "Those who desire peace prepare for war" -Vegetius, Book 3 of De Re Militari
- Status: in active service
- Notes: Recertified for operations as of December 2007
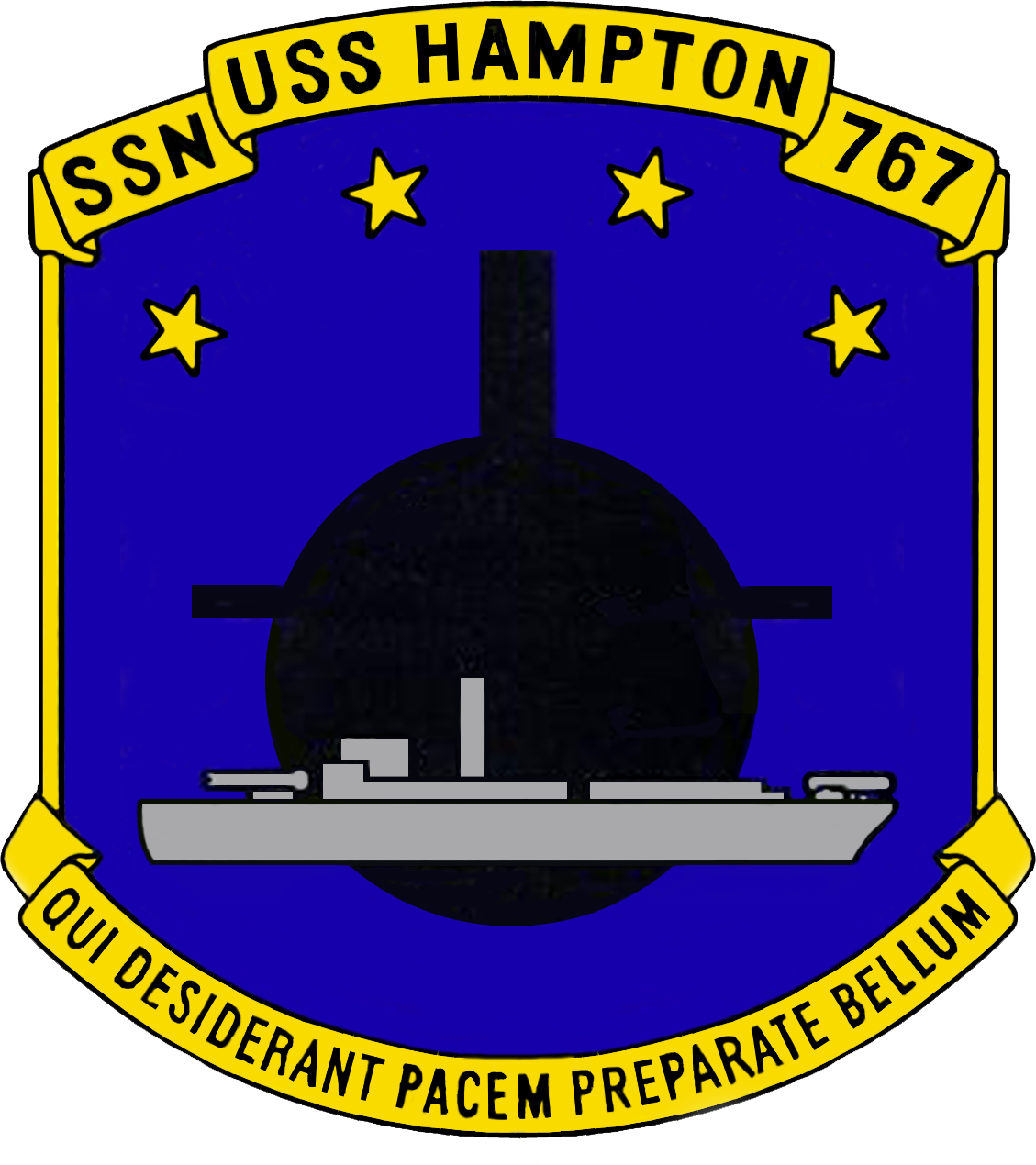
- Badge

General characteristics
- Class & type: Los Angeles-class submarine
- Displacement: 6,000 long tons (6,096 t) light; 6,927 long tons (7,038 t) full; 927 long tons (942 t) dead
- Length: 110.3 m (361 ft 11 in)
- Beam: 10 m (32 ft 10 in)
- Draft: 9.4 m (30 ft 10 in)
- Propulsion: 1 × S6G PWR nuclear reactor with D2W core (165 MW), HEU 93.5%; 2 × steam turbines (33,500) shp; 1 × shaft; 1 × secondary propulsion motor 325 hp (242 kW)
- Complement: 12 officers, 98 men
- Armament: 4 × 21 in (533 mm) torpedo tubes; 12 × vertical launch Tomahawk missiles

USS Hampton (SSN-767), a Los Angeles-class submarine, is the fourth ship of the United States Navy to bear this name. The earlier Hamptons were given their names for varying reasons, but SSN-767 was specifically named for four cities: Hampton, Virginia; Hampton, Iowa; Hampton, South Carolina; and Hampton, New Hampshire. There are at least 20 communities named "Hampton" (including cities, towns, and unincorporated communities) in the United States.

== History ==
The contract to build the Hampton was awarded to the Newport News Shipbuilding and Dry Dock Company in Newport News, Virginia (adjacent to the aforementioned Hampton, Virginia) on 6 February 1987, and her keel was laid down on 2 March 1990. She was launched on 3 April 1992, sponsored by Mrs. Laura Bateman, wife of U.S. Representative Herb Bateman, and she was commissioned on 6 November 1993, with Commander David Antanitus in command.

In late April 2004 Hampton along with HMS Tireless (S88) surfaced through the ice together at the North Pole.

In February 2007, Hampton left Naval Station Norfolk for a seven-month Western Pacific (WESTPAC) deployment. She traveled through the Panama Canal and arrived in Yokosuka, Japan. She completed two missions of national importance, and participated in two major, multinational naval exercises. She made port visits in Apra Harbor, Guam, White Beach, Okinawa, and Brisbane, Australia, as well as a brief stop in Pearl Harbor, Hawaii, before arriving in San Diego. She earned the Navy Expeditionary Medal during this time.

On 17 September 2007, the Hampton's homeport was changed from Naval Station Norfolk to Naval Base Point Loma of San Diego, in a change from the Atlantic Fleet to the Pacific Fleet.

Hampton completed a Western Pacific deployment from 17 October 2008 to 17 April 2009. She made port visits to Singapore, Yokosuka, Japan, Saipan, and Apra Harbor, Guam, before returning to home port in San Diego. She participated in the first submarine exercise between the United States and the Singapore Navy.

In 2010 and 2011, the Hampton won the Submarine Squadron 11 Battle Efficiency award. On 15 May 2011, the submarine visited Hong Kong.

From March through October 2014, under the command of Commander Lincoln Reifsteck, Hampton traveled 41,000 nautical miles (47,000 mi; 76,000 km) on deployment while visiting Okinawa, Japan; Yokosuka, Japan; Sasebo, Japan; and Guam.

On 21 November 2024, under the command of Commander Grant Wanier, Hampton arrived at Portsmouth Naval Shipyard for "system upgrades and scheduled maintenance work." On 13 August 2025, while at Portsmouth Naval Shipyard, a small fire that broke out outside the submarine was quickly extinguished, although one person was injured.

=== Falsified records incident ===
In October 2007, six naval personnel were disciplined after they "neither maintained inspection records nor conducted the required inspection of the chemical levels associated with the cooling system" of the nuclear propulsion plant of the Hampton. Shortly thereafter, the ship's commanding officer, Commander Michael B. Portland, was relieved of his command due to a loss of confidence in his leadership; at the time, he was not charged with any offense.

In March 2008, the US Navy revealed that a total of 11 officers and enlisted men had been disciplined in connection with the fraudulent documentation and for cheating on qualification tests. In addition to the captain, the submarine's engineer officer, the engineering department master chief petty officer, and the entire reactor laboratory division were dismissed from Naval nuclear plant duty and submarine service. No damage was discovered in the reactor core and the submarine returned to operational status.

== Image gallery ==
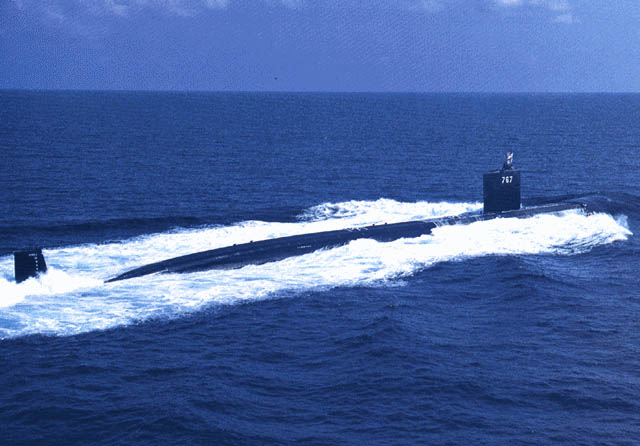
USS Hampton

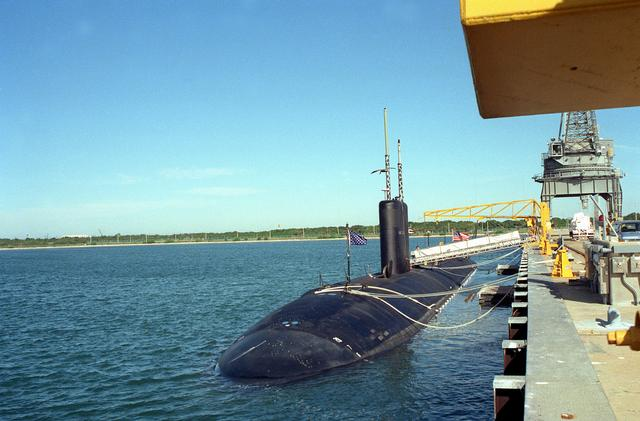
Hampton seen in Florida in 1993

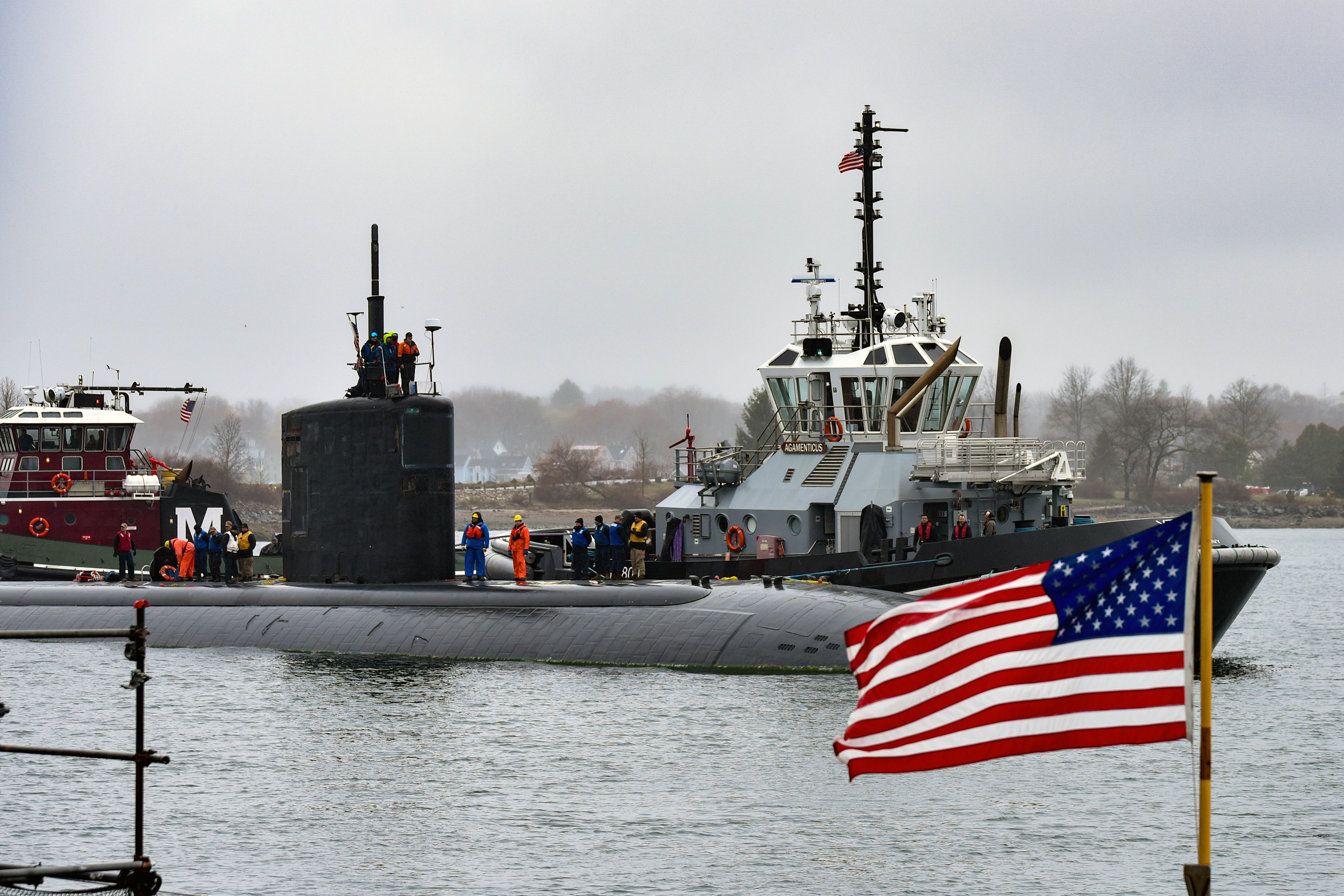
Hampton arriving at Portsmouth Naval Shipyard in November 2024
