= Operational Reactor Safeguard Examination =

US Navy systems exam

An Operational Reactor Safeguards Examination (ORSE) is an examination conducted by United States Navy personnel onboard U.S. Navy nuclear-powered ships. The purpose of an ORSE is to ensure that the Engineering (submarines) or Reactor (aircraft carriers) department of a nuclear-powered vessel is operating their reactor(s) in a safe manner. The exam also ensures the readiness of the ship's engineering or reactor department to safely respond to nuclear power plant casualties.

The ORSE board is made up of three Junior Board Members, usually prior Engineers, and a Senior Board Member (a prior Commanding Officer) Nuclear Propulsion Examining Board, or NPEB.

== Typical Schedule ==
An ORSE is scheduled during an underway period. There are a few surprise ORSE's when the boat or ship is given only a few days of notice. The first task of the ORSE board is to review all of the ship's records from the date of the most recent ORSE. During the review of records, the engineering department takes a written exam. After the review, a battery of intense simulation drills will begin. On submarines, each of the 3 watch sections stands one drill watch, is casualty assistance team for another, and finally drill monitors for a third. After the drills, oral interviews test the department's level of knowledge. Additionally, there are monitored evolutions to evaluate the department's ability to perform selected maintenance items. A typical ORSE lasts for 3 days.

== Purpose ==
The purpose of ORSE is to ensure that a ship's engineering or reactor department can respond to any casualty, and is properly following all procedures for operating and maintaining the propulsion plant.

== Anecdotal Quotes ==
"It gets better after ORSE." - This is a cliche statement expressed by those in Reactor/Engineering department. The intent is to provide hope that the extra stress is temporary and that the quality of life will improve after ORSE. As ORSE is a reoccurring audit, the quality of life does not in fact change. Similar to a seafood restaurant's permanent advertisement for "Free Crabs Tomorrow!", tomorrow never arrives.
