= Arco (ARDM-5) =

Auxiliary floating drydock

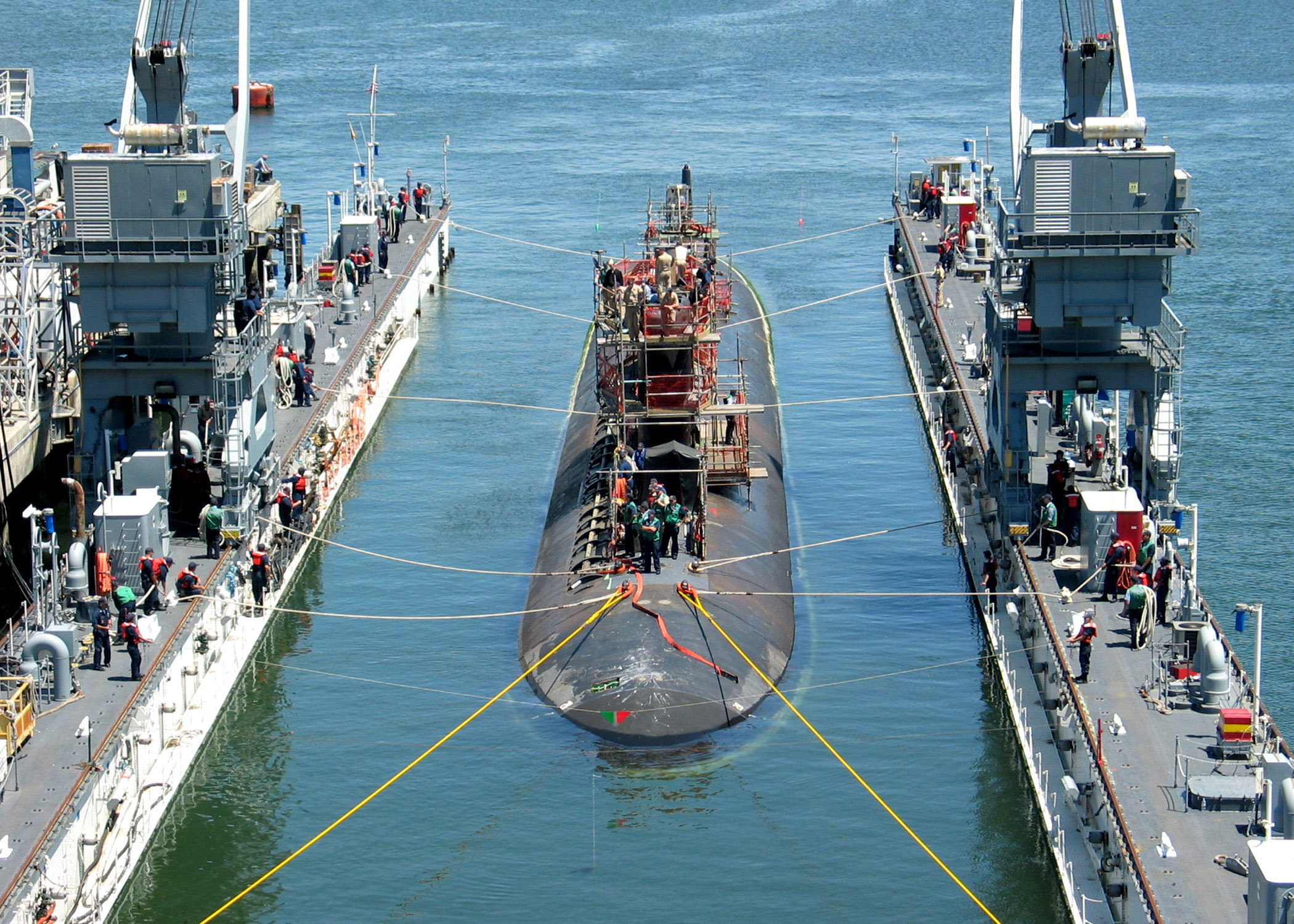
- Los Angeles-class submarine USS Asheville (SSN-758) enters the floating dry dock Arco (ARDM-5) for scheduled maintenance in 2007.

History

United States
- Namesake: Arco, Idaho
- Operator: United States Navy
- Awarded: 13 October 1982
- Builder: Todd Pacific Shipyards
- Laid down: 9 May 1983
- Launched: 14 December 1984
- In service: 23 June 1986
- Home port: San Diego, California
- Motto: Our Hands Preserve
- Honors and awards: National Defense Service Medal; Navy E Ribbon (Awarded 17 times)
- Status: Active
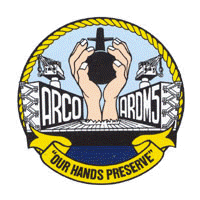
- Badge

General characteristics
- Class & type: ARDM-5-class
- Displacement: 5,400 tons
- Length: 492 ft (150 m)
- Beam: 96 ft (29 m)
- Height: 61 ft (19 m)
- Complement: 5 officer, 125 enlisted

Arco (ARDM-5) is an ARDM-5-class Medium Auxiliary floating drydock for repair and serviced the United States Navy.

Arco was laid down on 9 May 1983 by Todd Pacific Shipyards in Seattle, Washington, and launched on 14 December 1984. She was placed in service on 23 June 1986 at Naval Base San Diego. She provides dry dock services for the nuclear-powered submarines of Submarine Squadron Eleven in the Pacific, as well as other small craft.

== Sources ==
- Arco's official homepage
- DANFS: Arco
- Navy Register ARCO (ARDM 5)
- Photo gallery of Arco (ARDM-5) at NavSource Naval History
