= USS Olympia (SSN-717) =

Los Angeles-class nuclear-powered attack submarine of the US Navy

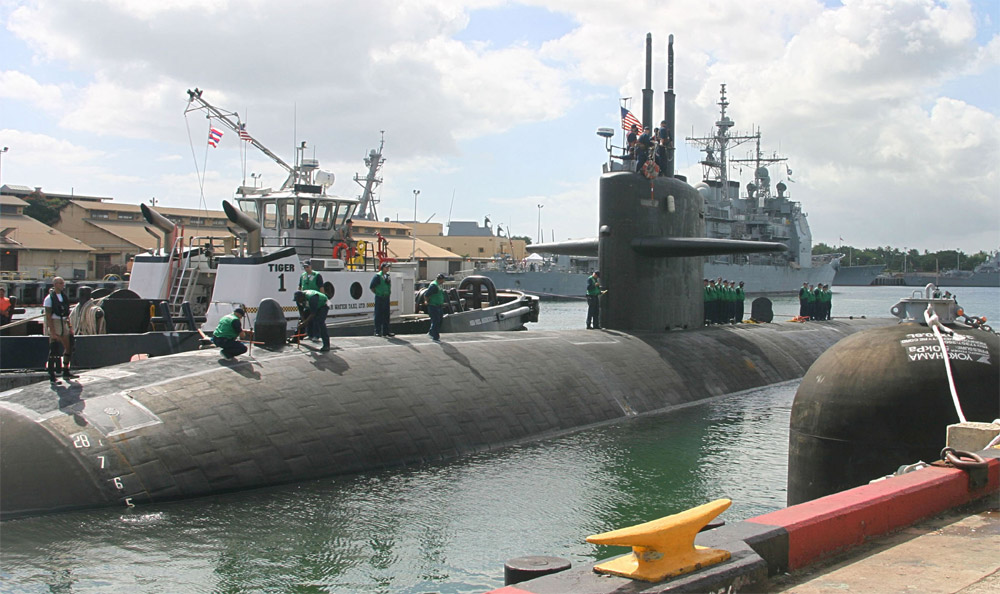

History

United States
- Name: USS Olympia
- Namesake: City of Olympia
- Awarded: 15 September 1977
- Builder: Newport News Shipbuilding and Dry Dock Company, Newport News, Virginia, U.S.
- Laid down: 31 March 1981
- Launched: 30 April 1983
- Commissioned: 17 November 1984
- Decommissioned: 5 February 2021
- Out of service: 6 August 2020
- Home port: Pearl Harbor
- Motto: Este Paratus; ("We Are Ready")
- Status: Inactive
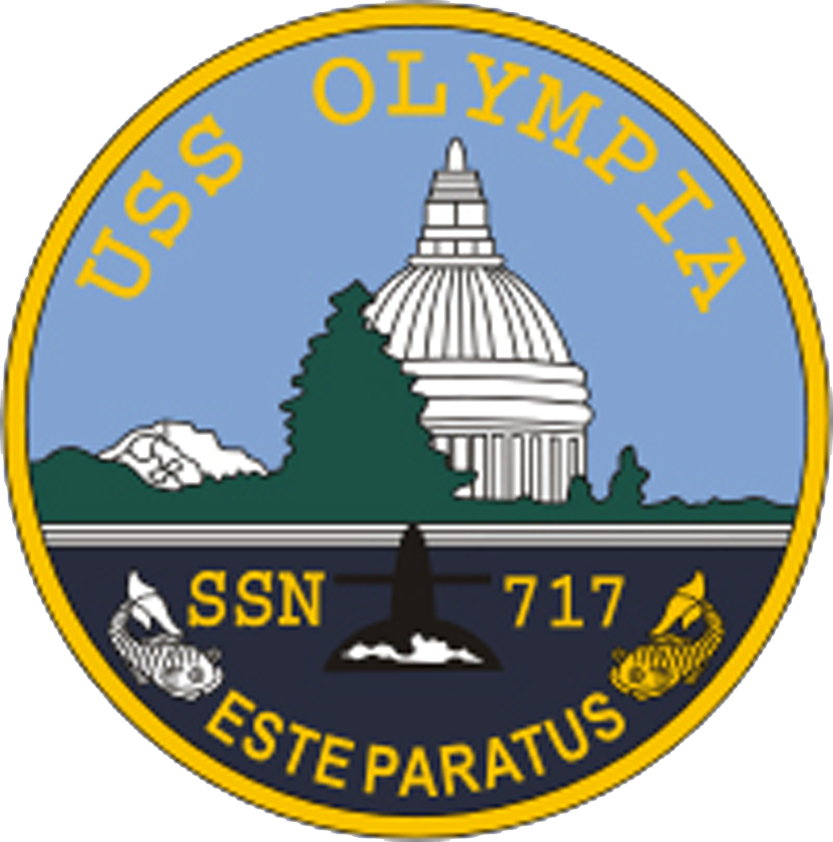
- Badge

General characteristics
- Class & type: Los Angeles-class submarine
- Displacement: 5,763 long tons (5,855 t) surfaced; 6,130 long tons (6,228 t) submerged; 6,136,730 long tons (6,235,206 t) dead
- Length: 362 ft (110.3 m)
- Beam: 33 ft (10 m)
- Draft: 32 ft (9.8 m)
- Propulsion: S6G reactor
- Complement: 12 officers, 98 men
- Armament: 4 × 21 in (533 mm) torpedo tubes

USS Olympia (SSN-717) is a Los Angeles-class submarine of the United States Navy. She is the 30th Los Angeles class nuclear powered fast attack submarine.

== Etymology ==
Olympia is the second ship of the U.S. Navy to be named for Olympia, Washington.

== History ==
The contract to build her was awarded to Newport News Shipbuilding and Dry Dock Company in Newport News, Virginia on 15 September 1977 and her keel was laid down on 31 March 1981. She was launched on 30 April 1983 sponsored by Mrs. Dorothy Williams, and commissioned on 17 November 1984.

Olympia was assigned to Submarine Squadron 7 (SUBRON SEVEN) and was homeported in Pearl Harbor, Hawaii.

In 1998, Olympia became the first Pacific-based submarine to pass through the Suez Canal in over 35 years.

== O'Kane cribbage board ==
When USS Bremerton (SSN-698) became inactive in August 2018, Olympia became the oldest commissioned attack submarine in active service in the Pacific Fleet. Keeping with a tradition that dates back to World War II, Richard O'Kane's cribbage board was transferred from Bremerton to Olympia's wardroom. When Olympia transferred to Puget Sound Naval Shipyard for decommissioning on 29 October 2019, the board was then transferred to the wardroom of USS Chicago (SSN-721), which was then the oldest active fast attack submarine in the Pacific Fleet. USS Providence (SSN-719) is the oldest fast attack submarine in active service, but currently assigned to the Atlantic Fleet.

== Inactivation and decommissioning ==
Olympia arrived in Bremerton, Washington on October 31, 2019, for inactivation and decommissioning. She was officially placed in reserve status, inactivated but in commission on August 6, 2020 and decommissioned on February 5, 2021. Like all other recent U.S. submarines, the vessel will be recycled via the Navy's Ship-Submarine Recycling Program.

== Awards ==
- Navy Unit Commendation
- Meritorious Unit Commendation
- National Defense Service Medal with star
- Global War on Terrorism Service Medal
- Sea Service Deployment Ribbon
- Engineering Excellence
- Deck Seamanship Award
- Silver Anchor Award
- Battle "E"
