= Richard O'Kane =

US Navy admiral and Medal of Honor recipient (1911–1994)

Richard Hetherington O'Kane
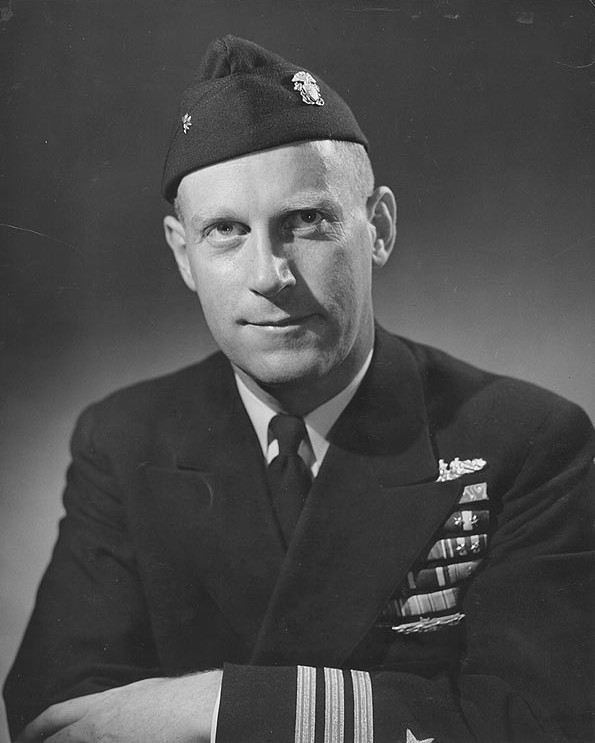
- Commander Richard O'Kane, c. 1946
- Born: February 2, 1911; Dover, New Hampshire, U.S.
- Died: February 16, 1994 (aged 83); Petaluma, California, U.S.
- Burial place: Arlington National Cemetery
- Spouse: Ernestine Groves
- Military career
- Allegiance: United States
- Branch: United States Navy
- Service years: 1931–1957
- Rank: Rear Admiral
- Commands: Submarine Squadron Seven; USS Sperry; Submarine Division 32; USS Pelias; USS Tang
- Conflicts: World War II
- Awards: Medal of Honor; Navy Cross (3); Silver Star (3); Legion of Merit; Purple Heart; Navy Commendation Ribbon

Richard Hetherington O'Kane (February 2, 1911 – February 16, 1994) was a United States Navy submarine commander in World War II, who was awarded the Medal of Honor for commanding USS Tang in the Pacific War against Japan to the most successful record of any United States submarine ever. He also received three Navy Crosses and three Silver Stars, for a total of seven awards of the United States military's three highest decorations for valor in combat. Before commanding Tang, O'Kane served in the highly successful USS Wahoo as executive officer and approach officer under noted Commander Dudley "Mush" Morton. In his ten combat patrols, five in Wahoo and five commanding Tang, O'Kane participated in more successful attacks on Japanese shipping than any other submarine officer during the war.

== Early life and education ==
O'Kane was born in Dover, New Hampshire, on February 2, 1911. He was the youngest of four children of University of New Hampshire entomology professor Walter Collins O'Kane, of Irish ancestry, and his wife, Clifford Hetherington. O'Kane graduated from Phillips Academy, Andover in 1930 and the United States Naval Academy in May 1934, upon which he was commissioned an officer in the United States Navy.

== Naval career ==
O'Kane spent his first years of active duty on the heavy cruiser USS Chester and destroyer USS Pruitt. He received submarine instruction in 1938 and was then assigned to the USS Argonaut. O'Kane qualified for submarines aboard the Argonaut in 1938 and remained aboard until her overhaul at Mare Island, California in 1942.

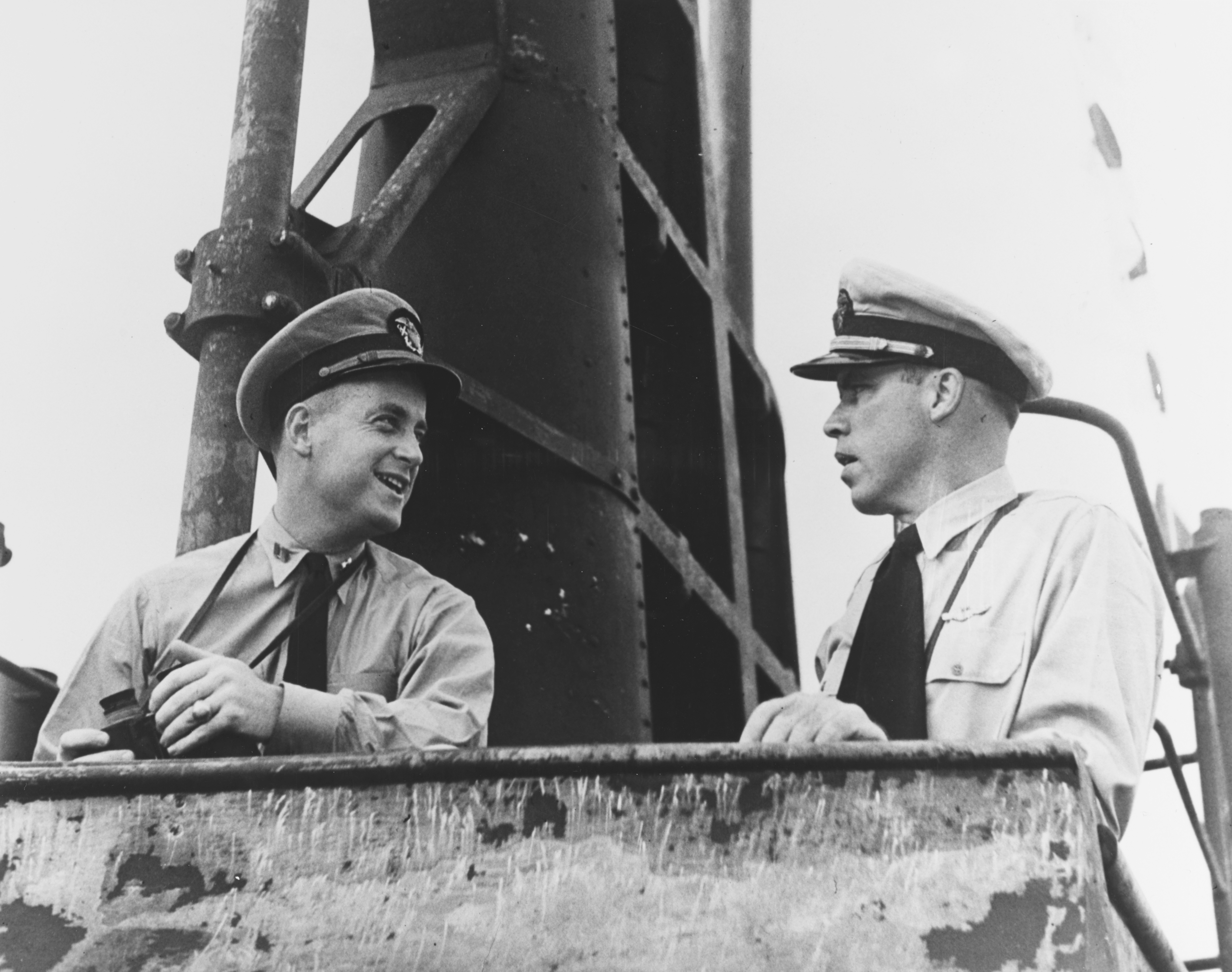
O'Kane (left) speaks with his commanding officer, Dudley Morton, on the bridge of the Wahoo c. February 1943

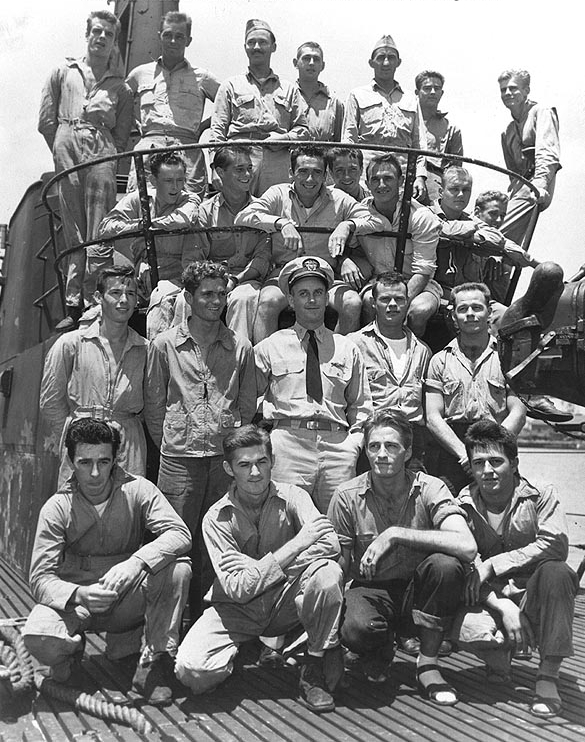
O'Kane with airmen rescued off Truk Island in May 1944

=== World War II ===
In early 1942, Lieutenant O'Kane joined the pre-commissioning crew of the new submarine USS Wahoo and served as its executive officer on five war patrols during World War II, first under Lieutenant Commander Marvin G. "Pinky" Kennedy and later under the legendary Lieutenant Commander Dudley "Mush" Morton. Morton established a record as an excellent tactician, as he preferred to run the demanding analysis and plots while his executive officer manned the periscopes, a reversal of standard practices. Under Morton's tutelage, O'Kane developed the skills that enabled him to become the single most accomplished American submarine commander in history.

In July 1943, following his fifth patrol in Wahoo, O'Kane was detached, promoted to lieutenant commander, and shortly made prospective commanding officer of USS Tang, which was then under construction. He placed her in commission on the 15th of October, 1943 and commanded her for her entire career. Unbeknownst to O'Kane, only four days prior, the USS Wahoo would be sunk in the La Perouse Strait by Japanese forces, killing all 79 crew members, including Lieutenant Commander Dudley "Mush" Morton.

O’Kane was an innovator, developing several operational tactics that markedly increased his ship's effectiveness. Among these were daylight surface cruising with extra lookouts; periscope recognition and range drills (enabling clear tactical sureness when seconds counted); drifting when not bound somewhere; and methods of night surface attacks, one of his favorite techniques to obtain and maintain the initiative in battle.

In five war patrols on the Tang, O'Kane was originally recognized for sinking a total of 24 Japanese ships – the second-highest total for a single American submarine and the highest for a single commanding officer. Postwar reviews of Japanese war records, corroborated by Tang's surviving logs and crewmen, revised the totals to 33 ships totalling over 116,454 long tons (118,323 t) sunk. This placed Tang first for both number of ships and tonnage (ahead of USS Tautog's 26 ships and USS Flasher's 100,231 long tons). Several times during the war, he took Tang into the middle of a convoy and attacked ships ahead and behind – counting on Tang's relative position, speed, and low profile to keep clear of enemy escorts.

Tang's third patrol, into the Yellow Sea, sank more Japanese ships than any other submarine patrol of the war. O'Kane claimed eight ships sunk; post-war analysis increased this to 10 ships. During one attack, he fired six torpedoes at two large ships. Japanese records showed the torpedoes actually hit four ships. This number of sinkings surpassed the next highest patrol, Wahoo's (with O'Kane as executive officer) in the same area the year before.

Under O'Kane, Tang also performed "lifeguard duty", a common joint operation, with a Fast Carrier Task Force, of positioning one or more submarines in a "ditching station" off an enemy island under air attack in order to rescue downed pilots. Off Truk, he and the Tang rescued 22 airmen in one mission, for which they earned a Presidential Unit Citation.

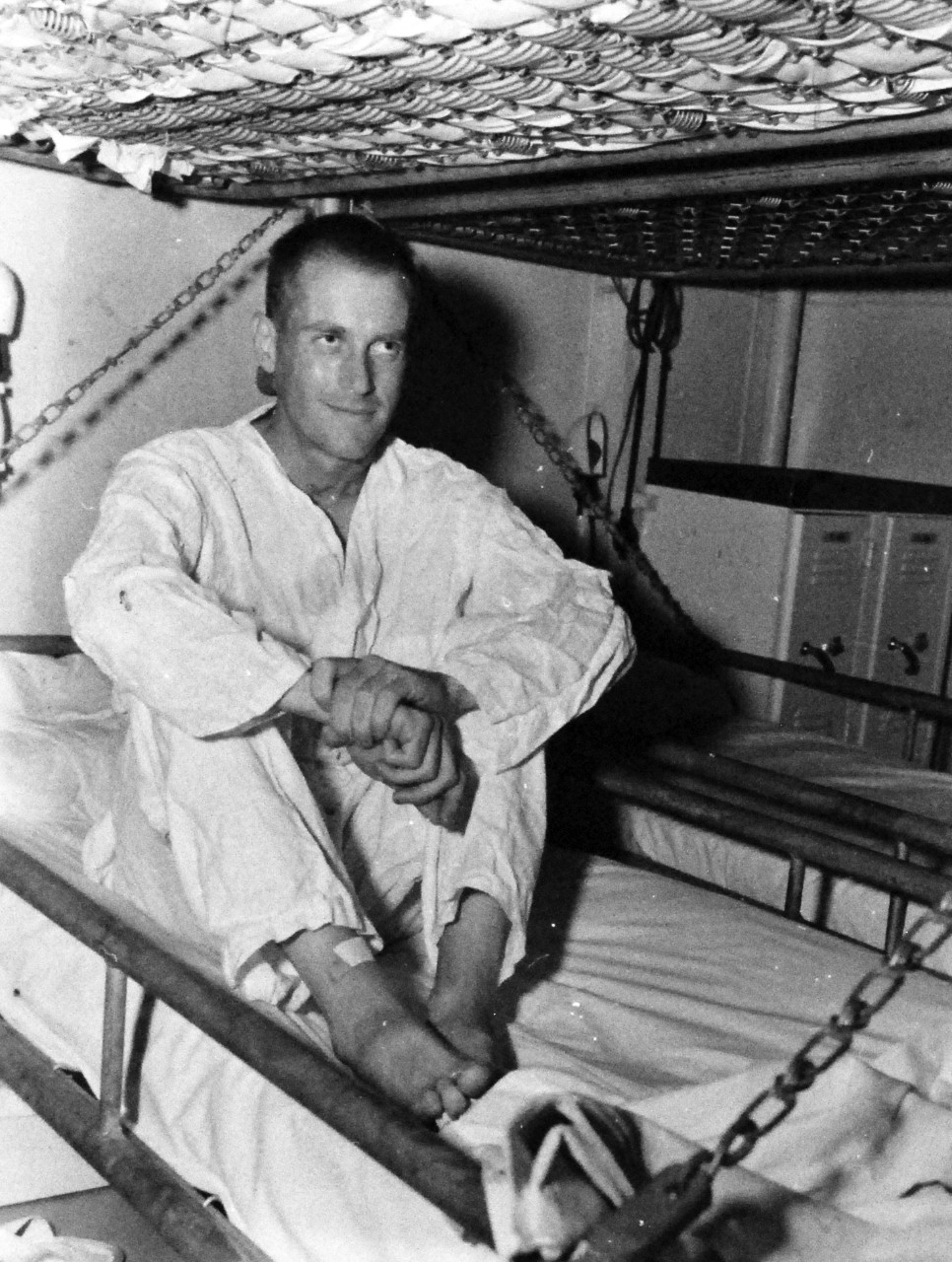
O'Kane as just-released prisoner of war, September 24, 1945

O'Kane was captured by the Japanese when Tang was sunk in the Formosa Strait by her own flawed torpedo (a circular run of a Mark 18) during a surface night attack on October 24–25, 1944. O'Kane lost all but eight members of his crew, and was at first secretly held captive at the Ōfuna navy detention center, then later moved to the regular army Omori POW camp. At the time of his release, O'Kane was near death; his weight was less than 100 pounds. He was immediately transferred to the hospital ship USS Benevolence (AH-13).

Following his release, O'Kane received the Medal of Honor for "conspicuous gallantry and intrepidity" during his submarine's final operations against Japanese shipping.

=== Post-war appointments ===
In the years following World War II, O'Kane served with the Pacific Reserve Fleet as commanding officer of the submarine tender USS Pelias, testified at Japanese war crimes trials, was executive officer of the submarine tender USS Nereus and was Commander, Submarine Division 32 (ComSubDiv 32). He was a student at the Armed Forces Staff College in 1950–51 and was subsequently assigned to the Submarine School at New London, Connecticut, initially as an instructor and, in 1952–53, as the commanding officer.

Promoted to the rank of captain in July 1953, O'Kane commanded the submarine tender USS Sperry until June 1954 and then became Commander, Submarine Squadron Seven (ComSubRon 7). Following studies at the Naval War College in 1955–56, he served in Washington, D.C., with the Ship Characteristics Board. O'Kane retired from active duty in July 1957 and, on the basis of his extensive combat record and under the tombstone promotion rule in effect at the time, was simultaneously advanced to the rank of rear admiral on the Retired List.

== Later life and legacy ==
O'Kane died of pneumonia, on February 16, 1994 in Petaluma, California, at age 83. O'Kane and his wife Ernestine are buried at Arlington National Cemetery, in Arlington, Virginia.

In 1998, the Arleigh Burke-class destroyer USS O'Kane (DDG-77) was named in his honor.

=== The O'Kane Cribbage board ===
The O'Kane Cribbage board has a storied history that dates back to World War II, during Kane's service aboard the USS Wahoo, under the command of LtCmdr Morton. In 1943, as the submarine headed to the Yellow Sea, Morton and O'Kane took out a cribbage board to calm tensions onboard. Morton dealt O'Kane a perfect 29, and that night, the Wahoo sank two Japanese freighters. A few days later, Morton dealt O'Kane a 28-point hand, and in the next two days, the Wahoo sunk three freighters. When O'Kane became commander of the USS Tang, it subsequently broke the record for most ships sunk in a patrol. So began the lore of the lucky O'Kane Cribbage board. The original cribbage board was lost when the USS Tang was sunk in 1944. In 1957, the "O'Kane Cribbage Board" was given to Admiral O'Kane by the crew from the new USS Tang (SS-563) to replace his lost board.

Since 1994, after the death of O'Kane, the wardroom of the oldest fast-attack submarine in the United States Pacific fleet carries O'Kane's personal cribbage board. Upon decommissioning, the board is transferred to the next oldest boat. The cribbage game set has passed between the following boats:

- USS Kamehameha (SSN-642), as of 1994
- USS Parche (SSN-683), as of 2 April 2002
- USS Los Angeles (SSN-688), as of 19 October 2004
- USS Bremerton (SSN-698), as of 4 February 2011
- USS Olympia (SSN-717), as of 21 May 2018
- USS Chicago (SSN-721), as of 29 October 2019
- USS Key West (SSN-722), as of 25 July 2023
- USS Scranton (SSN-756), as of March 28, 2025

== Summary of war patrols ==
With a total of 31 ships and 227,824t sunk during five patrols with USS Tang (24 ships and 93,824t, per JANAC), O'Kane ranks number one compared to all United States Navy skippers.

Summary of Richard O'Kane's USS Tang (SS-306) War Patrols
	Departing From	Date	Days	Wartime Credit Ships/Tonnage	JANAC Credit Ships/Tonnage	Patrol Area
Tang-1	Pearl Harbor, TH	January 1944	41	5 / 42,000	5 / 21,429	Marianas
Tang-2	Pearl Harbor, TH	March 1944	61	zero / zero	zero / zero	Palau
Tang-3	Pearl Harbor, TH	June 1944	36	8 / 56,000	10 / 39,160	East China Sea
Tang-4	Pearl Harbor, TH	August 1944	34	5 / 22,500	2 / 11,463	Empire
Tang-5	Pearl Harbor, TH	September 1944	lost	13 / 107,324	7 / 21,772	Formosa

== Medal of Honor citation ==
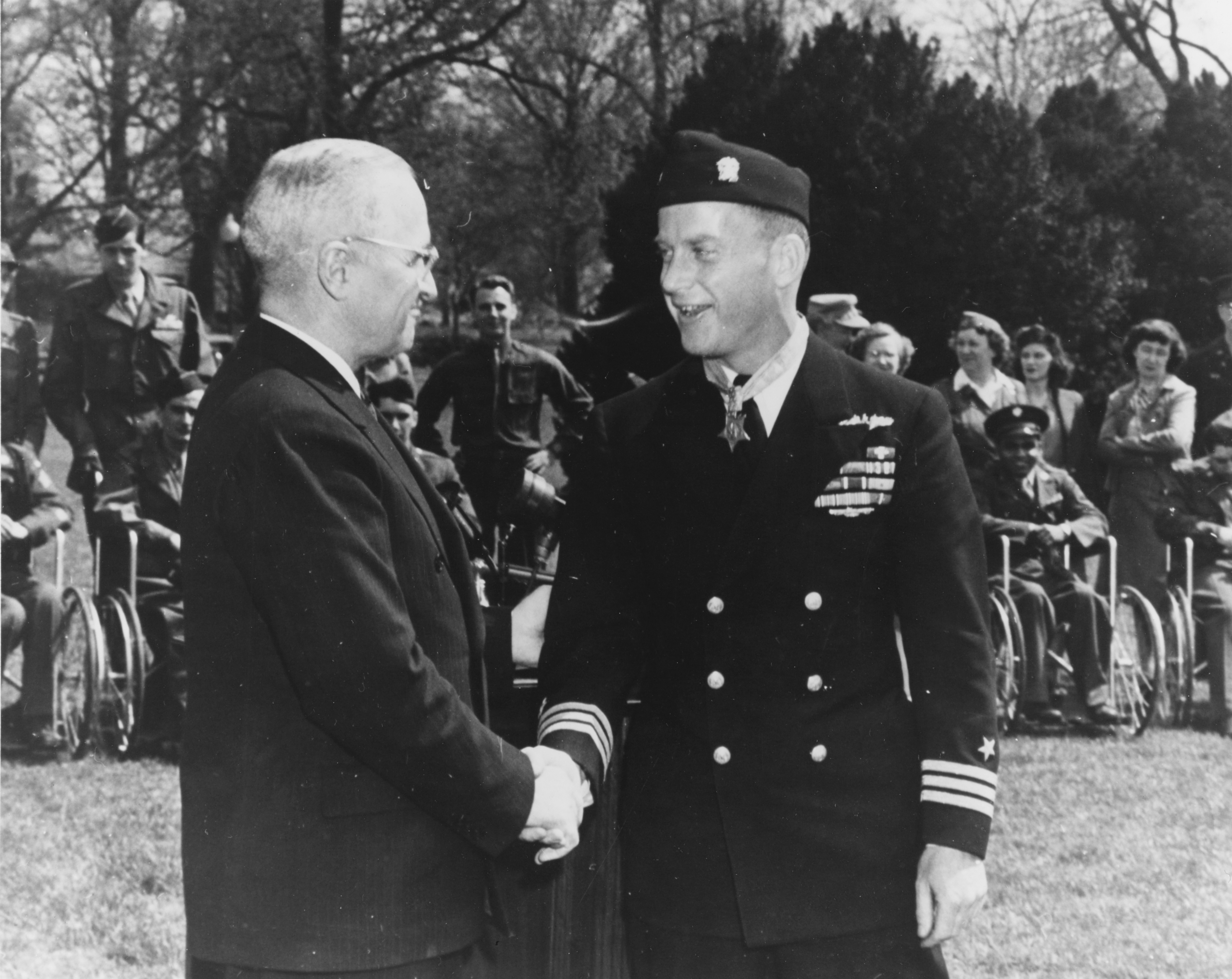
Commander O'Kane being awarded the Medal of Honor by President Harry S. Truman.

Rank and organization: Commander, United States Navy, commanding USS Tang. Place and date: Vicinity Philippine Islands, October 23, and October 24, 1944. Entered service at: New Hampshire. Born: February 2, 1911, Dover, N.H.

For conspicuous gallantry and intrepidity at the risk of his life above and beyond the call of duty as commanding officer of the U.S.S. Tang operating against 2 enemy Japanese convoys on 23 October and 24 October 1944, during her fifth and last war patrol. Boldly maneuvering on the surface into the midst of a heavily escorted convoy, CMDR O'Kane stood in the fusillade of bullets and shells from all directions to launch smashing hits on 3 tankers, coolly swung his ship to fire at a freighter and, in a split-second decision, shot out of the path of an onrushing transport, missing it by inches. Boxed in by blazing tankers, a freighter, transport, and several destroyers, he blasted 2 of the targets with his remaining torpedoes and, with pyrotechnics bursting on all sides, cleared the area. Twenty-four hours later, he again made contact with a heavily escorted convoy steaming to support the Leyte campaign with reinforcements and supplies and with crated planes piled high on each unit. In defiance of the enemy's relentless fire, he closed the concentration of ship and in quick succession sent 2 torpedoes each into the first and second transports and an adjacent tanker, finding his mark with each torpedo in a series of violent explosions at less than 1,000-yard range. With ships bearing down from all sides, he charged the enemy at high speed, exploding the tanker in a burst of flame, smashing the transport dead in the water, and blasting the destroyer with a mighty roar which rocked the Tang from stem to stern. Expending his last 2 torpedoes into the remnants of a once powerful convoy before his own ship went down, Comdr. O'Kane, aided by his gallant command, achieved an illustrious record of heroism in combat, enhancing the finest traditions of the U.S. Naval Service.

== Awards and decorations ==
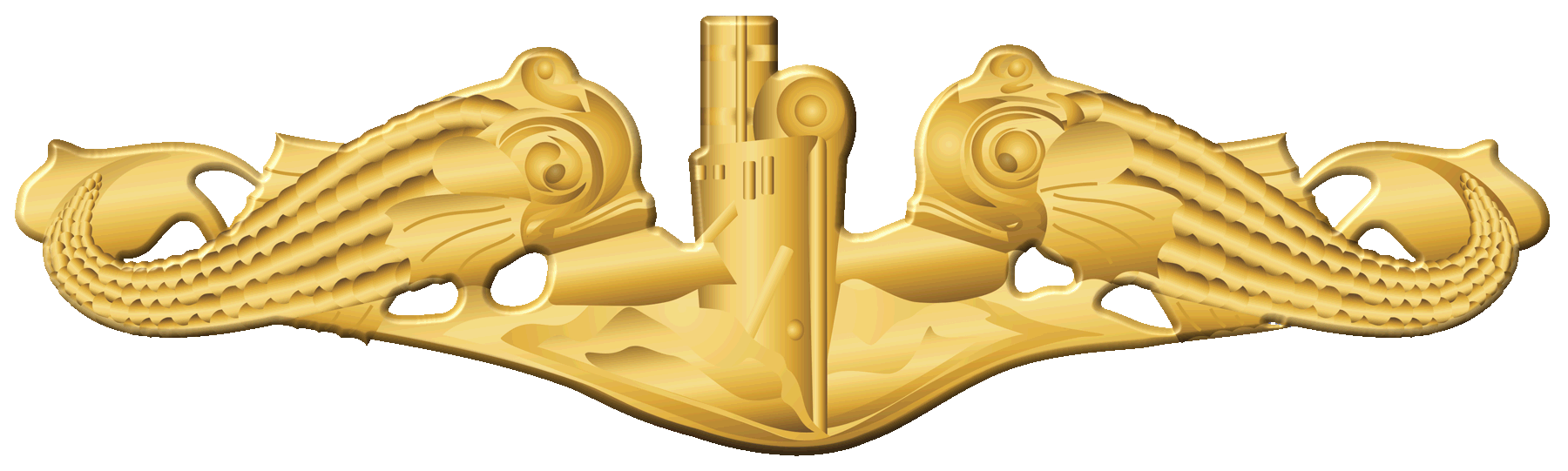

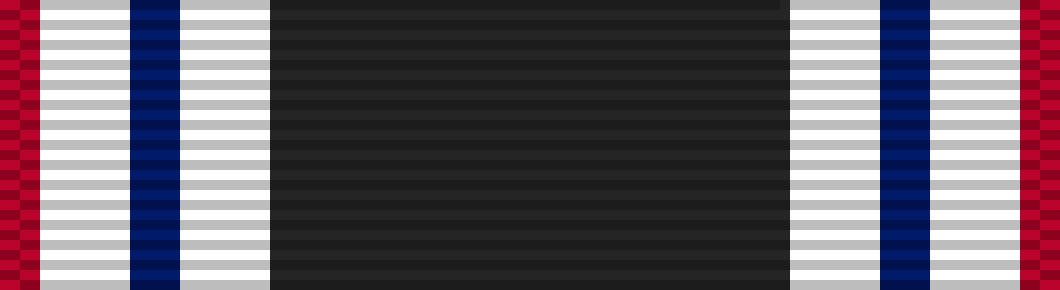

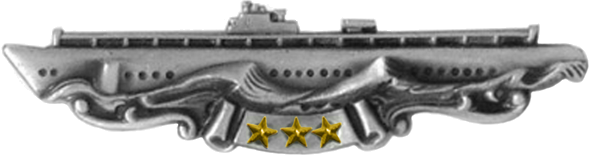

Badge	Submarine Warfare insignia		
1st row	Medal of Honor		
2nd row	Navy Cross with 2 5/16 inch stars	Silver Star with 2 5/16 inch stars	Legion of Merit with "V" Device
3rd row	Purple Heart	Navy and Marine Corps Commendation Medal with "V" Device	Combat Action Ribbon
4th row	Navy Presidential Unit Citation with 2 service stars	Prisoner of War Medal	American Defense Service Medal with "Fleet Clasp"
5th row	American Campaign Medal	Asiatic Pacific Campaign Medal with 9 campaign stars	World War II Victory Medal
6th row	National Defense Service Medal	Philippine Liberation Medal with 2 campaign stars	Navy Rifle Marksmanship Medal
Badge	Submarine Combat Patrol Insignia		

== Works ==
He wrote books about his service on Tang and Wahoo, titled Clear the Bridge!: The War Patrols of the USS Tang and Wahoo: The Patrols of America's Most Famous World War II Submarine, respectively.

- O'Kane, Richard H. (1977). Clear the Bridge!: The War Patrols of the USS Tang. Chicago: Rand McNally. ISBN 978-0-528-81058-9. OCLC 2965421.
- O'Kane, Richard H. (1987). Wahoo: The Patrols of America's Most Famous World War II Submarine. Novato, California: Presidio Press. ISBN 978-0-89141-301-1. OCLC 15366413.

== See also ==
- List of Medal of Honor recipients
