= USS Los Angeles (SSN-688) =

Los Angeles-class nuclear-powered attack submarine of the US Navy

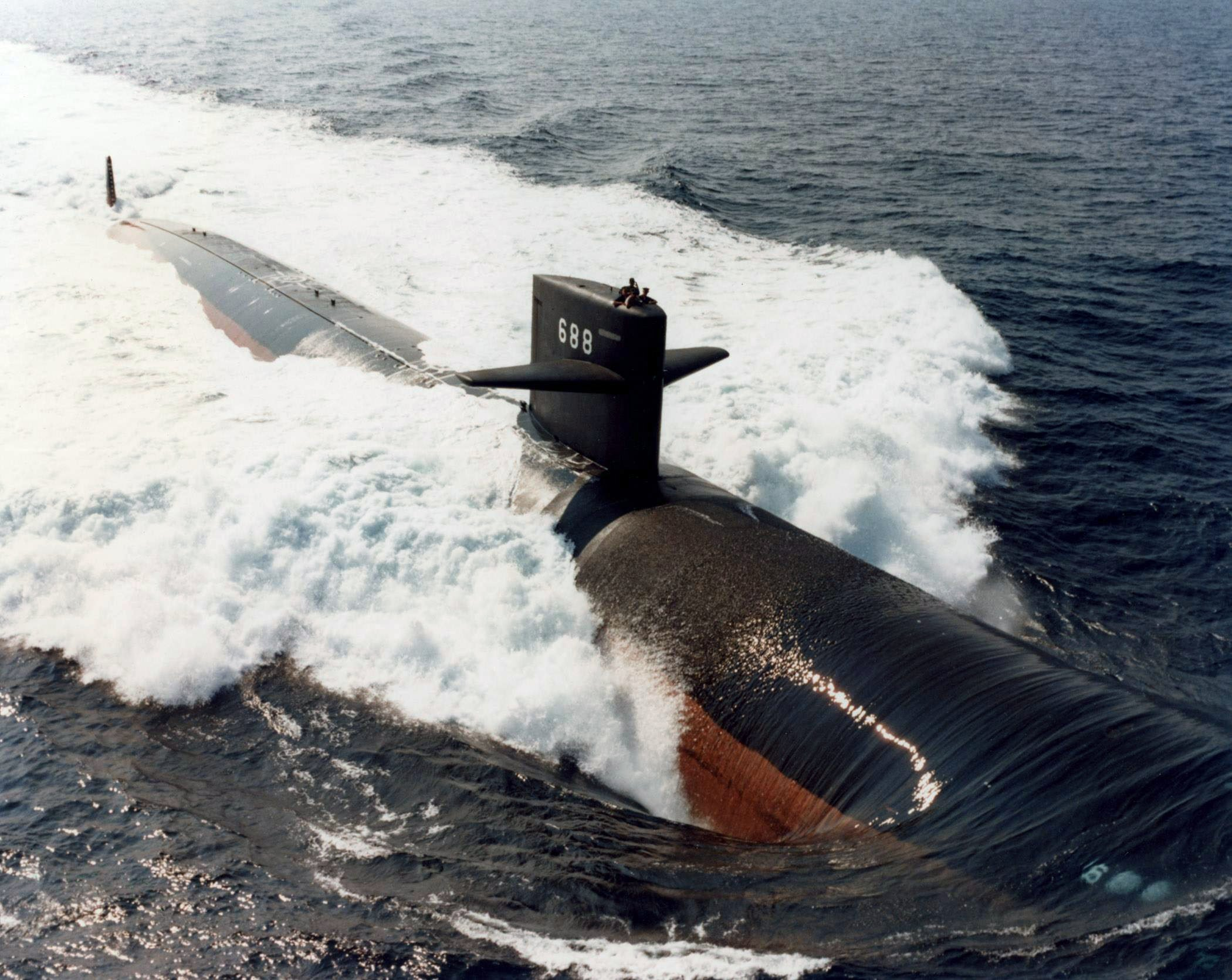

History

United States
- Name: Los Angeles
- Namesake: City of Los Angeles
- Awarded: 8 January 1971
- Builder: Newport News Shipbuilding
- Laid down: 8 January 1972
- Launched: 6 April 1974
- Commissioned: 13 November 1976
- Decommissioned: 4 February 2011
- Out of service: 1 February 2010
- Stricken: 4 February 2011
- Home port: Pearl Harbor
- Fate: Disposed of by Recycling
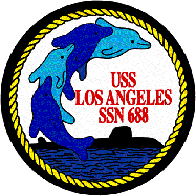
- Badge

General characteristics
- Class & type: Los Angeles-class submarine
- Displacement: 5,700 tons light; 6,072 tons full; 1,372 tons dead
- Length: 110.3 m (361 ft 11 in)
- Beam: 10 m (32 ft 10 in)
- Draft: 9.4 m (30 ft 10 in)
- Propulsion: S6G nuclear reactor; 2 turbines; 35,000 hp (26 MW); 1 auxiliary motor 325 hp (242 kW); 1 shaft
- Speed: 25 knots (46 km/h) surfaced; 30 knots (56 km/h) submerged (actual top speed classified)
- Test depth: 290 m (950 ft)
- Complement: 13 Officers; 121 Enlisted
- Armament: 4 × 21 in (533 mm) bow tubes; Mark 48 torpedo; Harpoon missile; Tomahawk cruise missile

USS Los Angeles (SSN-688), lead ship of her class of submarines, was the fourth ship of the United States Navy to be named for Los Angeles, California. The contract to build her was awarded to Newport News Shipbuilding and Dry Dock Company in Newport News, Virginia on 8 January 1971 and her keel was laid down on 8 January 1972. She was launched on 6 April 1974 sponsored by Anne Armstrong, and commissioned on 13 November 1976. She hosted President Jimmy Carter and the First Lady on 27 May 1977 for an at-sea demonstration of her capabilities. In 2007 she was the oldest submarine in active service with the United States Navy. The Navy decommissioned Los Angeles on 23 January 2010, in the Port of Los Angeles, Los Angeles, California, her namesake city.

== Deployments ==
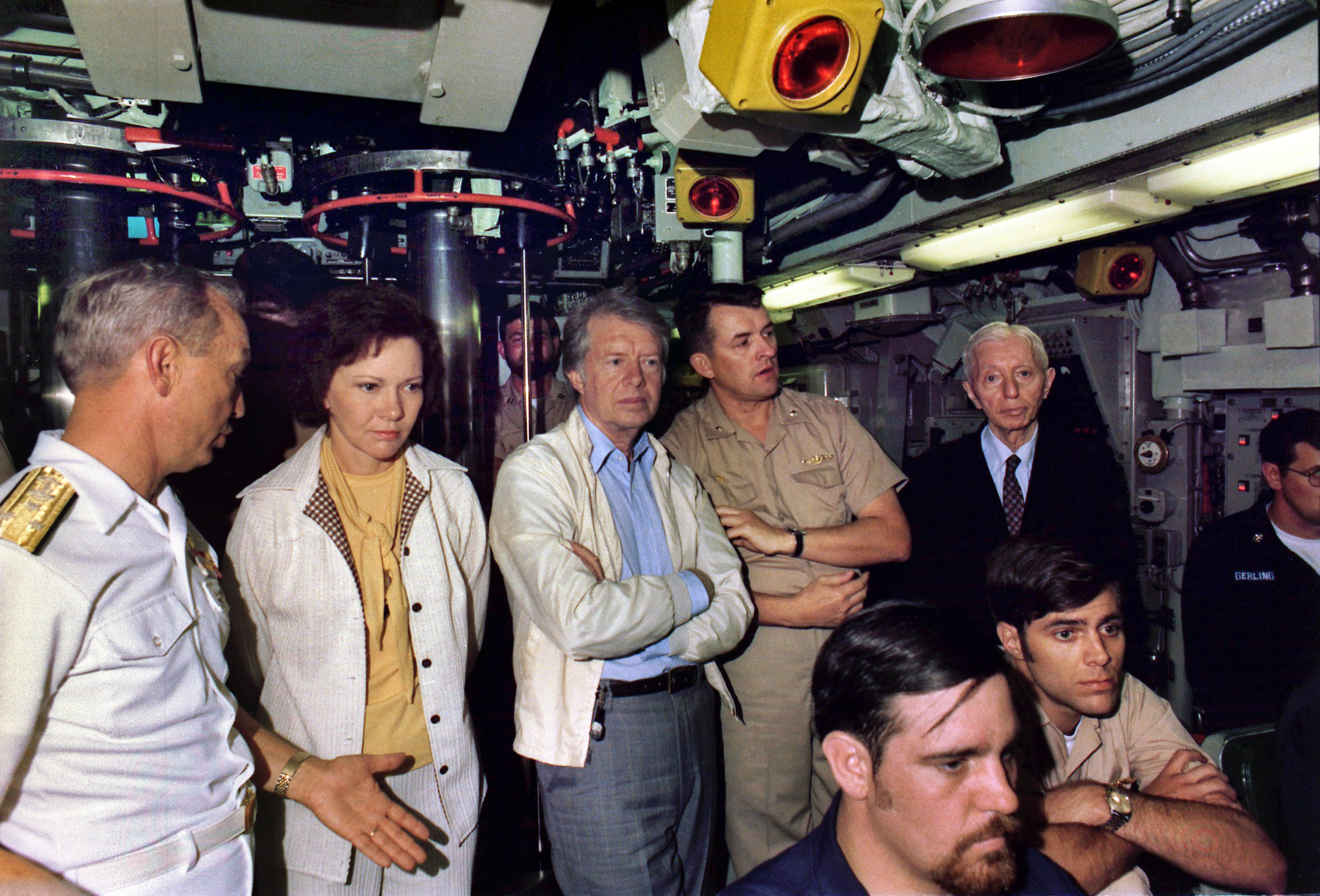
Rosalynn Carter, President Jimmy Carter, and Adm. Hyman G. Rickover (far right) aboard Los Angeles, May 1977

Los Angeles made her first operational deployment to the Mediterranean Sea in 1977 and was awarded a Meritorious Unit Citation. In 1978, she transferred to the Pacific Fleet and was assigned to Submarine Squadron 7, homeported in Pearl Harbor. She conducted 17 Pacific deployments over the next 32 years and earned eight Meritorious Unit Citations and a Navy Unit Citation. Los Angeles participated in four multinational "Rim of the Pacific" (RIMPAC) exercises, and visited numerous foreign ports in Italy, Republic of the Philippines, Diego Garcia, Hong Kong, Mauritius, Australia, Japan, Republic of Korea, Canada and Singapore.

In 1999, Los Angeles was modified to carry a Dry Deck Shelter (DDS). Her capabilities included undersea warfare, surface warfare, strike warfare, mining operations, special forces delivery, reconnaissance, carrier battle group support and escort, and intelligence collection.

== Decommissioning ==
Los Angeles was inactivated on 1 February 2010 and decommissioned 4 February 2011. The wardroom of the oldest submarine in the fleet carries Richard O'Kane's personal cribbage board, and upon her decommissioning the board was transferred to the next oldest boat at that time, USS Bremerton (SSN-698). Ex-Los Angeles entered the Navy's Ship-Submarine Recycling Program, 1 February 2010, and recycling was completed 30 November 2012.
