= USS O'Kane =

Arleigh Burke-class destroyer

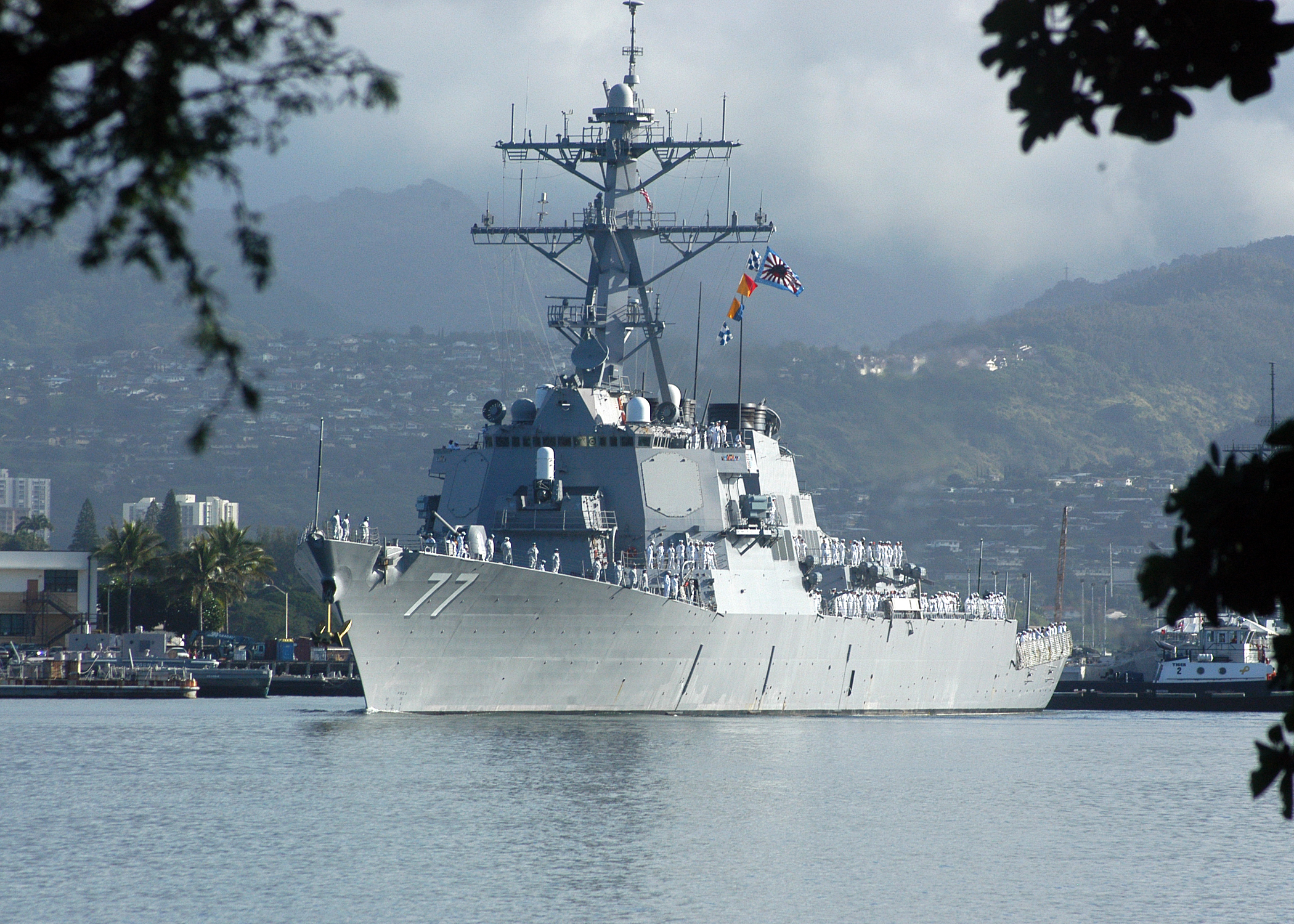
- USS O'Kane (DDG-77), at Pearl Harbor on 7 February 2005

History

United States
- Name: O'Kane
- Namesake: Richard O'Kane
- Ordered: 20 July 1994
- Builder: Bath Iron Works
- Laid down: 8 May 1997
- Launched: 28 March 1998
- Acquired: 19 May 1999
- Commissioned: 23 October 1999
- Home port: San Diego
- Identification: MMSI number: 338999000; Callsign: NOKN; Hull number: DDG-77
- Motto: A Tradition of Honor
- Status: in active service
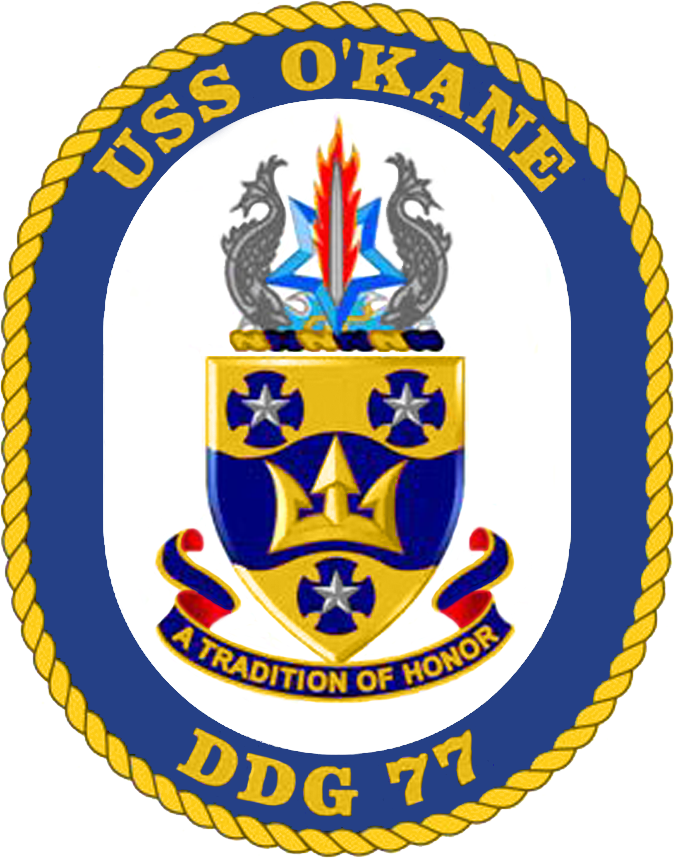
- Badge

General characteristics
- Class & type: Arleigh Burke-class destroyer
- Displacement: 8,637 long tons (8,776 t) (Full load)
- Length: 505 ft (154 m)
- Beam: 59 ft (18 m)
- Draft: 31 ft (9.4 m)
- Installed power: 4 × General Electric LM2500-30 gas turbines; 100,000 shp (75,000 kW)
- Propulsion: 2 × shafts
- Speed: In excess of 30 kn (56 km/h; 35 mph)
- Range: 4,400 nmi (8,100 km; 5,100 mi) at 20 kn (37 km/h; 23 mph)
- Complement: 33 commissioned officers; 38 chief petty officers; 210 enlisted personnel
- Sensors & processing systems: AN/SPY-1D PESA 3D radar (Flight I, II, IIA); AN/SPY-6(V)1 AESA 3D radar (Flight III); AN/SPS-67(V)3 or (V)5 surface search radar (DDG-51 – DDG-118); AN/SPQ-9B surface search radar (DDG-119 onward); AN/SPS-73(V)12 surface search/navigation radar (DDG-51 – DDG-86); BridgeMaster E surface search/navigation radar (DDG-87 onward); 3 × AN/SPG-62 fire-control radar; Mk 46 optical sight system (Flight I, II, IIA); Mk 20 electro-optical sight system (Flight III); AN/SQQ-89 ASW combat system: AN/SQS-53C sonar array; AN/SQR-19 tactical towed array sonar (Flight I, II, IIA); TB-37U multi-function towed array sonar (DDG-113 onward); AN/SQQ-28 LAMPS III shipboard system
- Electronic warfare & decoys: AN/SLQ-32 electronic warfare suite; AN/SLQ-25 Nixie torpedo countermeasures; Mk 36 Mod 12 decoy launching systems; Mk 53 Nulka decoy launching systems; Mk 59 decoy launching systems
- Armament: Guns: 1 × 5-inch (127 mm)/54 mk 45 mod 1/2 (lightweight gun); 2 × 20 mm (0.8 in) Phalanx CIWS; 2 × 25 mm (0.98 in) Mk 38 machine gun system; 4 × 0.50 inches (12.7 mm) caliber guns; Missiles: 2 × Mk 141 Harpoon anti-ship missile launcher; 1 × 29-cell, 1 × 61-cell (90 total cells) Mk 41 vertical launching system (VLS): RIM-66M surface-to-air missile; RIM-156 surface-to-air missile; RIM-161 anti-ballistic missile; BGM-109 Tomahawk cruise missile; RUM-139 vertical launch ASROC; Torpedoes: 2 × Mark 32 triple torpedo tubes: Mark 46 lightweight torpedo; Mark 50 lightweight torpedo; Mark 54 lightweight torpedo
- Aircraft carried: 1 × Sikorsky MH-60R

USS O'Kane (DDG-77) is the 27th Arleigh Burke-class (Flight II) Aegis guided missile destroyer in the United States Navy. The ship was built by Bath Iron Works in Bath, Maine, starting on 8 May 1997. The ship was commissioned on 23 October 1999. She is named for Medal of Honor recipient Rear Admiral Richard O'Kane.

== Service history ==
USS O'Kane, a Baseline 5.3 Flight II Arleigh Burke-class guided missile destroyer, is the 27th destroyer of the class and the sixteenth built by Bath Iron Works. O’Kane is the second ship to be commissioned in her home port of Pearl Harbor, Hawaii. She was laid down on 8 May 1997 at Bath Iron Works in Bath, Maine, launched on 28 March 1998, christened on 17 April 1998 and commissioned 23 October 1999. While transiting to Pearl Harbor on 2 October 1999, twenty one days prior to her commissioning, O'Kane briefly rendezvoused off the coast of Ixtapa, Mexico with the decommissioned battleship USS New Jersey (BB-62) en route to Philadelphia for restoration as a museum ship.

O'Kane participated in RIMPAC 2000. O'Kane participated in Fleet Week San Diego in October 2000. O'Kane deployed on her maiden deployment on 1 August 2001. While on deployment O'Kane conducted Maritime Interdiction Operations in the Northern Persian Gulf during the opening stages of Operation Enduring Freedom. O'Kane returned home to Pearl Harbor in late January 2002. O'Kane received the Battle "E" award for Destroyer Squadron 31 for 2001. O'Kane also received the Navy Unit Commendation, her first Armed Forces Expeditionary Medal, her first Sea Service Ribbon, and National Defense Service Medals while on her Maiden Deployment.

In September 2002, O'Kane completed an accelerated innovative training cycle eight months ahead of schedule with the Carl Vinson Battle Group to be ready for contingency operations. O'Kane was further accelerated and deployed independently, leaving homeport 17 January 2003. Initially O'Kane provided escort to shipping and conducted Operation Enduring Freedom boardings of suspect terrorist vessels, then she rapidly transitioned to combat operations in support of Operation Iraqi Freedom. O'Kane projected combat power ashore with several salvos of Tomahawk cruise missiles and provided early warning of ballistic missile launches to command centers, Patriot missile batteries, and civil defense forces, supporting a protective umbrella for coalition ground and naval forces. O'Kane then transitioned to providing post-hostility maritime security of Iraqi waters. O'Kane returned home to Pearl Harbor late July 2003. O'Kane was awarded the Navy Unit Commendation and Global War on Terror Expeditionary Medal for her second deployment. Following post-deployment maintenance, O'Kane commenced the basic phase of training for her next deployment.

In February 2005, O'Kane deployed with USS Carl Vinson Carrier Strike Group in support of the Global War on Terrorism (GWOT). In July, O'Kane returned to her Pearl Harbor homeport after the scheduled deployment which also included Maritime Security Operations (MSO) off the Horn of Africa and Indian Ocean.

In July 2006, the guided-missile destroyer departed Pearl Harbor to participate in exercise Rim of the Pacific (RIMPAC) 2006. In September, O'Kane participated in Composite Training Unit Exercise (COMPTUEX), as part of the John C. Stennis Carrier Strike Group Three.

In January 2007, O'Kane departed Pearl Harbor for a scheduled deployment with the John C. Stennis group. In February, O'Kane entered the U.S. 5th Fleet Area of Operations (AoO) to conduct Maritime Security Operations. In August the guided-missile destroyer participated in exercise Valiant Shield 2007. In August, O'Kane returned home after a seven-month deployment.

In April 2008, O'Kane went on a surge deployment with the Nimitz Carrier Strike Group in the western Pacific. In June, O'Kane returned to homeport after a seven-week underway period. In July the guided-missile destroyer participated in the Rim of the Pacific (RIMPAC) 2008.

In February 2009, O'Kane returned to Pearl Harbor homeport after a four-and-a-half-month underway period which included ANNUALEX 20G and the defense of Iraqi oil platforms in the Persian Gulf. In September, O'Kane departed homeport for a western Pacific deployment. In November the guided-missile destroyer participated in Annual Exercise (ANNUALEX) 21G. In December, O'Kane returned to Naval Station Pearl Harbor after her deployment.

In July 2010, O'Kane departed Joint Base Pearl Harbor-Hickam for a Middle East deployment as part of Commander, Task Force-Iraqi Maritime, supporting maritime security cooperation efforts in the U.S. 5th Fleet Area of Responsibility (AoR).

In February 2011, O'Kane returned home after her seven-month deployment. On 14 April, O'Kane, fired and guided an SM-3 Block IA missile that intercepted the intermediate-range ballistic missile, the 21st successful intercept, in 25 attempts, for the Aegis Ballistic Missile Defense. In November the participated in integrated training exercise "Koa Kai 12-1", off the coast of Hawaii.

On 23 March 2012, O'Kane departed Pearl Harbor for a scheduled Middle East deployment with a primary focus on Ballistic Missile Defense operations. In November, O'Kane returned to her homeport in Pearl Harbor after seven-and-a-half-month deployment.

The ship entered Pearl Harbor Naval Shipyard in February 2015 for an overhaul at a total cost of over $56 million. It ended in February 2016, four days shy of a full year.

On 4 March 2017, O'Kane departed Pearl Harbor for an Eastern Pacific Deployment to participate in Northern Edge. She made her way to Port Hueneme, San Diego, and Juneau Alaska. O'Kane returned to Pearl Harbor 15 June 2017.

On 3 November 2017, O'Kane departed Joint Base Pearl Harbor heading towards the Western Pacific. For the next seven months O'Kane remained the ready ballistic missile defense asset for Defense of Guam. During these seven months O'Kane made three short port visits to Guam, Saipan, and at the request of the Commanding Officer, Yokosuka, Japan. O'Kane was welcomed back to Pearl Harbor on 4 June 2018.

O'Kane arrived at the Port of Colombo, situated in Colombo, Sri Lanka on 21 August 2024 on a replenishment visit. The vessel is scheduled to depart the island on 22 August 2024.

=== Awards ===
- Combat Action Ribbon - (Sep-Dec 2024)
- Navy Unit Commendation - (Sep-Dec 2001)
- Navy E Ribbon - (2001)
- Secretary of the Navy (SECNAV) Energy Conservation Award (Afloat (Small) category) - (2019)

== Coat of arms ==
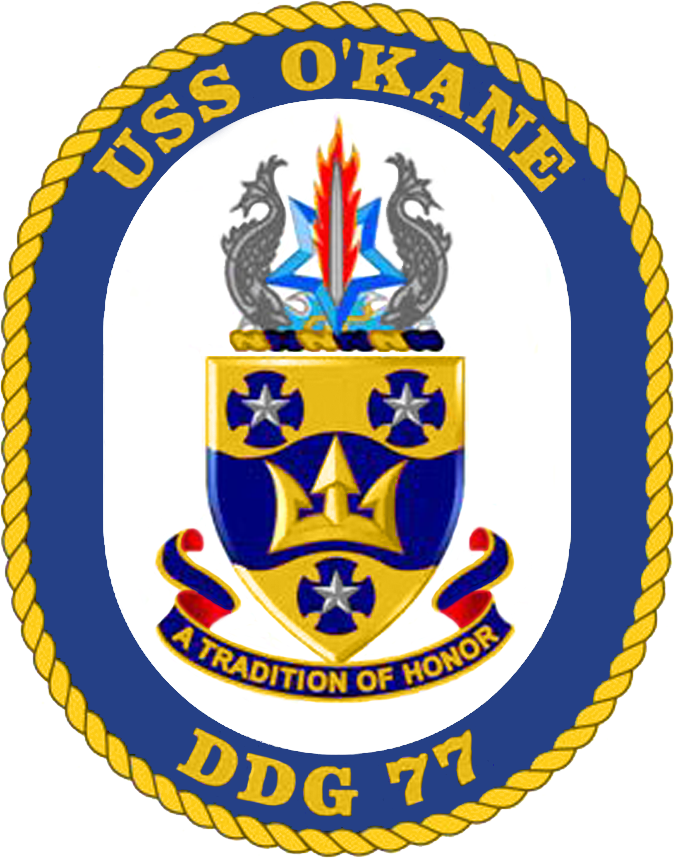
Emblem

=== Shield ===
The shield has a background of gold and a blue wave that crosses the middle. In the center is a gold trident. Surrounding the trident is three crosses with a star at the center of each cross.

The traditional Navy colors were chosen for the shield because dark blue and gold represents the sea and excellence respectively. The trident at the center of the shield symbolizes the ship's ability to project naval power in hostile environments. The crosses and stars is a reference to the three Navy Crosses and three Silver Stars awarded to Rear Admiral O’Kane, during his Navy career.

=== Crest ===
The crest consists of a flaming Naval sword rising from the sea, a reversed star and two dolphins that border the crest on each side.

The sword is a symbol that recognizes the naval power displayed by Admiral O’Kane and his crew. The star surrounding the sword is a reference to the Medal of Honor earned by the Rear Admiral for his extraordinary actions at sea. The two dolphins are an allusion to the Rear Admiral's time as a submariner. The red in the sword and in the border of the motto stands for O’Kane's valor and sacrifice, during his time as a prisoner of war in two Japanese Camps during WWII.

=== Motto ===
The motto is written on a scroll of blue that has a red reverse side.

The ship's motto is "A Tradition of Honor". The motto is a reference to both the honorable feats of Admiral O'Kane and the Medal of Honor he received.

=== Seal ===
The seal consists of the ship’s shield, crest, and motto; all of which is surrounded by a dark blue oval with a gold rope border. The ship’s name is inscribed at the top of the oval, while the ship’s hull number sits at the bottom.
