= Virtual periscope =

Virtual periscope is a system that allows submerged submarines to observe the surface above them without having to come to a shallower depth, as is required by traditional periscopes.

The system, described in a patent as "Virtual Periscope", was tested in 2005 aboard USS Chicago (SSN-721). It employed a small camera mounted on the sail of the submarine that uses the surface of the ocean as a lens, collecting light from above the surface and refracting it below. High-speed signal processing software assembles an image of what is on the surface. At the time, the system's resolution did not allow ship identification, only indicating that something was on the surface. Objects 30 meters (98 feet) tall could be seen at about a distance of 1,600 meters (one mile). Sufficient light was available when a camera was positioned shallower than 30 to 60 meters (98 to 197 ft).

== Stella maris ==
In 2014 Technion – Israel Institute of Technology researchers modeled a variant of virtual periscope on the image-processing technology used in astronomical observations to ameliorate the blur inherent in viewing stars through the atmosphere.

The technology behind Stella maris was disclosed to the public in a presentation at the IEEE International Conference on Computational Photography, held May 2–4, 2014 in Santa Clara, California. Associate Professor Yoav Y. Schechner of the Technion Department of Electrical Engineering explained the connection:

When the water surface is wavy, sun-rays refract according to the waves and project onto the solar image plane. With the pinhole array, we obtain an array of tiny solar images on the diffuser. When all of the components work together, the Stella Maris system acts as both a wave sensor to estimate the water surface, and a viewing system to see the above surface image of interest through a computerized, synthesized image of the surface.

== Bibliography ==
- "An Airborne Virtual Periscope". Technion, Israel Institute of Technology. 2014-05-02.
