= USS Chicago (SSN-721) =

Los Angeles-class nuclear-powered attack submarine of the US Navy

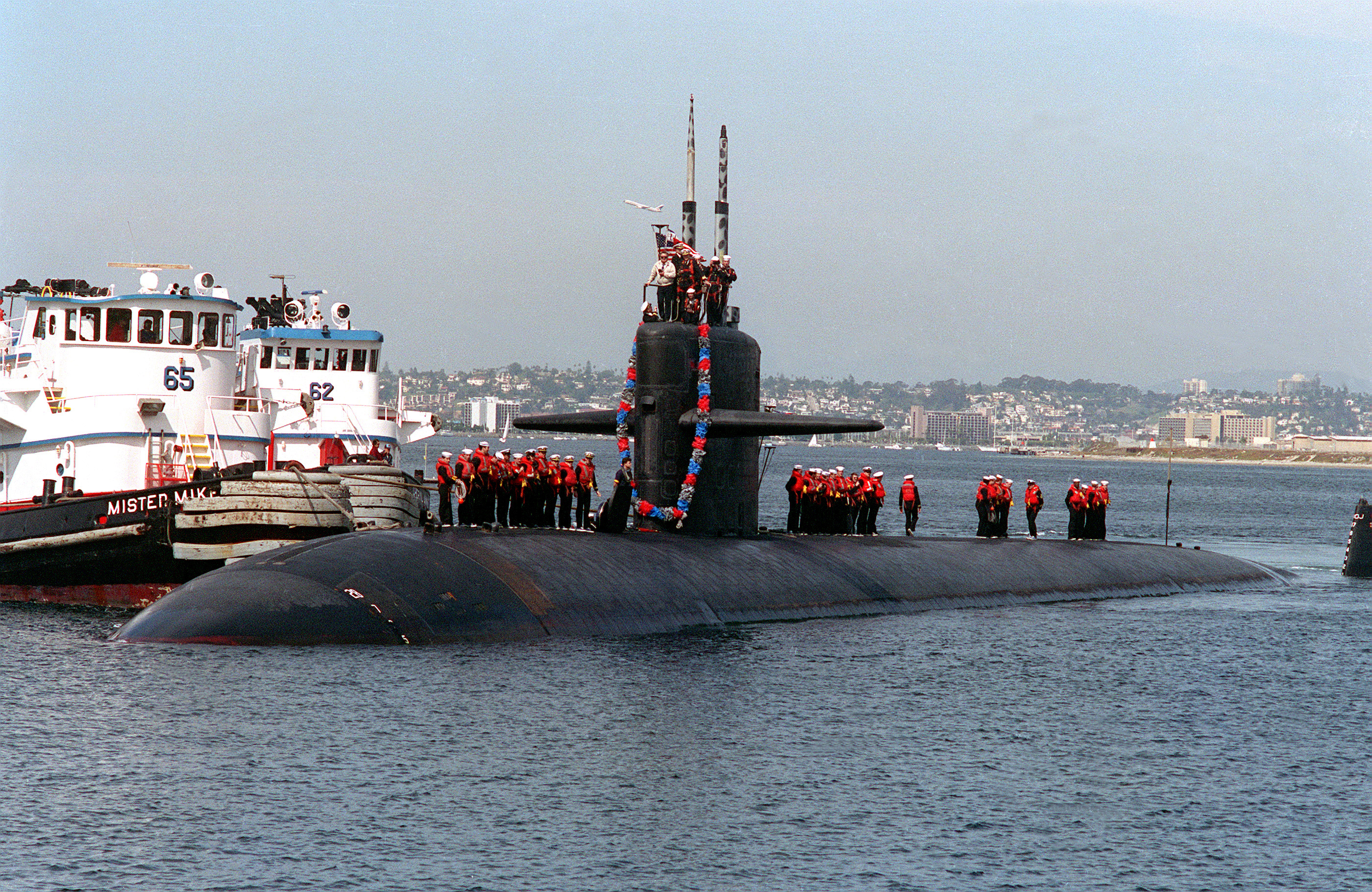
- USS Chicago returning from Desert Storm

History

United States
- Name: Chicago
- Namesake: The City of Chicago, Illinois
- Ordered: 13 August 1981
- Builder: Newport News Shipbuilding and Dry Dock Company, Newport News, Virginia
- Laid down: 5 January 1983
- Launched: 13 October 1984
- Commissioned: 27 September 1986
- Decommissioned: 21 July 2023
- Out of service: 24 January 2023
- Home port: Naval Base Kitsap-Bremerton
- Motto: We Will
- Status: Decommissioned and struck
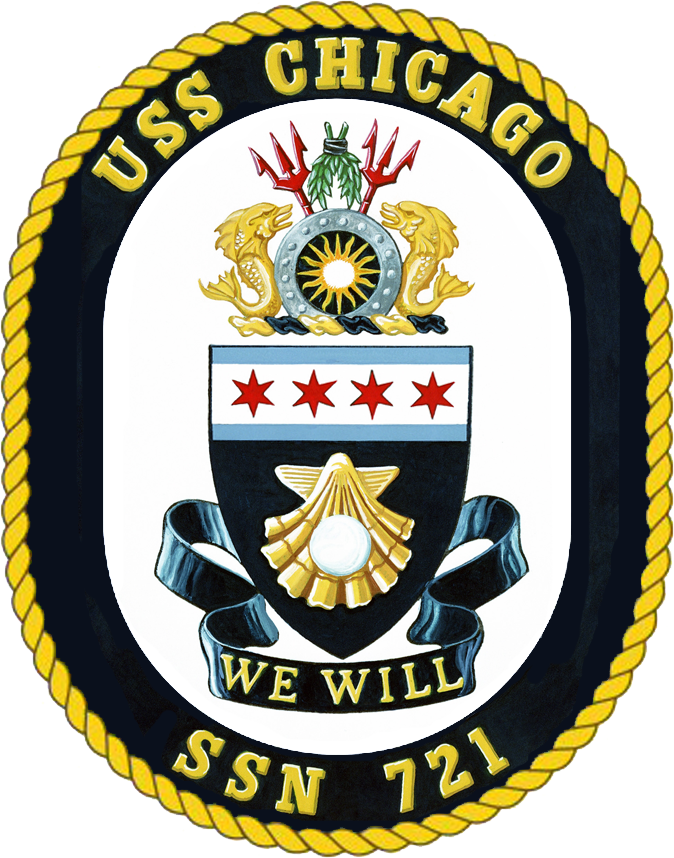
- Badge

General characteristics
- Class & type: Los Angeles-class submarine
- Displacement: 5,759 tons light, 6,162 tons full, 403 tons dead
- Length: 362 ft (110 m)
- Beam: 33 ft (10 m)
- Draft: 31 ft (9.4 m)
- Propulsion: 1 × S6G PWR nuclear reactor with D2W core (165 MW), HEU 93.5%; 2 × steam turbines (33,500) shp; 1 × shaft; 1 × secondary propulsion motor 325 hp (242 kW)
- Speed: Surfaced:20 knots (23 mph; 37 km/h); Submerged: +20 knots (23 mph; 37 km/h) (official)
- Complement: 12 officers, 98 men
- Sensors & processing systems: BQQ-5 passive sonar, BQS-15 detecting and ranging sonar, WLR-8 fire control radar receiver, WLR-9 acoustic receiver for detection of active search sonar and acoustic homing torpedoes, BRD-7 radio direction finder
- Armament: 4 × 21 in (533 mm) bow tubes, 12x Vertical Launching System tubes, 27 Mk48 ADCAP torpedo reloads, Tomahawk land attack missile block 3 SLCM range 1,700 nautical miles (3,100 km), Harpoon anti–surface ship missile range 70 nautical miles (130 km), mine laying Mk67 mobile Mk60 captor mines

USS Chicago (SSN-721) is a Los Angeles-class submarine, the fourth ship of the United States Navy to be named for the city of Chicago, Illinois. The contract to build her was awarded to Newport News Shipbuilding and Dry Dock Company in Newport News, Virginia on 13 August 1981 and her keel was laid down on 5 January 1983. She was launched on 13 October 1984 sponsored by Mrs. Vicki Ann Paisley, wife of Melvyn R. Paisley assistant Secretary of the Navy, and commissioned on 27 September 1986. The Chicago was retired in 2023.

== History ==
Early in 1996, an RQ-1 Predator aerial reconnaissance drone was successfully controlled from Chicago. The drone reached altitudes up to 6,000 meters (20,000 ft) and ranged up to 185 kilometers (100 nmi.) from the submarine, which was operating at periscope depth.

In the summer of 2005, Chicago tested the virtual periscope, a system that would allow submerged submarines to observe the surface above them without having to come to a shallower depth, as is required by traditional periscopes.

After completing a two-year maintenance and upgrade period at Pearl Harbor Naval Shipyard in October 2011, Chicago arrived in April 2012 at her new homeport, assigned to Submarine Squadron 15, based at Joint Region Marianas on the island of Guam.

In keeping with a tradition that dates back to World War II, Richard O'Kane's cribbage board was transferred from Olympia's Wardroom to Chicago's when Olympia was decommissioned on 31 October 2019, making Chicago the oldest fast attack boat in the Pacific Fleet.

On 2 November 2022, Chicago arrived at Pearl Harbor following a seven-month final deployment.

Chicago arrived at Puget Sound Naval Shipyard on 17 January 2023 for her months-long inactivation and decommissioning process. She was decommissioned on 21 July 2023 during a ceremony at Keyport, Washington.

== Awards ==
Chicago has earned multiple awards in her service life. Chicago has been awarded many unit awards, including the Navy Unit Commendation, three Meritorious Unit Commendations and four Navy "E" Ribbon Submarine Squadron Battle "E"s.

Chicago has also been awarded several campaign and service awards, including the Navy Expeditionary Medal, National Defense Medal, Armed Forces Expeditionary Medal, two Southwest Asia Service Medals, three Sea Service Ribbons, Kuwait Liberation Medal (Saudi Arabia), and the Kuwait Liberation Medal (Kuwait).

One of the barracks buildings at the US Navy's Recruit Training Command, Great Lakes is named "USS Chicago".

== In popular culture ==
- Chicago plays a prominent role in Tom Clancy's novel Red Storm Rising.
- Chicago is also featured prominently in the 2008 naval thriller, Black Sea Affair, by Don Brown.
- Chicago, alongside its former Sixth Fleet sister, USS Dallas, appear in the seventh mission of the 2009 video game, Call of Duty: Modern Warfare 2, titled "The Only Easy Day... Was Yesterday".
