= USS Bremerton (SSN-698) =

Los Angeles-class nuclear-powered attack submarine of the US Navy

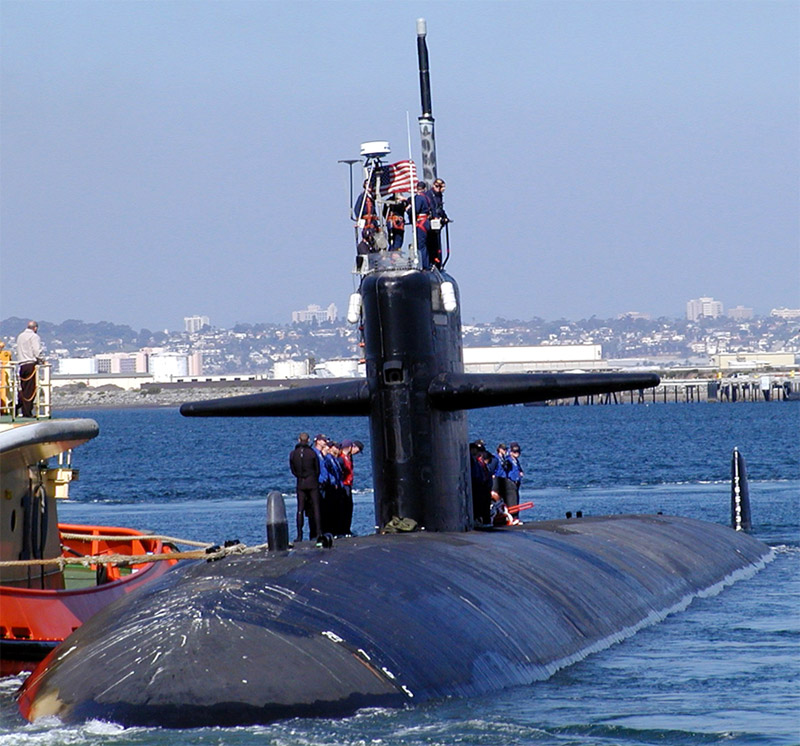
- Bremerton pulling into port

History

United States
- Name: USS Bremerton
- Namesake: Bremerton, Washington
- Awarded: 24 January 1972
- Builder: General Dynamics Corporation
- Laid down: 8 May 1976
- Launched: 22 July 1978
- Sponsored by: Mrs. Helen Jackson
- Commissioned: 28 March 1981
- Decommissioned: 21 May 2021
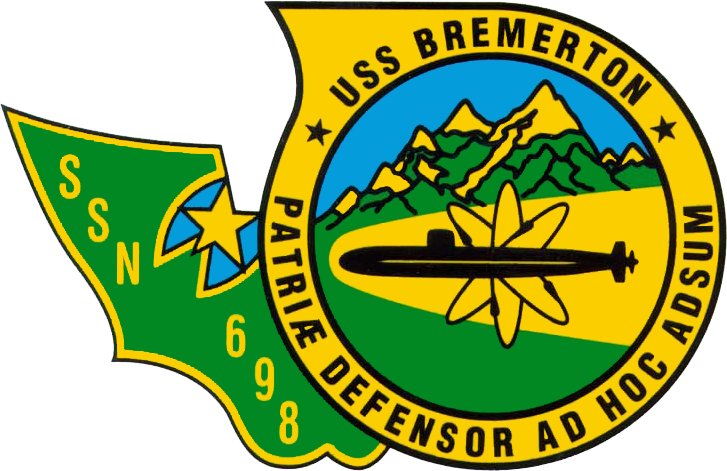
- Badge

General characteristics
- Class & type: Los Angeles-class submarine
- Displacement: 5,789 tons light; 6,159 tons full; 370 tons dead
- Length: 110.3 m (361 ft 11 in)
- Beam: 10 m (32 ft 10 in)
- Draft: 9.7 m (31 ft 10 in)
- Propulsion: S6G nuclear reactor
- Complement: 12 officers, 98 enlisted
- Armament: 4 × 21 in (533 mm) torpedo tubes

USS Bremerton (SSN-698), a Los Angeles-class submarine, is the second vessel of the United States Navy to be named for Bremerton, Washington. The contract to build her was awarded to the Electric Boat Division of General Dynamics Corporation in Groton, Connecticut on 24 January 1972 and her keel was laid down on 8 May 1976. She was launched on 22 July 1978 sponsored by Mrs. Helen Jackson (née Hardin), wife of Henry M. Jackson, and commissioned on 28 March 1981.

== Ship history ==
On 11 March 1999, Bremerton used one torpedo to sink the derelict forebody of the merchant ship New Carissa off the Oregon coast. USS David R. Ray assisted in sinking the ship.

After a successful Western Pacific deployment, in September 2003 Bremerton changed its homeport to Pearl Harbor, Hawaii. Bremerton spent two months in drydock at Pearl Harbor ending 21 January 2010.

When USS Los Angeles was decommissioned on 23 January 2010, Bremerton became the oldest commissioned submarine in the US fleet. On that day, Richard O'Kane's cribbage board was transferred from Los Angeles to Bremerton, a tradition that dates back to World War II. When Bremerton was inactivated in 2018, the cribbage board was transferred from Bremerton to USS Olympia (SSN-717).

In January 2011, Bremerton was adopted by its namesake city, along with a partnership of community members and organizations led by the Bremerton-Olympic Peninsula Council of the US Navy League. In February 2015, Bremerton visited the City of Bremerton.

On 15 June 2016, the 35-year-old submarine completed her 15th deployment. Although originally scheduled for decommissioning in 2017, USS Bremerton's life was extended for an unspecified period. On 20 July 17, 2017, she became the longest-commissioned U.S. Navy submarine, surpassing USS Kamehameha (SSBN-642) at the time. On 6 April 2018, she returned to Pearl Harbor from her final deployment, soon to be decommissioned.

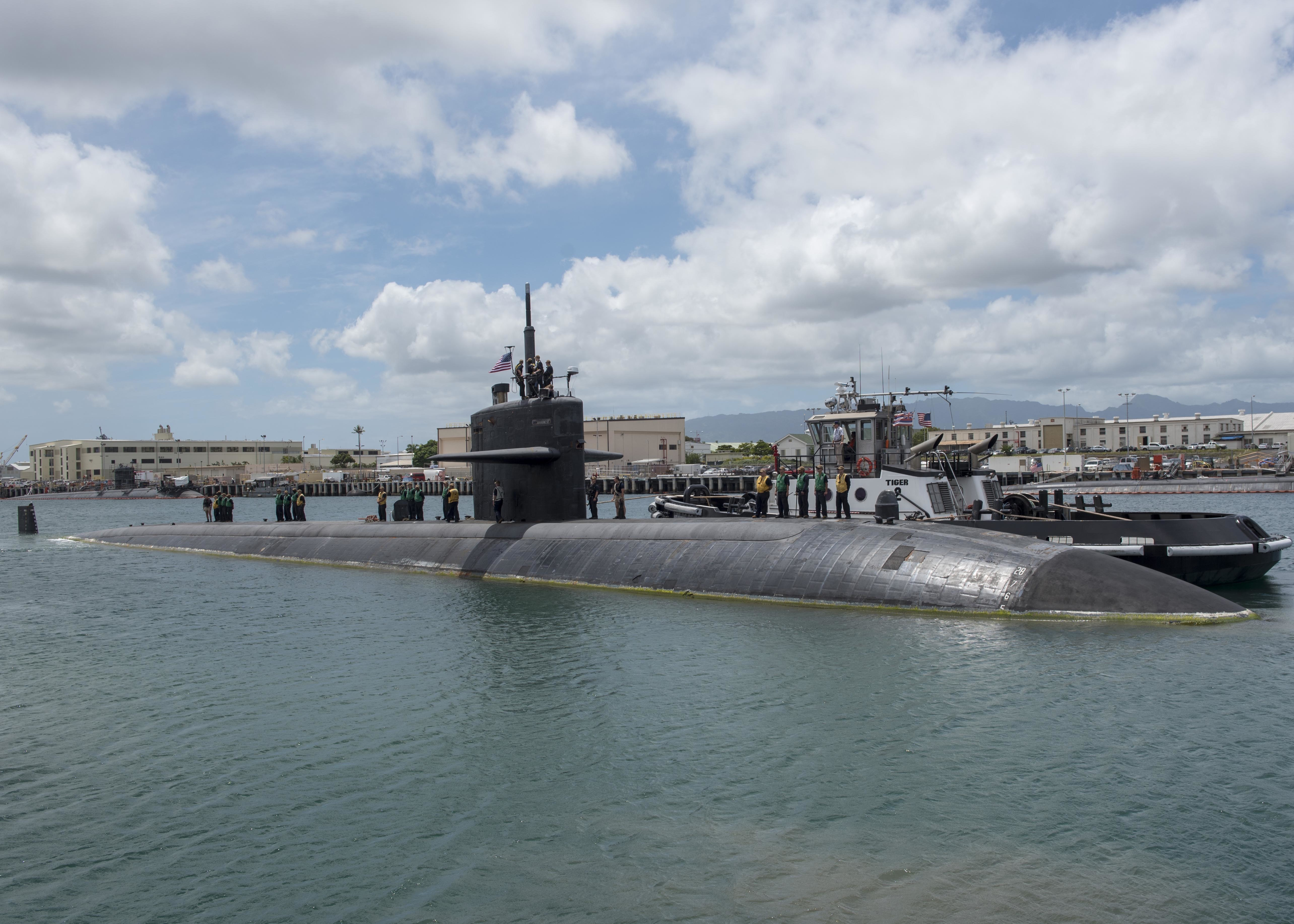
Bremerton leaves Pearl Harbor, 20 April, 2018.

On 20 April 2018, USS Bremerton left Pearl Harbor for the last time en route to Puget Sound Naval Shipyard in Bremerton, Washington, to enter the submarine recycling program.

=== Decommissioning ===
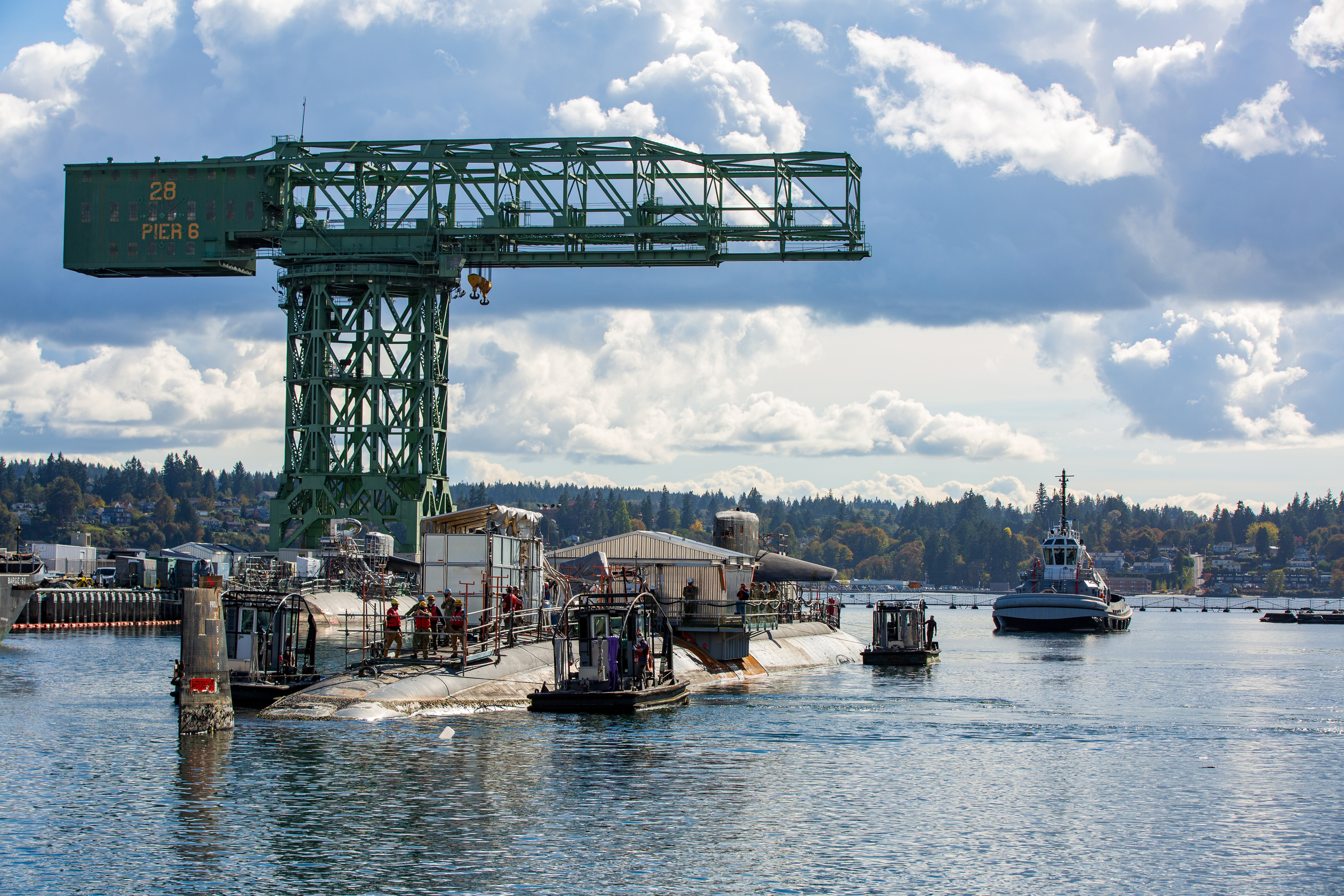
Ex-Bremerton at the Puget Sound Naval Shipyard & Intermediate Maintenance Facility 14 October, 2020.

Bremerton had her decommissioning ceremony 18 May 2021, at the U.S. Naval Undersea Museum in Keyport, Washington, though the actual decommissioning did not occur until later that year. Due to COVID restrictions, crewmembers were not allowed to attend the event in person, but SUBGRU 9 streamed the event live globally via Facebook Live and YouTube. Bremerton was officially decommissioned 21 May 2021.

Plans call for the display of the sail in Bremerton, Washington.
